= 2007–2008 FIG Rhythmic Gymnastics World Cup series =

International rhythm gymnastics competition

The 2007–2008 FIG Rhythmic Gymnastics World Cup series was a series of stages where events in rhythmic gymnastics were contested. The series consisted of a two-year long competition, culminating at a final event — the World Cup Final in 2008. A number of qualifier stages were held. The top 3 gymnasts and groups in each apparatus at the qualifier events would receive medals and prize money. The organizing committees were free to host all-around competitions, but these were not eligible for the assignment of World Cup points. Gymnasts and groups that finished in the top 8 also received points which were added up to a ranking that qualified for the biennial World Cup Final.

== Stages ==
| Year | Event | Location | Type |
|---|---|---|---|
| 2007 | World Cup qualifier | (Ukraine) Kyiv | Individuals |
| 2007 | World Cup qualifier | (Portugal) Portimão | Individuals and groups |
| 2007 | World Cup qualifier | (Russia) Saint Petersburg | Groups |
| 2007 | World Cup qualifier | (France) Corbeil-Essonnes | Individuals |
| 2007 | ~~World Cup qualifier~~ | (Belarus) Minsk | Canceled (Groups) |
| 2007 | World Cup qualifier | (Russia) Nizhny Novgorod | Groups |
| 2007 | World Cup qualifier | (Italy) Genova | Groups |
| 2007 | World Cup qualifier | (Israel) Tel Aviv | Groups |
| 2007 | World Cup qualifier | (Slovenia) Ljubljana | Individuals |
| 2008 | World Cup qualifier | (Ukraine) Kyiv | Individuals and groups |
| 2008 | World Cup qualifier | (Slovenia) Maribor | Individuals |
| 2008 | World Cup qualifier | (Portugal) Portimão | Individuals and groups |
| 2008 | World Cup qualifier | (Russia) Nizhny Novgorod | Groups |
| 2008 | World Cup qualifier | (France) Corbeil-Essonnes | Individuals |
| 2008 | World Cup qualifier | (Belarus) Minsk | Individuals and groups |
| 2008 | ~~World Cup qualifier~~ | (Israel) Tel Aviv | Canceled (Groups) |
| 2008 | World Cup qualifier | (Kazakhstan) Astana | Individuals |
| 2008 | World Cup qualifier | (Bulgaria) Varna | Groups |
| 2008 | World Cup qualifier | (Russia) Irkutsk | Individuals |
| 2008 | World Cup Final | (Spain) Benidorm | Individuals and groups |

== Medalists ==
=== Individual ===
==== All-around ====
| Competitions | Gold | Silver | Bronze |
|---|---|---|---|
| Kyiv 2007 | (Ukraine) Anna Bessonova | (Russia) Olga Kapranova | (Russia) Yevgeniya Kanayeva |
| Portimão 2007 | (Russia) Alina Kabaeva | (Ukraine) Anna Bessonova | (Russia) Vera Sessina |
| Corbeil 2007 | (Russia) Yevgeniya Kanayeva | (Ukraine) Anna Bessonova | (Belarus) Inna Zhukova |
| Ljubljana 2007 | (Russia) Olga Kapranova | (Russia) Vera Sessina | (Russia) Yevgeniya Kanayeva |
| Kyiv 2008 | (Russia) Olga Kapranova | (Ukraine) Anna Bessonova | (Russia) Yevgeniya Kanayeva |
| Maribor 2008 | (Russia) Yevgeniya Kanayeva | (Russia) Olga Kapranova | (Ukraine) Anna Bessonova |
| Portimão 2008 | (Russia) Yevgeniya Kanayeva | (Ukraine) Anna Bessonova | (Russia) Olga Kapranova |
| Corbeil 2008 | (Russia) Yevgeniya Kanayeva | (Ukraine) Anna Bessonova | (Ukraine) Natalia Godunko |
| Minsk 2008 | (Russia) Olga Kapranova | (Ukraine) Anna Bessonova | (Belarus) Inna Zhukova |
| Astana 2008 | (Russia) Yevgeniya Kanayeva | (Kazakhstan) Aliya Yussupova | (Russia) Olga Kapranova |
| Irkutsk 2008 | (Russia) Yevgeniya Kanayeva | (Russia) Olga Kapranova | (Russia) Vera Sessina |
| Benidorm 2008 | No all-around competition | | |

==== Rope ====
| Competitions | Gold | Silver | Bronze |
|---|---|---|---|
| Kyiv 2007 | (Ukraine) Anna Bessonova | (Ukraine) Natalia Godunko | (Russia) Olga Kapranova |
| Portimão 2007 | (Russia) Alina Kabaeva | (Ukraine) Anna Bessonova | (Russia) Vera Sessina |
| Corbeil 2007 | (Russia) Yevgeniya Kanayeva | (Ukraine) Natalia Godunko | (Bulgaria) Simona Peycheva |
| Ljubljana 2007 | (Russia) Vera Sessina | (Ukraine) Anna Bessonova | (Russia) Yevgeniya Kanayeva |
| Kyiv 2008 | (Ukraine) Anna Bessonova | (Russia) Olga Kapranova | (Russia) Yevgeniya Kanayeva |
| Maribor 2008 | (Russia) Yevgeniya Kanayeva | (Russia) Olga Kapranova | (Ukraine) Natalia Godunko |
| Portimão 2008 | (Russia) Yevgeniya Kanayeva | (Russia) Olga Kapranova | (Ukraine) Anna Bessonova |
| Corbeil 2008 | (Russia) Yevgeniya Kanayeva | (Ukraine) Anna Bessonova | (Ukraine) Natalia Godunko |
| Minsk 2008 | (Belarus) Inna Zhukova | (Russia) Vera Sessina | (Russia) Olga Kapranova |
| Astana 2008 | (Russia) Vera Sessina | (Russia) Yevgeniya Kanayeva | (Kazakhstan) Aliya Yussupova |
| Irkutsk 2008 | (Russia) Yevgeniya Kanayeva | (Russia) Olga Kapranova | (Belarus) Inna Zhukova |
| Benidorm 2008 | (Russia) Vera Sessina | (Russia) Olga Kapranova | (Azerbaijan) Aliya Garayeva |

==== Hoop ====
| Competitions | Gold | Silver | Bronze |
|---|---|---|---|
| Kyiv 2007 | (Ukraine) Anna Bessonova | (Russia) Olga Kapranova | (Ukraine) Natalia Godunko |
| Portimão 2007 | (Russia) Olga Kapranova | (Russia) Alina Kabaeva | (Belarus) Inna Zhukova |
| Corbeil 2007 | (Russia) Yevgeniya Kanayeva | (Ukraine) Natalia Godunko | (Azerbaijan) Aliya Garayeva |
| Ljubljana 2007 | (Ukraine) Anna Bessonova | (Russia) Vera Sessina | (Russia) Olga Kapranova |
| Kyiv 2008 | (Ukraine) Anna Bessonova | (Russia) Olga Kapranova | (Russia) Yevgeniya Kanayeva |
| Maribor 2008 | (Russia) Olga Kapranova | (Russia) Yevgeniya Kanayeva | (Belarus) Inna Zhukova |
| Portimão 2008 | (Russia) Yevgeniya Kanayeva | (Russia) Olga Kapranova | (Kazakhstan) Aliya Yussupova |
| Corbeil 2008 | (Russia) Yevgeniya Kanayeva | (Ukraine) Natalia Godunko | (Spain) Almudena Cid |
| Minsk 2008 | (Russia) Olga Kapranova | (Belarus) Inna Zhukova | (Russia) Vera Sessina |
| Astana 2008 | (Russia) Yevgeniya Kanayeva | (Russia) Olga Kapranova | (Kazakhstan) Aliya Yussupova |
| Irkutsk 2008 | (Russia) Yevgeniya Kanayeva | (Kazakhstan) Aliya Yussupova | (Russia) Vera Sessina |
| Benidorm 2008 | (Russia) Yevgeniya Kanayeva | (Ukraine) Anna Bessonova | (Ukraine) Natalia Godunko |

==== Clubs ====
| Competitions | Gold | Silver | Bronze |
|---|---|---|---|
| Kyiv 2007 | (Russia) Olga Kapranova | (Russia) Marina Shpekht | (Ukraine) Anna Bessonova |
| Portimão 2007 | (Russia) Alina Kabaeva | (Ukraine) Anna Bessonova | (Russia) Vera Sessina |
| Corbeil 2007 | (Ukraine) Anna Bessonova | (Ukraine) Natalia Godunko | (Bulgaria) Simona Peycheva |
| Ljubljana 2007 | (Ukraine) Anna Bessonova | (Russia) Yevgeniya Kanayeva | (Russia) Olga Kapranova |
| Kyiv 2008 | (Ukraine) Anna Bessonova | (Russia) Yevgeniya Kanayeva | (Belarus) Inna Zhukova |
| Maribor 2008 | (Russia) Yevgeniya Kanayeva | (Ukraine) Anna Bessonova | (Azerbaijan) Aliya Garayeva |
| Portimão 2008 | (Russia) Yevgeniya Kanayeva | (Russia) Olga Kapranova | (Ukraine) Anna Bessonova |
| Corbeil 2008 | (Russia) Yevgeniya Kanayeva | (Ukraine) Anna Bessonova | (Ukraine) Natalia Godunko |
| Minsk 2008 | (Ukraine) Anna Bessonova | (Russia) Vera Sessina | (Ukraine) Natalia Godunko |
| Astana 2008 | (Russia) Yevgeniya Kanayeva | (Russia) Olga Kapranova | (Kazakhstan) Aliya Yussupova |
| Irkutsk 2008 | (Russia) Yevgeniya Kanayeva | (Russia) Olga Kapranova | (Belarus) Inna Zhukova |
| Benidorm 2008 | (Russia) Yevgeniya Kanayeva | (Ukraine) Anna Bessonova | (Russia) Olga Kapranova |

==== Ribbon ====
| Competitions | Gold | Silver | Bronze |
|---|---|---|---|
| Kyiv 2007 | (Ukraine) Anna Bessonova | (Russia) Yevgeniya Kanayeva | (Ukraine) Natalia Godunko |
| Portimão 2007 | (Ukraine) Anna Bessonova | (Russia) Vera Sessina | (Russia) Alina Kabaeva |
| Corbeil 2007 | (Russia) Yevgeniya Kanayeva | (Ukraine) Anna Bessonova | (Belarus) Inna Zhukova |
| Ljubljana 2007 | (Russia) Vera Sessina | (Russia) Olga Kapranova | (Bulgaria) Simona Peycheva |
| Kyiv 2008 | (Ukraine) Anna Bessonova | (Russia) Vera Sessina | (Russia) Olga Kapranova |
| Maribor 2008 | (Russia) Yevgeniya Kanayeva | (Russia) Olga Kapranova | (Ukraine) Anna Bessonova |
| Portimão 2008 | (Russia) Yevgeniya Kanayeva | (Ukraine) Anna Bessonova | (Russia) Olga Kapranova |
| Corbeil 2008 | (Ukraine) Anna Bessonova | (Russia) Yevgeniya Kanayeva | (Ukraine) Natalia Godunko |
| Minsk 2008 | (Russia) Olga Kapranova | (Ukraine) Anna Bessonova | (Russia) Vera Sessina |
| Astana 2008 | (Russia) Vera Sessina | (Russia) Yevgeniya Kanayeva | (Kazakhstan) Aliya Yussupova |
| Irkutsk 2008 | (Russia) Yevgeniya Kanayeva | (Belarus) Inna Zhukova | (Azerbaijan) Dinara Gimatova |
| Benidorm 2008 | (Russia) Yevgeniya Kanayeva | (Ukraine) Anna Bessonova | (Russia) Vera Sessina |

=== Group ===
==== All-around ====
| Competitions | Gold | Silver | Bronze |
|---|---|---|---|
| Portimão 2007 | Russia | Bulgaria | Belarus |
| St. Petersburg 2007 | Italy | Russia | Bulgaria |
| Nizhny 2007 | Russia | Spain | Israel |
| Genova 2007 | Italy | Russia | Belarus |
| Tel Aviv 2007 | No all-around competition | | |
| Kyiv 2008 | Italy | Russia | Ukraine |
| Portimão 2008 | Russia | Bulgaria | Italy |
| Nizhny 2008 | Russia | Belarus | China |
| Minsk 2008 | Russia | Belarus | Italy |
| Varna 2008 | Bulgaria | Israel | Japan |
| Benidorm 2008 | No all-around competition | | |

==== 5 ropes ====
| Competitions | Gold | Silver | Bronze |
|---|---|---|---|
| Portimão 2007 | Russia | Bulgaria | Belarus |
| St. Petersburg 2007 | Bulgaria | Italy | Russia |
| Nizhny 2007 | Russia | Israel | Ukraine |
| Genova 2007 | Bulgaria | Italy | Russia |
| Tel Aviv 2007 | Russia | Belarus | Israel |
| Kyiv 2008 | Russia | Ukraine | Bulgaria |
| Portimão 2008 | Russia | Bulgaria | Belarus |
| Nizhny 2008 | Russia | Belarus | China |
| Minsk 2008 | Belarus | Italy | Israel |
| Varna 2008 | Bulgaria | Israel | Japan |
| Benidorm 2008 | Belarus | Spain | Ukraine |

==== 3 hoops and 4 clubs ====
| Competitions | Gold | Silver | Bronze |
|---|---|---|---|
| Portimão 2007 | Russia | Bulgaria | Belarus |
| St. Petersburg 2007 | Russia | Italy | Bulgaria |
| Nizhny 2007 | Israel | Spain | Russia |
| Genova 2007 | Russia | Italy | Bulgaria |
| Tel Aviv 2007 | Russia | Italy | Belarus |
| Kyiv 2008 | Russia | Italy | Ukraine |
| Portimão 2008 | Russia | China | Bulgaria |
| Nizhny 2008 | Russia | China | Belarus |
| Minsk 2008 | Belarus | Russia | Italy |
| Varna 2008 | Bulgaria | Israel | Japan |
| Benidorm 2008 | Belarus | Spain | Ukraine |

== See also ==
- 2007 Rhythmic Gymnastics Grand Prix circuit
- 2008 Rhythmic Gymnastics Grand Prix circuit
