= 2005–2006 FIG Rhythmic Gymnastics World Cup series =

International rhythm gymnastics competition

The 2005–2006 FIG Rhythmic Gymnastics World Cup series was a series of stages where events in rhythmic gymnastics were contested. The series consisted of a two-year long competition, culminating at a final event — the World Cup Final in 2008. A number of qualifier stages were held. The top 3 gymnasts and groups in each apparatus at the qualifier events would receive medals and prize money. The organizing committees were free to host all-around competitions, but these events were not eligible for the assignment of World Cup points. Gymnasts and groups that finished in the top 8 also received points which were added up to a ranking that qualified for the biennial World Cup Final.

== Stages ==
Year	Event	Location	Type	Ref.
2005	World Cup qualifier	(Russia) Nizhny Novgorod	Groups	
2005	World Cup qualifier	(France) Corbeil-Essonnes	Individuals	
2005	World Cup qualifier	(Azerbaijan) Baku	Individuals and groups	
2005	World Cup qualifier	(Bulgaria) Varna	Individuals	
2005	World Cup qualifier	(Germany) Düsseldorf	Groups	
2005	World Cup qualifier	(Uzbekistan) Tashkent	Individuals	
2006	World Cup qualifier	(Russia) Nizhny Novgorod	Groups	
2006	World Cup qualifier	(France) Corbeil-Essonnes	Individuals	
2006	World Cup qualifier	(Russia) Irkutsk	Individuals	
2006	World Cup qualifier	(Italy) Genova	Groups	
2006	World Cup qualifier	(Portugal) Portimão	Individuals and groups	
2006	~~World Cup qualifier~~	(Germany) Düsseldorf	Canceled (Groups)	
2006	World Cup Final	(Japan) Mie	Individuals and groups	

== Medalists ==
=== Individual ===
==== All-around ====
Competitions	Gold	Silver	Bronze
Corbeil 2005	(Russia) Irina Tchachina	(Ukraine) Anna Bessonova	(Ukraine) Natalia Godunko
Baku 2005	(Russia) Olga Kapranova	(Russia) Irina Tchachina	(Belarus) Inna Zhukova
Varna 2005	(Bulgaria) Stela Sultanova	(Russia) Marina Shpekht	(Bulgaria) Maya Paunovska
Tashkent 2005	(Russia) Vera Sessina	(Russia) Olga Kapranova	(Belarus) Valeria Kurylskaya
Corbeil 2006	(Ukraine) Natalia Godunko	(Russia) Marina Shpekht	(Ukraine) Anna Bessonova
Irkutsk 2006	(Russia) Vera Sessina	(Russia) Olga Kapranova	(Russia) Marina Shpekht
Portimão 2006	(Ukraine) Natalia Godunko	(Belarus) Inna Zhukova	(Ukraine) Anna Bessonova
Mie 2006	No all-around competition		

==== Rope ====
Competitions	Gold	Silver	Bronze
Corbeil 2005	(Russia) Irina Tchachina	(Ukraine) Anna Bessonova	(Ukraine) Natalia Godunko
Baku 2005	(Russia) Olga Kapranova	(Belarus) Inna Zhukova	(Russia) Vera Sessina
Varna 2005	(Russia) Marina Shpekht	(Bulgaria) Stela Sultanova	(Bulgaria) Maya Paunovska
Tashkent 2005	(Russia) Vera Sessina	(Russia) Olga Kapranova	(Azerbaijan) Anna Gurbanova
Corbeil 2006	(Ukraine) Anna Bessonova	(Ukraine) Natalia Godunko	(Russia) Marina Shpekht
Irkutsk 2006	(Russia) Vera Sessina	(Russia) Olga Kapranova	(Belarus) Inna Zhukova
Portimão 2006	(Ukraine) Natalia Godunko	(Ukraine) Anna Bessonova	(Belarus) Inna Zhukova
Mie 2006	(Ukraine) Natalia Godunko	(Russia) Vera Sessina	(Ukraine) Anna Bessonova

==== Ball ====
Competitions	Gold	Silver	Bronze
Corbeil 2005	(Ukraine) Anna Bessonova	(Bulgaria) Simona Peycheva	(Ukraine) Natalia Godunko
Baku 2005	(Russia) Olga Kapranova	(Russia) Irina Tchachina	(Kazakhstan) Aliya Yussupova
Varna 2005	(Bulgaria) Stela Sultanova	(Bulgaria) Maya Paunovska	(Russia) Marina Shpekht
Tashkent 2005	(Russia) Olga Kapranova	(Russia) Vera Sessina	(Kazakhstan) Aliya Yussupova
Corbeil 2006	(Russia) Yevgeniya Kanayeva	(Ukraine) Anna Bessonova	(Ukraine) Natalia Godunko
Irkutsk 2006	(Russia) Olga Kapranova	(Belarus) Inna Zhukova	(Russia) Vera Sessina
Portimão 2006	(Belarus) Inna Zhukova	(Kazakhstan) Aliya Yussupova	(Ukraine) Natalia Godunko
Mie 2006	(Russia) Vera Sessina	(Belarus) Inna Zhukova	(Ukraine) Anna Bessonova

==== Clubs ====
Competitions	Gold	Silver	Bronze
Corbeil 2005	(Russia) Irina Tchachina	(Ukraine) Anna Bessonova	(Ukraine) Natalia Godunko
Baku 2005	(Russia) Vera Sessina	(Azerbaijan) Dinara Gimatova	(Belarus) Inna Zhukova
Varna 2005	(Bulgaria) Stela Sultanova	(Russia) Marina Shpekht	(Bulgaria) Silvia Miteva
Tashkent 2005	(Russia) Olga Kapranova	(Russia) Vera Sessina	(Uzbekistan) Zarina Mukhitdinova
Corbeil 2006	(Ukraine) Anna Bessonova	(Russia) Marina Shpekht	(Ukraine) Natalia Godunko
Irkutsk 2006	(Russia) Olga Kapranova	(Russia) Vera Sessina	(Belarus) Inna Zhukova
Portimão 2006	(Russia) Yevgeniya Kanayeva	(Ukraine) Anna Bessonova	(Belarus) Inna Zhukova
Mie 2006	(Russia) Vera Sessina	(Russia) Olga Kapranova	(Ukraine) Natalia Godunko

==== Ribbon ====
Competitions	Gold	Silver	Bronze
Corbeil 2005	(Russia) Irina Tchachina	(Ukraine) Natalia Godunko	(Russia) Olga Kapranova
Baku 2005	(Russia) Irina Tchachina	(Azerbaijan) Dinara Gimatova	(Russia) Olga Kapranova
Varna 2005	(Bulgaria) Silvia Miteva	(Bulgaria) Maya Paunovska	(Russia) Marina Shpekht
Tashkent 2005	(Russia) Vera Sessina	(Russia) Olga Kapranova	(Belarus) Liubov Charkashyna
Corbeil 2006	(Ukraine) Anna Bessonova	(Russia) Yevgeniya Kanayeva	(Ukraine) Natalia Godunko
Irkutsk 2006	(Russia) Vera Sessina	(Russia) Olga Kapranova	(Belarus) Inna Zhukova
Portimão 2006	(Ukraine) Natalia Godunko	(Russia) Yevgeniya Kanayeva	(Russia) Marina Shpekht
Mie 2006	(Russia) Vera Sessina	(Ukraine) Natalia Godunko	(Ukraine) Anna Bessonova

=== Group ===
==== All-around ====
Competitions	Gold	Silver	Bronze
Nizhny 2005	Russia	Bulgaria	Italy
Baku 2005	Russia	Italy	Bulgaria
Düsseldorf 2005	No all-around competition		
Nizhny 2006	Russia	Belarus	China
Genova 2006	No all-around competition		
Portimão 2006	Belarus	China	Bulgaria
Mie 2006	No all-around competition		

==== 5 ribbons ====
Competitions	Gold	Silver	Bronze
Nizhny 2005	Bulgaria	Russia	Italy
Baku 2005	Russia	Bulgaria	Italy
Düsseldorf 2005	Italy	Bulgaria	Belarus
Nizhny 2006	Belarus	Russia	Azerbaijan
Genova 2006	Russia	Italy	Belarus
Portimão 2006	Belarus	Bulgaria	Spain
Mie 2006	Russia	Belarus	Italy

==== 3 hoops and 4 clubs ====
Competitions	Gold	Silver	Bronze
Nizhny 2005	Russia	Bulgaria	Italy
Baku 2005	Russia	Italy	Spain
Düsseldorf 2005	Italy	Belarus	Bulgaria
Nizhny 2006	Russia	Belarus	Bulgaria
Genova 2006	Russia	Belarus	Bulgaria
Portimão 2006	Bulgaria	Spain	China
Mie 2006	Belarus	Russia	Bulgaria

== See also ==
- 2005–2006 FIG Artistic Gymnastics World Cup series
- 2005 Rhythmic Gymnastics Grand Prix circuit
- 2006 Rhythmic Gymnastics Grand Prix circuit
