= Maya Paunovska =

Bulgarian gymnast (born 1988)

- Born: 5 May 1988 (age 38)

Gymnastics career
- Discipline: Rhythmic gymnastics
- Country represented: Bulgaria (2004–08 (?))
Medal record
Representing Bulgaria
Rhythmic gymnastics
World Championships
Bronze medal – third place	2007 Patras	5 Ropes
Bronze medal – third place	2007 Patras	3 Hoops + 4 Clubs
World Cups
Silver medal – second place	2006 Portimao	5 Ribbons
Gold medal – first place	2006 Portimao	3 Hoops + 4 Clubs
Bronze medal – third place	2006 Genova	3 Hoops + 4 Clubs
Bronze medal – third place	2006 Mie (Final)	3 Hoops + 4 Clubs
Silver medal – second place	2007 Portimao	All-around
Silver medal – second place	2007 Portimao	Rope
Bronze medal – third place	2007 St. Petersburg	All-around
Gold medal – first place	2007 St. Petersburg	5 Ropes
Bronze medal – third place	2007 St. Petersburg	3 Hoops + 4 Clubs
Gold medal – first place	2007 Genova	5 Ropes
Bronze medal – third place	2007 Genova	3 Hoops + 4 Clubs
Bronze medal – third place	2008 Kyiv	5 Ropes
Silver medal – second place	2008 Portimao	All-around
Silver medal – second place	2007 Portimao	5 Ropes
Bronze medal – third place	2008 Portimao	3 Hoops + 4 Clubs
Gold medal – first place	2008 Varna	All-around
Gold medal – first place	2007 Varna	5 Ropes
Gold medal – first place	2008 Varna	3 Hoops + 4 Clubs
European Championships
Bronze medal – third place	2008 Torino	5 Ropes
Bronze medal – third place	2006 Moscow	3 Hoops + 2 Clubs

Maya Paunovska (Bulgarian: Мая Пауновска; born 5 May 1988) is a retired Bulgarian group rhythmic gymnast.

She competed as an individual at the 2004 European Championships, where she placed 23rd.

Paunovska won one gold, one silver and two bronze medals at the 2005-2006 FIG Rhythmic Gymnastics World Cup series.

As part of the Bulgarian group, she won a bronze medal in the 3 Hoops + 2 Clubs final at the 2006 European Championships. In 2007, she won a bronze medal in both finals with the rest of the Bulgarian group at the 2007 World Rhythmic Gymnastics Championships. In 2008, she tore her calf muscle and needed time to recover. She competed at the 2008 Summer Olympics in Beijing, where the group ranked 5th.
