= 2008 FIG Rhythmic Gymnastics World Cup Final =

International rhythmic gymnastics competition

The 2008 FIG Rhythmic Gymnastics World Cup Final was the eighth edition of the Rhythmic Gymnastics World Cup Final, held from October 4 to October 6, 2008, in Benidorm, Spain. The competition was officially organized by the International Gymnastics Federation as the last stage of a series of competitions through the 2007–2008 season.

== Medalists ==
Event	Gold	Silver	Bronze	Ref.
Rope	(Russia) Vera Sessina	(Russia) Olga Kapranova	(Azerbaijan) Aliya Garayeva	
Hoop	(Russia) Evgenia Kanaeva	(Ukraine) Anna Bessonova	(Ukraine) Natalia Godunko	
Clubs	(Russia) Evgenia Kanaeva	(Ukraine) Anna Bessonova	(Russia) Olga Kapranova	
Ribbon	(Russia) Evgenia Kanaeva	(Ukraine) Anna Bessonova	(Russia) Vera Sessina	
Group 5 Ropes	Belarus	Spain	Ukraine	
Group 4 Clubs, 3 Hoops	Belarus	Spain	Ukraine	

== Medal table ==
Rank	Nation	Gold	Silver	Bronze	Total
1	Russia (RUS)	4	1	2	7
2	Belarus (BLR)	2	0	0	2
3	Ukraine (UKR)	0	3	3	6
4	Spain (ESP)	0	2	0	2
5	Azerbaijan (AZE)	0	0	1	1
Totals (5 entries)		6	6	6	18

== See also ==
- 2008 Rhythmic Gymnastics Grand Prix circuit
