= 2006 FIG Rhythmic Gymnastics World Cup Final =

International rhythmic gymnastics competition

The 2006 FIG Rhythmic Gymnastics World Cup Final was the seventh edition of the Rhythmic Gymnastics World Cup Final, held from November 17 to November 18, 2006 in Mie, Japan. The competition was officially organized by the International Gymnastics Federation as the last stage of a series of competitions through the 2005–2006 season.

== Medalists ==
Event	Gold	Silver	Bronze	Ref.
Rope	(Ukraine) Natalia Godunko	(Russia) Vera Sessina	(Ukraine) Anna Bessonova	
Ball	(Russia) Vera Sessina	(Belarus) Inna Zhukova	(Ukraine) Anna Bessonova	
Clubs	(Russia) Vera Sessina	(Russia) Olga Kapranova	(Ukraine) Natalia Godunko	
Ribbon	(Russia) Vera Sessina	(Ukraine) Natalia Godunko	(Ukraine) Anna Bessonova	
Group 5 Ribbons	Russia	Belarus	Italy	
Group 4 Clubs, 3 Hoops	Belarus	Russia	Bulgaria	

== Medal table ==
Rank	Nation	Gold	Silver	Bronze	Total
1	Russia (RUS)	4	3	0	7
2	Belarus (BLR)	1	2	0	3
3	Ukraine (UKR)	1	1	4	6
4	Bulgaria (BUL)	0	0	1	1
4	Italy (ITA)	0	0	1	1
Totals (5 entries)		6	6	6	18

== See also ==
- 2006 Rhythmic Gymnastics Grand Prix circuit
