= Aurora (2006 film) =

- Film poster
- Directed by: Oksana Bairak
- Written by: Cameron Boyce
- Starring: Anastasia Zyurkalova; Dmitry Kharatyan; Eric Roberts; Anastasia Meskova; Viktor Stepanov
- Cinematography: Vitaliy Konevtsov
- Music by: Valeriy Tyshler
- Distributed by: IntVestDistribution; Studio Bairak
- Release date: 2006
- Running time: 115 minutes
- Languages: English, Russian, Ukrainian

Aurora (Russian: and Ukrainian: «Аврора», romanized: Avrora) is a Ukrainian film by Oksana Bairak. It was premiered on November 30, 2006.

== Plot ==
The film is about a little girl named Aurora who suffered as a result of the Chernobyl disaster of 1986. Aurora is taken to the United States where she is supposed to get surgery. She meets a man with a ruined life and helps him become a refined character.

== Cast ==
- Nastya Zyurkalova as Aurora
- Dmitry Kharatyan as Nik Astakhov
- Eric Roberts as Mr. Brown
- Anastasiya Meskova as Margo
- Anastasiya Bunina as Natalya
- Varvara Filipchuk
- Vlad Gerasimov
- Vladimir Goryanskiy
- Yekaterina Kachan
- Sergey Malyuga
- Oleg Maslennikov
- Irina Pogulyay
- Natalya Natalushko
- Stanislava Khomenko
- Dima Martimyanov
- Alla Maslennikova
- Yelena Petrashko
- Larisa Pretorius

== Awards ==
The film was nominated as Ukraine's entry for an Oscar as Best Foreign Language Film.

In 2007 and 2008, the main music theme of the movie, also called Aurora, was used by the Ukrainian rhythmic gymnast Anna Bessonova for her hoop routine, which was applauded well.

== See also ==
- List of submissions to the 79th Academy Awards for Best Foreign Language Film
- List of Ukrainian submissions for the Academy Award for Best Foreign Language Film
