= Alina Kabaeva =

Russian athlete and politician (born 1983)

Alina Kabaeva Алина Кабаева
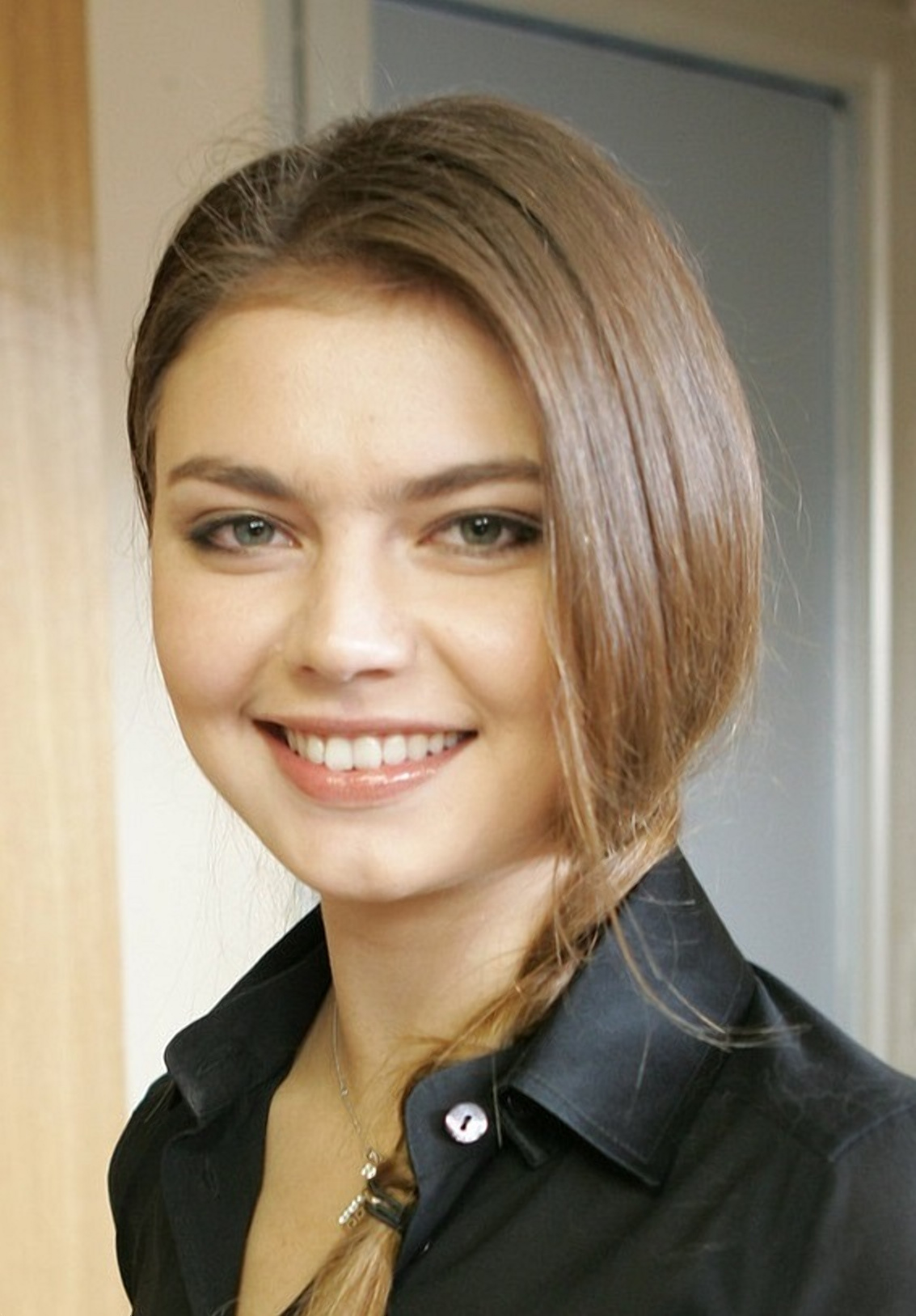
- Kabaeva in 2021

Personal information
- Full name: Alina Maratovna Kabaeva
- Born: 12 May 1983 (age 43) Tashkent, Soviet Union
- Height: 166 cm (5 ft 5 in)

Gymnastics career
- Discipline: Rhythmic gymnastics
- Country represented: Russia; (1996–2007)
- Club: MGFSO Dynamo
- Head coach: Irina Viner
- Assistant coach: Vera Shatalina
- Choreographer: Veronica Shatkova
- Eponymous skills: Backscale pivots
- Retired: 2007
Medal record
Rhythmic gymnastics
Representing Russia
Event	1st	2nd	3rd
Olympic Games	1	0	1
World Championships	9	3	2
European Championships	15	3	3
European Team Championships	3	0	0
World Cup Final	5	1	0
Grand Prix Final	4	1	1
Goodwill Games	4	1	0
Total	41	9	7
Olympic Games
Gold medal – first place	2004 Athens	All-around
Bronze medal – third place	2000 Sydney	All-around
World Championships
Gold medal – first place	1999 Osaka	All-around
Gold medal – first place	1999 Osaka	Team
Gold medal – first place	1999 Osaka	Ball
Gold medal – first place	1999 Osaka	Ribbon
Gold medal – first place	2003 Budapest	All-around
Gold medal – first place	2003 Budapest	Team
Gold medal – first place	2003 Budapest	Ball
Gold medal – first place	2003 Budapest	Ribbon
Gold medal – first place	2007 Patras	Team
Silver medal – second place	1999 Osaka	Rope
Silver medal – second place	1999 Osaka	Hoop
Silver medal – second place	2003 Budapest	Hoop
Bronze medal – third place	2003 Budapest	Clubs
Bronze medal – third place	2007 Patras	Ribbon
Disqualified	2001 Madrid	All-around
Disqualified	2001 Madrid	Rope
Disqualified	2001 Madrid	Ball
Disqualified	2001 Madrid	Hoop
Disqualified	2001 Madrid	Clubs
Disqualified	2001 Madrid	Team
European Championships
Gold medal – first place	1998 Porto	All-around
Gold medal – first place	1999 Budapest	All-around
Gold medal – first place	1999 Budapest	Hoop
Gold medal – first place	2000 Zaragoza	All-around
Gold medal – first place	2000 Zaragoza	Team
Gold medal – first place	2000 Zaragoza	Hoop
Gold medal – first place	2000 Zaragoza	Ball
Gold medal – first place	2000 Zaragoza	Ribbon
Gold medal – first place	2001 Geneva	Hoop
Gold medal – first place	2001 Geneva	Ball
Gold medal – first place	2001 Geneva	Clubs
Gold medal – first place	2002 Granada	All-around
Gold medal – first place	2002 Granada	Team
Gold medal – first place	2004 Kyiv	All-around
Gold medal – first place	2004 Kyiv	Team
Silver medal – second place	1999 Budapest	Ribbon
Silver medal – second place	2001 Geneva	Rope
Silver medal – second place	2006 Moscow	All-around
Bronze medal – third place	1998 Porto	Team
Bronze medal – third place	1999 Budapest	Rope
Bronze medal – third place	2000 Zaragoza	Rope
European Team Championships
Gold medal – first place	1999 Patras	Team
Gold medal – first place	2001 Riesa	Team
Gold medal – first place	2003 Moscow	Team
World Cup Final
Gold medal – first place	2000 Glasgow	Rope
Gold medal – first place	2000 Glasgow	Ball
Gold medal – first place	2000 Glasgow	Ribbon
Gold medal – first place	2004 Moscow	Hoop
Gold medal – first place	2004 Moscow	Ribbon
Silver medal – second place	2000 Glasgow	Hoop
Grand Prix Final
Gold medal – first place	1998 Linz	All-around
Gold medal – first place	1999 Korneuburg	Hoop
Gold medal – first place	1999 Korneuburg	Ball
Gold medal – first place	1999 Korneuburg	Ribbon
Gold medal – first place	2001 Deventer	All-around
Gold medal – first place	2001 Deventer	Hoop
Gold medal – first place	2001 Deventer	Ball
Silver medal – second place	1999 Korneuburg	All-around
Silver medal – second place	2001 Deventer	Rope
Bronze medal – third place	2000 Deventer	Ribbon
Goodwill Games
Gold medal – first place	1998 New York	All-around
Gold medal – first place	1998 New York	Clubs
Gold medal – first place	1998 New York	Ribbon
Gold medal – first place	1998 New York	Hoop
Silver medal – second place	1998 New York	Rope
Disqualified	2001 Brisbane	All-around
Disqualified	2001 Brisbane	Ball
Disqualified	2001 Brisbane	Clubs
Disqualified	2001 Brisbane	Rope
Disqualified	2001 Brisbane	Hoop

Member of the State Duma for Nizhnekamsk
- In office 12 February 2007 – 15 September 2014

Personal details
- Party: United Russia

Alina Maratovna Kabaeva (Note: In this name that follows East Slavic naming customs, the patronymic is Maratovna and the family name is Kabaeva.) (Note: Russian: Алина Маратовна Кабаева, pronounced [ɐˈlʲinə mɐˈratəvnə kɐˈbajɪvə]; Tatar: Әлинә Марат кызы Кабаева) (or Kabayeva; born 12 May 1983) is a Russian politician, media manager, and retired individual rhythmic gymnast, who has been designated Honoured Master of Sports by the Russian government.

Kabaeva is one of the most decorated gymnasts in rhythmic gymnastic history, with 2 Olympic medals, 14 World Championship medals, and 21 European Championship medals. She is reportedly the longtime partner of Russian president Vladimir Putin.

From 2007 to 2014, Kabaeva was a State Duma deputy from the United Russia Party. In September of 2014, Kabaeva became the chairwoman of the board of directors of the National Media Group. As of 2025, Kabaeva is the head coach of rhythmic gymnastics in Russia, replacing her former coach Irina Viner.

== Early life and family ==
Kabaeva was born on 12 May 1983 in Tashkent, Uzbek SSR, Soviet Union. She was the daughter of Lyubov Kabaeva and Marat Kabayev, a professional football player. Her father is a Muslim Tatar and her mother is Russian. Her younger sister, Leysan Kabaeva is the general director of a real estate agency and in 2016 was appointed as a judge of the Almetyevsk City Court in Tatarstan by Russian president Vladimir Putin. Due to Marat's career, the family often travelled to different places in Uzbekistan, Kazakhstan and Russia.

== Rhythmic gymnastics career ==
=== Early career ===
Kabaeva started rhythmic gymnastics at age three with coach Margarita Samuilovna. At age seven, her mother took her to a club in Tashkent, where she was turned away for being too heavy. In 1993, she represented Kazakhstan at an international competition in Japan.

At the age of 12, Kabaeva moved to Moscow. There her mother took her to the Russian head coach, Irina Viner. Viner initially thought she was too short and overweight for gymnastics, but she decided to accept her after watching her practice and seeing her flexibility and jumps. However, she insisted that Kabaeva lose weight immediately; Kabaeva was only allowed to have water for three days, and she was put on a strict diet while training intensively. Kabaeva later said that she begged Viner for food. Kabaeva's mother initially returned to Tashkent, though she called and visited frequently until she moved to Moscow with Kabaeva's younger sister.

=== 1996–1999 ===
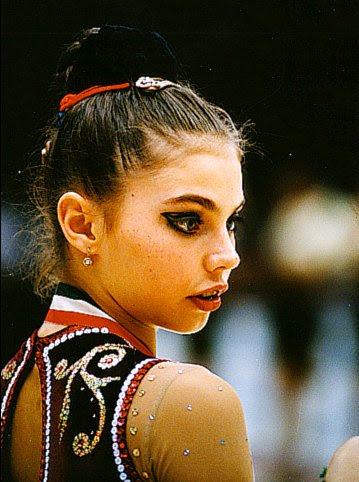
Kabaeva at the 1999 European Championships

Kabaeva made her international debut representing Russia in 1996 and won two silver all-around medals, both behind Yulia Raskina. The next year, she won every junior event she competed in and placed 4th in the senior category at the Russian Championships.

In 1998, her first year as an international senior, the 15-year-old Kabaeva won the 1998 European Championships in Portugal. At the time, she was the youngest member of the Russian squad. Kabaeva was competing alongside internationally recognized teammates such as Amina Zaripova, Yana Batyrshina and Irina Tchachina. Later that year, she won the World Youth Games, held in Moscow. She also won three of the four event finals at the 1998 Goodwill Games.

Kabaeva then became the 1999 European Champion in Hungary and won the 1999 World title in Osaka, Japan. Kabaeva went on to win a total of 5 all-around titles at the European Championships.

At the 2000 Sydney Olympics, in Australia, Kabaeva was expected to win the gold medal in the all-around; however, due to an error in an otherwise clean performance—she dropped her hoop, and ran to retrieve it outside of the competition area. Kabaeva won the bronze medal with the final score of 39.466 (Rope 9.925, Hoop 9.641, Ball 9.950, Ribbon 9.950). Belarus's Yulia Raskina took the silver medal, while fellow Russian teammate, Yulia Barsukova, won the Olympic gold medal.

=== 2001–2004 ===
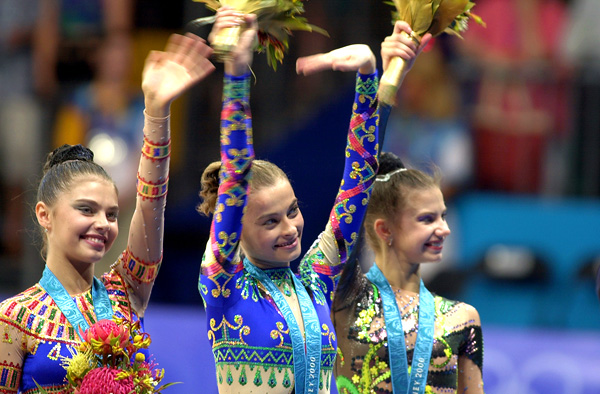
(L–R) Alina Kabaeva (bronze), Yulia Barsukova (gold) and Yulia Raskina (silver) at 2000 Olympic Games podium

At the 2001 World Championships in Madrid, Spain, Kabaeva won the gold medal for the ball, clubs, hoop, rope, the individual all around, and the team competition. Then at the 2001 Goodwill Games in Brisbane Australia, Kabaeva won the gold medal in the ball, clubs, and rope; and the silver in the individual all around and hoop. However, Kabaeva and her teammate, Irina Tchachina, tested positive to a banned diuretic (furosemide), and were stripped of their medals.

Viner, the Russian head coach, who also served as the vice president of the FIG at the time, said her gymnasts had been taking a food supplement called "Hyper", that contained mild diuretics, which, according to Viner, the gymnasts were taking for premenstrual syndrome. When the supply ran out shortly before the Goodwill Games, the team physiotherapist restocked at a local pharmacy. According to Viner, the supplement sold there was fake and contained furosemide. The committee requested that the Goodwill Games organizing committee nullify Kabaeva and Tchachina's results. The FIG also nullified their results from the world championships in Madrid, causing Ukraine's Tamara Yerofeeva to be declared the 2001 world champion. Kabaeva was not allowed to participate in competitions from August 2001 to August 2002. Her first international competition after the ban was the 2002 European Championships, where she took first place in the individual all-around.

Kabaeva won the 2003 World Title in Budapest, Hungary. Kabaeva won the all around gold medal. at the 2003 World Championships, as well as the event final gold in ribbon and ball ahead of Anna Bessonova of Ukraine.

In 2004, Kabaeva won the all around gold medal at the 2004 European Championships in Kyiv, Ukraine. At the 2004 Athens Olympics Greece, Kabaeva won the gold medal in the individual all around, with a score of 108.400 (hoop 26.800, ball 27.350, clubs 27.150, ribbon 27.100), the silver medal went to her teammate, Irina Tchachina.

=== 2005–2008 ===
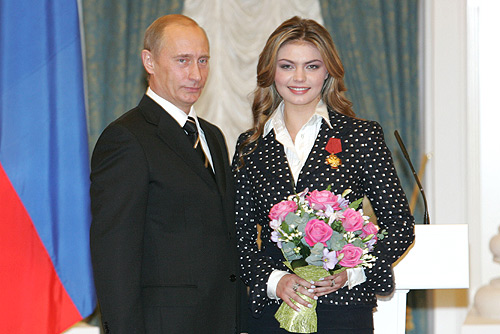
President Vladimir Putin presented Kabaeva with the Order "For Merit to the Fatherland", IV degree, in 2005

In October 2004, Kabaeva announced her retirement from the sport. However, in June 2005, the Russian Head Coach Irina Viner announced a possible comeback. Kabaeva resumed her sport career at an Italy-Russia friendly competition in Genoa, on 10 September 2005. On 5 March 2006, Kabaeva won the Gazprom Moscow Grand Prix, with fellow Russians Vera Sessina and Olga Kapranova, taking the Second and Third places. Kabaeva won the silver medal in All-Around at the 2006 European Championships, behind her teammate, Sessina.

At the 2007 European Championships in Baku, Azerbaijan; Kabaeva, Sessina, and Kapranova were chosen to represent Russia. However, on the eve of the competition, Kabaeva withdrew due to an injury. Viner selected rising upcoming gymnast Evgenia Kanaeva from Russia's National Team as the replacement. Kabaeva finished fourth in all-around qualifications at the 2007 World Championships but did not advance into the finals due to the two per country rule, with Vera Sessina and Olga Kapranova placing ahead of her. Kabaeva did qualify for the ribbon final where she won a bronze medal behind Sessina and Ukraine's Anna Bessonova. Plans for Kabaeva's participation in the Beijing 2008 Olympics were repeatedly announced, but this did not come to fruition.

=== Contributions to rhythmic gymnastics ===
Kabaeva revolutionized rhythmic gymnastics as one of the few gymnasts to have performed new skills and elements, including the back split pivot with hand help (also known as "The Kabaeva"), the ring position with a slow full turn, and the backscale pivot that she first performed.

=== Rhythmic gymnastic achievements ===
- Won the 1998 European Championships in the all-around in Porto, Portugal, at 15 years of age, the youngest ever to do so.
- Leveled with Elena Karpukhina as one of the youngest Rhythmic Gymnast to win the All-Around World Championships in 1999 Osaka at 16 years old, until Yana Kudryavtseva of the Russian Federation broke the record winning the All-Around 2013 World Championships at 15 years old.
- Performed the backscale pivot first.
- Holds the record for the most European All-Around titles, in 1998, 1999, 2000, 2002, and 2004.
- Won all Grand-slam titles, and is only one of the three rhythmic gymnasts (with Ekaterina Serebrianskaya and Evgenia Kanaeva) ever to do so. The titles are: Olympics, World Championships, European Championships, World Cup Final, and Grand Prix Final.
- Became a six time Russian National All-Around Champion, in 1999, 2000, 2001, 2004, 2006, and 2007.

=== Detailed Olympic results ===
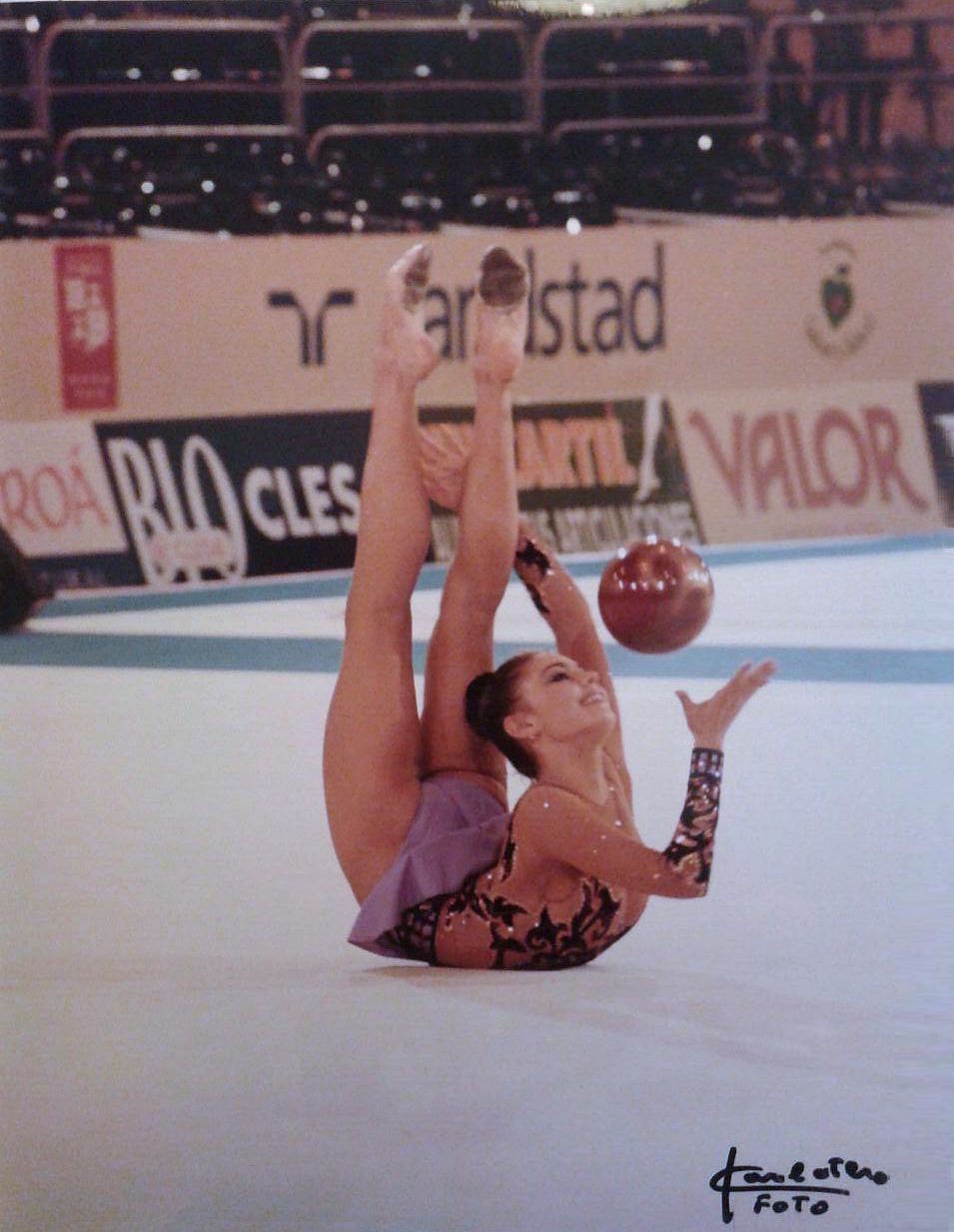
Kabaeva at the 2001 World Rhythmic Gymnastics Championships

Year	Competition Description	Location	Music	Apparatus	Score-Final	Score-Qualifying
2004	Olympics	Athens		All-around	108.400	105.875
2004	Olympics	Athens	Sphynx by Giampiero Ponte	Ribbon	27.100	26.100
2004	Olympics	Athens	Syrtaki by D. Moutsis	Ball	27.350	27.250
2004	Olympics	Athens	Carmen's entrance and Habanera by Georges Bizet	Hoop	26.800	26.050
2004	Olympics	Athens	Sphynx (Club Mix) by Giampiero Ponte, Moran	Clubs	27.150	26.475
Year	Competition Description	Location	Music	Apparatus	Score-Final	Score-Qualifying
2000	Olympics	Sydney		All-around	39.466	39.691
2000	Olympics	Sydney	Dilorom / Yor Yor by Yulduz Usmanova and Shahzod	Ribbon	9.950	9.925
2000	Olympics	Sydney	Felicia by Luis Bravo	Ball	9.950	9.925
2000	Olympics	Sydney	Les Toreadors by Georges Bizet	Hoop	9.651	9.925
2000	Olympics	Sydney	Tsyganochka	Rope	9.925	9.916

=== Post-retirement activity ===
Kabaeva was among the six Russian athlete torch bearers who carried the Olympic flame through Fisht Stadium during the Opening Ceremony of the 2014 Sochi Winter Olympics. Her selection as a torch bearer generated controversy in the international media because of her alleged close relationship with President Vladimir Putin.

In 2015, Kabaeva was an honorary guest at the 2015 World Championships in Stuttgart, Germany. In 2017, she became the official FIG Rhythmic Gymnastics Ambassador at the 2017 World Championships in Pesaro, Italy.

== Political and media careers ==
Since 2005, Kabaeva has been a member of the Public Chamber of Russia. Since February 2008, she has been chairwoman of the Public Council of the National Media Group, the media group that controls Izvestia, Channel One and REN TV.

Between 2007 and 2014, Kabaeva was a Member of the Russian Parliament, the State Duma, representing Nizhnekamsk as a member of the United Russia party. In her capacity as a Member of Parliament, she voted for a number of controversial laws that were quickly adopted in 2012 and 2013. This included the Anti-Magnitsky bill, which banned inter-country adoption of Russian orphans by families in the United States, as well as the Russian gay propaganda law making the distribution of "propaganda of non-traditional sexual relationships" among minors a punishable offense. Another example is the extrajudicial ban on access to websites which may host materials violating copyright laws, and the reorganization of the Academy of Sciences.

In September 2014, Kabaeva resigned from the Duma and accepted the position of chair of the board of directors of the National Media Group, the largest Russian media conglomerate. She has faced criticism for her lack of experience and high salary when appointed to political and media posts.

== Other ventures ==
In 2001, Kabaeva appeared in the Japanese movie, Red Shadow, performing a gymnastics routine andin January 2011, Kabaeva appeared on the cover of Vogue Russia. In the same month, she launched her singing career, taking to the stage for the first time.

== Sanctions ==
Following the Russian invasion of Ukraine, sanctions were imposed on numerous Russian political and business leaders. In April 2022, the United States Department of the Treasury prepared sanctions against Kabaeva, however the United States government withheld the sanctions for fear of escalating tensions between Russia and the United States due to her alleged relationship with Putin. The Office of Foreign Assets Control added Kabaeva to the Specially Designated Nationals and Blocked Persons List on 3 August 2022, which results in her assets being frozen and U.S. persons being prohibited from dealing with her.

On 13 May 2022, Kabaeva and her grandmother Anna Zatseplina were sanctioned by the United Kingdom. On 27 May, Canada imposed sanctions on Kabaeva herself. On 3 June, she was sanctioned by the European Union and on 1 July, she was sanctioned by Australia.

== Personal life ==
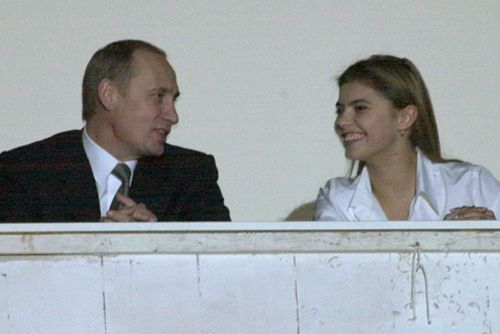
President Vladimir Putin and Kabaeva at the 2001 Russian Rhythmic Gymnastics Championships

In April 2008, the Moskovsky Korrespondent reported that Kabaeva was engaged to Russian president Vladimir Putin. The story was denied and the newspaper was shut down. In the following years, the status of Kabaeva and Putin's relationship became a topic of speculation, including allegations that they have multiple children together.

In July 2013, Kabaeva said that she did not have children. In March 2015, she was reported to have given birth to a daughter at the VIP hospital of Saint Ann in Ticino, Switzerland. In 2019, she reportedly gave birth to twin sons at the Kulakov maternity clinic in Moscow. However, the Swiss newspaper SonntagsZeitung reported in 2022 that a Swiss gynecologist of Russian origin assisted at both births, stating that the first in 2015 was of a boy and the second in 2019 of another boy, and that both were Putin's sons.

According to United States and European security officials, Kabaeva has spent long periods of time in Switzerland since 2015, at residences in Lugano and Cologny.

== Honours ==
- Russia:
  - Honoured Master of Sports of the Russian Federation (1999)
  - Order of Friendship (2001)
  - Order "For Merit to the Fatherland" IV Degree (2005)
  - Russian Federation Presidential Certificate of Honour (2013)
- South Ossetia: Order of Honour (2015)
