= Anastasia Zyurkalova =

Ukrainian stage and film actress

Anastasia Ziurkalova
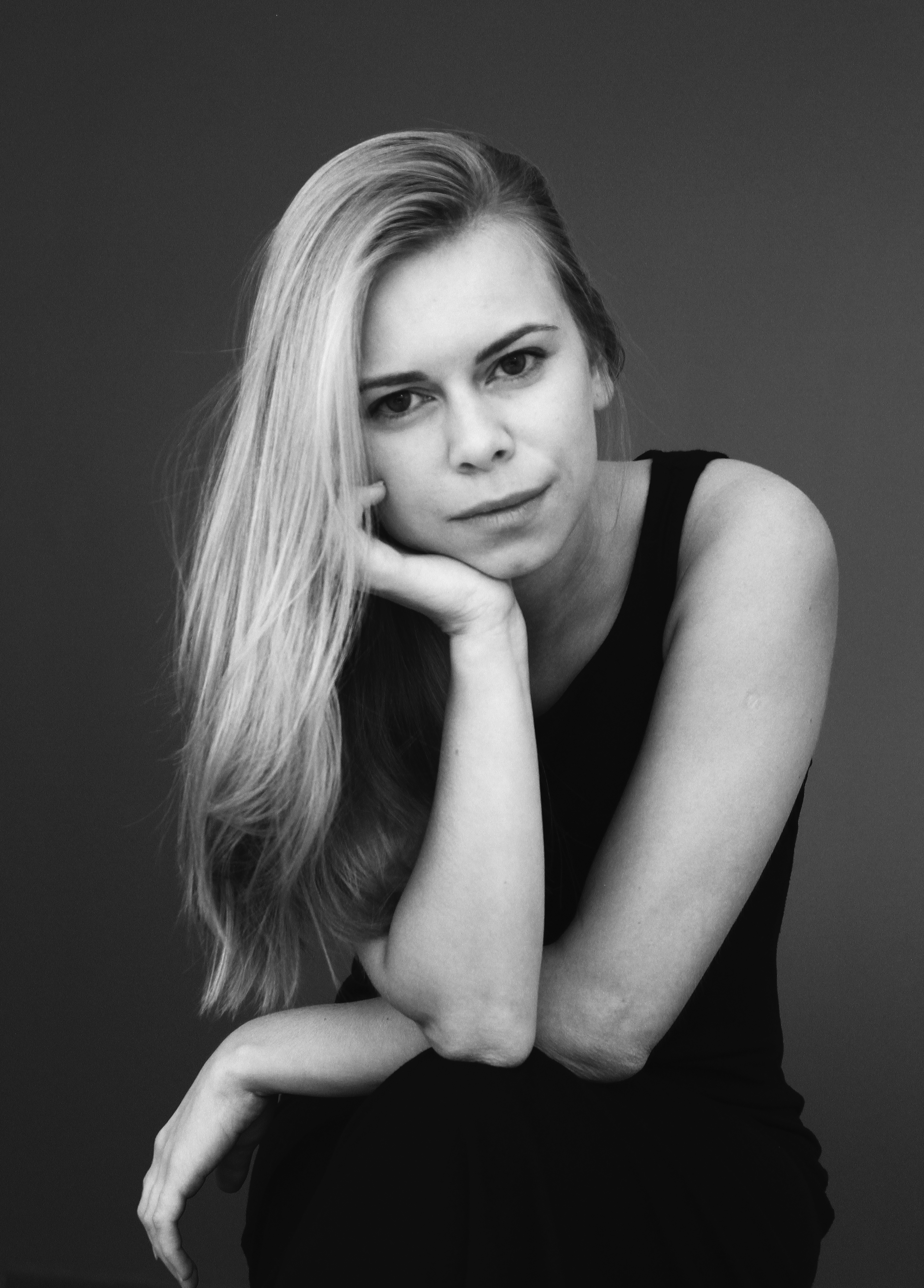
- Born: Anastasia Dmytrivna Ziurkalova; 23 October 1991 (age 33); Kyiv, Ukraine
- Occupation: Actress
- Years active: 2002–present
- Height: 155cm (5 ft 1 in)
- Parent(s): Dmytro Ziurkalov; Oksana Omelianchyk

Anastasia Dmytrivna Ziurkalova (Ukrainian: Анастасія Дмитрівна Зюркалова; born 23 October 1991) is a Ukrainian stage and film actress. She is best known for roles in the film Aurora (2006) and TV series The Sniffer (2015).

== Career ==
In the cinema, Anastasia happened to be by chance, having got to the casting of the film studio, where she was chosen by more than one hundred candidates. Prior to that, she had attended an art studio for several years, was engaged in swimming, photography and drawing, and studied foreign languages in depth. She studied at the Kyiv model studio. After her first film role, she firmly decided to become a professional actress. Director Oksana Bairak shot Nastya starring many of her films. The role of the girl from Pripyat in the film Aurora was written specifically for her.

Nastya's debut on the professional theatre stage took place in spring 2014.

In 2016, Anastasia Ziurkalova graduated with honours from Kyiv Theatre University (workshop of the Peoples Artist of Ukraine Mykola Rushkovskyi).

Anastasia Zyurkalova gives lessons in the Champion Kids children's club in the field of acting.
