= 2002 European Rhythmic Gymnastics Championships =

2002 Rhythmic Gymnastics European Championships
- Location: Granada, Spain
- Start date: 9 November 2002
- End date: 10 November 2002

The 18th Rhythmic Gymnastics European Championships were held in Granada, Spain, from 9 to 10 November 2002. Medals were contested in two disciplines : team competition and senior individual all-around.

== Medal winners ==
Event	Gold	Silver	Bronze
Team Competition
Team	Russia; Alina Kabaeva; Zarina Gizikova; Vera Sessina	Ukraine; Tamara Yerofeeva; Anna Bessonova	Bulgaria; Simona Peycheva; Elizabeth Paysieva
Senior Individual
All-Around	Alina Kabaeva; Russia	Tamara Yerofeeva; Ukraine	Anna Bessonova; Ukraine

== Medal table ==
Rank	Nation	Gold	Silver	Bronze	Total
1	Russia (RUS)	2	0	0	2
2	Ukraine (UKR)	0	2	1	3
3	Bulgaria (BUL)	0	0	1	1
Totals (3 entries)		2	2	2	6
