= 2007 Rhythmic Gymnastics European Championships =

- Location: Baku, Azerbaijan
- Start date: 29 June 2007
- End date: 1 July 2007

The 23rd Rhythmic Gymnastics European Championships were held in Baku, Azerbaijan from 29 June to 1 July 2007.

== Medal winners ==
| Event | Gold | Silver | Bronze |
|---|---|---|---|
Senior Finals
| Team | Russia; Yevgeniya Kanayeva; Olga Kapranova; Vera Sessina | Ukraine; Anna Bessonova; Natalia Godunko | Azerbaijan; Aliya Garayeva; Dinara Gimatova; Anna Gurbanova |
| Rope | Aliya Garayeva; Azerbaijan | Vera Sessina; Russia | Olga Kapranova; Russia |
| Hoop | Olga Kapranova; Russia | Anna Bessonova; Ukraine | Vera Sessina; Russia |
| Clubs | Vera Sessina; Russia | Olga Kapranova; Russia | Anna Bessonova; Ukraine |
| Ribbon | Yevgeniya Kanayeva; Russia | Anna Bessonova; Ukraine | Vera Sessina; Russia |
Junior Groups Finals
| 5 clubs | Russia; Uliana Donskova; Daria Andronova; Alexandra Elyutina; Karina Khayretdinova; Natalia Nekhozhina; Mariya Yakimenko | Bulgaria; Romina Bozhilova; Magika Dimitrova; Kristina Ilieva; Gabriela Kirova; Elena Todorova; Stefani Trayanova | Belarus; Hanna Arlouskaya; Aryna Bukachova; Anhelina Hladkaya; Anastasiya Kharytonava; Alesia Osipava; Melitina Staniouta |

== Results ==
=== Senior ===
==== Team ====
| Rank | Nation | Rope (rhythmic gymnastics) | Hoop (rhythmic gymnastics) | Clubs (rhythmic gymnastics) | Ribbon (rhythmic gymnastics) | Total |
|---|---|---|---|---|---|---|
| 1st place, gold medalist(s) | Russia | 35.800 | 35.975 | 35.000 | 35.675 | 142.450 |
| 2nd place, silver medalist(s) | Ukraine | 33.950 | 35.300 | 33.950 | 34.725 | 137.925 |
| 3rd place, bronze medalist(s) | Azerbaijan | 33.575 | 32.725 | 32.625 | 34.500 | 133.425 |
| 4 | Belarus | 32.700 | 33.550 | 32.750 | 32.700 | 131.700 |
| 5 | Israel | 31.575 | 32.475 | 31.925 | 31.425 | 127.400 |
| 6 | Bulgaria | 31.650 | 32.000 | 32.075 | 30.550 | 126.275 |
| 7 | Spain | 29.725 | 30.950 | 29.900 | 27.600 | 118.175 |
| 8 | Greece | 29.300 | 29.800 | 29.175 | 28.175 | 116.450 |
| 9 | Austria | 29.325 | 29.175 | 29.150 | 28.600 | 116.250 |
| 10 | Estonia | 28.675 | 28.125 | 29.400 | 29.275 | 115.475 |
| 11 | Slovenia | 28.525 | 28.800 | 29.450 | 27.650 | 114.425 |
| 12 | Italy | 29.500 | 28.350 | 29.325 | 26.700 | 113.875 |
| 13 | Georgia | 29.300 | 27.325 | 29.175 | 27.550 | 113.350 |
| 14 | Czech Republic | 28.575 | 27.575 | 28.650 | 26.700 | 111.500 |
| 15 | Poland | 26.700 | 29.200 | 28.100 | 26.550 | 110.550 |
| 16 | Germany | 26.975 | 27.850 | 26.400 | 28.625 | 109.850 |
| 17 | Finland | 27.775 | 27.375 | 26.775 | 27.200 | 109.125 |
| 18 | Portugal | 26.475 | 27.075 | 27.025 | 27.475 | 108.050 |
| 19 | Hungary | 26.100 | 27.675 | 26.725 | 26.650 | 107.150 |
| 20 | Cyprus | 27.425 | 26.000 | 26.800 | 23.275 | 103.500 |
| 21 | Great Britain | 26.800 | 25.550 | 25.650 | 25.475 | 103.475 |
| 22 | Slovakia | 25.900 | 25.175 | 26.550 | 25.625 | 103.250 |
| 23 | Latvia | 23.700 | 25.925 | 25.300 | 25.975 | 100.900 |
| 24 | Turkey | 22.250 | 26.125 | 25.475 | 24.850 | 98.700 |
| 25 | Norway | 23.175 | 25.750 | 24.575 | 24.075 | 97.575 |
| 26 | Moldova | 23.675 | 24.325 | 24.950 | 24.525 | 97.475 |
| 27 | Croatia | 24.750 | 23.975 | 23.450 | 22.575 | 94.750 |
| 28 | Belgium | 22.725 | 23.750 | 23.400 | 22.725 | 92.600 |
| 29 | Lithuania | 22.325 | 22.225 | 20.500 | 21.200 | 86.250 |

==== Rope ====
| Rank | Gymnast | Nation | D Score | A Score | E Score | Pen. | Total |
|---|---|---|---|---|---|---|---|
| 1st place, gold medalist(s) | Aliya Garayeva | Azerbaijan | 8.900 | 8.800 | 9.300 | | 18.150 |
| 2nd place, silver medalist(s) | Vera Sessina | Russia | 9.100 | 9.000 | 9.000 | | 18.050 |
| 3rd place, bronze medalist(s) | Olga Kapranova | Russia | 9.200 | 8.700 | 8.800 | | 17.750 |
| 4 | Natalia Godunko | Ukraine | 8.800 | 8.600 | 9.000 | | 17.700 |
| 5 | Anna Bessonova | Ukraine | 8.800 | 8.700 | 8.650 | | 17.400 |
| 6 | Almudena Cid | Spain | 8.500 | 8.600 | 8.400 | 0.05 | 16.900 |
| 7 | Anna Gurbanova | Azerbaijan | 7.900 | 7.900 | 8.700 | 0.05 | 16.550 |
| 8 | Svetlana Rudalova | Belarus | 7.300 | 8.150 | 8.400 | | 16.125 |

==== Hoop ====
| Rank | Gymnast | Nation | D Score | A Score | E Score | Pen. | Total |
|---|---|---|---|---|---|---|---|
| 1st place, gold medalist(s) | Olga Kapranova | Russia | 9.200 | 9.050 | 9.200 | | 18.325 |
| 2nd place, silver medalist(s) | Anna Bessonova | Ukraine | 9.000 | 8.900 | 9.100 | | 18.050 |
| 3rd place, bronze medalist(s) | Vera Sessina | Russia | 8.700 | 8.900 | 8.800 | | 17.600 |
| 4 | Simona Peycheva | Bulgaria | 8.600 | 8.850 | 8.800 | 0.05 | 17.475 |
| 5 | Natalia Godunko | Ukraine | 8.700 | 8.400 | 8.800 | | 17.350 |
| 6 | Svetlana Rudalova | Belarus | 8.200 | 8.750 | 8.400 | | 16.875 |
| 7 | Irina Risenson | Israel | 8.100 | 8.400 | 8.600 | | 16.850 |
| 8 | Almudena Cid | Spain | 7.900 | 8.000 | 8.200 | | 16.150 |

==== Clubs ====
| Rank | Gymnast | Nation | D Score | A Score | E Score | Pen. | Total |
|---|---|---|---|---|---|---|---|
| 1st place, gold medalist(s) | Vera Sessina | Russia | 8.900 | 9.100 | 9.000 | | 18.000 |
| 2nd place, silver medalist(s) | Olga Kapranova | Russia | 9.050 | 9.050 | 9.000 | 0.05 | 18.000 |
| 3rd place, bronze medalist(s) | Anna Bessonova | Ukraine | 8.700 | 8.900 | 9.050 | | 17.850 |
| 4 | Aliya Garayeva | Azerbaijan | 8.700 | 9.000 | 8.900 | | 17.750 |
| 5 | Natalia Godunko | Ukraine | 8.400 | 8.650 | 8.950 | | 17.425 |
| 6 | Svetlana Rudalova | Belarus | 8.250 | 8.600 | 8.700 | | 17.125 |
| 7 | Simona Peycheva | Bulgaria | 8.300 | 8.650 | 8.500 | | 16.975 |
| 8 | Anna Gurbanova | Azerbaijan | 8.100 | 8.400 | 8.500 | | 16.750 |

==== Ribbon ====
| Rank | Gymnast | Nation | D Score | A Score | E Score | Pen. | Total |
|---|---|---|---|---|---|---|---|
| 1st place, gold medalist(s) | Yevgeniya Kanayeva | Russia | 9.100 | 9.150 | 9.150 | | 18.275 |
| 2nd place, silver medalist(s) | Anna Bessonova | Ukraine | 8.950 | 8.950 | 9.200 | 0.05 | 18.100 |
| 3rd place, bronze medalist(s) | Vera Sessina | Russia | 9.000 | 9.050 | 8.800 | | 17.825 |
| 4 | Aliya Garayeva | Azerbaijan | 9.000 | 8.950 | 8.700 | | 17.675 |
| 5 | Natalia Godunko | Ukraine | 8.300 | 8.750 | 8.850 | | 17.375 |
| 6 | Simona Peycheva | Bulgaria | 8.350 | 8.700 | 8.800 | 0.05 | 17.275 |
| 7 | Dinara Gimatova | Azerbaijan | 8.100 | 8.650 | 8.600 | | 16.975 |
| 8 | Irina Risenson | Israel | 8.100 | 8.150 | 8.200 | | 16.325 |

=== Junior ===
==== Group 10 clubs ====
| Rank | Nation | D Score | A Score | E Score | Pen. | Total |
|---|---|---|---|---|---|---|
| 1st place, gold medalist(s) | Russia | 7.200 | 9.150 | 18.600 | 0.20 | 26.575 |
| 2nd place, silver medalist(s) | Bulgaria | 7.050 | 8.700 | 18.000 | | 25.875 |
| 3rd place, bronze medalist(s) | Belarus | 6.900 | 8.450 | 17.300 | | 24.975 |
| 4 | Azerbaijan | 6.250 | 8.550 | 17.100 | | 24.500 |
| 5 | Israel | 6.150 | 8.600 | 17.100 | | 24.475 |
| 6 | Ukraine | 6.600 | 8.000 | 17.100 | | 24.400 |
| 7 | Spain | 6.050 | 8.100 | 16.900 | | 23.975 |
| 8 | Hungary | 5.900 | 7.700 | 16.000 | | 22.800 |

== Medals table ==
| Rank | Nation | Gold | Silver | Bronze | Total |
|---|---|---|---|---|---|
| 1 | Russia (RUS) | 5 | 2 | 3 | 10 |
| 2 | Azerbaijan (AZE) | 1 | 0 | 1 | 2 |
| 3 | Ukraine (UKR) | 0 | 3 | 1 | 4 |
| 4 | Bulgaria (BUL) | 0 | 1 | 0 | 1 |
| 5 | Belarus (BLR) | 0 | 0 | 1 | 1 |
| Totals (5 entries) | | 6 | 6 | 6 | 18 |
