= Natalia Godunko =

Ukrainian rhythmic gymnast

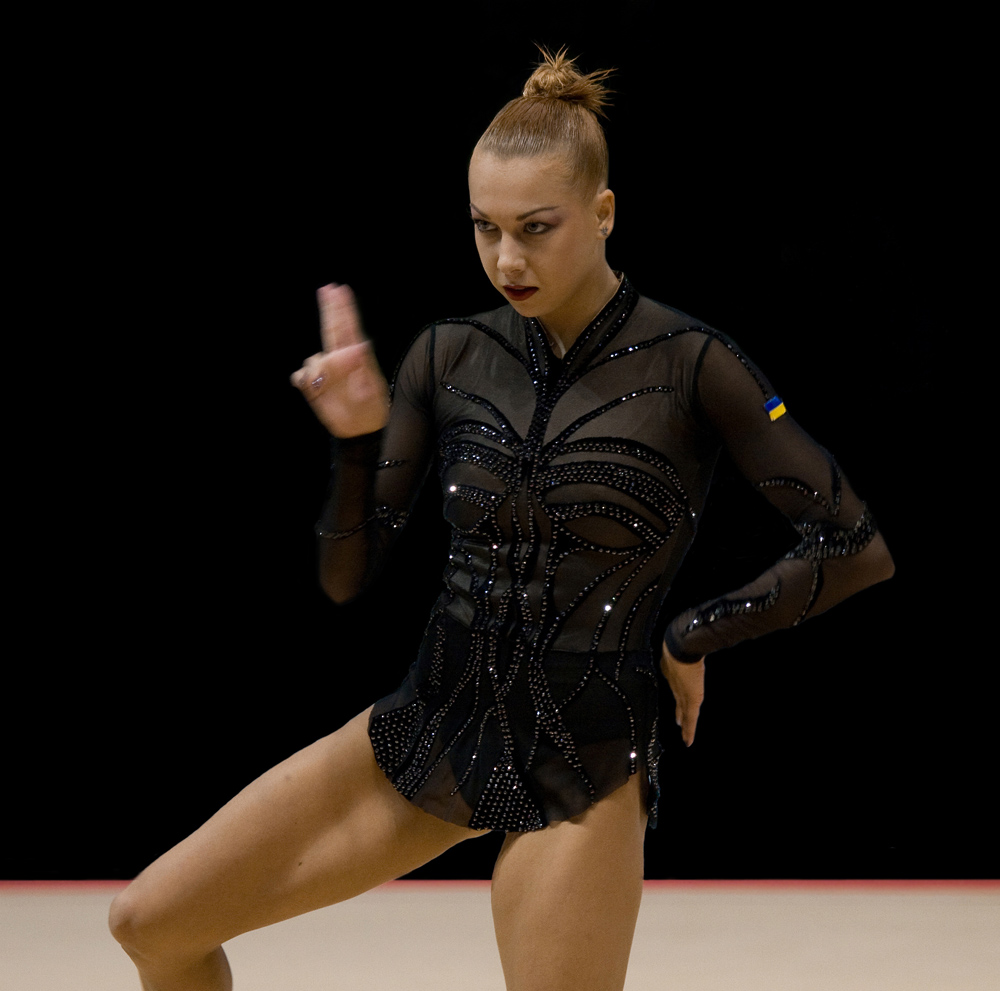

Personal information
- Full name: Natalia Oleksandrivna Godunko
- Alternative names: Nataliia Godunko; Nataliya Hodunko
- Born: 5 December 1984 (age 41) Kiev, Ukrainian SSR, Soviet Union

Gymnastics career
- Discipline: Rhythmic gymnastics
- Country represented: Ukraine (1998–2010)
- Club: Deriugins School
- Head coach: Albina Deriugina
- Assistant coach: Irina Deriugina
- Retired: 2010
Medal record
Rhythmic gymnastics
Representing Ukraine
World Championships
Gold medal – first place	2001 Madrid	Team
Gold medal – first place	2002 New Orleans	5 ribbons
Silver medal – second place	2003 Budapest	Team
Silver medal – second place	2005 Baku	Team
Bronze medal – third place	2005 Baku	Ribbon
European Championships
Gold medal – first place	2005 Moscow	Ribbon
Silver medal – second place	2001 Geneva	5 clubs
Silver medal – second place	2002 Granada	Team
Silver medal – second place	2004 Kyiv	Team
Silver medal – second place	2005 Moscow	Team
Silver medal – second place	2007 Baku	Team
European Team Championships
Silver medal – second place	2003 Moscow	Team
World Cup Final
Gold medal – first place	2006 Mie	Rope
Silver medal – second place	2006 Mie	Ribbon
Bronze medal – third place	2006 Mie	Clubs
Bronze medal – third place	2008 Benidorm	Hoop
Grand Prix Final
Gold medal – first place	2004 Deventer	All-around
Gold medal – first place	2004 Deventer	Ball
Gold medal – first place	2004 Deventer	Ribbon
Gold medal – first place	2005 Berlin	Ribbon
Silver medal – second place	2003 Innsbruck	Ribbon
Silver medal – second place	2004 Deventer	Clubs
Silver medal – second place	2004 Deventer	Hoop
Bronze medal – third place	2003 Innsbruck	All-around
Bronze medal – third place	2003 Innsbruck	Clubs
Bronze medal – third place	2005 Berlin	Rope
Bronze medal – third place	2006 Berlin	Ball
Bronze medal – third place	2006 Berlin	Clubs
Bronze medal – third place	2006 Berlin	Ribbon
World Games
Silver medal – second place	2005 Duisburg	Ribbon
Bronze medal – third place	2005 Duisburg	Rope
Bronze medal – third place	2005 Duisburg	Clubs
Summer Universiade
Gold medal – first place	2005 Izmir	Ribbon
Silver medal – second place	2005 Izmir	Ball
Silver medal – second place	2005 Izmir	Clubs
Silver medal – second place	2005 Izmir	Rope
Silver medal – second place	2007 Bangkok	Ball
Bronze medal – third place	2005 Izmir	All-around
Bronze medal – third place	2007 Bangkok	Rope

Natalia Oleksandrivna Godunko (Ukrainian: Наталія Олександрівна Годунко; Russian: Наталья Александровна Годунко, born 5 December 1984) is a Ukrainian former rhythmic gymnast. She is the 2001 team all-around world champion, 2005 European ribbon champion and the 2004 Grand Prix Final all-around champion.

== Personal life ==
Godunko was born in Kyiv, in the Ukrainian SSR of the Soviet Union (in present-day Ukraine).

Godunko online auctioned her Team All-Around gold medal won in the 2001 World Rhythmic Gymnastics Championships to support the Ukrainian army who at the time was fighting a war in Donbas.

== Career ==
=== Junior ===
Godunko started training in rhythmic gymnastics in 1990 at age six. She trained in Kyiv under the mother/daughter coaching team of Albina and Irina Deriugina. Her coaches did not notice her for a while—she was not tall with long legs, which was preferred by the Deriugins School—but her speed and technique with apparatus and on elements eventually attracted their attention.

In 1998, Godunko became a member of the Ukrainian national team and competed as a junior at the World Youth Games in Moscow, placing sixth.

=== Senior ===
As a senior, Godunko competed as part of the Ukrainian group for several years, as well as occasionally competing in individual events with little success. With the Ukrainian group, she won the 2001 World Championship team all-around and the five ribbons gold medal at the 2002 World Championships. She was the third-ranked gymnast in Ukraine for a while. She began her breakthrough at the 2002 Ukrainian Nationals, winning bronze in all-round and all gold medals in the finals. In 2003, she competed in ball at her first Grand Prix, the Deriugina Cup, and then competed in hoop and ribbon at the Holon Grand Prix and in ribbon at the Berlin Grand Prix. She won the bronze all-around medal at the 2003 Grand Prix Final in Innsbruck, Austria.

At the 2004 Athens Olympics, Godunko qualified in fourth with a score of 102.750. In the final, she scored: ribbon 26.125, clubs 26.375, ball 25.800, hoop 25.500, and finished fifth overall behind Kazakh gymnast Aliya Yussupova. She won the 2004 Grand Prix Final in all-around and won two more gold medals in ball and ribbon.

In 2005, Godunko was a rival to Anna Bessonova for the position of Ukraine's top gymnast. In front of a home audience, Godunko won the Deriugina Cup title. She was the only Ukrainian to win a gold medal, in ribbon, at the 2005 European Championships. At the 2005 World Championships, Godunko won team silver and ribbon bronze.

In 2006, Godunko won gold in rope, silver in ribbon and bronze in clubs at the Mie World Cup. She won bronze in hoop at the Benidorm World Cup. At the Berlin Grand Prix she won bronzes in ball, clubs and ribbon.

In 2007, she won team silver at the European Championships, as well as ball silver and rope bronze at the Summer Universiade.

At the 2008 Summer Olympics, Godunko finished seventh in the all-around finals with an overall score of 68.850 points.

She briefly returned to competition in 2010, competing at the 2010 World Championships where she finished 18th all-around.

== Routine music information ==
Year	Apparatus	Music title
2010	Hoop	Smooth Criminal music from Encore! by David Garrett
2010	Rope	Hot Fuji music from The Fast and the Furious: Tokyo Drift by Brian Tyler
2010	Ball	Palladio music from Escala by Escala
2010	Ribbon	"Grand Guignol" from Mar dulce by Bajofondo
2008	Hoop	Night on Bald Mountain by Modest Mussorgsky
2008	Rope	Gopak (Ukrainian traditional)
2008	Clubs	"L'estate" (Summer) 3. Presto music from The Four Seasons Concerto No. 2 in G minor, Op. 8, RV 315 by Vivaldi
2008	Ribbon	Tsyganochka
2007	Hoop	Night on Bald Mountain by Modest Mussorgsky
2007	Rope	Act 1 finale Death of Giselle, Love Scene music from Giselle by Adolphe Adam
2007	Clubs	Better Have Some Ky / Dazzle Me / You Can Save Her music from Déjà Vu by Harry Gregson-Williams
2007	Ribbon	Beirut Taxi music from Syriana by Alexandre Desplat
2006	Ball (second)	Santa Maria (Del Buen Ayre) by Gotan project
2006	Ball (first)	Attack music from Pearl Harbor by Hans Zimmer
2006	Rope	Act 1 finale Death of Giselle, Love Scene music from Giselle by Adolphe Adam
2006	Clubs	Gopak (Ukrainian traditional)
2006	Ribbon	Night Borders / Camel Race / Main Theme music from The Mummy by Jerry Goldsmith
2005	Ball	Taped Evidence / Cat and Mouse music from Paparazzi by Brian Tyler
2005	Rope	La Goutte D'Or by Saint Germain
2005	Clubs	Gopak (Ukrainian traditional)
2005	Ribbon	Bumble Bee Boogie by Robert Wells
2004	Hoop	Suite No. 2: Entrance of the Merchants – Dance of a Roman Courtesan – General Dance music from Spartacus Suite by Aram Khachaturian
2004	Ball	Technologicque Park by Orbital
2004	Clubs	Tetsujin music from The Matrix Revolutions by Juno Reactor and Don Davis
2004	Ribbon	Bumble Bee Boogie by Robert Wells
2003	Hoop	Session / Zion / Mona Lisa Overdrive music from The Matrix Reloaded by Linkin Park / Fluke / Don Davis & Juno Reactor
2003	Ball	Ruby Rap / The Diva Dance music from The Fifth Element by Éric Serra
2003	Clubs	Movement X music from Mythodea by Vangelis
2003	Ribbon	Bumble Bee Boogie by Robert Wells
2002	Hoop	Revisiting The Race, The Race music from The Skulls by Randy Edelman
2002	Rope	Sing! Sing! Sing! (Part 1) / Sing! Sing! Sing! (Part 2) by Bob Fosse
2002	Clubs	Movement X music from Mythodea by Vangelis
2002	Ball	Heat Miser by Massive Attack

== Detailed Olympic results ==
Year	Competition Description	Location	Music	Apparatus	Score-Final	Score-Qualifying
2008	Olympics	Beijing		All-around	68.850	69.400
2008	Olympics	Beijing	Night On Bald Mountain by Modest Moussorgsky	Hoop	17.500	17.375
2008	Olympics	Beijing	Hopak – Ukrainian Folk	Rope	16.700	17.500
2008	Olympics	Beijing	"L'estate" (Summer) 3. Presto by Vivaldi	Clubs	17.525	17.650
2008	Olympics	Beijing	Tsiganochka / Gypsy Girl	Ribbon	17.125	16.875

Year	Competition Description	Location	Music	Apparatus	Score-Final	Score-Qualifying
2004	Olympics	Athens		All-around	103.800	102.750
2004	Olympics	Athens	Technologicque Park by Orbital	Ball	25.800	25.900
2004	Olympics	Athens	Spartacus Suite by Aram Khachaturian	Hoop	25.500	25.975
2004	Olympics	Athens	Tetsujin music from Matrix Revolutions by Juno Reactor & Don Davis	Clubs	26.375	26.075
2004	Olympics	Athens	Bumble Bee Boogie by Robert Wells	Ribbon	26.125	24.800
