= Anna Bessonova =

Ukrainian rhythmic gymnast (born 1984)

Anna Bezsonova
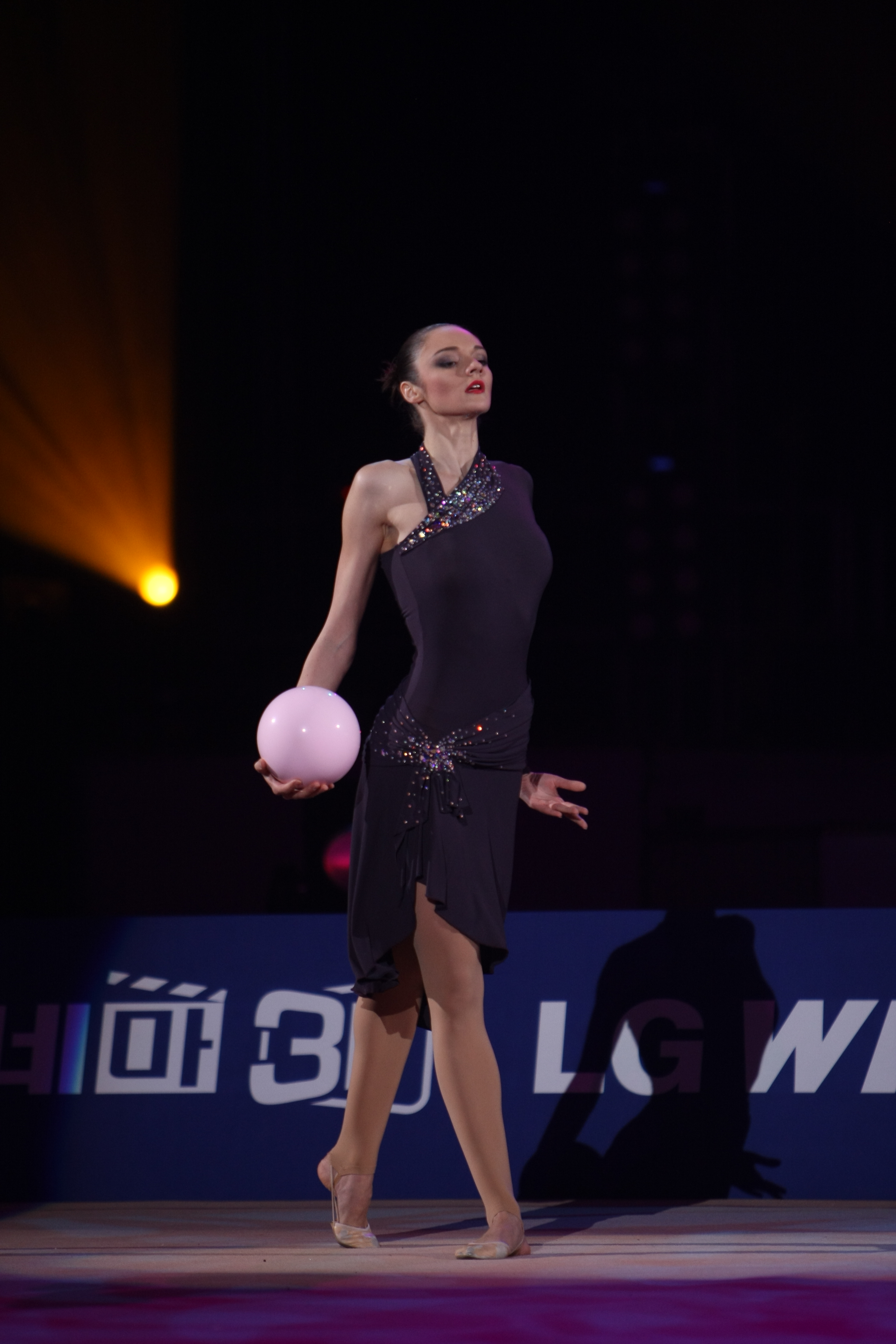
- Bessonova at the 2011 LG WHISEN Rhythmic All Stars Gala starting her ball routine.

Personal information
- Full name: Hanna Volodymyrivna Bessonova
- Nicknames: Anya, Bess
- Born: 29 July 1984 (age 42) Kyiv, Ukrainian SSR, Soviet Union
- Height: 174 cm (5 ft 9 in)

Gymnastics career
- Discipline: Rhythmic gymnastics
- Country represented: Ukraine
- Club: Deriugins School
- Head coach: Albina Deriugina
- Assistant coach: Iryna Deriugina
- Choreographer: Iryna Grischenko
- Retired: 2010, after competing in the Deriugina Cup.
Medal record
International gymnastics competitions
Event	1st	2nd	3rd
Olympic Games	0	0	2
World Championships	5	15	7
European Championships	3	12	9
European Team Championships	0	2	0
World Cup Final	3	4	3
Grand Prix Final	5	7	6
World Games	1	4	1
Summer Universiade	10	8	1
World Youth Games	1	2	1
Goodwill Games	1	4	0
Total	29	58	30
Rhythmic gymnastics
Representing Ukraine
Olympic Games
Bronze medal – third place	2004 Athens	All-around
Bronze medal – third place	2008 Beijing	All-around
World Championships
Gold medal – first place	2001 Madrid	Team
Gold medal – first place	2002 New Orleans	5 ribbons
Gold medal – first place	2003 Budapest	Hoop
Gold medal – first place	2003 Budapest	Clubs
Gold medal – first place	2007 Patras	All-around
Silver medal – second place	2001 Madrid	Hoop
Silver medal – second place	2001 Madrid	Ball
Silver medal – second place	2003 Budapest	All-around
Silver medal – second place	2003 Budapest	Ball
Silver medal – second place	2003 Budapest	Ribbon
Silver medal – second place	2003 Budapest	Team
Silver medal – second place	2005 Baku	Team
Silver medal – second place	2005 Baku	All-around
Silver medal – second place	2005 Baku	Rope
Silver medal – second place	2005 Baku	Ball
Silver medal – second place	2005 Baku	Clubs
Silver medal – second place	2005 Baku	Ribbon
Silver medal – second place	2007 Patras	Clubs
Silver medal – second place	2007 Patras	Ribbon
Silver medal – second place	2009 Mie	Ribbon
Bronze medal – third place	1999 Osaka	Team
Bronze medal – third place	2001 Madrid	All-around
Bronze medal – third place	2001 Madrid	Rope
Bronze medal – third place	2007 Patras	Hoop
Bronze medal – third place	2009 Mie	All-around
Bronze medal – third place	2009 Mie	Rope
Bronze medal – third place	2009 Mie	Ball
European Championships
Gold medal – first place	2003 Riesa	Ribbon
Gold medal – first place	2003 Riesa	Hoop
Gold medal – first place	2003 Riesa	Clubs
Silver medal – second place	2002 Granada	Team
Silver medal – second place	2003 Riesa	Ball
Silver medal – second place	2004 Kyiv	All-around
Silver medal – second place	2004 Kyiv	Team
Silver medal – second place	2005 Moscow	Ball
Silver medal – second place	2005 Moscow	Ribbon
Silver medal – second place	2005 Moscow	Team
Silver medal – second place	2007 Baku	Hoop
Silver medal – second place	2007 Baku	Ribbon
Silver medal – second place	2007 Baku	Team
Silver medal – second place	2008 Torino	All-around
Silver medal – second place	2009 Baku	Ball
Bronze medal – third place	2002 Granada	All-around
Bronze medal – third place	2005 Moscow	Rope
Bronze medal – third place	2005 Moscow	Clubs
Bronze medal – third place	2006 Moscow	All-around
Bronze medal – third place	2007 Baku	Clubs
Bronze medal – third place	2009 Baku	Rope
Bronze medal – third place	2009 Baku	Hoop
Bronze medal – third place	2009 Baku	Ribbon
Bronze medal – third place	2009 Baku	Team
European Team Championships
Silver medal – second place	2001 Riesa	Team
Silver medal – second place	2003 Moscow	Team
World Cup Final
Gold medal – first place	2002 Stuttgart	Rope
Gold medal – first place	2002 Stuttgart	Hoop
Gold medal – first place	2002 Stuttgart	Clubs
Silver medal – second place	2002 Stuttgart	Ball
Silver medal – second place	2008 Benidorm	Hoop
Silver medal – second place	2008 Benidorm	Clubs
Silver medal – second place	2008 Benidorm	Ribbon
Bronze medal – third place	2006 Mie	Rope
Bronze medal – third place	2006 Mie	Ball
Bronze medal – third place	2006 Mie	Ribbon
Grand Prix Final
Gold medal – first place	2003 Innsbruck	All-around
Gold medal – first place	2003 Innsbruck	Ribbon
Gold medal – first place	2003 Innsbruck	Hoop
Gold medal – first place	2004 Deventer	Hoop
Gold medal – first place	2004 Deventer	Clubs
Silver medal – second place	2002 Innsbruck	All-around
Silver medal – second place	2002 Innsbruck	Ball
Silver medal – second place	2003 Innsbruck	Clubs
Silver medal – second place	2003 Innsbruck	Ball
Silver medal – second place	2004 Deventer	Ribbon
Silver medal – second place	2005 Berlin	All-around
Silver medal – second place	2006 Berlin	Ball
Bronze medal – third place	2000 Deventer	Hoop
Bronze medal – third place	2002 Innsbruck	Clubs
Bronze medal – third place	2002 Innsbruck	Hoop
Bronze medal – third place	2004 Deventer	All-around
Bronze medal – third place	2004 Deventer	Ball
Bronze medal – third place	2005 Berlin	Ribbon
World Games
Gold medal – first place	2005 Duisburg	Rope
Silver medal – second place	2005 Duisburg	Ball
Silver medal – second place	2009 Kaohsiung	Rope
Silver medal – second place	2009 Kaohsiung	Ball
Silver medal – second place	2009 Kaohsiung	Ribbon
Bronze medal – third place	2005 Duisburg	Ribbon
Summer Universiade
Gold medal – first place	2003 Daegu	Ribbon
Gold medal – first place	2005 İzmir	All-around
Gold medal – first place	2005 İzmir	Rope
Gold medal – first place	2005 İzmir	Ball
Gold medal – first place	2005 İzmir	Clubs
Gold medal – first place	2007 Bangkok	All-around
Gold medal – first place	2007 Bangkok	Rope
Gold medal – first place	2007 Bangkok	Hoop
Gold medal – first place	2007 Bangkok	Clubs
Gold medal – first place	2007 Bangkok	Ribbon
Silver medal – second place	2003 Daegu	All-around
Silver medal – second place	2003 Daegu	Hoop
Silver medal – second place	2003 Daegu	Ball
Silver medal – second place	2003 Daegu	Clubs
Silver medal – second place	2009 Belgrade	All-around
Silver medal – second place	2009 Belgrade	Rope
Silver medal – second place	2009 Belgrade	Ball
Silver medal – second place	2009 Belgrade	Ribbon
Bronze medal – third place	2005 İzmir	Ribbon
World Youth Games (juniors)
Gold medal – first place	1998 Moscow	Ribbon
Silver medal – second place	1998 Moscow	Hoop
Silver medal – second place	1998 Moscow	Ball
Bronze medal – third place	1998 Moscow	Rope
Goodwill Games
Gold medal – first place	2001 Brisbane	Clubs
Silver medal – second place	2001 Brisbane	All-around
Silver medal – second place	2001 Brisbane	Rope
Silver medal – second place	2001 Brisbane	Hoop
Silver medal – second place	2001 Brisbane	Ball
Event	1st	2nd	3rd
Grand Prix	47	51	53
World Cup Series	28	32	19
Total	75	83	72
- Awards: Longines Prize for Elegance (2007, 2009)

Hanna Volodymyrivna Bezsonova (Ukrainian: Ганна Володимирівна Безсонова/Hanna Volodymyrivna Bezsonova; born 29 July 1984) is a Ukrainian former individual rhythmic gymnast. She's one of the most decorated rhythmic gymnast of her generation. Bessonova is a two-time Olympic bronze medalist (2004 in Athens and 2008 in Beijing); a five-time medalist in the all-around competition of the World Championships: gold in 2007, silver in 2003 and 2005, bronze in 2001 and 2009; a four-time medalist in the all-around competition of the European Championships: silver in 2004 and 2008, bronze in 2002 and 2006; and a four-time medalist in the all-around competition of the Grand Prix Final: gold in 2003, silver in 2002 and 2005, bronze in 2004.

== Personal life ==
Bessonova's father is the Dynamo Kyiv football player Vladimir Bessonov. Her mother, Viktoria, is a former two-time World champion group rhythmic gymnast. She is the one that introduced her daughter to the sport.

After retiring, Bessonova coached girls at the Deriugins School. Her students include Yeva Meleshchuk.

Bessonova moved to the United States in 2017 and coaches girls in Florida.

== Career ==
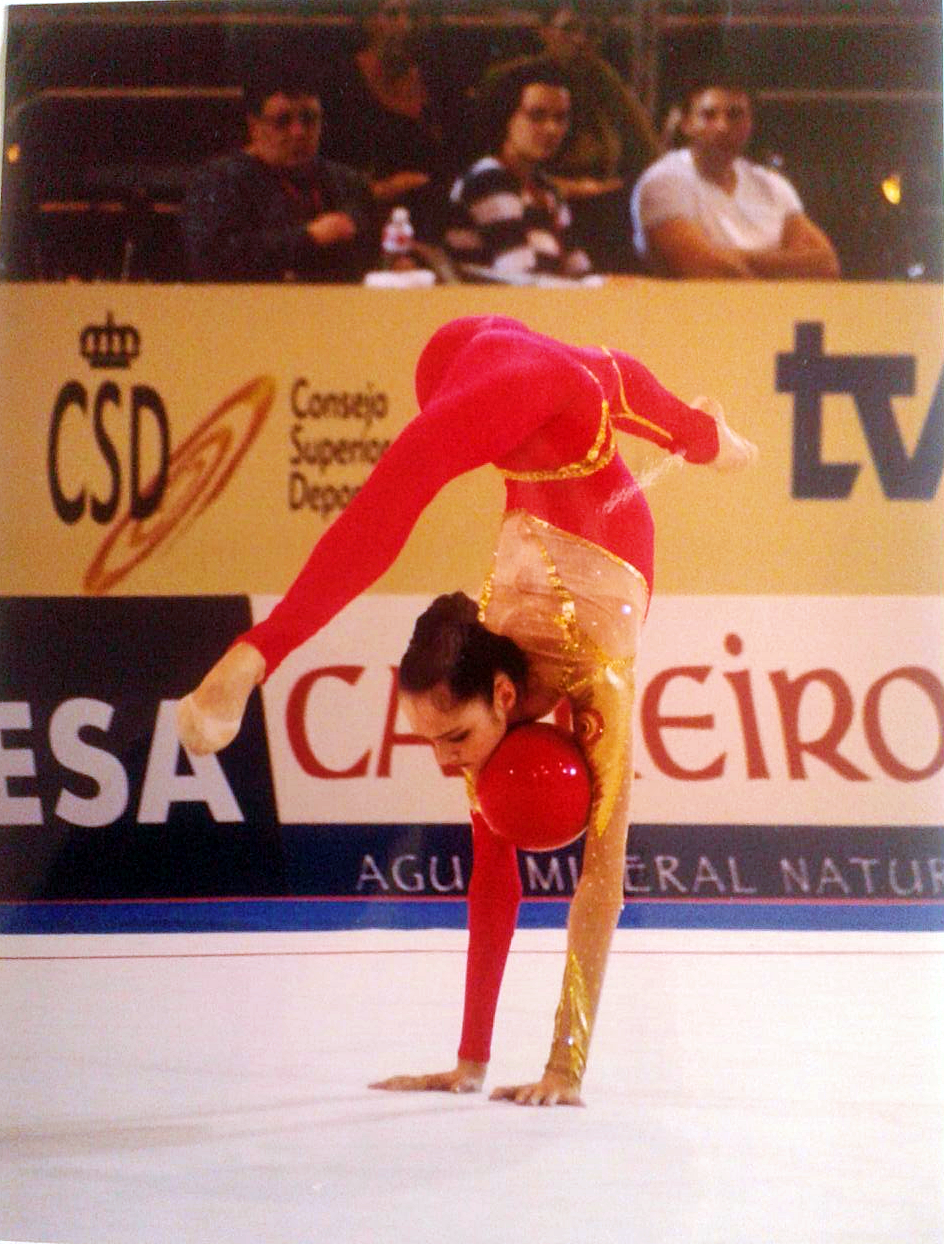
Bessonova at the 2001 World Championships

Bessonova began training in rhythmic gymnastics at age five. Her mother preferred to see her daughter on the ballet stage; however, Bessonova decided on rhythmic gymnastics. She was coached by Albina Deriugina and her daughter Irina Deriugina at the Deriugins School in Kyiv. She is 1.74 m (5 ft 9 in).

In 1998, Bessonova participated at the 1998 World Youth Games in Moscow and won a gold medal in ribbon, silver medals in ball and hoop and a bronze in rope in junior competition.

In 1999, Bessonova was the youngest in the Ukrainian team during the 1999 World Championship in Osaka, Japan, yet she made such a good impression that the RG specialists wrote her name immediately as a future top gymnast. In the 2001 World Championships, Alina Kabaeva and her teammate Irina Tchachina who originally won gold and silver medal in all-around respectively tested positive to a banned diuretic (furosemide) and were stripped of their medals. Ukraine's Tamara Yerofeeva who originally won bronze was awarded the gold with Bulgaria's Simona Peycheva from 4th to taking the silver and Bessonova from 5th was awarded the bronze medal.

In 2001, Bessonova participated at the 2001 Goodwill Games in Brisbane and won a bronze medal in clubs.

In 2002, Bessonova tested positive for norephedrine, a banned stimulant in March during a competition in Disneyland Paris Stadium by France and was banned for two months. Bessonova briefly competed as member of the Ukrainian Group. She and the Ukrainian Group won the gold medal in five Ribbons in New Orleans. She dominated the 2002 World Cup Final in Stuttgart in November, by winning the first place on the hoop, the rope and the clubs. After that Bessonova (aged 18) became a leader of the Ukrainian national team.

In 2003 in Budapest she won two World titles — the hoop event final edging out Alina Kabaeva (performing to music from Swan Lake) and the clubs final where she beat Irina Tchachina for the gold. Bessonova was very close to the all-around title but finished with the silver medal behind Russia's Alina Kabaeva after a drop during her ball routine. In 2003, she won three European gold medals — in hoop, clubs and ribbon event finals. She won three of four finals in the 2003 Grand Prix tournament in Kyiv.

In 2004, Bessonova won the all-around silver medal at the 2004 European Championships. She made her Olympic debut and won the bronze individual all-around medals at the 2004 Athens Olympics with a total score of 106.700 (ribbon 26.725, clubs 26.950, ball 26.525, hoop 26.500) behind two Russians, silver medalist Irina Tchachina and gold medalist Alina Kabaeva.

In 2005, Bessonova became a six-time silver medalist during 2005 World Championships in all-around, rope, ball, clubs and ribbon finals. She took four gold medals at the 2005 Universiade in İzmir, winning the all-around, rope, ball and clubs. She won the all-around bronze at the 2006 European Championships.

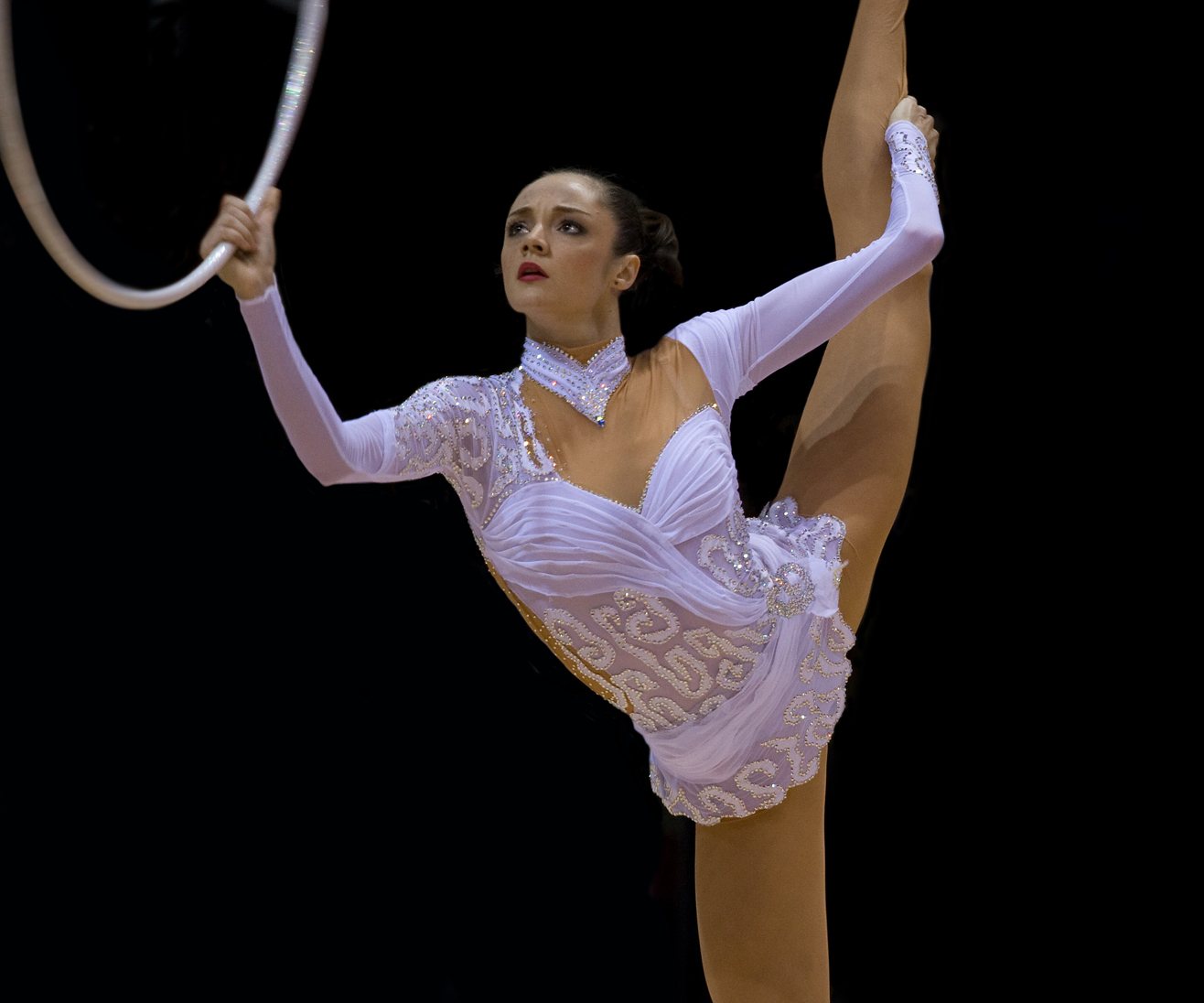
Bessonova at the 2008 World Cup Final

In 2007, Bessonova competed in a number of Grand Prix and World Cup Series. The year would also mark the start of a new challenge for Bessonova with rise of new Russian gymnast Evgenia Kanaeva. At the 2007 Corbeil-Essonnes World Cup, she won the silver medal behind Evgenia Kanaeva. She won all the gold medals in 2007 Summer Universiade beating Sessina and Kapranova. She became World champion at the 2007 World Championship in Patras, winning the all-around gold medal defeating Russians Vera Sessina and Olga Kapranova.

In 2008, Bessonova won all-around golds at the LA Lights, Deriugina Cup (Kyiv World Cup) and Miss Valentine Competitions, as well as the all-around silver at the European Championships in Torino behind Russian star Evgenia Kanaeva. At the 2008 World Cup events, Bessonova accumulated 15 medals. The year culminated in her all-around bronze medal at the 2008 Beijing Olympics with Kanaeva winning the gold medal and Belarus' Inna Zhukova taking the silver medal.

In 2009, Bessonova placed first in the all-around at the Kyiv World Cup and Deriugina Cup events, and also won bronze in the World and European Championships behind reigning Olympic champion Evgenia Kanaeva and Daria Kondakova. She competed at the 2009 Universiade in Belgrade and won four silver medals again behind Kanaeva. Bessonova finally completed her career in 2010 at the Deriugina Cup in Kyiv.

In 2013, Bessonova performed at the opening ceremony of the 2013 World Championships, in Kyiv, Ukraine.

== Other professional and social activities ==
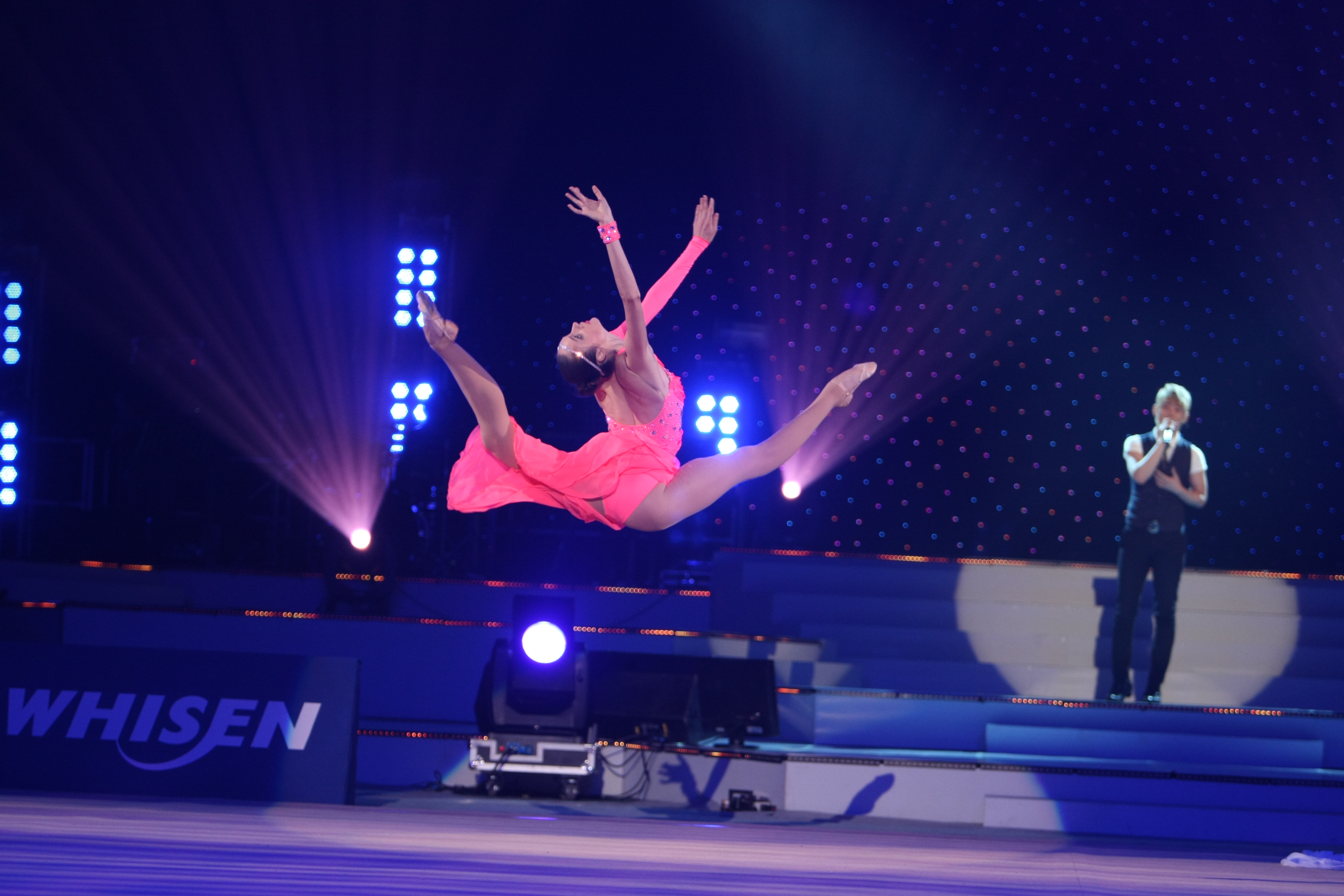
Bessonova at the 2011 LG WHISEN Rhythmic All Stars Gala doing a Leap in her Freehand routine.

After completing her career in professional sports, Bessonova appeared in Ukrainian television projects. During the UEFA Euro 2012, she was a TV presenter, a commentator and a special correspondent in a Ukrainian sports TV channel. Back in 2009, Bessonova took part in «Dancing for You» TV show, becoming the winner (partnered with Olexander Leshchenko). After some time, she was a chief editor of Ukrainian edition of the magazine Pink. Bessonova is also known as an active promoter of sports and healthy lifestyle among young people in Ukraine.

== Routine music information ==
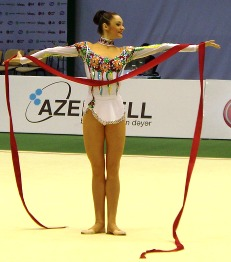
Bessonova at the 2009 European Championships

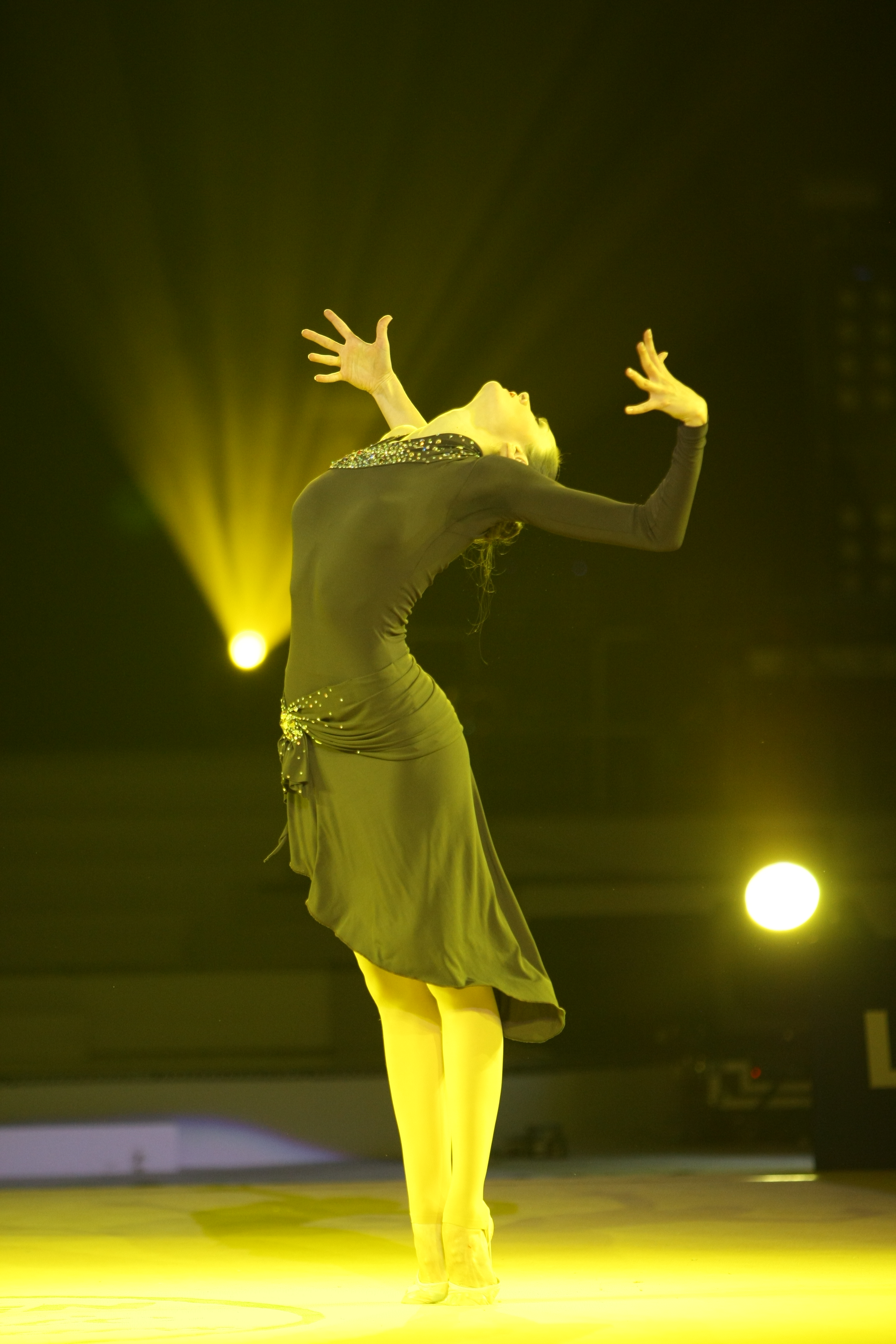
Bessonova at the 2011 LG WHISEN Rhythmic All Stars Gala

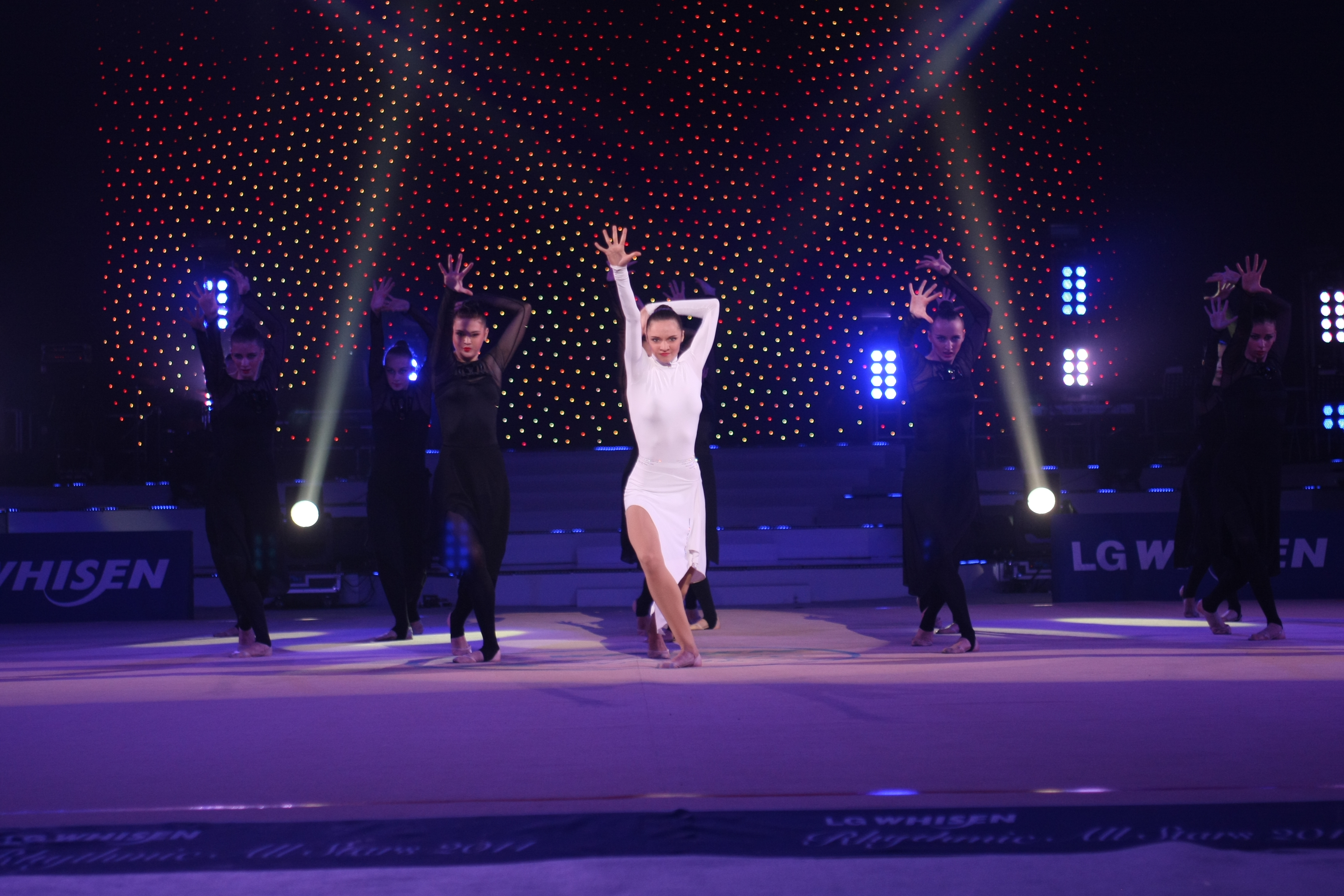
Bessonova at the 2011 LG WHISEN Rhythmic All Stars Gala

Year	Apparatus	Music title
2009	Hoop	Carrots/Shots / Struggle For Ebullience / Night Running / Earth Zoom In / Linda Looks For Love (Part 1) / Plan B music from Burn After Reading by Carter Burwell
2009	Rope	Boat Chase / Chopper Chase / Face Off music from The Italian Job by John Powell
2009	Ball	Chapel / Filet / Red Men music from Le Rêve by Benoît Jutras
2009	Ribbon	Carmina Burana by Carl Orff
2008	Hoop	music from Avrora by Valeri Tishler
2008	Rope	Shiro's Estate by Brian Tyler
2008	Clubs	Gladiator soundtrack – "Barbarian Horde"
2008	Ribbon	Hopak (Ukrainian Folk)
2007	Hoop	music from Avrora by Valeri Tishler
2007	Rope	The Dance At The Gym music from West Side Story by Leonard Bernstein
2007	Clubs	Gladiator soundtrack – "Barbarian Horde"
2007	Ribbon	Boléro by Maurice Ravel
2006	Ball	You Have A Special Purpose In Life / I'm Not Ready To Die / Renovatio music from The Island by Steve Jablonsky
2006	Rope	Conga Fury music from The Animatrix by Juno Reactor
2006	Clubs	Plaza of Execution / Leave No Witnesses / The Ride / The Fencing Lesson / The Mask of Zorro music from The Mask of Zorro by James Horner
2006	Ribbon	Molto Meno Mosso (Act IV, no.28) / Moderato (Act III, no. 24) music from Swan Lake by Pyotr Tchaikovsky
2005	Ball	Miss San / Miko's Testimony / Song to Miko music from Wasabi by Éric Serra
2005	Rope	Finale from Carmen by G. Bizet, R. Shchedrin
2005	Clubs	Jesus Arrested / Mary Goes to Jesus / Jesus is Carried Down music from The Passion of the Christ by John Debney
2005	Ribbon	Fantasy – overture for orchestra in B minor from Romeo and Juliet by Pyotr Tchaikovsky
2004	Hoop	Molto Meno Mosso / Allegro – Valse – Allegro – Vivo / Finale – Andante – Allegro Agitatoo - Alla Breve – Moderato e Maestoso – Moderato / Moderato by Tchaikovsky
2004	Ball	Spartacus by Aram Khachaturian
2004	Clubs	Mona Lisa Overdrive from The Matrix Reloaded by Don Davis and Juno Reactor
2004	Ribbon	Nyah / La Cavalera from Mission Impossible II by Hans Zimmer and Elliot Goldenthal
2003	Hoop	Molto Meno Mosso / Allegro – Valse – Allegro – Vivo / Finale – Andante – Allegro Agitatoo - Alla Breve – Moderato e Maestoso – Moderato / Moderato by Tchaikovsky
2003	Ball	Tennessee / Attack (from Pearl Harbor) by Hans Zimmer
2003	Clubs	Su-Chow Prison (from Spy Game by Harry Gregson-Williams
2003	Ribbon	Nyah / La Cavalera from Mission Impossible II by Hans Zimmer and Elliot Goldenthal
2002	Hoop	Molto Meno Mosso / Allegro – Valse – Allegro – Vivo / Finale – Andante – Allegro Agitatoo - Alla Breve – Moderato e Maestoso – Moderato / Moderato by Tchaikovsky
2002	Rope	Nyah music from Mission Impossible 2 by Hans Zimmer
2002	Clubs	The Word [PMT Remix] music from Swordfish by Dope Smugglaz
2002	Ball	Tennessee / Attack (from Pearl Harbor) by Hans Zimmer
2001	Hoop	Raid on Leonesse music from First Knight by Jerry Goldsmith
2001	Rope	Nyah music from Mission Impossible II by Hans Zimmer
2001	Clubs	Concierto Para Quinteto by Astor Piazzolla
2001	Ball	Barbarian Horde / To Zucchabar (from The Gladiator) by Hans Zimmer
2000	Hoop	Act 1 and 2 (from Giselle) by Adolphe Adam
2000	Rope	Night Borders / Camel Race / Main Theme music from The Mummy by Jerry Goldsmith
2000	Ball	Toccata and Fugue in D Minor by Johann Sebastian Bach
2000	Ribbon	"Serpent Dream" by Mike Oldfield
1999	Hoop	Nuestro Poema by Raul di Blasio
1999	Rope	Felicia music from Tango Forever by Luis Bravo
1999	Ball	?
1999	Ribbon	"Serpent Dream" by Mike Oldfield
1998	Hoop	?
1998	Clubs	?
1998	Ball	"Gory, gory, moya zvezda" (Ukrainian traditional)
1998	Ribbon	Private Investigations by Dire Straits

== Competitive highlights ==
Year	Event	Team	AA	Hoop	Ball	Clubs	Ribb.
International
1997	Aeon Cup	2nd	2nd J				
1998	Aeon Cup	3rd	3rd J				

== Detailed Olympic results ==
Year	Competition Description	Location	Music	Apparatus	Score-Final	Score-Qualifying
2008	Olympics	Beijing		All-around	71.875	72.825
2008	Olympics	Beijing	Hopak (Ukrainian Folk)	Ribbon	18.225	18.325
2008	Olympics	Beijing	Shiro's Estate by Brian Tyler	Rope	17.975	17.950
2008	Olympics	Beijing	Avrora by Valeri Tishler	Hoop	17.775	18.450
2008	Olympics	Beijing	Gladiator Soundtrack – Barbarian Horde	Clubs	17.900	18.100

Year	Competition Description	Location	Music	Apparatus	Score-Final	Score-Qualifying
2004	Olympics	Athens		All-around	106.700	104.725
2004	Olympics	Athens	Nyah / La Cavalera from Mission Impossible II by Hans Zimmer and Elliot Goldenthal	Ribbon	26.725	25.325
2004	Olympics	Athens	Spartacus by Aram Khachaturian	Ball	26.525	26.750
2004	Olympics	Athens	Molto Meno Mosso / Allegro – Valse – Allegro – Vivo / Finale – Andante – Allegro Agitatoo - Alla Breve – Moderato e Maestoso – Moderato / Moderato by Tchaikovsky	Hoop	26.500	25.900
2004	Olympics	Athens	Mona Lisa Overdrive from Matrix Reloaded by Don Davis & Juno Reactor	Clubs	26.950	26.750

== Literature ==
Bessonova's early years are described in the book National Olympic Committee of Ukraine for Rhythmic Gymnastics and Iryna Deriugina, Olexandra Tymoshenko, Olena Vitrychenko, Kateryna Serebryanska, Anna Bessonova (in Ukrainian) (Національний олімпійський комітет України про художню гімнастику та Ірину Дерюгіну, Олександру Тимошенко, Олену Вітриченко, Катерину Серебрянську, Анну Безсонову / текст: Григорія Палія та Олександра Мащенка; відповідальний редактор Олена Мовчан. — Київ : Грані-Т, 2010. — 112 с. — ISBN 978-966-465-283-1).

Another story based on real events from Anna Bessonova's childhood is Absolute champion by Oles Ilchenko (in Ukrainian) (Ільченко, О. Абсолютний чемпіон / Олесь Ільченко. — Київ : Грані-Т, 2011. — 80 с. — ISBN 978-966-465-349-4).
