= Olga Kapranova =

Russian rhythmic gymnast (born 1987)

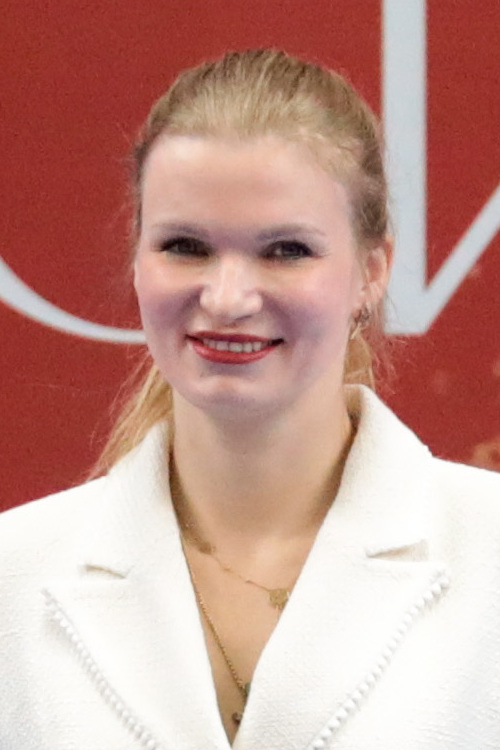
- Kapranova in 2023

Personal information
- Full name: Ольга Серге́евна Капра́нова; Olga Sergeyevna Kapranova
- Born: December 6, 1987 (age 38) Moscow, Russia SFSR
- Height: 177 cm (5 ft 10 in)

Gymnastics career
- Discipline: Rhythmic gymnastics
- Country represented: Russia
- Club: Gazprom
- Head coach: Irina Viner
- Assistant coach: Vera Shatalina
- Former coach: Elena Nefedova
- Choreographer: Veronica Shatkova
- Retired: 2009
Medal record
Rhythmic Gymnastics
Representing Russia
World Championships
Gold medal – first place	2003 Budapest	Team
Gold medal – first place	2005 Baku	All-around
Gold medal – first place	2005 Baku	Rope
Gold medal – first place	2005 Baku	Ball
Gold medal – first place	2005 Baku	Clubs
Gold medal – first place	2005 Baku	Team
Gold medal – first place	2007 Patras	Team
Gold medal – first place	2007 Patras	Hoop
Gold medal – first place	2007 Patras	Clubs
Gold medal – first place	2009 Mie	Team
Silver medal – second place	2007 Patras	Rope
Bronze medal – third place	2007 Patras	All-around
European Championships
Gold medal – first place	2005 Moscow	Ball
Gold medal – first place	2005 Moscow	Team
Gold medal – first place	2007 Baku	Hoop
Gold medal – first place	2007 Baku	Team
Gold medal – first place	2009 Baku	Team
Silver medal – second place	2005 Moscow	Rope
Silver medal – second place	2005 Moscow	Clubs
Silver medal – second place	2007 Baku	Clubs
Bronze medal – third place	2007 Baku	Rope
Bronze medal – third place	2008 Torino	All-around
World Cup Final
Silver medal – second place	2006 Mie	Clubs
Silver medal – second place	2008 Benidorm	Rope
Bronze medal – third place	2004 Moscow	Hoop
Bronze medal – third place	2004 Moscow	Clubs
Bronze medal – third place	2004 Moscow	Ribbon
Bronze medal – third place	2008 Benidorm	Clubs
Grand Prix Final
Gold medal – first place	2005 Berlin	Rope
Gold medal – first place	2005 Berlin	Ball
Gold medal – first place	2005 Berlin	Clubs
Gold medal – first place	2007 Innsbruck	All-around
Gold medal – first place	2007 Innsbruck	Hoop
Gold medal – first place	2007 Innsbruck	Clubs
Gold medal – first place	2008 Bratislava	All-around
Gold medal – first place	2008 Bratislava	Rope
Gold medal – first place	2008 Bratislava	Clubs
Gold medal – first place	2008 Bratislava	Ribbon
Silver medal – second place	2004 Deventer	All-around
Silver medal – second place	2006 Berlin	All-around
Silver medal – second place	2007 Innsbruck	Ribbon
Silver medal – second place	2007 Innsbruck	Rope
Silver medal – second place	2008 Bratislava	Hoop
Bronze medal – third place	2004 Deventer	Ribbon
Bronze medal – third place	2004 Deventer	Hoop
Bronze medal – third place	2005 Berlin	All-around
Bronze medal – third place	2006 Berlin	Rope
World Games
Gold medal – first place	2005 Duisburg	Ball
Gold medal – first place	2005 Duisburg	Clubs
Silver medal – second place	2009 Kaohsiung	Hoop
Bronze medal – third place	2009 Kaohsiung	Rope
Summer Universiade
Silver medal – second place	2007 Bangkok	All-around
Silver medal – second place	2007 Bangkok	Ribbon
Silver medal – second place	2007 Bangkok	Hoop

Olga Sergeyevna Kapranova (Russian: Ольга Серге́евна Капра́нова; born 6 December 1987) is a Russian retired individual rhythmic gymnast. She is the 2005 World all-around champion, the 2007 World all-around bronze medalist, the 2008 European all-around bronze medalist, a two-time (2007, 2008) Grand Prix Final all-around champion, a two-time (2004, 2006) Grand Prix Final all-around silver medalist and the 2005 Grand Prix Final all-around bronze medalist.

In the fall of 2024, the various Russian gymnastics federations were restructured into one Russian Rhythmic Gymnastics Federation for all disciplines, and Kapranova became the representative for rhythmic gymnastics.

== Career ==
Kapranova was born on 6th of December 1987 in Moscow, Soviet Union. She first took up the sport of rhythmic gymnastics in 1993 and trained with Elena Nefedova. In 2002, she started to train with Irina Viner, who has coached other stars of the sport, including Yana Batyrshina and Alina Kabaeva.

Kapranova began competing internationally in 2003. She finished fourth in the all-around at the World Cup in Zaragoza and won a team medal at the World Championships in Budapest.

In 2004, Kapranova did not make the Olympic team, with the two places going to Irina Tchachina and Alina Kabaeva. After their retirements, she became one of Russia's top gymnasts. In 2005, she won the individual all-around title at the World Rhythmic Gymnastics Championships held in Baku, Azerbaijan. Although she trailed the eventual silver and bronze medalists Anna Bessonova and Irina Tchachina going into the final exercise, ball, it was Kapranova's strongest event and her performance allowed her to take the lead. She won a total of five of the six available gold medals at the event.

In 2006, Kapranova won silver in all-around at the 2006 Grand Prix Final and another silver medal in clubs at the World Cup Final in Mie. She earned a number of medals in the World Cup series in 2007 and 2008, won the Grand Prix Final in 2007 and 2008, and took the bronze medal in the all-around at the 2007 World Championships behind teammate Vera Sessina. At the 2007 Summer Universiade, she won the silver medal in the all-around behind Anna Bessonova.

In the 2008 Olympic season, Kapranova won the bronze medal in the all-around at the 2008 European Championships behind silver medalist Anna Bessonova and with rising star teammate Evgenia Kanaeva taking the gold medal. She was selected to compete in the 2008 Summer Olympics after beating Vera Sessina to take the second spot in the Russian team, along with Evgenia Kanaeva. She was ranked second in the qualifications and finished fourth in the women's individual event finals.

Although she initially wanted to retire after the Olympics, Viner encouraged her to compete for another year due to her disappointing fourth-place finish. She competed at the 2009 World Championships in Mie, Japan and won the team gold medal with Evgenia Kanaeva, Daria Kondakova and Daria Dmitrieva. At the end of the 2009 season, she retired from competition and began coaching children.

== Personal life ==
Kapranova has an elder sister, Ekaterina, who is also a former rhythmic gymnast. She also trained Kristina Pimenova, who trained as a rhythmic gymnast before retiring to pursue a career as a model.

== Routine music information ==
Year	Apparatus	Music title
2009	Hoop	Slovanic March op.31 by Tchaikovsky
2009	Ball	Caruso from Voice by Neal Schon
2009	Rope	Act 1 – Appearance Of Kitri / Act 1 – Variation: Kitri from Don Quixote by Leon Minkus
2009	Ribbon	Mozart 40# in dream-mystery by Angelika / Mozart
2008	Hoop	Act 1 – Kitri and Basilio, Variation: Kitri music from Don Quixote by Leon Minkus
2008	Rope	Pogonya
2008	Clubs	Introduction: Moderato Assai – Allegro Ma Non Troppo from Swan Lake by Tchaikovsky
2008	Ribbon	Katyusha Remix by DJ Ras Putin
2007	Hoop	Turandot music from Nessun Dorma Giacomo Puccini
2007	Rope	La Habanera music from One Second by Yello
2007	Clubs	Act 1 no. 8 Pas d'action music from The Sleeping Beauty by Tchaikovsky
2007	Ribbon	Barynya (Landlady) – (Russian Traditional)
2006	Rope	Tango Ballet For Violin And String Orchestra: Titulos / La Calle by Astor Piazzolla
2006	Ball	?
2006	Clubs	Karapet Dance / Kalinka (Russian & Ukrainian Traditionals)
2006	Ribbon	Ouverture music from La Gazza Ladra by Rossini
2005	Rope	Boublitchski (Russian traditional song)
2005	Ball	Intrada music from The Nutcracker by Pyotr Tchaikovsky
2005	Clubs	The Invitation To The Jellicle Ball; The Jellicle Ball; The Gumbie Cat from Cats by Andrew Lloyd Webber
2005	Ribbon	I: Tempo Di Valse Ma Non Troppo Vivo, Quasi Moderato & II. Andante; Allegro from Swan Lake by Tchaikovsky
2004	Hoop	"Don't Let Me Be Misunderstood" music from Kill Bill by Santa Esmeralda
2004	Ball	O Sole Mio by Eduardo di Capua
2004	Clubs	Mawoud (Club Mix) by Said Mrad
2004	Ribbon	Lament To Birch Bark from The Best Of Russian Folk Music by Moscow Balalaika Quartet
2003	Hoop	Introduction and Rondo Capriccioso, for violin & orchestra in A minor, Op. 28 by Camille Saint-Saëns
2003	Ball	Shurale by Firad Yarullin
2003	Clubs	Dancing with the Muse by Chris Spheeris
2003	Ribbon	Russian Dance (from Swan Lake) by Vanessa Mae
2002	Hoop	Terry's theme from Limelight by Charlie Chaplin
2002	Ball	?
2002	Clubs	Quixote by Bond
2002	Rope	Korobejniki from Kamarinskaya by Michael Glinka

== Detailed Olympic results ==
Year	Competition Description	Location	Music	Apparatus	Rank	Score-Final	Rank	Score-Qualifying
2008	Olympics	Beijing		All-around	4th	71.700	2nd	72.900
2008	Olympics	Beijing	Katyusha Remix by DJ Ras Putin	Ribbon	3rd	18.050	2nd	17.875
2008	Olympics	Beijing	Pogonya	Rope	2nd	18.200	1st	18.350
2008	Olympics	Beijing	Act 1 – Kitri and Basilio, Variation: Kitri music from Don Quixote by Leon Minkus	Hoop	2nd	18.500	2nd	18.475
2008	Olympics	Beijing	Swan Lake by Tchaikovsky	Clubs	8th	16.950	2nd	18.200
