= Vera Sessina =

Russian rhythmic gymnast (born 1986)

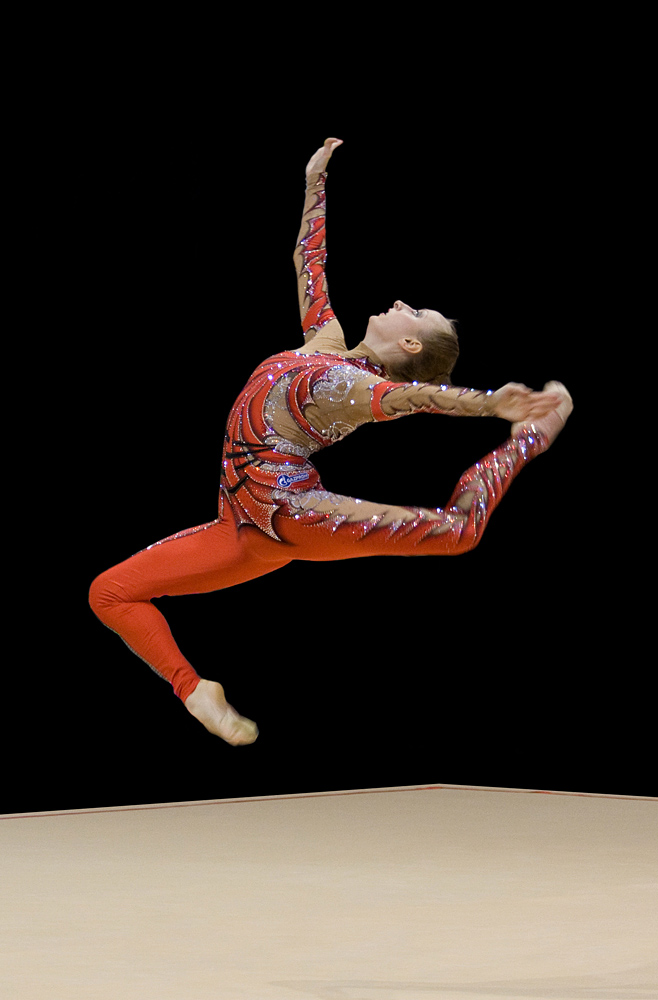

Personal information
- Full name: Vera Valeryevna Sessina
- Alternative name: Sesina
- Born: 23 February 1986 (age 40) Sverdlovsk, Russian SFSR, Soviet Union
- Height: 177 cm (5 ft 10 in)

Gymnastics career
- Discipline: Rhythmic gymnastics
- Country represented: Russia
- Club: MGFSO
- Head coach: Irina Viner
- Assistant coach: Natalia Gorbulina
- Choreographer: Veronica Shatkova
- Retired: 2009
Medal record
Rhythmic Gymnastics
Representing Russia
World Championships
Gold medal – first place	2003 Budapest	Team
Gold medal – first place	2005 Baku	Team
Gold medal – first place	2005 Baku	Ribbon
Gold medal – first place	2007 Patras	Team
Gold medal – first place	2007 Patras	Rope
Gold medal – first place	2007 Patras	Ribbon
Silver medal – second place	2007 Patras	All-around
Silver medal – second place	2007 Patras	Hoop
Bronze medal – third place	2007 Patras	Clubs
European Championships
Gold medal – first place	2002 Granada	Team
Gold medal – first place	2005 Moscow	Team
Gold medal – first place	2006 Moscow	All-around
Gold medal – first place	2007 Baku	Clubs
Gold medal – first place	2007 Baku	Team
Gold medal – first place	2009 Baku	Team
Silver medal – second place	2007 Baku	Rope
Silver medal – second place	2009 Baku	Rope
Silver medal – second place	2009 Baku	Hoop
Silver medal – second place	2009 Baku	Ribbon
Bronze medal – third place	2007 Baku	Hoop
Bronze medal – third place	2007 Baku	Ribbon
World Cup Final
Gold medal – first place	2006 Mie	Ball
Gold medal – first place	2006 Mie	Clubs
Gold medal – first place	2006 Mie	Ribbon
Gold medal – first place	2008 Benidorm	Rope
Silver medal – second place	2006 Mie	Rope
Bronze medal – third place	2002 Stuttgart	Rope
Bronze medal – third place	2008 Benidorm	Ribbon
Grand Prix Final
Gold medal – first place	2003 Innsbruck	Clubs
Gold medal – first place	2003 Innsbruck	Ball
Gold medal – first place	2005 Berlin	All-around
Gold medal – first place	2006 Berlin	All-around
Gold medal – first place	2006 Berlin	Rope
Gold medal – first place	2006 Berlin	Ball
Gold medal – first place	2006 Berlin	Clubs
Gold medal – first place	2006 Berlin	Ribbon
Gold medal – first place	2007 Innsbruck	Ribbon
Gold medal – first place	2007 Innsbruck	Rope
Gold medal – first place	2008 Bratislava	Hoop
Silver medal – second place	2003 Innsbruck	All-around
Silver medal – second place	2003 Innsbruck	Hoop
Silver medal – second place	2005 Berlin	Ball
Silver medal – second place	2005 Berlin	Clubs
Silver medal – second place	2005 Berlin	Ribbon
Silver medal – second place	2007 Innsbruck	All-around
Silver medal – second place	2007 Innsbruck	Hoop
Silver medal – second place	2007 Innsbruck	Clubs
Silver medal – second place	2008 Bratislava	All-around
Silver medal – second place	2008 Bratislava	Rope
Silver medal – second place	2008 Bratislava	Clubs
Silver medal – second place	2008 Bratislava	Ribbon
Bronze medal – third place	2003 Innsbruck	Ribbon
World Games
Gold medal – first place	2005 Duisburg	Ribbon
Silver medal – second place	2005 Duisburg	Rope
Bronze medal – third place	2005 Duisburg	Ball
Summer Universiade
Silver medal – second place	2007 Bangkok	Rope
Silver medal – second place	2007 Bangkok	Clubs
Bronze medal – third place	2007 Bangkok	All-around
Bronze medal – third place	2007 Bangkok	Ribbon

Vera Valeryevna Sessina (Russian: Вера Валерьевна Сесина, born 23 February 1986) is a Russian individual rhythmic gymnast. She is the 2007 World All-around silver medalist, the 2006 European All-around Champion, two time (2006, 2005) Grand Prix Final All-around champion and three time (2008, 2007, 2003) Grand Prix Final All-around silver medalist. She was known for her high releve during her pivot.

== Career ==
Sessina began training in rhythmic gymnastics in 1993 and eventually moved to the Russian training center in Novogorsk. At the 2002 European Championships in Granada, she performed only one routine, but was noticed because of her flexibility, stability and clean performance. The same year, she took part in an international event in Thiais (France) and won some medals on various apparatus. In 2003, she performed well on the Grand Prix circuit.

In 2005, Sessina competed at the 2005 World Championships. She placed fifth in all-around qualifications but did not advance into the finals because teammates Olga Kapranova and Irina Tchachina placed ahead of her. She was also sent to the 2005 European Championships.

In 2006, Sessina won the all-around competition at the 2006 European Championships in Moscow, beating teammate and Olympic champion Alina Kabaeva. She won the 2006 Grand Prix Final all-around in Innsbruck and won three events of the FIG World Cup Final in Mie, Japan.

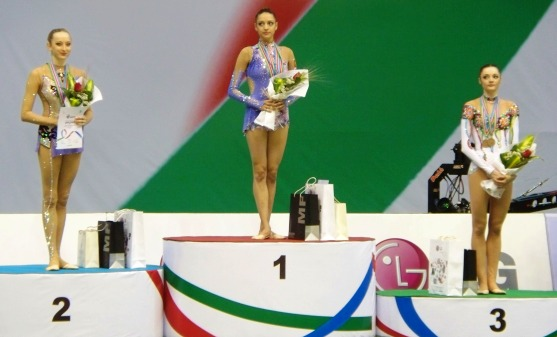
Sessina at the 2009 European Championships

Sessina continued to do well in 2007, winning the all-around silver medal at the World Cup series in Ljubljana as well as silver in all-around at the 2007 Grand Prix Final. At the 2007 European Championships in Baku, she won the gold medal in clubs, a silver for rope, a pair of bronze medals for ribbon and hoop for the individual event finals. At the 2007 World Championships, Sessina won the all-around silver medal behind Ukrainian Anna Bessonova and then took the all-around bronze medal at the 2007 Summer Universiade behind Bessonova and Kapranova.

Sessina competed for a spot at the 2008 Olympics but struggled due to injury and was beaten by compatriots Evgenia Kanaeva and Olga Kapranova. She won a gold medal in rope and bronze in hoop at the 2008 World Cup Final in Benidorm and ended her season with silver in the all-around at the 2008 Grand Prix Final.

Sessina won silver medals in All-around, rope, hoop and ribbon at the 2009 European Championships held in Baku, Azerbaijan. She retired from competition following the event.

After her retirement, Sessina was elected to the FIG Athletes Commission as a rhythmic gymnastics representative.

== Routine music information ==
Year	Apparatus	Music title
2009	Hoop	Theme from 'Pique Dame' by Tchaikovsky
2009	Ball	John Nineteen: Forty One/Superstar/Overture music from Jesus Christ Superstar by Andrew Lloyd Webber
2009	Rope	Back in the U.S.S.R.
2009	Ribbon	Yesterday music from Imagine by Ofra Harnoy
2008	Hoop	Concerto in F by Gershwin
2008	Rope	"Beetlejuice" Music For A Darkened Theatre Vol. 1 by Danny Elfman
2008	Clubs	The Firebird/ The Carnival of the Animals by Igor Stravinsky / Camille Saint-Saëns
2008	Ribbon	Cadenza / Rondo by Alfred Schnittke
2007	Hoop	Music from Chess by Björn Ulvaeus & Benny Andersson
2007	Rope	Russian Sailor Dance music from The Red Poppy by Reinhold Glière
2007	Clubs	The Firebird/ The Carnival of the Animals by Igor Stravinsky / Camille Saint-Saëns
2007	Ribbon	Fantasy for Violin & Orchestra music from Ladies in Lavender by Nigel Hess & Royal Philharmonic Orchestra
2006	Rope	Islamey (The Oriental Fantasy) by Mily Balakirev
2006	Ball	Leyanda by Isaac Manuel Francisco Albéniz
2006	Clubs	Aragon Hunt by Michael Ivanovich Glinka
2006	Ribbon	Requiem by Mozart
2005	Rope	Tango de los Exilados by Vanessa Mae
2005	Ball	Piano Concerto No.1 In B Flat Minor: 3rd Movement by Maksim Mvrica
2005	Clubs	Theme / The take over / Battle in the boneyard music from Con Air by Trevor Rabin, Mark Mancina
2005	Ribbon	Love Story by Arthur Fidler & Boston Pops Orchestra
2004	Hoop	Straight to Number One / Big Beat / Tango in Harlem by Touch 'n Go
2004	Ball	Piano Concerto No. 1, 3rd Movement by Tchaikovsky
2004	Clubs	Act 1 Scene 2 music from Pique Dame / Queen of Spades by Tchaikovsky
2004	Ribbon	?
2003	Hoop	Ninkou Latora music from Cirque du Soleil: Dralion by Violaine Corradi
2003	Ball	?
2003	Clubs	At the Circus / Adagio music from Spartacus by Aram Khatchaturian
2003	Ribbon	Theme music from Giselle by Charles Adam Adolphe
2002	Hoop	Would You... (Radio Edit) and (Long Dance Mix) by Touch and Go
2002	Ball	Scene d'amour by Sarah Brightman
2002	Clubs	Hey Pachuco! by Royal Crown Revue
2002	Rope	Introduction and Rondo Capriccioso, for violin & orchestra in A minor, Op. 28 by Camille Saint-Saëns
