= Rhythmic gymnastics at the 2001 World Games – Clubs =

Rhythmic gymnastics - clubs at the 2001 World Games
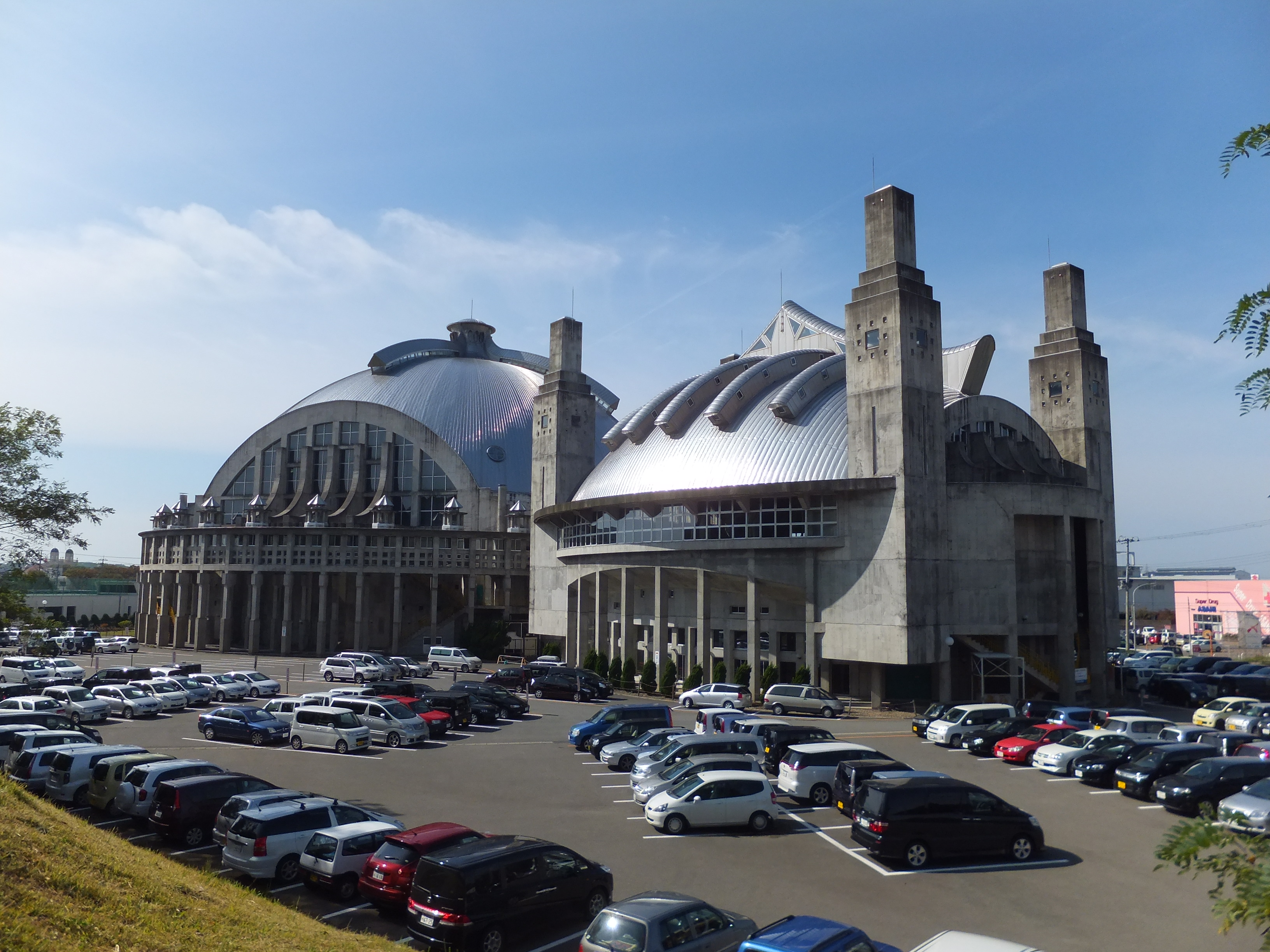
- Akita City Gymnasium
- Venue: Akita City Gymnasium
- Date: 22–23 August 2001
- Competitors: 24 from 16 nations
- Winning total: 28.575 points

Medalists
| 1st place, gold medalist(s) | | (Russia) Irina Tchachina |
| 2nd place, silver medalist(s) | | (Russia) Lyasan Utiasheva |
| 3rd place, bronze medalist(s) | | (Belarus) Elena Tkachenko |

The clubs event in rhythmic gymnastics at the 2001 World Games in Akita was played from 22 to 23 August. The competition took place at Akita City Gymnasium.

== Competition format ==
A total of 24 athletes entered the competition. The best eight athletes from preliminary round advances to the final.

== Results ==
=== Preliminary ===
| Rank | Athlete | Nation | Score | Note |
|---|---|---|---|---|
| 1 | Irina Tchachina | Russia | 28.325 | Q |
| 2 | Lyasan Utiasheva | Russia | 27.765 | Q |
| 3 | Elena Tkachenko | Belarus | 27.275 | Q |
| 4 | Jessica Howard | United States | 26.225 | Q |
| 5 | Almudena Cid Tostado | Spain | 26.000 | Q |
| 6 | Yukari Murata | Japan | 25.650 | Q |
| 7 | Esther Domínguez | Spain | 25.375 | Q |
| 8 | Cho Eun-jung | South Korea | 25.075 | Q |
| 9 | Mojca Rode | Slovenia | 25.025 | |
| 10 | Ai Yokochi | Japan | 25.025 | |
| 11 | Mary Sanders | Canada | 24.550 | |
| 12 | Catarina Borges | Portugal | 23.900 | |
| 13 | Katarína Beluginová | Slovakia | 23.550 | |
| 14 | Demetra Sergiou | Cyprus | 23.025 | |
| 15 | Son Eun-jung | South Korea | 23.000 | |
| 16 | Daniela Masseroni | Italy | 22.825 | |
| 17 | Liliana Teixeira | Portugal | 22.800 | |
| 18 | Irina Funtikova | Canada | 22.750 | |
| 19 | Olga Karmansky | United States | 22.750 | |
| 20 | Kate Riley | Australia | 22.650 | |
| 21 | Brigitta Haris | Hungary | 22.525 | |
| 22 | Sherin Taama | Egypt | 21.350 | |
| 23 | Laura Vernizzi | Italy | 20.950 | |
| 24 | Belinda Potgieter | South Africa | 19.475 | |

=== Final ===
| Rank | Athlete | Nation | Score |
|---|---|---|---|
| 1st place, gold medalist(s) | Irina Tchachina | Russia | 28.575 |
| 2nd place, silver medalist(s) | Lyasan Utiasheva | Russia | 27.425 |
| 3rd place, bronze medalist(s) | Elena Tkachenko | Belarus | 26.850 |
| 4 | Almudena Cid Tostado | Spain | 26.075 |
| 5 | Jessica Howard | United States | 25.550 |
| 6 | Yukari Murata | Japan | 24.650 |
| 7 | Esther Domínguez | Spain | 24.475 |
| 8 | Cho Eun-jung | South Korea | 23.750 |
