= Rhythmic gymnastics at the 2001 World Games – Rope =

Rhythmic gymnastics - rope at the 2001 World Games
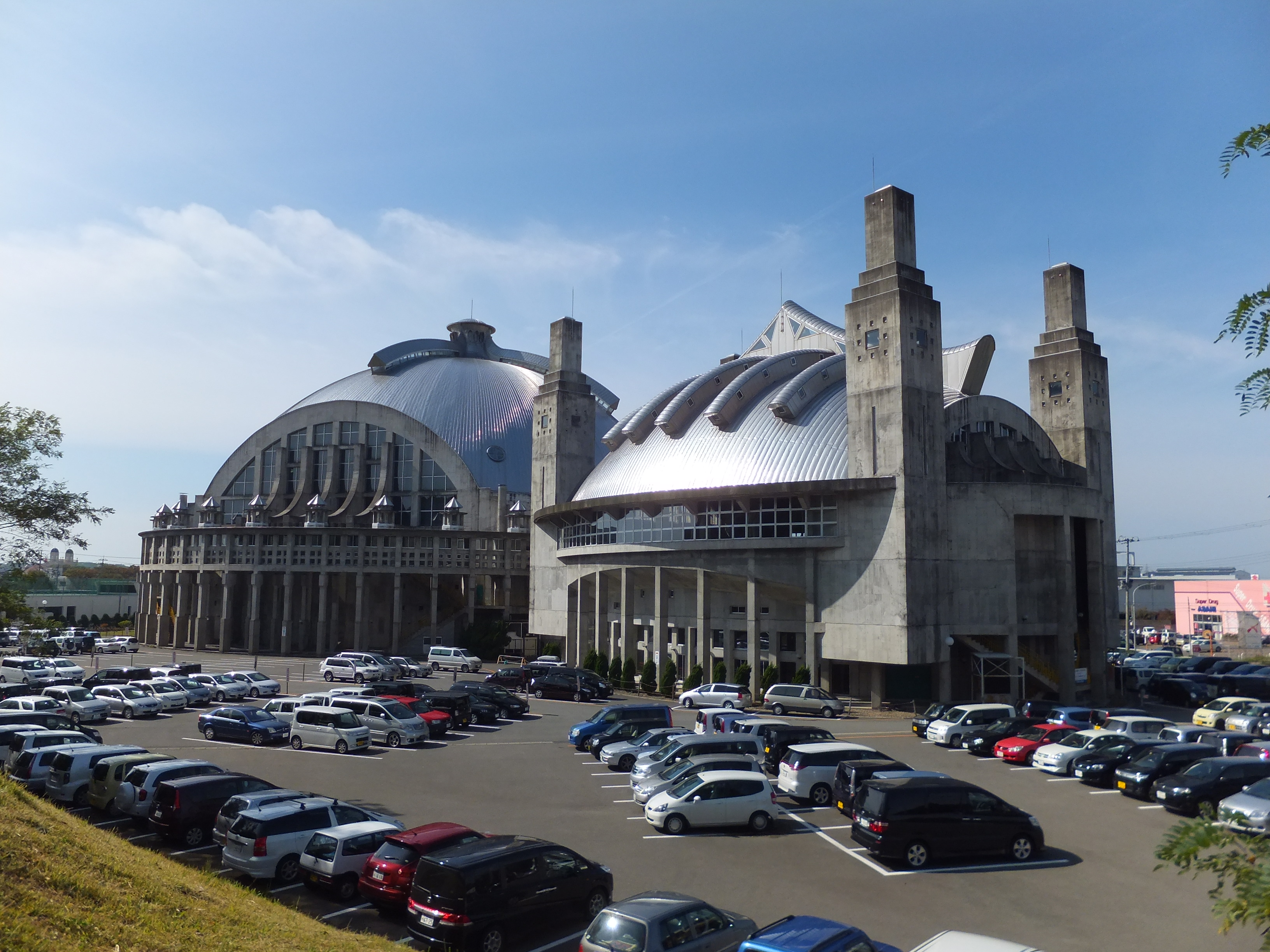
- Akita City Gymnasium
- Venue: Akita City Gymnasium
- Date: 22–23 August 2001
- Competitors: 24 from 16 nations
- Winning total: 29.050 points

Medalists
| 1st place, gold medalist(s) | | (Russia) Irina Tchachina |
| 2nd place, silver medalist(s) | | (Russia) Lyasan Utiasheva |
| 3rd place, bronze medalist(s) | | (Belarus) Elena Tkachenko |

The rope event in rhythmic gymnastics at the 2001 World Games in Akita was played from 22 to 23 August. The competition took place at Akita City Gymnasium.

== Competition format ==
A total of 24 athletes entered the competition. The best eight athletes from preliminary round advances to the final.

== Results ==
=== Preliminary ===
| Rank | Athlete | Nation | Score | Note |
|---|---|---|---|---|
| 1 | Irina Tchachina | Russia | 29.000 | Q |
| 2 | Lyasan Utiasheva | Russia | 27.600 | Q |
| 3 | Almudena Cid Tostado | Spain | 26.250 | Q |
| 4 | Elena Tkachenko | Belarus | 26.050 | Q |
| 5 | Esther Domínguez | Spain | 25.800 | Q |
| 6 | Ai Yokochi | Japan | 25.650 | Q |
| 7 | Brigitta Haris | Hungary | 25.650 | Q |
| 8 | Jessica Howard | United States | 25.550 | Q |
| 9 | Katarína Beluginová | Slovakia | 25.000 | |
| 10 | Mojca Rode | Slovenia | 25.000 | |
| 11 | Yukari Murata | Japan | 24.850 | |
| 12 | Olga Karmansky | United States | 24.750 | |
| 13 | Daniela Masseroni | Italy | 24.250 | |
| 14 | Demetra Sergiou | Cyprus | 24.150 | |
| 15 | Irina Funtikova | Canada | 24.050 | |
| 16 | Liliana Teixeira | Portugal | 23.750 | |
| 17 | Catarina Borges | Portugal | 23.725 | |
| 18 | Kate Riley | Australia | 23.100 | |
| 19 | Mary Sanders | Canada | 22.950 | |
| 20 | Son Eun-jung | South Korea | 22.450 | |
| 21 | Cho Eun-jung | South Korea | 22.200 | |
| 22 | Sherin Taama | Egypt | 22.150 | |
| 23 | Belinda Potgieter | South Africa | 21.925 | |
| 24 | Laura Vernizzi | Italy | 21.650 | |

=== Final ===
| Rank | Athlete | Nation | Score |
|---|---|---|---|
| 1st place, gold medalist(s) | Irina Tchachina | Russia | 29.050 |
| 2nd place, silver medalist(s) | Lyasan Utiasheva | Russia | 28.500 |
| 3rd place, bronze medalist(s) | Elena Tkachenko | Belarus | 27.000 |
| 4 | Almudena Cid Tostado | Spain | 26.050 |
| 5 | Esther Domínguez | Spain | 25.775 |
| 6 | Ai Yokochi | Japan | 25.550 |
| 7 | Jessica Howard | United States | 25.350 |
| 8 | Brigitta Haris | Hungary | 24.450 |
