= Rhythmic gymnastics at the 2001 World Games – Ball =

August 2001 competition

Rhythmic gymnastics - ball at the 2001 World Games
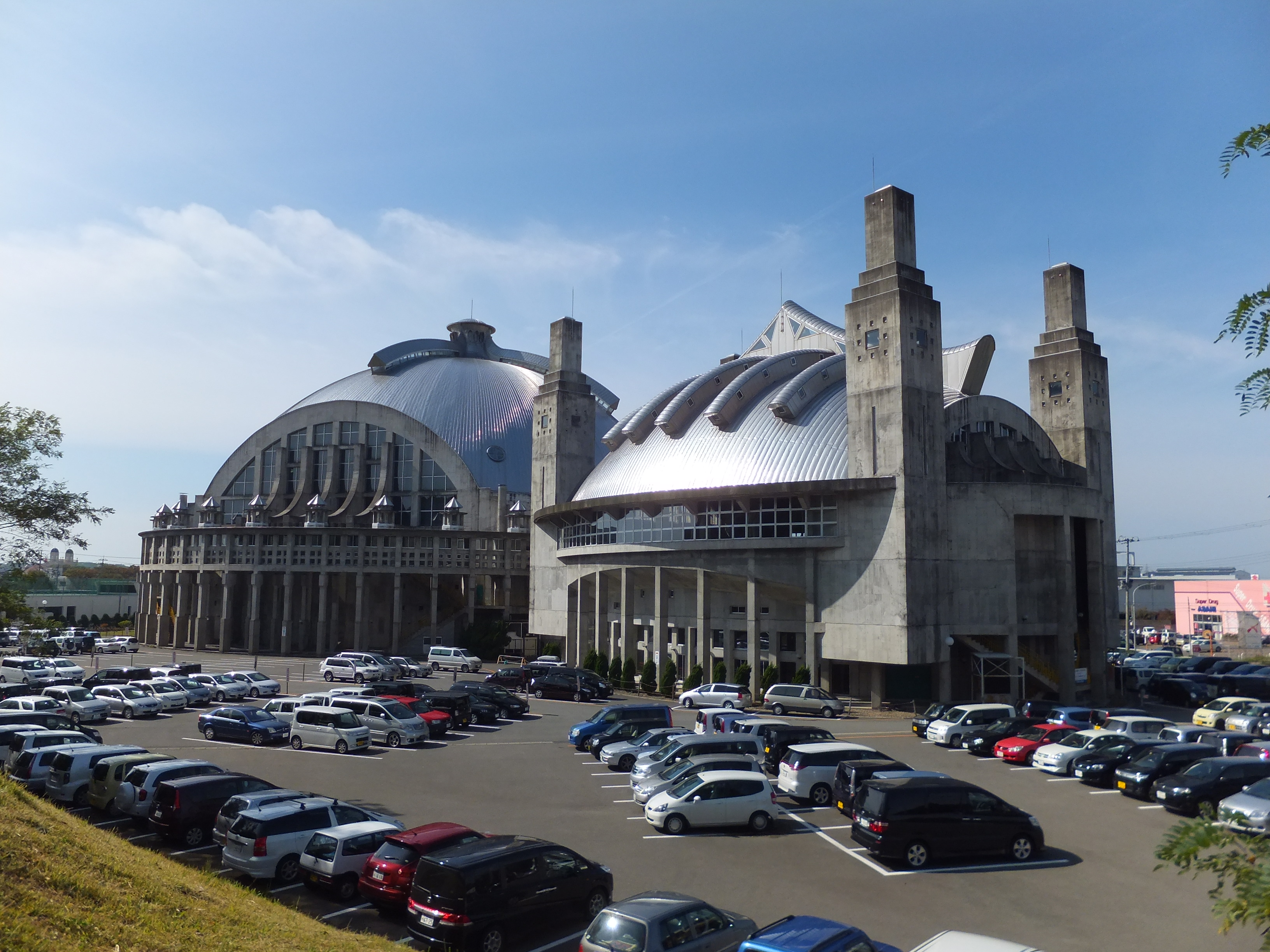
- Akita City Gymnasium
- Venue: Akita City Gymnasium
- Date: 22–23 August 2001
- Competitors: 24 from 16 nations
- Winning total: 28.625 points

Medalists
1st place, gold medalist(s)		(Russia) Irina Tchachina
2nd place, silver medalist(s)		(Russia) Lyasan Utiasheva
3rd place, bronze medalist(s)		(Belarus) Elena Tkachenko

The ball event in rhythmic gymnastics at the 2001 World Games in Akita was played from 22 to 23 August. The competition took place at Akita City Gymnasium.

== Competition format ==
A total of 24 athletes entered the competition. The best eight athletes from preliminary round advances to the final.

== Results ==
=== Preliminary ===
Rank	Athlete	Nation	Score	Note
1	Irina Tchachina	Russia	28.500	Q
2	Lyasan Utiasheva	Russia	26.900	Q
3	Elena Tkachenko	Belarus	26.850	Q
4	Almudena Cid Tostado	Spain	26.400	Q
5	Esther Domínguez	Spain	25.900	Q
6	Ai Yokochi	Japan	25.850	Q
7	Jessica Howard	United States	25.100	Q
8	Mary Sanders	Canada	24.750	Q
9	Yukari Murata	Japan	24.600	
10	Mojca Rode	Slovenia	24.350	
11	Cho Eun-jung	South Korea	24.350	
12	Brigitta Haris	Hungary	24.300	
13	Daniela Masseroni	Italy	23.000	
14	Irina Funtikova	Canada	22.900	
15	Demetra Sergiou	Cyprus	22.750	
16	Catarina Borges	Portugal	21.850	
17	Liliana Teixeira	Portugal	21.800	
18	Kate Riley	Australia	21.750	
19	Olga Karmansky	United States	21.750	
20	Son Eun-jung	South Korea	21.450	
21	Belinda Potgieter	South Africa	20.900	
22	Laura Vernizzi	Italy	20.600	
23	Katarína Beluginová	Slovakia	20.550	
24	Sherin Taama	Egypt	18.800	

=== Final ===
Rank	Athlete	Nation	Score
1st place, gold medalist(s)	Irina Tchachina	Russia	28.625
2nd place, silver medalist(s)	Lyasan Utiasheva	Russia	28.200
3rd place, bronze medalist(s)	Elena Tkachenko	Belarus	27.125
4	Almudena Cid Tostado	Spain	26.300
5	Jessica Howard	United States	25.400
6	Esther Domínguez	Spain	25.050
7	Mary Sanders	Canada	24.975
8	Ai Yokochi	Japan	24.800
