= Rhythmic gymnastics at the 2001 World Games – Hoop =

Rhythmic gymnastics - hoop at the 2001 World Games
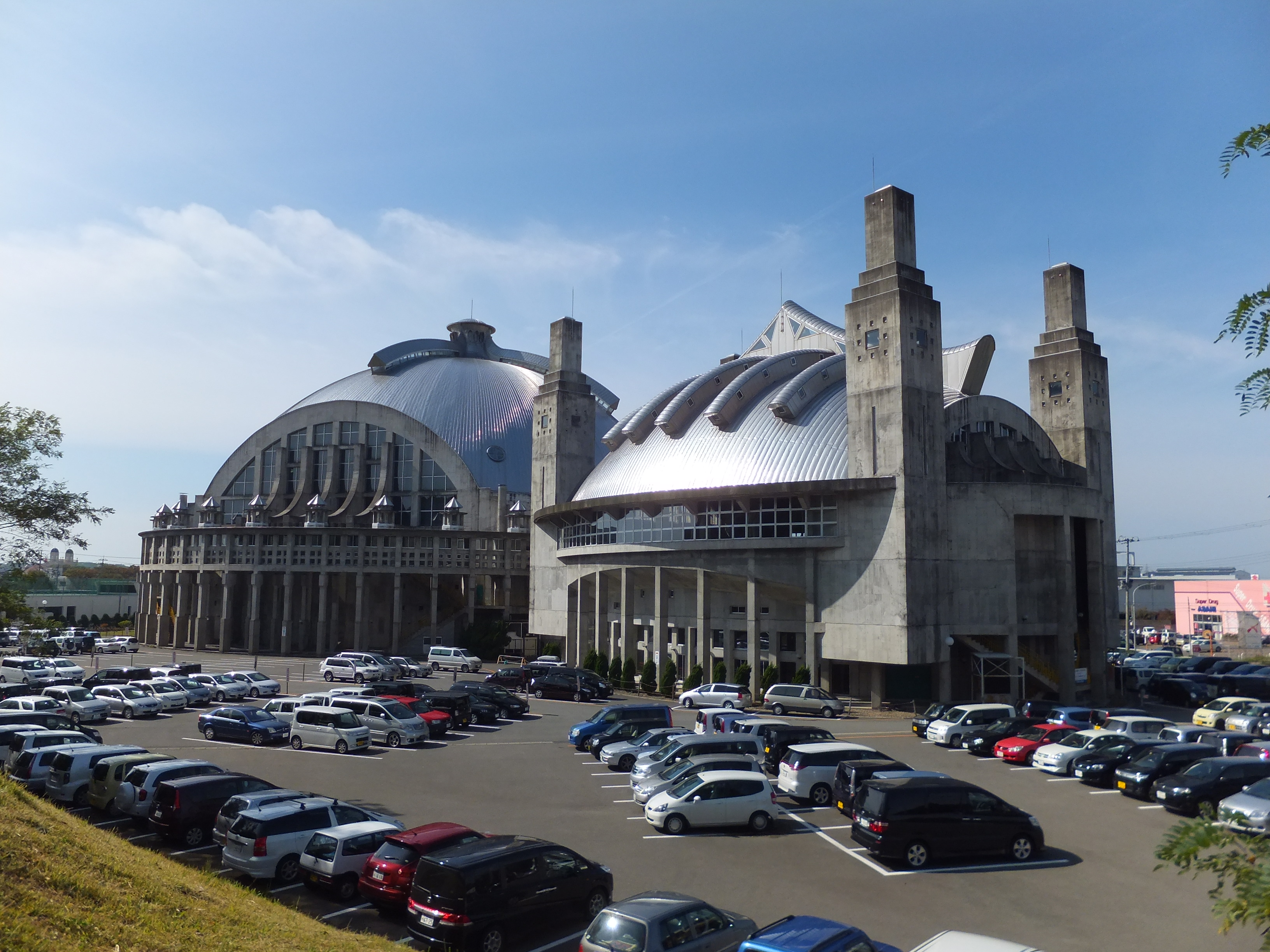
- Akita City Gymnasium
- Venue: Akita City Gymnasium
- Date: 22–23 August 2001
- Competitors: 24 from 16 nations
- Winning total: 28.175 points

Medalists
1st place, gold medalist(s)		(Russia) Irina Tchachina
2nd place, silver medalist(s)		(Russia) Lyasan Utiasheva
3rd place, bronze medalist(s)		(Belarus) Elena Tkachenko

The hoop event in rhythmic gymnastics at the 2001 World Games in Akita was played from 22 to 23 August. The competition took place at Akita City Gymnasium.

== Competition format ==
A total of 24 athletes entered the competition. The best eight athletes from preliminary round advances to the final.

== Results ==
=== Preliminary ===
Rank	Athlete	Nation	Score	Note
1	Irina Tchachina	Russia	29.050	Q
2	Elena Tkachenko	Belarus	27.450	Q
3	Lyasan Utiasheva	Russia	27.150	Q
4	Esther Domínguez	Spain	26.250	Q
5	Mojca Rode	Slovenia	25.600	Q
6	Almudena Cid Tostado	Spain	25.175	Q
7	Jessica Howard	United States	24.825	Q
8	Yukari Murata	Japan	24.750	Q
9	Cho Eun-jung	South Korea	24.550	
10	Mary Sanders	Canada	24.275	
11	Ai Yokochi	Japan	23.950	
12	Liliana Teixeira	Portugal	23.150	
13	Irina Funtikova	Canada	23.050	
14	Daniela Masseroni	Italy	23.025	
15	Brigitta Haris	Hungary	22.850	
16	Katarína Beluginová	Slovakia	22.750	
17	Olga Karmansky	United States	22.750	
18	Son Eun-jung	South Korea	22.250	
19	Kate Riley	Australia	21.850	
20	Demetra Sergiou	Cyprus	21.825	
21	Catarina Borges	Portugal	21.400	
22	Laura Vernizzi	Italy	21.350	
23	Belinda Potgieter	South Africa	20.300	
24	Sherin Taama	Egypt	20.050	

=== Final ===
Rank	Athlete	Nation	Score
1st place, gold medalist(s)	Irina Tchachina	Russia	28.175
2nd place, silver medalist(s)	Lyasan Utiasheva	Russia	27.850
3rd place, bronze medalist(s)	Elena Tkachenko	Belarus	26.925
4	Almudena Cid Tostado	Spain	25.475
5	Yukari Murata	Japan	25.350
6	Esther Domínguez	Spain	25.225
7	Jessica Howard	United States	24.250
8	Mojca Rode	Slovenia	23.350
