= 2001–2002 FIG Rhythmic Gymnastics World Cup series =

International rhythm gymnastics competition

The 2001–2002 FIG Rhythmic Gymnastics World Cup series was a series of stages where events in rhythmic gymnastics were contested. The series consisted of a two-year long competition, culminating at a final event — the World Cup Final in 2002. A number of qualifier stages were held. The top 3 gymnasts in each apparatus at the qualifier events would receive medals and prize money. Gymnasts that finished in the top 8 also received points which were added up to a ranking that qualified for the biennial World Cup Final.

== Stages ==
Besides specific World Cup stages, the 2001 World Championships was also part of the 2001–2002 World Cup series.

Year	Event	Location	Type	Ref.
2001	World Cup qualifier	(Germany) Berlin	Individuals	
2001	World Championships / World Cup qualifier	(Spain) Madrid	Individuals	
2002	World Cup qualifier	(Russia) Moscow	Individuals	
2002	World Cup qualifier	(France) Corbeil-Essonnes	Individuals	
2002	World Cup Final	(Germany) Stuttgart	Individuals	

== Medalists ==
=== All-around ===
Competitions	Gold	Silver	Bronze
Berlin 2001	(Russia) Lyasan Utiasheva	(Bulgaria) Simona Peycheva	(Russia) Olga Belova
Madrid 2001	(Ukraine) Tamara Yerofeeva	(Bulgaria) Simona Peycheva	(Ukraine) Anna Bessonova
Moscow 2002	(Russia) Zarina Gizikova	(Bulgaria) Simona Peycheva	(Russia) Lyasan Utiasheva
Corbeil 2002	(Russia) Lyasan Utiasheva	(Russia) Zarina Gizikova	(Ukraine) Anna Bessonova
Stuttgart 2002	No all-around competition		

=== Rope ===
Competitions	Gold	Silver	Bronze
Berlin 2001	(Russia) Lyasan Utiasheva	(Bulgaria) Simona Peycheva	(Russia) Olga Belova
Madrid 2001	(Ukraine) Tamara Yerofeeva	(Bulgaria) Simona Peycheva	(Ukraine) Anna Bessonova
Moscow 2002	(Russia) Zarina Gizikova	(Bulgaria) Simona Peycheva	(Russia) Olesya Manuylova
Corbeil 2002	All-around only		
Stuttgart 2002	(Ukraine) Anna Bessonova	(Bulgaria) Simona Peycheva	(Russia) Vera Sessina

=== Hoop ===
Competitions	Gold	Silver	Bronze
Berlin 2001	(Russia) Lyasan Utiasheva	(Kazakhstan) Aliya Yussupova	(Russia) Olga Belova
Madrid 2001	(Bulgaria) Simona Peycheva	(Ukraine) Anna Bessonova	(Ukraine) Tamara Yerofeeva
Moscow 2002	(Russia) Zarina Gizikova	(Ukraine) Tamara Yerofeeva	(Bulgaria) Simona Peycheva
Corbeil 2002	All-around only		
Stuttgart 2002	(Ukraine) Anna Bessonova	(Russia) Zarina Gizikova	(Ukraine) Tamara Yerofeeva

=== Ball ===
Competitions	Gold	Silver	Bronze
Berlin 2001	(Russia) Lyasan Utiasheva	(Bulgaria) Simona Peycheva	(Kazakhstan) Aliya Yussupova
Madrid 2001	(Bulgaria) Simona Peycheva	(Ukraine) Anna Bessonova	(Ukraine) Tamara Yerofeeva
Moscow 2002	(Russia) Zarina Gizikova	(Ukraine) Tamara Yerofeeva	(Kazakhstan) Aliya Yussupova
Corbeil 2002	All-around only		
Stuttgart 2002	(Bulgaria) Simona Peycheva	(Ukraine) Anna Bessonova	(Ukraine) Tamara Yerofeeva

=== Clubs ===
Competitions	Gold	Silver	Bronze
Berlin 2001	(Russia) Lyasan Utiasheva	(Russia) Olga Belova	(Kazakhstan) Aliya Yussupova
Madrid 2001	(Bulgaria) Simona Peycheva	(Belarus) Elena Tkachenko	(Ukraine) Tamara Yerofeeva
Moscow 2002	(Ukraine) Tamara Yerofeeva	(Russia) Zarina Gizikova	(Bulgaria) Simona Peycheva
Corbeil 2002	All-around only		
Stuttgart 2002	(Ukraine) Anna Bessonova	(Bulgaria) Simona Peycheva	(Ukraine) Tamara Yerofeeva

== See also ==
- 2001–2002 FIG Artistic Gymnastics World Cup series
- 2001 Rhythmic Gymnastics Grand Prix circuit
- 2002 Rhythmic Gymnastics Grand Prix circuit
