= Longines Prize for Elegance =

- Awarded for: "...emotional appeal, beauty, charm as well as grace and harmony of movement."
- Country: International
- Presented by: Longines; International Gymnastics Federation
- First award: 1997
- Final award: 2019
- Currently held by: Mélanie de Jesus dos Santos; Sam Mikulak; Laura Zeng

The Longines Prize for Elegance is an award given by Longines to a male and female currently at the World Artistic Gymnastics Championships and the World Rhythmic Gymnastics Championships. The winners receive a trophy, a cheque, and a Longines watch. The prize has been awarded since 1997 and is aimed at honoring the most elegant and charismatic gymnasts. The criteria used by the jury is based on grace, harmonious movement, and emotion during the performances.

== Recipients ==
=== World Artistic Gymnastics Championships ===
==== Women ====
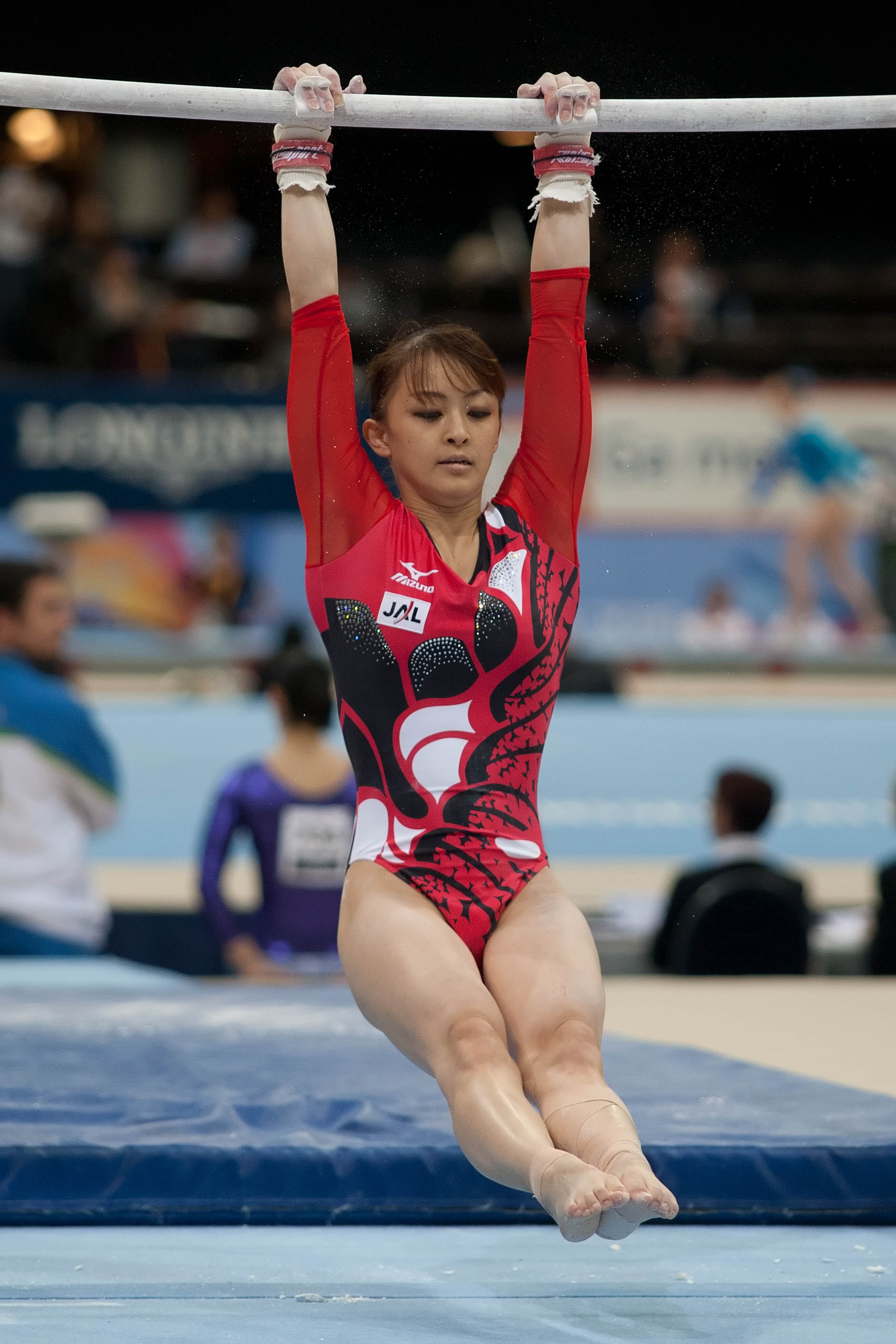
Rie Tanaka at the 2010 World Championships the year she won.

| Year | Winner | Country | Reference |
|---|---|---|---|
| 1999 | Svetlana Khorkina | Russia | |
| 2002 | Elena Zamolodchikova | Russia | |
| 2003 | Carly Patterson | United States | |
| 2005 | Monette Russo | Australia | |
| 2006 | Cheng Fei | China | |
| 2007 | Shawn Johnson | United States | |
| 2009 | Elsa Garcia | Mexico | |
| 2010 | Rie Tanaka | Japan | |
| 2011 | Ana Porgras | Romania | |
| 2013 | Kyla Ross | United States | |
| 2014 | Yao Jinnan | China | |
| 2015 | Giulia Steingruber | Switzerland | |
| 2017 | Brooklyn Moors | Canada | |
| 2018 | Angelina Melnikova | Russia | |
| 2019 | Mélanie de Jesus dos Santos | France | |

==== Men ====
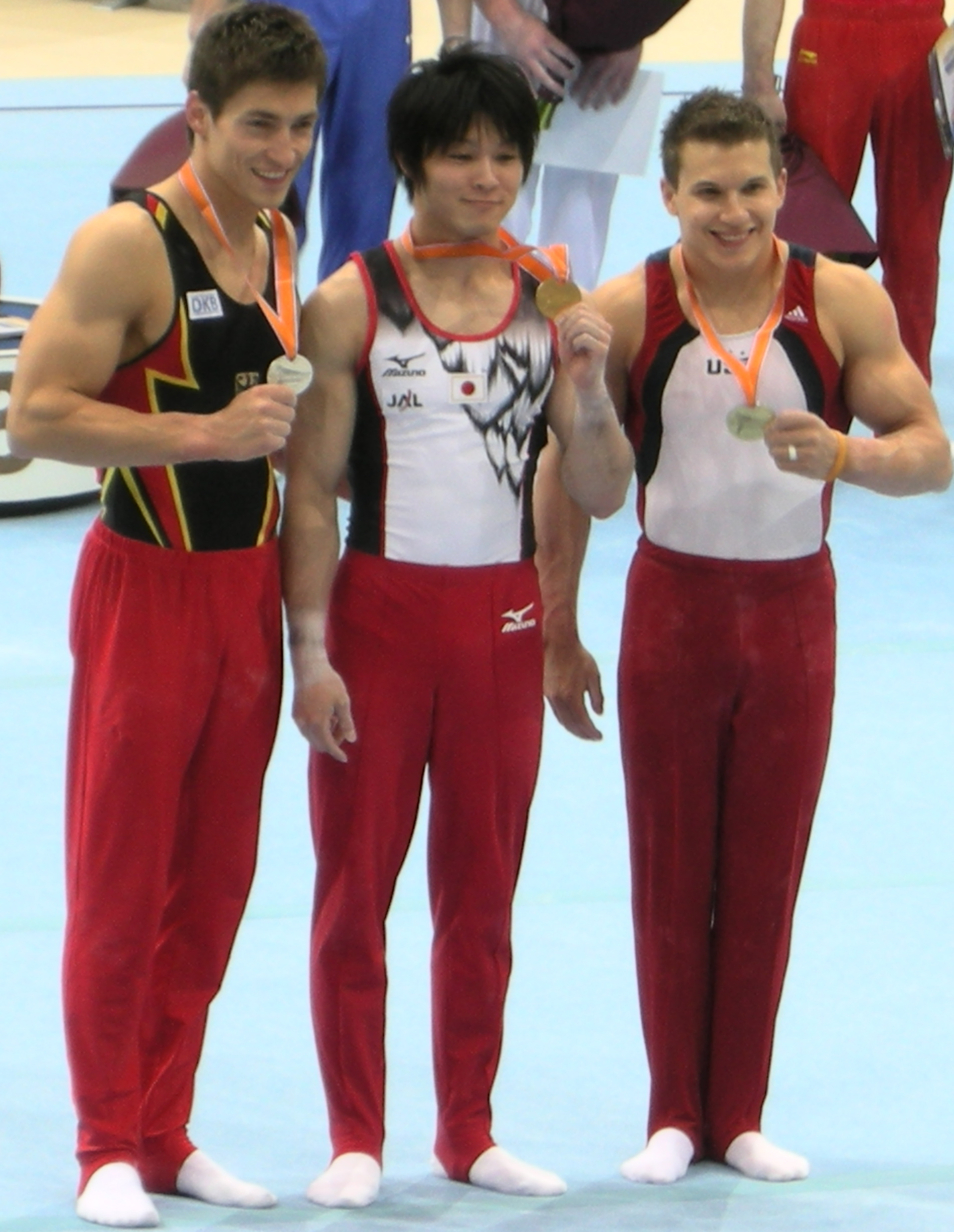
Philipp Boy (left; 2010) and Kohei Uchimura (center; 2011, 2013, 2014) with medals from the 2010 World Championships

| Year | Winner | Country | Reference |
|---|---|---|---|
| 1999 | Yufu Lu | China | |
| 2002 | Xiao Qin | China | |
| 2003 | Yang Wei | China | |
| 2005 | Luis Rivera | Puerto Rico | |
| 2006 | Ivan Ivankov | Belarus | |
| 2007 | Hiroyuki Tomita | Japan | |
| 2009 | Daniel Keatings | United Kingdom | |
| 2010 | Philipp Boy | Germany | |
| 2011 | Kohei Uchimura | Japan | |
| 2013 | Kohei Uchimura | Japan | |
| 2014 | Kohei Uchimura | Japan | |
| 2015 | Max Whitlock | United Kingdom | |
| 2017 | Kenzo Shirai | Japan | |
| 2018 | Artur Dalaloyan | Russia | |
| 2019 | Sam Mikulak | United States | |

=== World Rhythmic Gymnastics Championships ===
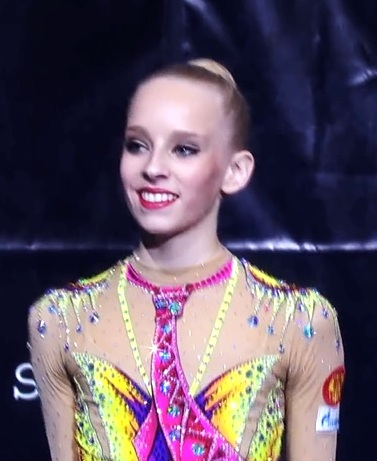
An undated Photograph of Russian Individual Rhythmic Gymnast, Yana Kudryavtseva

| Year | Winner | Country | Reference |
|---|---|---|---|
| 1997 | Natalia Lipkovskaya | Russia | |
| 1998 | Group | Spain | |
| 1999 | Elena Vitrychenko | Ukraine | |
| 2001 | Irina Tchachina | Russia | |
| 2002 | Group | Italy | |
| 2003 | Almudena Cid | Spain | |
| 2005 | Irina Tchachina | Russia | |
| 2007 | Anna Bessonova | Ukraine | |
| 2009 | Anna Bessonova | Ukraine | |
| 2010 | Daria Kondakova | Russia | |
| 2011 | Delphine Ledoux | France | |
| 2013 | Ganna Rizatdinova | Ukraine | |
| 2014 | Yana Kudryavtseva | Russia | |
| 2015 | Margarita Mamun | Russia | |
| 2017 | Alexandra Agiurgiuculese | Italy | |
| 2018 | Aleksandra Soldatova | Russia | |
| 2019 | Laura Zeng | United States | |

== Other events ==
- (Russia) Svetlana Khorkina, 1998 European Women's Artistic Gymnastics Championships
- (Hungary) Viktoria Frater, 1999 European Rhythmic Gymnastics Championships
- (Spain) Esther Dominguez, 2000 European Rhythmic Gymnastics Championships
- (South Korea) Cho Eun-jung, 2002 Asian Games
- (United Kingdom) Rebecca Downie, 2016 European Women's Artistic Gymnastics Championships
- (Russia) David Belyavskiy, 2016 European Men's Artistic Gymnastics Championships
