= 2001 European Rhythmic Gymnastics Championships =

2001 Rhythmic Gymnastics European Championships
- Location: Geneva, Switzerland
- Start date: 15 June 2001
- End date: 17 June 2001

The 17th Rhythmic Gymnastics European Championships were held in Geneva, Switzerland, from 15 to 17 June 2001. Medals were contested in two disciplines : senior individuals and senior groups.

== Medal winners ==
Event	Gold	Silver	Bronze
Senior Individual
Rope	Irina Tchachina; Russia	Alina Kabaeva; Russia	Elena Tkachenko; Belarus
Hoop	Alina Kabaeva; Russia	Irina Tchachina; Russia	Tamara Yerofeeva; Ukraine
Ball	Alina Kabaeva; Russia	Irina Tchachina; Russia	Elena Tkachenko; Belarus
Clubs	Alina Kabaeva; Russia	Irina Tchachina; Russia	Tamara Yerofeeva; Ukraine
Senior Groups
All-Around	Russia	Greece	Belarus
5 clubs	Russia	Ukraine	Greece
2 balls 3 ropes	Belarus	Greece	Bulgaria
Junior Groups
5 ropes	Russia	Greece	Belarus

== Individual ==
=== Rope ===
Place	Nation	Name	Result
1	(Russia)	Irina Tchachina	28.825
2	(Russia)	Alina Kabaeva	28.100
3	(Belarus)	Elena Tkachenko	27.100
4	(Bulgaria)	Simona Peycheva	26.675
5	(Belarus)	Olena Osiadovskaya	26.325
6	(Poland)	Magdalena Markowska	26.200
7	(Ukraine)	Tamara Yerofeeva	26.150
8	(Italy)	Laura Zacchilli	26.125
...			
17	(Switzerland)	Nadia Lutz	23.925

=== Hoop ===
Place	Nation	Name	Result
1	(Russia)	Alina Kabaeva	29.250
2	(Russia)	Irina Tchachina	28.800
3	(Ukraine)	Tamara Yerofeeva	27.500
4	(Belarus)	Elena Tkachenko	26.900
5	(Belarus)	Olena Osiadovskaya	26.825
6	(Bulgaria)	Simona Peycheva	26.350
7	(Italy)	Laura Zacchilli	26.150
8	(Spain)	Esther Dominguez	26.025
...			
17	(Italy)	Daniela Masseroni	23.550

=== Ball ===
Place	Nation	Name	Result
1	(Russia)	Alina Kabaeva	29.175
2	(Russia)	Irina Tchachina	28.525
3	(Belarus)	Elena Tkachenko	27.250
4	(Belarus)	Olena Osiadovskaya	27.050
5	(Ukraine)	Tamara Yerofeeva	27.050
6	(Italy)	Laura Zacchilli	26.925
7	(Spain)	Almudena Cid	26.300
8	(Bulgaria)	Simona Peycheva	26.225
...			
17	(France)	Aurélie Lacour	24.100

=== Clubs ===
Place	Nation	Name	Result
1	(Russia)	Alina Kabaeva	28.650
2	(Russia)	Irina Tchachina	27.900
3	(Ukraine)	Tamara Yerofeeva	27.200
4	(Belarus)	Olena Osiadovskaya	26.300
5	(Italy)	Laura Zacchilli	26.300
6	(Bulgaria)	Simona Peycheva	26.250
7	(Poland)	Magdalena Markowska	26.175
8	(Spain)	Almudena Cid	26.100
...			
17	(Germany)	Sandy Liebhenschel	23.950

== Groups ==
=== Senior All-Around ===
Rank	Group	5 Clubs (rhythmic gymnastics)	2 Balls 3 Ropes (rhythmic gymnastics)	Total
1st place, gold medalist(s)	Russia	28.600	27.300	55.900
2nd place, silver medalist(s)	Greece	27.950	27.350	55.300
3rd place, bronze medalist(s)	Belarus	27.775	27.150	54.925
4	Bulgaria	27.425	26.700	54.125
5	Ukraine	26.825	25.900	52.725
6	Italy	26.600	25.550	52.150
7	Spain	25.650	24.875	50.520
8	Switzerland	25.850	24.250	50.100
9	Poland	24.700	25.325	50.025
10	Hungary	24.925	24.850	49.775
11	Slovakia	24.250	24.700	48.950
12	Czech Republic	24.500	23.950	48.450
13	Finland	24.825	23.575	48.400
14	Estonia	24.600	23.650	48.250
15	Latvia	24.000	22.750	46.750
16	Austria	22.600	22.950	45.550
17	Portugal	22.875	22.050	44.925
18	Lithuania	22.350	20.950	43.300
19	Azerbaijan	20.050	17.150	37.200

=== Final Senior 5 Clubs ===
Place	Nation	Result
1	Russia	28.075
2	Ukraine	27.650
3	Greece	27.600
4	Bulgaria	27.350
5	Belarus	26.550
6	Switzerland	24.950
7	Spain	24.100
8	Italy	23.700

=== Final Senior 2 balls 3 ropes ===
Place	Nation	Result
1	Belarus	26.400
2	Greece	26.200
3	Bulgaria	26.125
4	Ukraine	26.000
5	Russia	25.850
6	Italy	24.875
7	Poland	24.400
8	Spain	24.100

=== Final Junior 5 Ropes ===
Place	Nation	Result
1	Russia	25.450
2	Greece	26.200
3	Belarus	24.400
4	Bulgaria	24.175
5	Ukraine	23.875
6	France	23.750
7	Israel	23.050
8	Germany	22.475

== Medals table ==
Rank	Nation	Gold	Silver	Bronze	Total
1	Russia (RUS)	7	4	0	11
2	Belarus (BLR)	1	0	4	5
3	Greece (GRE)	0	3	1	4
4	Ukraine (UKR)	0	1	2	3
5	Bulgaria (BUL)	0	0	1	1
Totals (5 entries)		8	8	8	24
