= Iva Tepeshanova =

Bulgarian rhythmic gymnast (born 1983)

- Born: 19 February 1983 (age 43) Sofia, Bulgaria
- Height: 165 cm (5 ft 5 in) (at the 2000 Olympics)

Gymnastics career
- Discipline: Rhythmic gymnastics
- Country represented: Bulgaria
- Club: Levski Sofia, Sofia
Medal record
Representing Bulgaria
World Championships
Bronze medal – third place	2001 Madrid	Team

Iva Tepeshanova (Bulgarian: Ива Тепешанова; born 19 February 1983 in Sofia) is a Bulgarian former individual rhythmic gymnast. She won a team bronze medal at the 2001 World Championships.

== Career ==
In 1999, Tepeshanova came in second place in the junior all-around at the Bulgarian championships.

The next season, she competed at the Julietta Shishmanova tournament in May, where she won the silver medal behind Esther Domínguez and just ahead of fellow Bulgarian Teodora Alexandrova. In June, she competed at the 2000 European Championships in Zaragoza along with Alexandrova. She reached the all-around final and finished in 18th place.

Originally, Alexandrova was set to compete in the rhythmic gymnastics individual all-around competition at the 2000 Summer Olympics in Sydney. However, after she broke her leg, the Bulgarian federation voted to replace her with Tepeshanova in late August. Tepeshanova was given only a month and a half to prepare. At the Olympics, she was 15th in the qualification round and did not advance to the final of 10 competitors.

Her last major competition was the 2001 World Championships in Madrid. Along with her teammates Simona Peycheva, Yuliana Naidenova, and Elizabeth Paisieva, she won the bronze medal in the team event.

After her competitive career, Tepeshanova was a soloist in a show run and co-choreographed by Lilia Ignatova in 2006. The show told the story of Orpheus and Eurydice using a combination of dance and rhythmic gymnastics. Tepeshanova performed in a showing at the Royal Albert Hall.
