= Rhythmic gymnastics at the 2001 World Games =

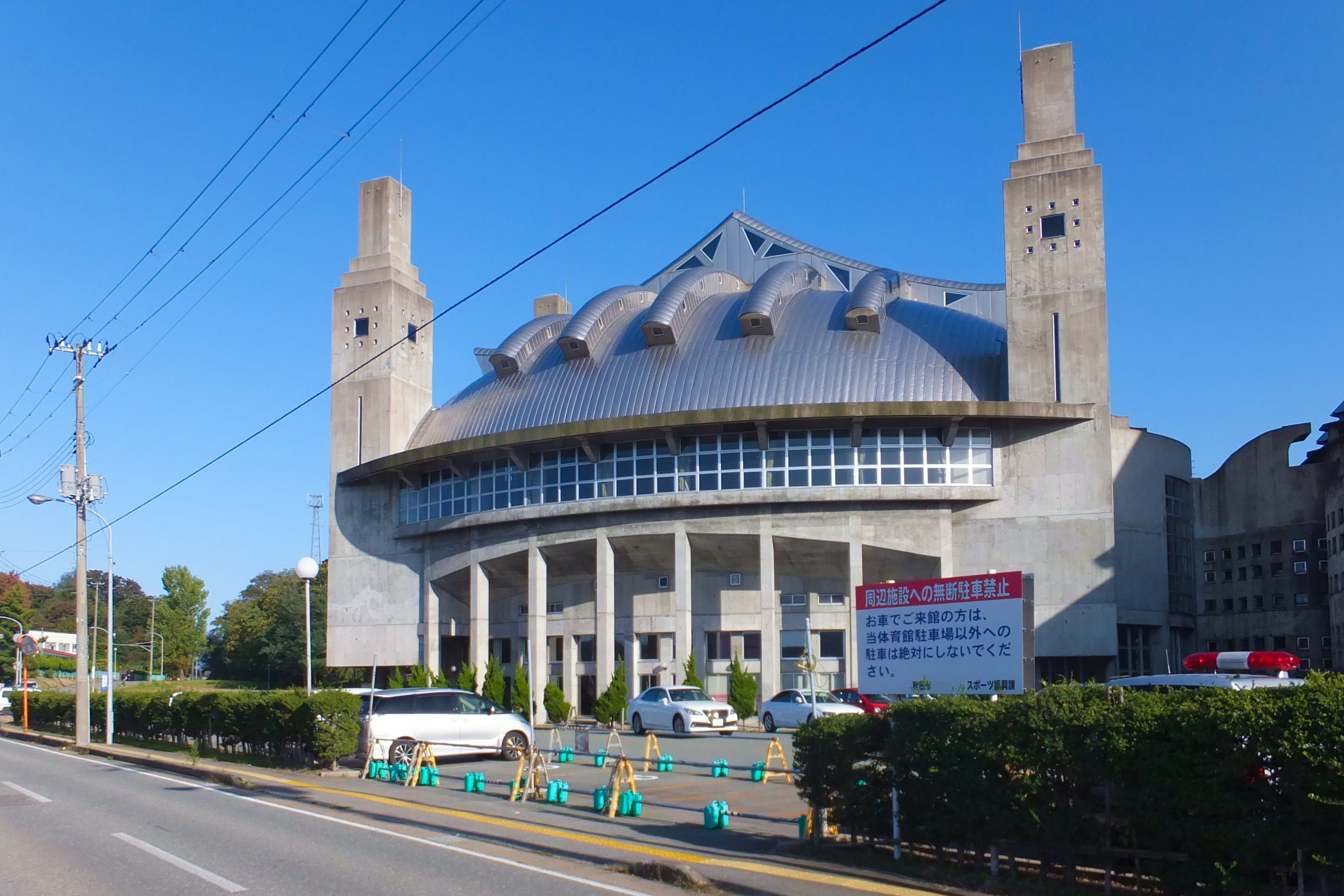
- Akita City Gymnasium
- Venue: Akita City Gymnasium
- Dates: 22–23 August 2001
- Competitors: 24 from 16 nations

The rhythmic gymnastics events at the 2001 World Games in Akita was played between 22 and 23 August. 24 rhythmic gymnastics competitors, from 16 nations, participated in the tournament. The rhythmic gymnastics competition took place at Akita City Gymnasium.

== Participating nations ==
- Australia (1)
- Belarus (1)
- Canada (2)
- Cyprus (1)
- Egypt (1)
- Hungary (1)
- Italy (2)
- Japan (2)
- Portugal (2)
- Russia (2)
- Slovakia (1)
- Slovenia (1)
- South Africa (1)
- South Korea (2)
- Spain (2)
- United States (2)

== Medal table ==
Rank	Nation	Gold	Silver	Bronze	Total
1	Russia	4	4	0	8
2	Belarus	0	0	4	4
Totals (2 entries)		4	4	4	12

== Events ==
Event	Gold	Silver	Bronze
Rope	Irina Tchachina; Russia	Lyasan Utiasheva; Russia	Elena Tkachenko; Belarus
Hoop	Irina Tchachina; Russia	Lyasan Utiasheva; Russia	Elena Tkachenko; Belarus
Ball	Irina Tchachina; Russia	Lyasan Utiasheva; Russia	Elena Tkachenko; Belarus
Clubs	Irina Tchachina; Russia	Lyasan Utiasheva; Russia	Elena Tkachenko; Belarus
