= Elizabeth Paisieva =

Bulgarian rhythmic gymnast (born 1986)

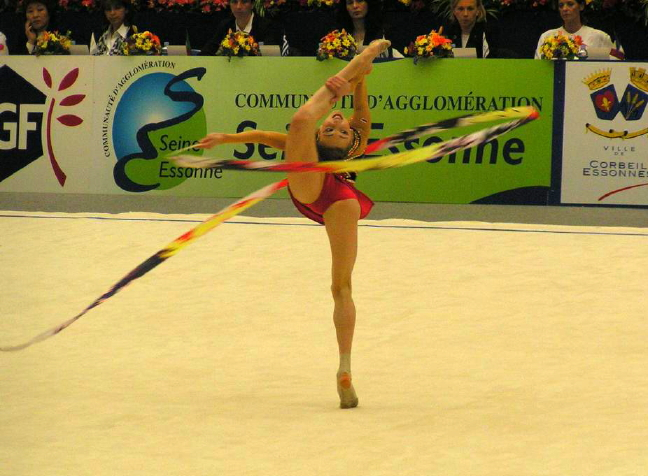
- Paisieva performing with the ribbon in 2004

Personal information
- Full name: Elisabet Vladimirova Paisieva
- Born: 17 December 1986 (age 39) Sofia
- Height: 167 cm (5 ft 6 in)

Gymnastics career
- Discipline: Rhythmic gymnastics
- Country represented: Bulgaria
- Club: Iliana
- Head coach: Ivanka Vidolova
- Assistant coaches: Iliana Raeva, Stella Salapatiyska
- Choreographer: Milena Bourchina
Medal record
Representing Bulgaria
World Championships
Bronze medal – third place	2001 Madrid	Team
Bronze medal – third place	2003 Budapest	Ribbon
European Championships
Bronze medal – third place	2002 Granada	Team

Elisabet Vladimirova Paisieva (Bulgarian: Елизабет Владимирова Паисиева, born 17 December 1986), also known as Elizabeth Paisieva or Paysieva, is a Bulgarian retired rhythmic gymnast. She competed at two Olympic Games (2004 and 2008). She now works as a coach.

== Career ==
Paisieva began gymnastics after her mother took her to a gym. She joined the national team at 14 and competed at her first World Championships in 2001 in Madrid, where she was the youngest competitor. Along with her teammates Simona Peycheva, Yuliana Naidenova, and Iva Tepeshanova, she won the bronze medal in the team event. Individually, she finished ninth in the all-around.

She competed at the 2002 European Championships, where she won another bronze in the team event with her teammate Peycheva. She finished 14th in the all-around final.

At the 2003 World Championships, extra pressure was on Paiseva, as her more successful teammate Peycheva had failed an anti-doping test shortly before the competition, and Olympic quotas were available at the competition. Paiseva helped win two quotas for Bulgaria, and she also won a bronze in the ribbon final.

She competed at the 2004 European Championships. However, the Bulgarian federation withdrew her after the qualification round, where she placed 12th, in protest of scores they said were unfairly low. At the 2004 Summer Olympics she finished 12th overall in the rhythmic individual all-around competition and did not reach the final.

Paisieva competed at the 2006 European Championships and placed 11th, and at the 2007 World Championships, where she finished in 15th. At the 2008 Summer Olympics, she placed 19th in qualifications. This was her last competition before she retired.

After completing her competitive career, Paisieva graduated from the National Sports Academy "Vasil Levski" and became a coach, and she also studied dance. In 2010, she moved to Norway to coach; she later moved to Paris to coach there, then returned to Norway and became the manager of the Norwegian national team. She moved back to Bulgaria and was appointed assistant coach of the national junior group for 2026 and 2027.
