= 2001 World Rhythmic Gymnastics Championships =

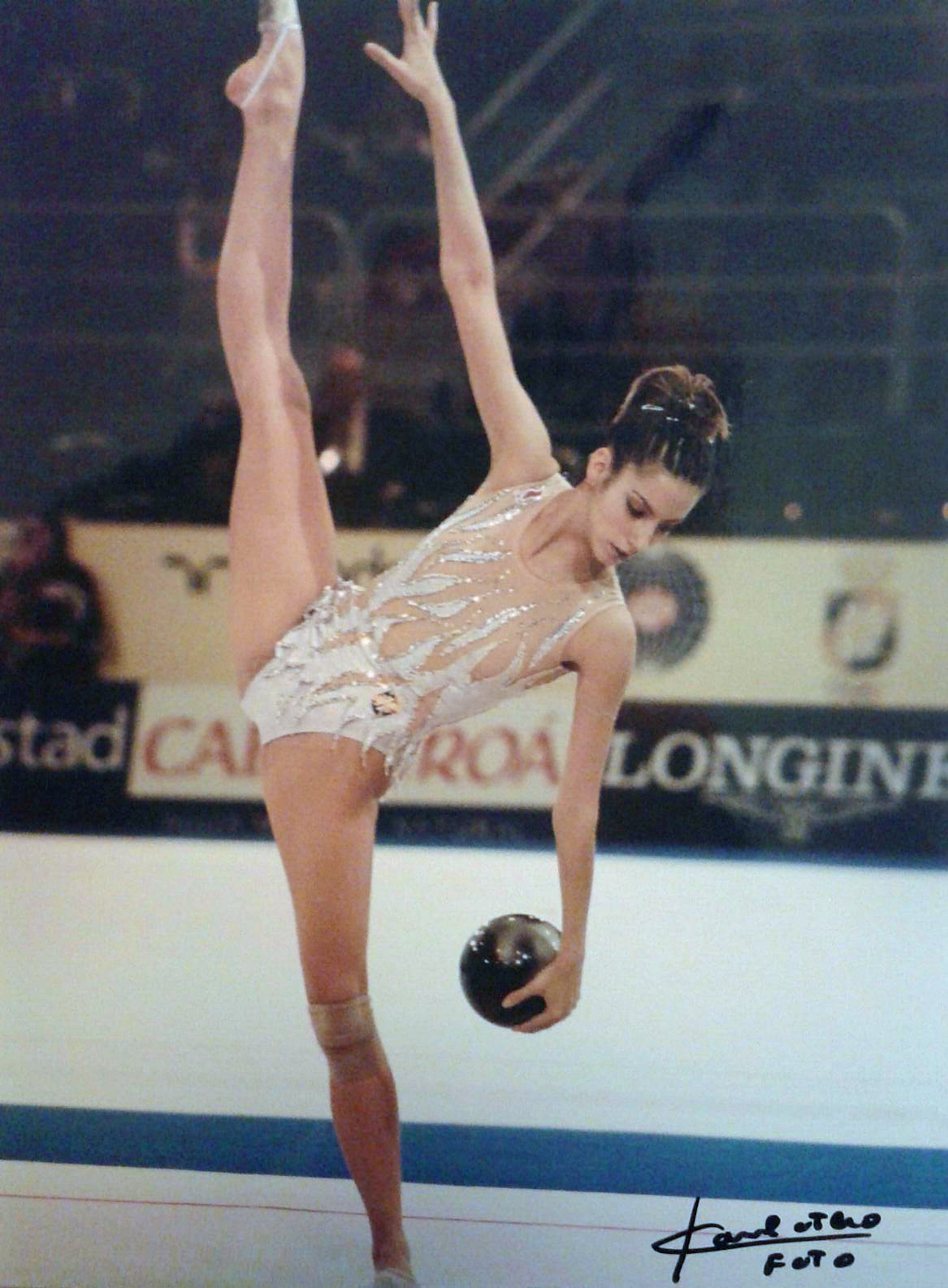
- Location: Madrid, Spain
- Start date: 18 October 2001
- End date: 21 October 2001

XXIV World Rhythmic Gymnastics Championships were held in Madrid, the capital of Spain, October 18–21, 2001

The Russian Team (Alina Kabaeva and Irina Tchachina) were stripped of their medals in individual and group results after tested positive to a banned diuretic at 2001 Goodwill Games, few months earlier. Ukraine became the gold medalist in Team, with Belarus Silver and Bulgaria moved up to Bronze.

== Medal winners ==
Event	Gold	Silver	Bronze
Team Competition
All-Around	Ukraine; Tamara Yerofeeva; Anna Bessonova; Natalia Godunko; Olena Dzybchuk	Belarus; Elena Tkachenko; Inna Zhukova; Olena Osiadovskaya; Natalia Palchevskaia	Bulgaria; Simona Peycheva; Elizabeth Paysieva; Yuliana Naudenova; Iva Tepechanova
Individual Finals
All-Around	Tamara Yerofeeva (UKR)	Simona Peycheva (BUL)	Anna Bessonova (UKR)
Rope	Tamara Yerofeeva (UKR)	Simona Peycheva (BUL)	Anna Bessonova (UKR)
Hoop	Simona Peycheva (BUL)	Anna Bessonova (UKR)	Tamara Yerofeeva (UKR)
Ball	Simona Peycheva (BUL)	Anna Bessonova (UKR)	Tamara Yerofeeva (UKR)
Clubs	Simona Peycheva (BUL)	Elena Tkachenko (BLR)	Tamara Yerofeeva (UKR)

== Individual all-around ==
Rank	Gymnast	Nation	Rope (rhythmic gymnastics)	Hoop (rhythmic gymnastics)	Ball (rhythmic gymnastics)	Clubs (rhythmic gymnastics)	Total
-	Alina Kabaeva	Russia	27.850	28.375	28.250	28.550	113.025
-	Irina Tchachina	Russia	26.850	28.450	26.625	27.825	109.750
1st place, gold medalist(s)	Tamara Yerofeeva	Ukraine	27.125	26.975	26.375	25.750	106.225
2nd place, silver medalist(s)	Simona Peycheva	Bulgaria	26.350	26.975	25.550	27.275	106.150
3rd place, bronze medalist(s)	Anna Bessonova	Ukraine	25.900	26.300	25.775	25.600	103.575
4	Elena Tkachenko	Belarus	24.825	26.175	24.200	26.000	101.200
5	Elizabeth Paysieva	Bulgaria	24.625	23.950	24.000	24.300	96.875
6	Inna Zhukova	Belarus	23.550	24.400	24.100	24.800	96.850
7	Almudena Cid	Spain	24.250	24.625	24.275	23.625	96.775
8	Aliya Yusupova	Kazakhstan	23.525	25.325	23.325	24.525	96.700
9	Zhong Ling	China	23.725	24.475	24.150	23.900	96.250
10	Laura Zacchilli	Italy	23.900	23.625	24.125	23.575	95.225
11	Evmorfia Dona	Greece	22.975	23.825	23.725	24.100	94.625
12	Irina Kikkas	Estonia	23.250	23.800	22.950	23.700	93.700
13	Jennifer Colino	Spain	22.550	22.550	22.500	22.775	90.375
14	Hannah McKibbin	United Kingdom	21.300	22.050	21.700	20.550	85.600
15	Zhu Minhong	China	20.650	22.475	21.275	20.925	85.325
16	Rebecca Jose	United Kingdom	21.700	20.600	21.550	21.350	85.200
17	Magda Mohameda	Latvia	20.200	21.750	20.550	22.200	84.700
18	Mary Sanders	Canada	19.825	21.850	22.000	21.000	84.675
19	Eleni Andriola	Greece	20.050	21.750	20.050	22.350	84.200
20	Mojca Rode	Slovenia	20.325	21.325	20.850	21.450	83.950
21	Vanda Kereselidze	Georgia	20.925	20.550	20.575	21.750	83.800
22	Dusica Jeremic	Slovenia	20.675	21.625	20.675	20.650	83.625
23	Yael Yunger	Israel	20.500	20.350	21.450	21.200	83.500
24	Aurélie Lacour	France	19.900	20.875	20.850	21.000	82.625
25	Aida Krasnikova	Kazakhstan	20.400	20.600	19.750	21.550	82.300
26	Anahí Sosa	Argentina	18.975	21.900	20.575	20.075	81.525
27	Olga Lukianov	Germany	20.475	20.175	20.000	20.875	81.525
28	Olga Gusarchuk	Latvia	20.250	20.375	20.350	20.075	81.050

== Individual Rope ==
Place	Nation	Name	Result
-	(Russia)	Alina Kabaeva	27.925
-	(Russia)	Irina Tchachina	27.250
1	(Ukraine)	Tamara Yerofeeva	26.025
2	(Bulgaria)	Simona Peycheva	25.950
3	(Ukraine)	Anna Bessonova	25.700
4	(Belarus)	Elena Tkachenko	25.000
5	(Bulgaria)	Elizabeth Paysieva	24.575
6	(Belarus)	Inna Zhukova	24.400

== Individual Hoop ==
Place	Nation	Name	Result
-	(Russia)	Irina Tchachina	27.500
-	(Russia)	Alina Kabaeva	27.450
1	(Bulgaria)	Simona Peycheva	26.175
2	(Ukraine)	Anna Bessonova	25.900
3	(Ukraine)	Tamara Yerofeeva	25.700
4	(Spain)	Almudena Cid	24.750
5	(Belarus)	Elena Tkachenko	24.400
6	(Belarus)	Inna Zhukova	24.225

== Individual Ball ==
Place	Nation	Name	Result
-	(Russia)	Alina Kabaeva	27.950
-	(Russia)	Irina Tchachina	27.275
1	(Bulgaria)	Simona Peycheva	26.625
2	(Ukraine)	Anna Bessonova	26.100
3	(Ukraine)	Tamara Yerofeeva	25.700
4	(Belarus)	Elena Tkachenko	25.250
5	(Italy)	Laura Zacchilli	24.700
6	(Belarus)	Inna Zhukova	23.600

== Individual Clubs ==
Place	Nation	Name	Result
-	(Russia)	Alina Kabaeva	28.375
-	(Russia)	Irina Tchachina	27.525
1	(Bulgaria)	Simona Peycheva	27.275
2	(Belarus)	Elena Tkachenko	25.725
3	(Ukraine)	Tamara Yerofeeva	25.600
4	(Ukraine)	Anna Bessonova	25.325
5	(Belarus)	Olena Osiadovskaya	25.325
6	(Bulgaria)	Elizabeth Paysieva	25.000

== Team All-Around ==
Place	Nation	Gymnasts	Total
-	Russia	Alina Kabaeva; Irina Tchachina; Lyasan Utiasheva; Olga Belova	-
1	Ukraine	Tamara Yerofeeva; Anna Bessonova; Natalia Godunko; Olena Dzybchuk	258.875
2	Belarus	Elena Tkachenko; Inna Zhukova; Elona Osyadovskaya; Natalia Palchevskaia	254.500
3	Bulgaria	Simona Peycheva; Elizabeth Paysieva; Yuliana Naidenova; Iva Tepechanova	253.975
4	Spain	Almudena Cid; Jennifer Colino; Carolina Rodriguez	235.300
5	Kazakhstan	Aliya Yussupova; Aida Krasnikova; Zaira Zakupova; Rimma Khairoulina	229.375
6	Greece	Dona Evmorfia; Varvara Magnisali; Eleni Andriola; Efthalia Paliarouta	226.575
7	China	Zhong Ling; Zhang Shuo; Sun Dan; Zhu Minhong	225.350
8	Italy	Laura Zacchilli; Desirée Pagliaccia; Daniela Masseroni; Laura Vernizzi	225.150
9	United-Kingdom	Hannah McKibbin; Rebecca Jose; Jacqueline Steinke	219.475
10	France	Aurélie Lacour; Delphine Ledoux; Jennifer Wolff; Florence Meynard	216.425
