= Rubén Orihuela =

Spanish rhythmic gymnast

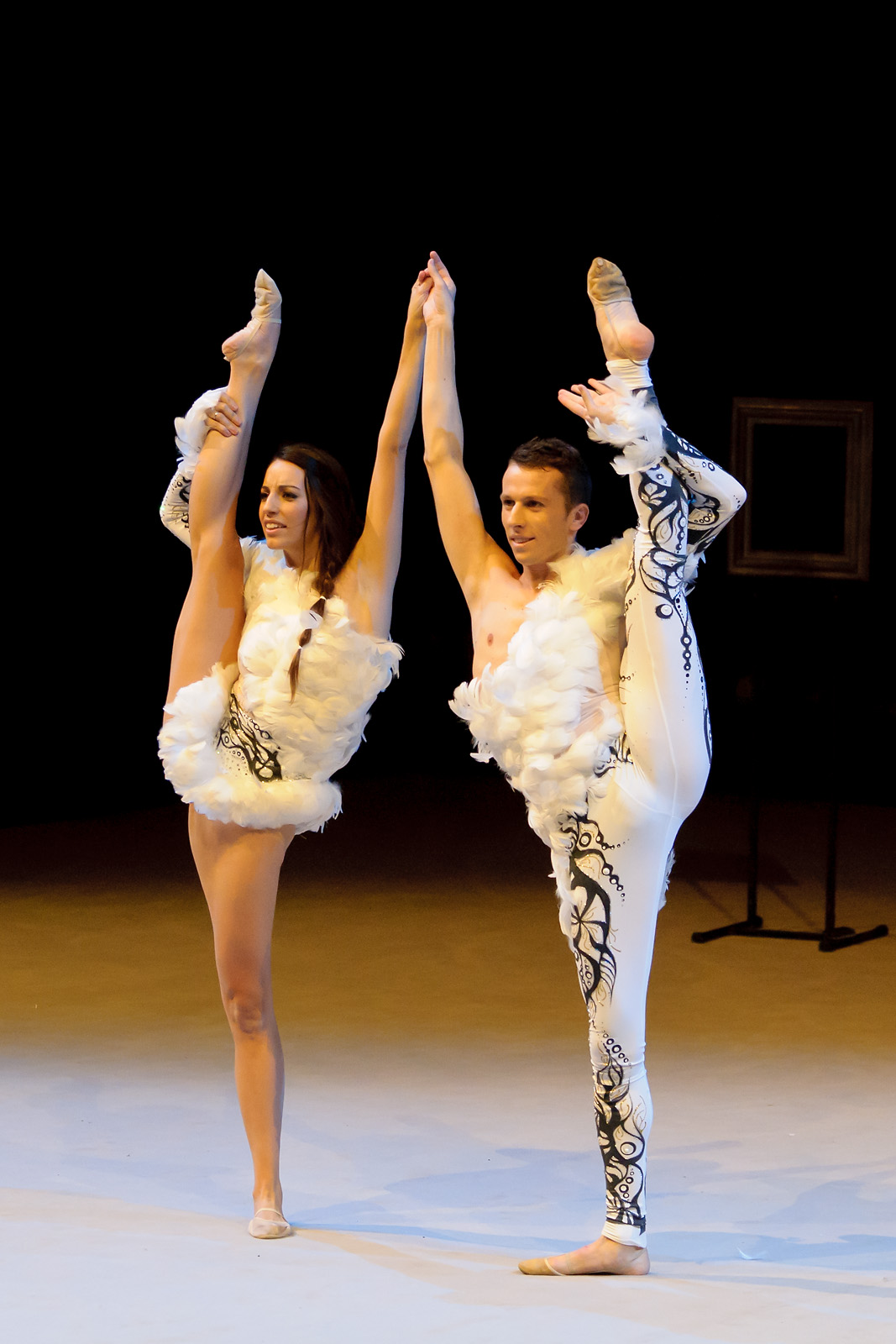
- Rubén and Almudena Cid in Euskalgym 2014.

Personal information
- Full name: Rubén Orihuela Gavilán
- Born: 7 September 1987 (age 38) Valencia, Spain

Gymnastics career
- Discipline: Rhythmic gymnastics

Rubén Orihuela Gavilán (born 1987) is a Spanish rhythmic gymnast.

== Career ==
Orihuela was born in Valencia, Spain in 1987, and at age 10 he started practicing rhythmic gymnastics, a discipline largely performed by women and girls.

In 2005 the Real Federación Española de Gimnasia (RFEG), Spain's gymnastics governing body, started to allow for two spots by autonomous community in the open modality of the national championship could to be filled by men, but this was overturned in January 2009 following a statement from the International Federation of Gymnastics that "rhythmic gymnastics is a women's sport, and that [the Federation] doesn't have rules for male competition."

After the decision was heavily criticized the RFEG stated that the case was being re-evaluated, and on 9 February it was announced that an official male national championship would be established, using the existing rules for the open modality. The first edition of the championship took place in May 2009, in Gijón. Orihuela was the winner in the senior category in 2007, 2008, 2009, 2010, 2011, 2012, 2013, 2014 and 2016.
