= Elona Ossiadovskaya =

Russian rhythmic gymnast

- Born: 30 October 1984 (age 42) or 29 October 1984 (age 42) Minsk, Bielorussian SSR, Soviet Union

Gymnastics career
- Discipline: Rhythmic gymnastics
- Country represented: Russia
Medal record
Representing Russia
Rhythmic Gymnastics
Event	1st	2nd	3rd
World Championships	0	1	1
European Championships	0	0	1
Total	0	1	2
World Championships
Silver medal – second place	1999 Osaka	Team all-around
Bronze medal – third place	2003 Budapest	Group all-around
European Championships
Bronze medal – third place	2003 Riesa	Group 5 ribbons

Elona Ossiadovskaya (alt. sp.: Olena Osiadovskaya, Ilona and Alyona Osyadovskaya; Russian: Элона Владимировна Осядовская; born 29 or 30 October 1984) is a Belarussian rhythmic gymnast, who competed both individually and in groups. After her competitive career ended, she became a judge.

== Early life and career ==
Ossiadovskaya was born on 29 or 30 October 1984 in Minsk.

She began her career as an individual rhythmic gymnast. In 1997, she won a gold medal at the junior Belarus championships.

In 1997 and 1998, she represented Belarus at the Aeon Cup in Tokyo, Japan, as a member of the Dynamo Minsk club team.

She was selected for the national team at the 1999 World Rhythmic Gymnastics Championships to be held in Osaka, Japan, and helped Belarus to the team all-around silver.

She then competed at the 2001 European Rhythmic Gymnastics Championships in Geneva, Switzerland, and at the 2001 World Rhythmic Gymnastics Championships in Madrid, Spain.

Later, she switched to group rhythmic gymnastics and started training with the Belarusian national group.

In 2003, the Belarusian national group she was part of first won the 5-ribbons bronze at the European Championships and then, in September, the all-around bronze at the World Championships, thus qualifying for the following year's Olympics.

She had to end her gymnastics career at 19 due to an injury.

== Competitive highlights ==
As an individual gymnast

Year	Event	Team	AA	Hoop	Ball	Clubs	Ribb.
International
1997	Aeon Cup		3rd J				
1998	Aeon Cup	1st	2nd J				
1999	World Championships	2nd	142nd Q				

As a Belarus national group member

- 2003 European Rhythmic Gymnastics Championships — (bronze) 5 ribbons
- 2003 World Rhythmic Gymnastics Championships — (bronze) All-around
