= Kayno Yesno Slonce =

Bulgarian band

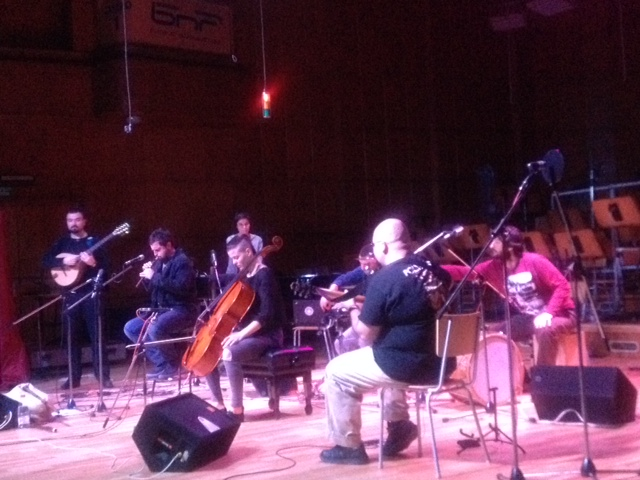
- Kaino Jesno Slonce Studio 1 concert at the Bulgarian National Radio, Sofia, March 22, 2016

Background information
- Origin: Bulgaria
- Genres: Ethno rock, bulgarian rock, Folk rock, Traditional music
- Years active: 2003–present
- Members: Veselin Mitev; Stanislav Stoyanov “Toni Horo” Peter Delchev; Alexey Cvetanov; Yulia Uzunova; Evgeni Chakalov; Alexandra Shkodrova
- Website: www.kayno.bg

Kayno Yesno Slonce is a Bulgarian folk rock band formed in 2003. Though tending to reach beyond mainstream culture and at some points acting as a counter to it and to commercial success, Kayno Yesno Slonce's music was praised at several occasions by some of the most popular Bulgarian newspapers.

The band's current line-up comprises Veselin Mitev (lead vocals, bagpipe, kaval, duduk), Stanislav Stoyanov “Toni Horo” (tupan, zarb, percussion), Peter Delchev (tambura, hang), Evgeni Chakalov (flutes, tambura), Alexey Cvetanov (wavedrum, percussion), Yulia Uzunova (synthesizers, glockenspiel) and Alexandra Shkodrova (gadulka).

Guest musicians of the band vary but included in the past: Pavel Terziiski (vocal), Vlado Chivlidjanov (duduk, bagpipe), Kalin Yordanov (vocals, daf, bendir, darbouka) and Shtoni Kokudev (bagpipe, typan), Tsvetan Hadjiiski (vocals and bagpipe, from the Bulgarian band Smallman) among others.

== History ==
Kayno Yesno Slonce's members changed at various occasions after 2006, regrouping around Veselin Mitev (from the band Isihia) who afterwards remained the only original member, although former members sometimes take part in stage performances.

Peter Delchev also initially joined Kayno Yesno Slonce as a parallel project to his participation in Isihia.

The popularity of their album from 2015 was partly due to the renewed concert activities around the country.

The name of the band is related both with the musical traditions imbedded in its music and those further explored by the musicians. It means literary “like a bright shining sun” or “like a serene sun”, a line from the traditional song Vazpelo e pile. The comparison in the lyrics of that song is related with the shine of the swords of a group of Bulgarian rebels on the march.

== Musical style and influences ==
Although touring and recording have been sometimes interrupted, the group managed to preserve its characteristic style. The band blends traditional Bulgarian music, mostly from the Rhodopes region, with other mainly Eastern styles. It also draws on folklore of different Balkan countries but brings it closer to modernity. Some of the elements in it also suggest the tradition of countries in the Middle East, along with Church Slavonic motives and Medieval European music.

The drum driven polyrhythm melody line is accompanied by chanting, singing, howling and occasional yelling. Another feature is the nostalgic feeling of searching, somehow out of time and place, rarely in response to man's desires. In this music the quest for a personal truth and realization is revealed and sometimes interpreted as a symbolic journey, a lonely one, intimate, thoroughly lived and passionate.

== Discography ==
=== Studio albums ===
- Chakruk (2004)
- Elohim Neva Senzu (2006)
- Elohim Neva Senzu (2007) (extended version, limited edition)
- Requiem for The White Wind (2014)
- Kayno Yesno Slonce (2015, 2-CD)
- Mare Verborum (2017)

== Band members ==
Current members

- Veselin Mitev – lead vocals, bagpipe, kaval, duduk
- Stanislav Stoyanov “Toni Horo” – tupan, zarb, percussion
- Peter Delchev – tambura, hang
- Yulia Uzunova – synthesizers, glockenspiel
- Evgeni Chakalov – flutes, tambura
- Alexey Cvetanov – wavedrum, electronic percussion

Guest musicians

- Pavel Terziiski – vocals
- Vlado Chivlidjanov (Isihia) – duduk, bagpipe
- Kalin Yordanov (Isihia, Irfan) – vocals, daf, bender, darbouka
- Shtoni Kokudev – bagpipe, tupan
- Alexandra Shkodrova (Eriney) – gadulka
- Magdalena Petrovich - cello
