= Isihia =

Bulgarian folk rock band

Isihia Исихия
- Origin: Sofia, Bulgaria
- Years active: 1998–2015
- Label: AveNew Productions
- Spinoffs: Irfan, Kayno Yesno Slonce, Ambient Folklore
- Members: Evgeni Nikolov; Petar Delchev; Veselin Mitev; Panayot Angelov
- Past members: Vlado Chiflidjanov; Tatyana Yossifova; Kalin Yordanov; Marin Genchev; Moni Monchev
- Website: www.isihia.net

Isihia (Bulgarian: Исихия, "hesychia") are a Bulgarian folk rock music band founded in 2000, the style of which unites elements of Bulgarian folklore and Hesychast Christian chant of the 14th century to create an atmosphere of Balkan spiritual mysticism. Many of the group's songs cover topics of the medieval history of Bulgaria, mostly the period of the Ottoman invasion of the Balkans and the attempts on its repulsion and the early Ottoman rule of Bulgaria, i.e. the 14th-15th century, but also other moments of hardship such as the tragic Battle of Klyuch of 1014.

== Members ==
The band has four members:

- Evgeni Nikolov (lead vocals)
- Veselin Mitev (vocals, kaval, gaida, duduk; later performing with Kayno Yesno Slonce)
- Petar Delchev (tambura, cello-tambura; later performing with Kayno Yesno Slonce)
- Panayot Angelov (percussions)

== Former members ==
- Marin Genchev (took part in Isihia album recordings)
- Kalin Yordanov (took part in Isihia album recording; later performing with Irfan)
- Tatyana Yossifova (took part in Isihia and Orisiya album recordings)
- Moni Monchev (took part in Orisiya album recordings)
- Vlado Chiflidjanov (took part in Isihia and Orisiya album records, now a guest musician with the band)

== Albums ==
Isihia have released two separate albums, the eponymous Isihia from 2001 and Orisiya ("Doom") that was used as the music of Neshka Robeva's dance show by the same name, and the double-CD Stihiri/Otkrovenia (Sticherons/Revelations). A compilation of Isihia music also served as the soundtrack of the 2000 film Isihia by the Bulgarian National Television. In addition, the band's eponymous album was re-released by the Austrian company Polyglobe Music with song titles in English and an additional track.

=== Isihia (2001) track listing ===
1. "Preobrazhenie (Transfiguration)"
2. "Gospodi Vozvah (Lord, I have cried unto Thee)"
3. "Tzaryat Fruzhin"
4. "Chernomen"
5. "1393"
6. "Vetre" (Wind)
7. "Saruyar"

=== Orisiya (2003) track listing ===
1. "Klyuch" (named after the village of Klyuch)
2. "Rodopa"
3. "Ugar"
4. "Kosti" (named after the village of Kosti, where fire dance festivities take place)
5. "Turkish Dance"
6. "The Curse"
7. "Chakrak"
8. "Introduction"
9. "Aramii"
10. "Gospodi Vozvah" (God, I Called Thee)
11. "Vetre" (Wind)

=== Stihiri / Otkrovenia (2010) track listing ===
CD 1 - Stihiri

1. "Ipostas" (Hypostasis)
2. "Anahoret"
3. "Katizma" (Kathisma)
4. "Vreme Razdelno" (Time Of Separation)
5. "Za Vyarata na Shishmana" (For The Faith Of Tsar Ivan Shishman)
6. "Bdenie" (Vigil)
7. "S Bogom" (Go With God)

CD 2 - Otkrovenia (Revelations)

1. "Otkrovenie 1"
2. "Otkrovenie 2"
3. "Otkrovenie 3"
4. "Otkrovenie 4"
5. "Otkrovenie 5"
6. "Otkrovenie 6"
7. "Otkrovenie 7"
8. "Otkrovenie 8"
9. "Otkrovenie 9"
10. "Otkrovenie 10"
11. "Otkrovenie 11"
12. "Otkrovenie 12"
13. "Otkrovenie 13"
14. "Otkrovenie 14"

=== Singles ===
The single "For The Faith of Shishman" has been published on 6.May.2009 St. George's day (also day of the Bulgarian Army). The single was published in electronic form only, via M-Tel's Vodafone live! portal.
