= 2002 FIG Rhythmic Gymnastics World Cup Final =

International rhythmic gymnastics competition

The 2002 FIG Rhythmic Gymnastics World Cup Final was the fifth edition of the Rhythmic Gymnastics World Cup Final, held from November 30 to December 2, 2002, in Stuttgart, Germany. The competition was officially organized by the International Gymnastics Federation as the last stage of a series of competitions through the 2001–2002 season.

== Medalists ==
Event	Gold	Silver	Bronze	Ref.
Rope	(Ukraine) Anna Bessonova	(Bulgaria) Simona Peycheva	(Russia) Vera Sessina	
Hoop	(Ukraine) Anna Bessonova	(Russia) Zarina Gizikova	(Ukraine) Tamara Yerofeeva	
Ball	(Bulgaria) Simona Peycheva	(Ukraine) Anna Bessonova	(Ukraine) Tamara Yerofeeva	
Clubs	(Ukraine) Anna Bessonova	(Bulgaria) Simona Peycheva	(Ukraine) Tamara Yerofeeva	

== Medal table ==
Rank	Nation	Gold	Silver	Bronze	Total
1	Ukraine (UKR)	3	1	3	7
2	Bulgaria (BUL)	1	2	0	3
3	Russia (RUS)	0	1	1	2
Totals (3 entries)		4	4	4	12

== See also ==
- 2002 Rhythmic Gymnastics Grand Prix circuit
