= Mojca Rode =

Slovenian rhythmic gymnast

- Born: 5 June 1983 (age 43) Ljubljana, Slovenia, Yugoslavia

Gymnastics career
- Discipline: Rhythmic gymnastics
- Country represented: Slovenia
- Club: KŠRG Šiška, GD Vrhnika
- Head coach: Marieta Stoimenova
- Retired: 2013
Medal record
Representing Slovenia
Rhythmic gymnastics
National Championships
Gold medal – first place	2003 Ljubljana	All-Around
Gold medal – first place	2004 Ljubljana	All-Around
Gold medal – first place	2007 Ljubljana	All-Around
Gold medal – first place	2008 Ljubljana	All-Around
Gold medal – first place	2009 Ljubljana	All-Around
Silver medal – second place	2001 Ljubljana	All-Around

Mojca Rode (born 6 June 1983) is a Slovenian rhythmic gymnast who competed both as an individual and group member. She is a five-time (2003, 2004, 2007–2009) Slovenian National all-around champion. She now works as a coach and a judge.

== Career ==
Rode began rhythmic gymnastics when she was five, after a coach visited her kindergarten to scout for flexible children. She was selected and enjoyed watching the ribbons when rhythmic gymnastics was on television, so she began training. As a gymnast, her favorite gymnasts were Anna Bessonova, Simona Peycheva, and Alexandra Orlando.

She was a part of the Slovenian senior group which competed at the 1999 European Championships in Budapest and placed 8th in the 10 clubs final. Later that year, they finished in 16th place in the group all-around at the 1999 World Championships in Osaka, Japan.

In 2000, she started competing as an individual gymnast again. She and her teammates Dušica Jeremič and Tina Čas placed 13th in the team competition at the 2001 World Championships in Madrid, Spain. She also qualified to the individual all-around final, where she ended in 20th place, behind Eleni Andriola from Greece.

In 2001, she competed at the 2001 World Games in Akita, Japan, where she finished in 8th place in the hoop final. She won the silver medal in all-around at the 2001 Slovenian National Championships behind Dušica Jeremič.

In 2003, Rode won the gold medal in the all-around and all four apparatus finals at the Slovenian National Championships. She competed at the 2003 Summer Universiade in Daegu, South Korea and qualified to the clubs final, where she finished in 6th place. She then competed at the 2003 World Championships in Budapest, where she finished her season.

At the 2006 European Championships, she finished in 14th place in the all-around.

Beginning in June 2007, she received a one-year contract from the Slovenian ministry to work as a professional athlete. She hoped to qualify for the 2008 Summer Olympics at the 2007 World Championships, but she was unable to do so. Rode said that "I wanted to do too much" and that she wanted to go to the Olympics with her boyfriend Mitja Petkovšek, which made her nervous when she competed and led to her making mistakes.

Rode placed 23rd in the all-around final at the 2009 World Championships.

After initially retiring in 2009, she made a comeback in 2013 after having two children. Her last competition, at the age of 30, was the 2013 World Championships in Kyiv. She finished in 59th place in the all-around qualifications.

== Post-competitive career ==
Rode now leads a rhythmic gymnastics club, which she founded in 2014 with her partner, Petkovšek, and has trained as an international judge. She has stated that she began her own club so that she could take a different approach to coaching rhythmic gymnastics than what she considered to be typical, including allowing gymnasts to begin elite training at a later age, encouraging children to participate in lower and recreational levels of the sport, and taking prompt action when she or the other coaches suspect a gymnasts is developing an eating disorder.

== Personal life ==
She is in a relationship with Slovenian gymnast Mitja Petkovšek, with whom she has two daughters, Gaja and Asja. She studied primary school education at university, which she graduated from in 2007.
