= Laura Zacchilli =

Italian rhythmic gymnast (born 1980)

- Born: 2 October 1980 (age 45)

Gymnastics career
- Discipline: Rhythmic gymnastics
- Country represented: Italy (1999-2004 (?))

Laura Zacchilli (born 2 October 1980) is an Italian individual rhythmic gymnast. She represents her nation at international competitions.

She participated at the 2004 Summer Olympics in Athens. She also competed at world championships, including at the 1999, 2001 and 2003 World Rhythmic Gymnastics Championships.
