= Simona Peycheva =

Bulgarian rhythmic gymnast (born 1985)

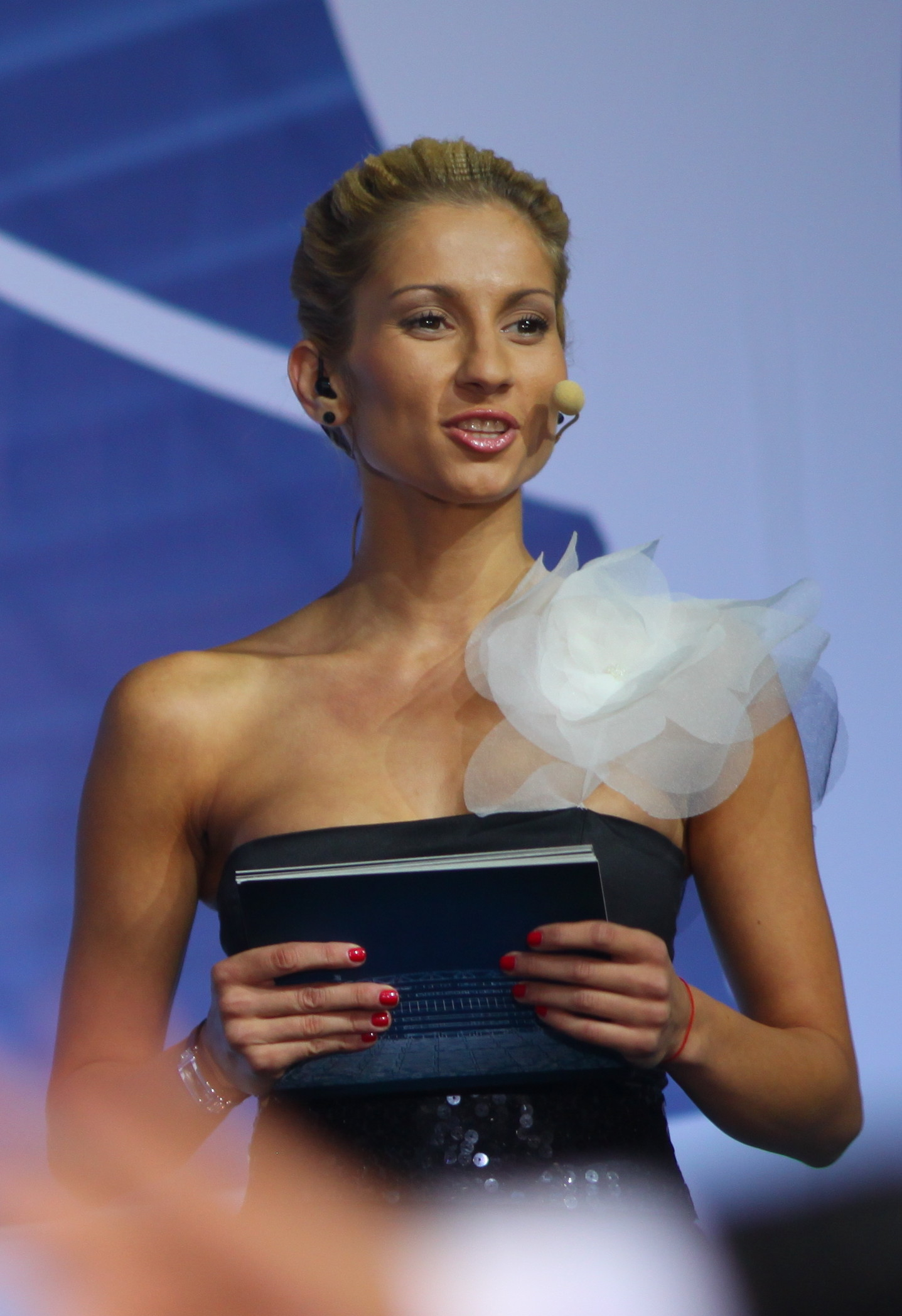

Personal information
- Born: 14 May 1985 (age 41)

Gymnastics career
- Discipline: Rhythmic gymnastics
- Country represented: Bulgaria
Medal record
Representing Bulgaria
World Championships
Gold medal – first place	2001 Madrid	Hoop
Gold medal – first place	2001 Madrid	Ball
Gold medal – first place	2001 Madrid	Clubs
Silver medal – second place	2001 Madrid	All-Around
Silver medal – second place	2001 Madrid	Rope
Bronze medal – third place	2001 Madrid	Team
European Championships
Bronze medal – third place	2002 Granada	Team
Bronze medal – third place	2003 Riesa	Clubs
World Cup Final
Gold medal – first place	2002 Stuttgart	Ball
Gold medal – first place	2002 Stuttgart	Clubs
Silver medal – second place	2002 Stuttgart	Rope
Silver medal – second place	2004 Moscow	Hoop
Silver medal – second place	2004 Moscow	Ribbon
Grand Prix Final
Gold medal – first place	2002 Innsbruck	Rope
Silver medal – second place	2002 Innsbruck	Clubs
Bronze medal – third place	2001 Deventer	Rope
Goodwill Games
Gold medal – first place	2001 Brisbane	All-around
Gold medal – first place	2001 Brisbane	Rope
Gold medal – first place	2001 Brisbane	Hoop
Gold medal – first place	2001 Brisbane	Ball
Silver medal – second place	2001 Brisbane	Clubs

Simona Peycheva (Bulgarian: Симона Пейчева, born 14 May 1985, in Sofia) is a rhythmic gymnast who represented Bulgaria at the 2004 and 2008 Olympics. She is the 2001 World Championships all-around silver medalist and a World champion with hoop, ball and clubs as well as a Bulgarian national champion. She now works as a television host and a coach.

== Personal life ==
Peycheva has a son born in 2009 named Alexei.

== Career ==
Peycheva began artistic gymnastics in kindergarten after being selected by a coach. She later switched to rhythmic gymnastics and began training with Marieta Dukova. In 2000, she won the Bulgarian senior all-around title.

In 2001, she won bronze at the 2001 Goodwill Games behind Irina Tchachina and Alina Kabaeva. After Tchachina and Kabaeva were stripped of their placements at the 2001 World Championships for positive doping tests, Peycheva won a total of six medals there: three gold (hoop, ball, and clubs), two silver (all-around and rope), and one bronze (team). She received a good reaction from the crowd, which Peycheva attributed to Bulgarian gymnastics emphasizing musicality and emotions when creating routines.

Peycheva competed on the Rhythmic Gymnastics Grand Prix in 2002 and won silver in rope and bronze in hoop and clubs at the Moscow stage. She also won three more bronze medals at the World Cup also held in Moscow. Although Peycheva broke her foot in June, she continued to compete. That November, she won bronze in the all-around at the Grand Prix held in Holon. Later in the month, she won two gold medals in ball and clubs and a silver in rope at the World Cup Final in Stuttgart.

The next year, she competed at the 2003 European Championships, where she won bronze with clubs. She tested positive for diuretics in an out-of-competition doping test and withdrew from the 2003 World Championships. A new medal ceremony was held there for the medals being redistributed from the 2001 World Championships, but Peycheva declined to participate, although she was present. She did not feel comfortable receiving the new gold medals, and she gave one to Tchachina, returned one to Kabaeva, and kept one for herself. In November, she had surgery on her foot, which required a bone graft.

At the 2004 Olympics in Athens, she placed 6th in the final with a total score of 101.050. Peycheva dropped her ribbon, but she said of her performance, "I think that even if my program was perfect I would have been in the same position in the final ranking."

Peycheva stopped training for three months in 2005 and planned to retire. However, her coach, Dukova, persuaded her to return.

Peycheva began to suffer severe back pain before the 2007 World Championships; although she received painkillers, she could not train for a week before the competition due to the pain. Afterward, she went to Germany for surgery on her spine.

At the 2008 Olympics in Beijing, she finished 10th. It was her last competition, and she officially ended her career in December.

After her retirement from competition, Peycheva began a career as a television host. She briefly returned to competing in 2013 and won an internal control training, although she had conflicts with the Bulgarian federation. In early 2014, she announced her second retirement. Peycheva also founded her own gymnastics club in 2009, where she coaches, and began to run the "Simona Cup" in 2010.

== Olympic results ==
Olympic Games	Apparatus	Score (final)	Score (qualifying)	Music
Athens 2004	Ribbon	24.400	23.725	Navras (Don Davis & Juno Reactor)
Athens 2004	Ball	25.675	24.800	Prokliatieto (Isihia)
Athens 2004	Hoop	25.375	25.475	Handel's Sarabande (Maksim Mrvica)
Athens 2004	Clubs	25.600	24.700	
Athens 2004	All-around	101.050	98.700	
Beijing 2008	Ribbon	15.750	16.675	Overture (Andrew Lloyd Webber)
Beijing 2008	Rope	15.975	16.900	Berlin Foot Chase (John Powell)
Beijing 2008	Hoop	16.975	17.125	Summertime (Rick Wakeman)
Beijing 2008	Clubs	16.775	16.475	Korana (Balkanika)
Beijing 2008	All-around	65.475	67.175	
