= Olga Karmansky =

American rhythmic gymnast (born 1986)

- Born: July 1, 1986 (age 40)

Gymnastics career
- Discipline: Rhythmic gymnastics
- Country represented: United States (2001-2005 (?))

Olga Karmansky (born July 1, 1986) is an American individual rhythmic gymnast. She represents her nation at international competitions. At the 2001 Pan American Gymnastics Championships she won the gold medal in the team all-around, individual all-around and hoop events and the bronze medal in the ball and rope events. Karmansky participated at the 2003 Pan American Games where she won two silver medals, in the individual all-around and ball events. Just like in 2001 she won the gold medal in the team all-around event at the 2005 Pan American Gymnastics Championships, and further the silver medal in the clubs event and the bronze medal in the ball and ribbon events. She competed at world championships, including at the 2005 World Rhythmic Gymnastics Championships.

In 2008, she was one of the 17 American gymnasts on The Tour of Gymnastics Superstars, a nationwide concert tour that showcases the talents of American gymnasts. The tour visited 34 different cities in over twenty states across the continental United States.
