= Jessica Howard =

American rhythmic gymnast

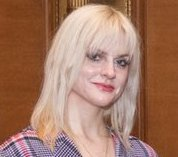
- Howard in 2021

Personal information
- Born: 1984 (age 41–42) Jacksonville, Florida

Gymnastics career
- Discipline: Rhythmic gymnastics
- Country represented: United States (Team USA)
- Head coach: Efrossina Anguelova
- World ranking: Top Ten

Jessica Howard (born 1984) is a retired rhythmic gymnast. Howard is a USA Hall of Fame gymnast, three-time National Champion and international medalist.

== Career ==
Howard started gymnastics when she was three years old, and fell in love with rhythmic gymnastics at age 10. After climbing the international ranks to top 12 in the world during her career, she retired due to injury in 2002. She was part of the national team from 1997 to 2002, and became a 3× National Champion; fifteen-time U.S. Gold Medalist; Goodwill Games Bronze Medalist; Pan American Silver Medalist; Pacific Alliance 4× Gold Medalist; World Games top 10; World Championships finalist and Junior Pan American Champion. She was the USA Gymnastics Rhythmic Athlete of the Year three times. Howard secured her spot for the Olympics when she was named by the FIG to compete in the 2000 Olympic Games, but had her Olympic berth taken at the last minute due to continental rules that were newly implemented for the 2000 Olympics. She was coached by Efrossina Anguelova.

Howard was inducted into the US Gymnastics Hall of Fame in 2015.

== Abuse ==
During her career she was sexually abused during the USA Gymnastics sex abuse scandal. In February 2017, three former gymnasts, Jamie Dantzscher, Jeanette Antolin and Howard, gave an interview with 60 Minutes in which they accused Larry Nassar of sexually abusing them. The gymnasts also alleged that the "emotionally abusive environment" at the national team training camps run by Béla and Márta Károlyi at the Karolyi Ranch gave Nassar an opportunity to take advantage of the gymnasts and made them afraid to speak up about the abuse.
