= Sherin Taama =

Egyptian rhythmic gymnast

- Full name: Arabic: شيرين كرم عبدالمنعم محمد طعمة
- Born: 26 May 1982 (age 44) Alexandria, Egypt
- Height: 165 cm (5 ft 5 in) (at the 2000 Olympics)

Gymnastics career
- Discipline: Rhythmic gymnastics
- Country represented: Egypt
- Club: Sporting, Smouha
- Head coach: Olga Odery
- Assistant coach: Safi karam
- Former coach: Ahmed karam
- Retired: 2002
- World ranking: 40

Sherin Taama (Arabic: شيرين طعمة, born 26 May 1982 in Alexandria), is an Egyptian rhythmic gymnast.

Taama competed for Egypt in the rhythmic gymnastics individual all-around competition at the 2000 Summer Olympics in Sydney. She placed 24th in the qualification round and did not advance to the final.
