= Laura Vernizzi =

Italian rhythmic gymnast (born 1985)

Personal information
- Nationality: Italian
- Born: September 15, 1985 (age 41) Como, Italy
- Height: 1.75 m (5 ft 9 in)
- Weight: 48 kg (106 lb)

Sport
- Country: Italy
- Sport: Rhythmic gymnastics
- Club: SG Comense
- Coached by: Emanuela Maccarani
Medal record
Olympic Games
| Silver medal – second place | 2004 Athens | Group all-around |
World Championships
| Gold medal – first place | 2005 Baku | 3 Hoops / 4 Clubs |
| Silver medal – second place | 2005 Baku | Group All-around |
| Silver medal – second place | 2005 Baku | 5 Ribbons |

Laura Vernizzi (born 15 September 1985 in Como) is a former Italian rhythmic gymnast.

== Biography ==
She won the silver medal in the competition of rhythmic gymnastics group at Athens Olympics in 2004.

== Olympic results ==
| Year | Competition | Venue | Position | Event | Score |
|---|---|---|---|---|---|
| 2004 | Olympic Games | (Greece) Athens | 2nd | Group all-around | 49.450 |

== Honours ==

Officer: Ufficiale Ordine al Merito della Repubblica Italiana: 27 September 2004

== See also ==
- Italy at the 2004 Summer Olympics - Medalists
