= Lyasan Utiasheva =

Russian gymnast (born 1985)

- Ляйсан Утяшева
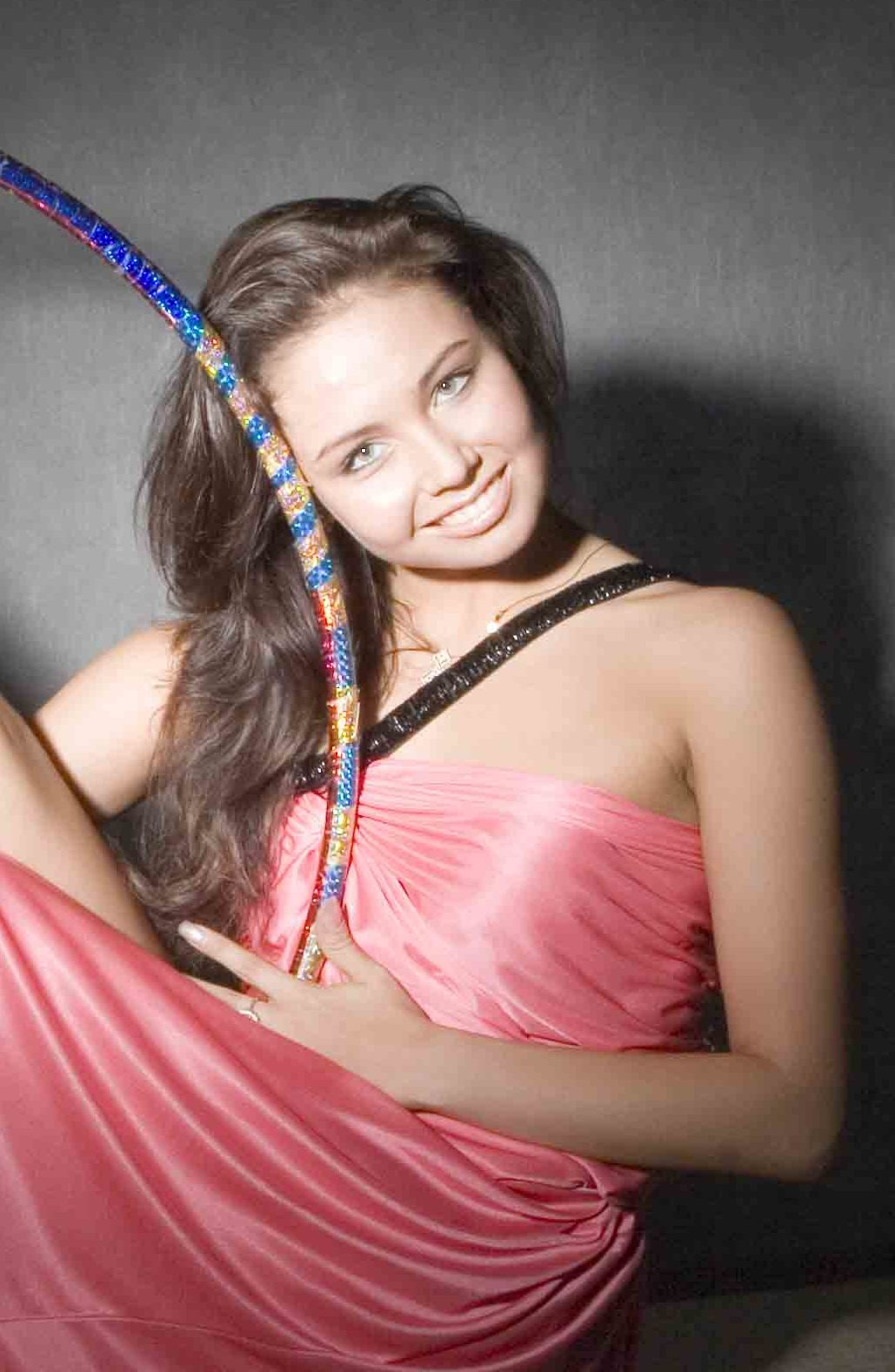
- Utiasheva in 2006

Personal information
- Full name: Lyasan Albertovna Utiasheva
- Born: 28 June 1985 (age 41) Rayevskiy, Bashkir ASSR, Soviet Union
- Height: 167 cm (5 ft 6 in)

Gymnastics career
- Discipline: Rhythmic gymnastics
- Country represented: (1993)
- Head coach: Irina Viner
- Assistant coach: Vera Shatalina
- Former coaches: Oxana Skaldina, Alla Yanina
- Choreographer: N. Kosinova
- Eponymous skills: The Utyasheva — backsplit to backscale to backsplit pivot with help
- Retired: 2006
Medal record
Representing Russia
World Championships
Disqualified	2001 Madrid	Team
European Championships
Gold medal – first place	2004 Kyiv	Team
Gold medal – first place	2002 Granada	Team
Grand Prix Final
Gold medal – first place	2001 Deventer	Rope
Gold medal – first place	2001 Deventer	Clubs
Silver medal – second place	2001 Deventer	All-around
Silver medal – second place	2001 Deventer	Hoop
Silver medal – second place	2001 Deventer	Ball
Bronze medal – third place	2002 Innsbruck	All-around
World Games
Silver medal – second place	2001 Akita	Hoop
Silver medal – second place	2001 Akita	Rope
Silver medal – second place	2001 Akita	Ball
Silver medal – second place	2001 Akita	Clubs

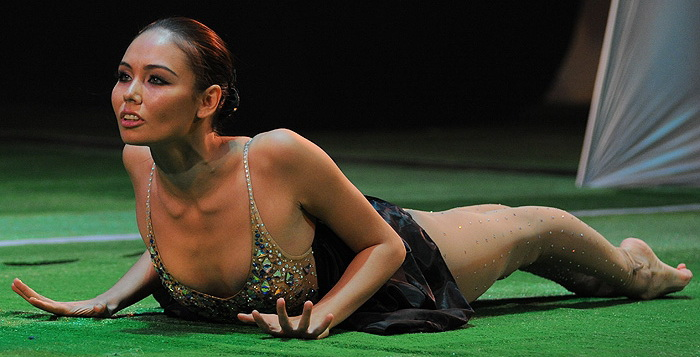
Utiasheva in a gala performance

Lyasan Albertovna Utiasheva (alt. sp.: Liasan Outiacheva; Russian: Ляйсан Альбертовна Утяшева; Bashkir: Ләйсән Альберт ҡыҙы Үтәшева; born 28 June 1985) is a Russian socialite, television host, and former individual rhythmic gymnast. She is a two-time Grand Prix Final all-around medalist, and was an ambassador of the 2018 FIFA World Cup. Utiasheva was known for her extreme flexibility, her emphasis in point of landing on high relevé in her backsplit pivots led to a career ending injury.

== Career ==
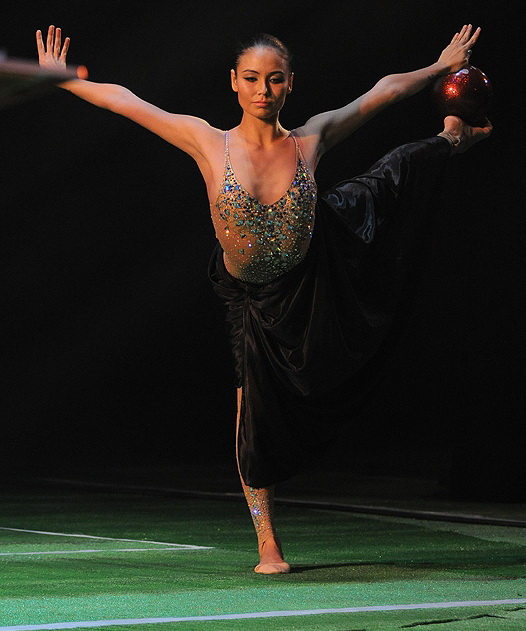
Utiasheva in a gala show

Utiasheva's first coach was Alla Yanina. Irina Viner invited both Utiasheva and her coach to join the Olympic Centre in Moscow, but it was only Utiasheva who moved.

Utiasheva's breakthrough came in 2001 when she placed third at the Russian Championships. She then competed at the 2001 World Cup in Berlin and won gold medals in All-around and the individual apparatus finals in clubs, ball, rope and hoop. At the 2001 World Games in Akita, Japan, Utiasheva won four silver medals behind teammate Irina Tchachina in event finals for rope, hoop, ball and clubs. Utiasheva won the all-around silver medal at the 2001 Grand Prix Final in Deventer, she also won 2 gold medals in the apparatus finals in clubs and rope. She was a member of the Russian team that won gold at the 2001 World Championships in Madrid but they were later disqualified due to Alina Kabaeva and Irina Tchachina testing positive for a banned diuretic.

In September 2002, Utiasheva hurt her foot on a bad landing while training in Samara but the X-ray revealed no fracture so she continued training and competing for the next eight months. At the 2002 Grand Prix Final in Innsbruck, Utiasheva felt pain in her feet after her ringjump and withdrew from the competition after the hoop final. At a specialist clinic in Berlin, magnetic resonance tomography showed that the navicular bone of both her feet had numerous fractures. She underwent surgery and returned to the sport briefly in 2004 but, unable to perform her jumps, she retired from competition and completed her career in 2006.

Utiasheva continued performing in galas and also began coaching. She starred in Alexei Nemov's 2007 show with other rhythmic stars including Yulia Barsukova. She was also one of the judges at the 2012, 2014, 2016, and 2017 Miss Russia pageants.

== Personal life ==
Lyasan Utiasheva was born to a Bashkir mother named Zulfiya Utyasheva, and a father of mixed Russian, Polish, and Volga Tatar descent named Albert Utyashev. She converted to Orthodox Christianity from Islam. She married Russian actor and comedian Pavel Volya, with whom she has a son, Robert, born in Miami, Florida. She gave birth to a daughter, Sofiya, in Summer 2015.

== Routine music information ==
Year	Apparatus	Music title
2005	Hoop	Trisha / Carson City / Battle in the Boneyard music from Con Air by Mark Mancina
2005	Ball	Full Moon and the Shrine by Keiko Matsui
2005	Clubs	Obicham Ludo by Malina
2005	Rope	El Tango De Roxanne music from Moulin Rouge! by Ewan McGregor, Jose Feliciano, Jacek Koman
2004	Hoop	Trisha / Carson City / Battle in the Boneyard music from Con Air by Mark Mancina
2004	Ball	Full Moon and the Shrine by Keiko Matsui
2004	Clubs	Oh Yeah by Yello
2004	Ribbon	Summertime music from Porgy and Bess by George Gershwin
2002	Hoop	Gypsy Dance music from Don Quixote by Leon Minkus
2002	Ball	Für Elise by Ludwig van Beethoven
2002	Clubs	A Gusta / Journey to Shambala / Hindi Sad Diamonds by Safri Duo / Oliver Shanti / Nicole Kidman, John Leguizamo, Alka Ya
2002	Rope	Straight to Number One / Big Beat / Tango in Harlem by Touch and Go
2001	Hoop	Nirbandh by Eastern Voices
2001	Ball	Act II: Un bel di vedremo (Butterfly) music from Madama Butterfly by Giacomo Puccini
2001	Clubs	Kismet by Bond
2001	Rope	Keys to Imagination by Yanni
2000	Hoop	It Ain't Necessarily So / I've Got Rhythm by George Gershwin / Benjamin Goodman
2000	Ball	Norwegian Mountains / Reflection / The Heat by Oystein Sevag / Peter Gabriel
2000	Rope	Fantasia de Asturias by Isaac Manuel Francisco Albeniz
2000	Ribbon	Keys to Imagination by Yanni
