= Mary Sanders =

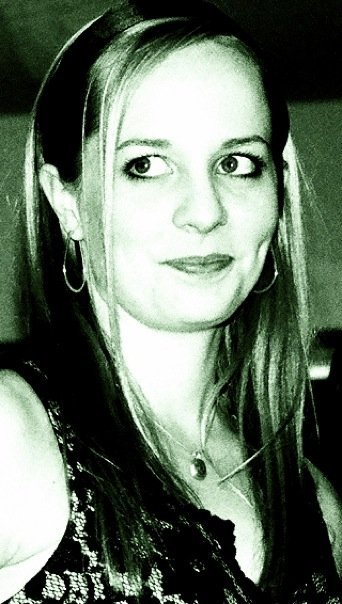

Personal information
- Full name: Mary Sanders
- Nickname: Marebear
- Born: August 26, 1985 (age 41) Toronto, Ontario

Gymnastics career
- Discipline: Rhythmic gymnastics
- Country represented: United States
- Former countries represented: Canada
Medal record
Rhythmic gymnastics
Representing Canada
Four Continents Championships
Gold medal – first place	2001 Curitiba	All-around
Representing the United States
Pan American Games
Gold medal – first place	2003 Santo Domingo	All-around
Gold medal – first place	2003 Santo Domingo	Hoops
Gold medal – first place	2003 Santo Domingo	Ball
Gold medal – first place	2003 Santo Domingo	Clubs
Gold medal – first place	2003 Santo Domingo	Ribbon

Mary Sanders (born 26 August 1985 in Toronto, Ontario) is an American individual Rhythmic Gymnast. Mary holds dual citizenship of both the United States and Canada, as her father was American and her mother is Canadian. She began her career representing Canada but began to compete for the USA in late 2002. Sanders is a two-time Canadian Rhythmic Gymnastics Champion and three-time U.S.A. Rhythmic Gymnastics Champion, 4 Continents Champion, 2 time Pan American Champion and earned the title of one of the most successful Rhythmic gymnast in the Western Hemisphere, alongside Laura Zeng and Evita Griskenas

== Career ==
Sanders had her highest placement finishing 10th in all-around at the 2003 World Championships.

Sanders represented America in the 2004 Olympics in Athens, placing 15th in the qualifying round. She has since retired from rhythmic gymnastics and is employed by Cirque du Soleil. Sanders performs on a freelance basis within the Special Events department of Cirque Du Soleil, but has previously toured full-time with Corteo and Delirium. Sanders is also a creative collaborator and Spokesperson for the Reebok and Cirque du Soleil JUKARI program. More recently, Sanders was one of the Creative Directors for the 2012 Kellogg’s Tour of Gymnastics Champions.

As a Rhythmic Gymnast, Sanders has ranked higher at the World Rhythmic Gymnastics Championships and Olympics than any competitor from the Western Hemisphere in history, until Laura Zeng's performance at the 2015 World Championships.

Sanders was chosen for induction into the USA Gymnastics Hall of Fame in 2009.

== See also ==
- Nationality changes in gymnastics
