= Esther Domínguez =

Spanish rhythmic gymnast

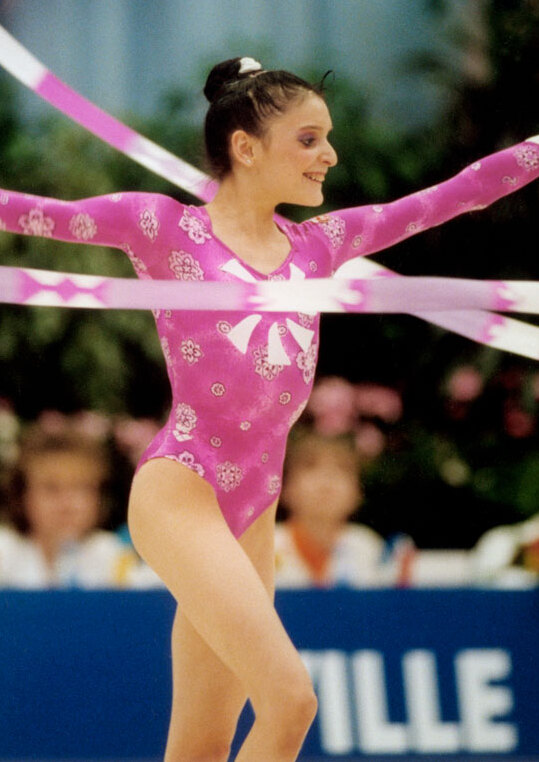
- Esther Dominguez at the Corbeil-Essonnes tournament 17 May 1998

Personal information
- Full name: Esther Domínguez Zurita
- Born: 23 April 1981 (age 45) Zaragoza, Province of Zaragoza, Spain
- Height: 158 cm (5 ft 2 in) (at the 2000 Olympics)

Gymnastics career
- Discipline: Rhythmic gymnastics
- Country represented: Spain
- Club: CEGR Zaragoza
Medal record
Representing Spain
European Team Gymnastics Championships
Bronze medal – third place	2001 Riesa	Team

Esther Domínguez (23 April 1981, Zaragoza, Province of Zaragoza) is a Spanish former individual rhythmic gymnast. She is a three-time Spanish senior champion and competed in the rhythmic gymnastics individual competition at the 2000 Summer Olympics in Sydney.

== Career ==
Domínguez began rhythmic gymnastics at age 7.

=== Junior ===
Domínguez was the Aragon champion from 1991 to 1993 in the infantil (children's) category, then again in 1994 in the junior category. In 1993, she competed at the Spanish championships in the infantil category and won the all-around as well as rope, hoop, and ball finals. The next year, she won the Spanish all-around junior title as well as the hoop and ribbon finals.

In 1995, she won all four Spanish junior apparatus finals. That July, she competed at the European Junior Championships, where she was 6th in the all-around and competed in two apparatus finals. She moved to Madrid to train with the national team.

=== Senior ===
Domínguez was an alternate for the 1996 Summer Olympics. The next year, she competed at the 1997 World Championships, where she advanced to the all-around final and placed 24th.

She became the Spanish senior champion in 1998 and placed 11th in the all-around at the European Championships. The next year, she won a second consecutive Spanish championships. She placed 9th at the 1999 World Championships.

She won her third Spanish title in 2000. In June, the European Championships were held in her hometown of Zaragoza. Domínguez finished 13th in the all-around and qualified to all four apparatus finals. In September, she competed at the 2000 Summer Olympics. There she was 11th in the qualification round and did not advance to the final of 10 competitors. Afterward, she was without a coach for several months.

In May 2001, Domínguez competed at the European Team Gymnastics Championships; this competition was unique in combining men's and women's artistic gymnasts with rhythmic gymnasts to form a team. The Spanish team won bronze.

Domínguez had a misdiagnosis for a broken rib before the 2001 European Championships in June. She still competed; there was no all-around, but her best result was 8th in the hoop event. In August, she competed at the 2001 World Games, which also had no all-around event. She qualified to the finals on all four apparatuses, with her best result being 5th with rope.

Domínguez retired at the end of 2001, and she said that she did so "more out of psychological than physical exhaustion".

== Post-gymnastics career ==
Domínguez studied journalism. She teaches in multiple schools in Madrid.
