= Elena Tkachenko =

Belarusian rhythmic gymnast

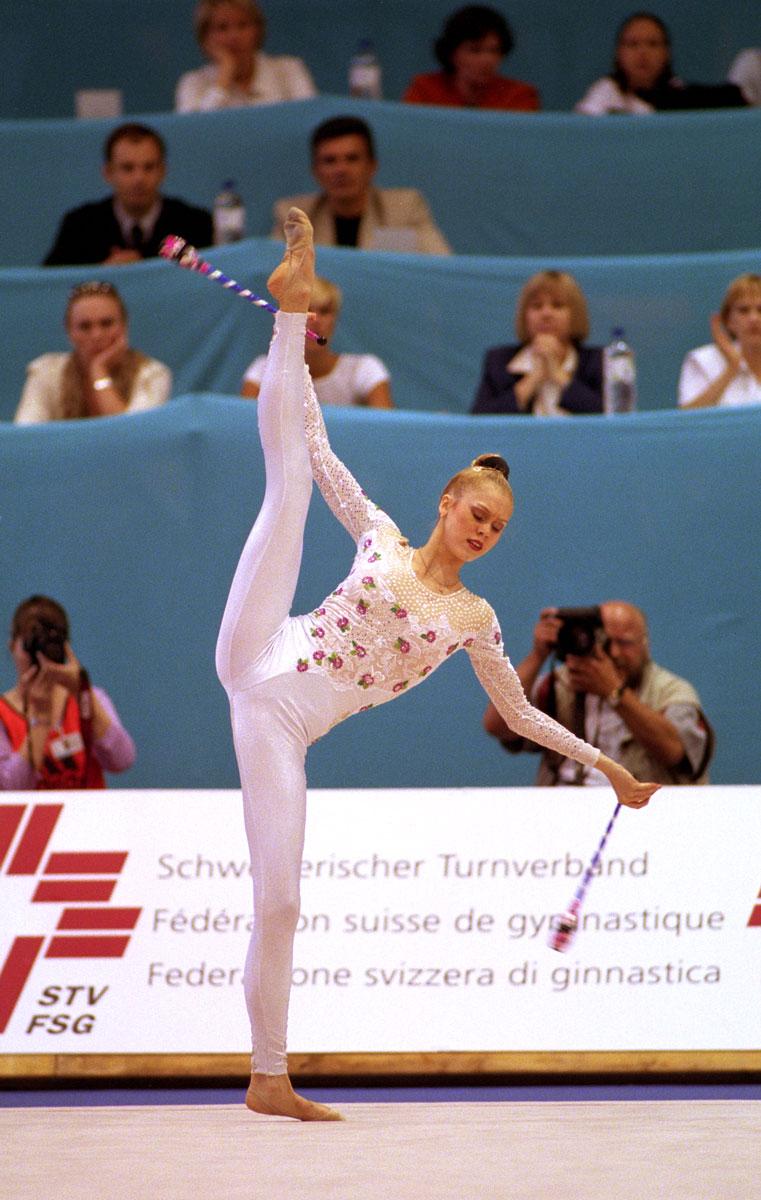

Personal information
- Born: 31 July 1983 (age 43) Sevastopol, Ukraine SSR

Gymnastics career
- Discipline: Rhythmic gymnastics
- Country represented: Belarus
- Former countries represented: Ukraine
- Head coach: Irina Leparskaya
- Retired: 2002
Medal record
Representing Belarus
Rhythmic Gymnastics
World Championships
Silver medal – second place	2001 Madrid	Clubs
Silver medal – second place	2001 Madrid	Team
Bronze medal – third place	1999 Osaka	Team
European Championships
Silver medal – second place	2000 Zaragoza	Team
Bronze medal – third place	2001 Geneva	Rope
Bronze medal – third place	2001 Geneva	Ball
World Games
Bronze medal – third place	2001 Akita	Rope
Bronze medal – third place	2001 Akita	Hoop
Bronze medal – third place	2001 Akita	Ball
Bronze medal – third place	2001 Akita	Clubs

Elena Tkachenko (born 31 July 1983 in Sevastopol, Ukraine) is an Individual Rhythmic Gymnast who competed for Belarus.

== Career ==
Tkachenko started doing gymnastics in Sevastopol at age 8 years old, which is by some standards is considered late for rhythmic gymnastics development. At 10 years old, she and her family moved to Simferopol where she met her first coach Liubov Serebrianskaya.

When she turned 16, she got an opportunity to move to Belarus through the idea appeared after the conversations between Liubov Serebrianskaya and Belarus Head coach Irina Leparskaya. Tkachenko has said "I couldn't show my talent on my homeland. On National competitions I took 13-15 places and when I went to international competitions, I was often higher than other Ukrainian girls. So when I was asked if I want to move to Minsk, I said with no doubts : "Yes!".

Tkachenko's move to Belarus changed her rankings dramatically within a year she became No.3 gymnast in Belarus and No.2 after the retirement of Lera Vatkina. She began competing in more international competitions and with the year 2001 becoming her most successful season winning silver in clubs at the 2001 World Championships in Madrid and 4 bronze medals at the 2001 World Games in Akita, Japan. Tkachenko completed her career in 2002 season.
