= Irina Tchachina =

Russian rhythmic gymnast (born 1982)

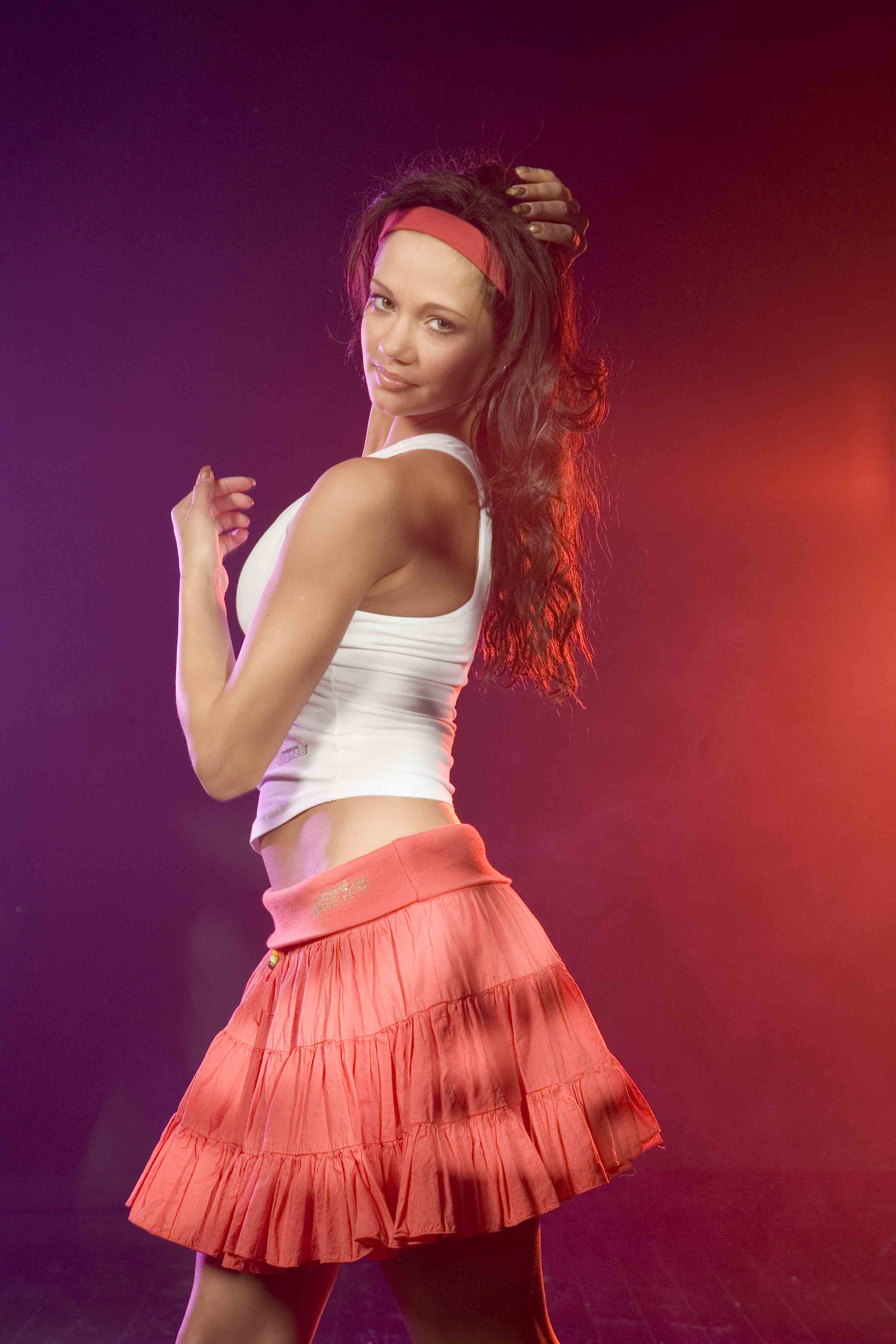
- Tchachina in 2006

Personal information
- Full name: Irina Viktorovna Tchachina
- Alternative name: Irina Chashchina
- Born: 24 April 1982 (age 44) Omsk, Soviet Union
- Height: 166 cm (5 ft 5 in)

Gymnastics career
- Discipline: Rhythmic gymnastics
- Country represented: Russia
- Head coach: Irina Viner
- Assistant coach: Vera Shtelbaums
- Choreographer: Elena Arays
- Eponymous skills: switch leap with changing legs; reverse illusion turns
- Retired: 2006
Medal record
International gymnastics competitions
Event	1st	2nd	3rd
Olympic Games	0	1	0
World Championships	3	1	5
European Championships	6	3	2
European Team Championships	2	0	0
World Cup Final	2	1	0
Grand Prix Final	0	2	2
World Games	4	0	0
Summer Universiade	4	3	1
Total	21	11	10
Rhythmic Gymnastics
Representing Russia
Olympic Games
Silver medal – second place	2004 Athens	All-Around
World Championships
Gold medal – first place	1999 Osaka	Team
Gold medal – first place	2003 Budapest	Team
Gold medal – first place	2005 Baku	Team
Silver medal – second place	2003 Budapest	Clubs
Bronze medal – third place	2003 Budapest	All-around
Bronze medal – third place	2003 Budapest	Hoop
Bronze medal – third place	2005 Baku	All-around
Bronze medal – third place	2005 Baku	Rope
Bronze medal – third place	2005 Baku	Clubs
Disqualified	2001 Madrid	All-around
Disqualified	2001 Madrid	Hoop
Disqualified	2001 Madrid	Rope
Disqualified	2001 Madrid	Ball
Disqualified	2001 Madrid	Clubs
Disqualified	2001 Madrid	Team
European Championships
Gold medal – first place	2000 Saragoza	Team
Gold medal – first place	2001 Geneva	Rope
Gold medal – first place	2004 Kyiv	Team
Gold medal – first place	2005 Moscow	Rope
Gold medal – first place	2005 Moscow	Clubs
Gold medal – first place	2005 Moscow	Team
Silver medal – second place	2001 Geneva	Hoop
Silver medal – second place	2001 Geneva	Ball
Silver medal – second place	2001 Geneva	Clubs
Bronze medal – third place	1998 Porto	Team
Bronze medal – third place	2004 Kyiv	All-around
European Team Championships
Gold medal – first place	2001 Riesa	Team
Gold medal – first place	2003 Moscow	Team
World Cup Final
Gold medal – first place	2004 Moscow	Ball
Gold medal – first place	2004 Moscow	Clubs
Bronze medal – third place	2000 Glasgow	Rope
Grand Prix Final
Silver medal – second place	2000 Deventer	All-around
Silver medal – second place	2005 Berlin	Rope
Bronze medal – third place	2000 Deventer	Ball
Bronze medal – third place	2000 Deventer	Rope
World Games
Gold medal – first place	2001 Akita	Rope
Gold medal – first place	2001 Akita	Hoop
Gold medal – first place	2001 Akita	Ball
Gold medal – first place	2001 Akita	Clubs
Summer Universiade
Gold medal – first place	2003 Daegu	All-around
Gold medal – first place	2003 Daegu	Hoop
Gold medal – first place	2003 Daegu	Ball
Gold medal – first place	2003 Daegu	Clubs
Silver medal – second place	2003 Daegu	Ribbon
Silver medal – second place	2005 Izmir	All-around
Silver medal – second place	2005 Izmir	Ribbon
Bronze medal – third place	2005 Izmir	Clubs
Goodwill Games
Disqualified	2001 Brisbane	All-around
Disqualified	2001 Brisbane	Ball
Disqualified	2001 Brisbane	Clubs
Disqualified	2001 Brisbane	Rope
Disqualified	2001 Brisbane	Hoop

Irina Viktorovna Tchachina (also transliterated Chashchina or Tchashchina, Russian: Ирина Викторовна Чащина; born 24 April 1982) is a retired Russian individual rhythmic gymnast. She is the 2004 Olympic silver medalist in all-around, a two-time (2003, 2005) World all-around bronze medalist, the 2004 European all-around bronze medalist and 2000 Grand Prix Final all-around silver medalist.

== Personal life ==
Tchachina was born to a Russian family as the eldest of three children. She has a younger brother and sister. In late 2011, Tchachina married Russian businessman Evgeny Arkhipov.

== Skills in rhythmic gymnastics ==
Tchachina was a technical gymnast.

== Competitive career ==
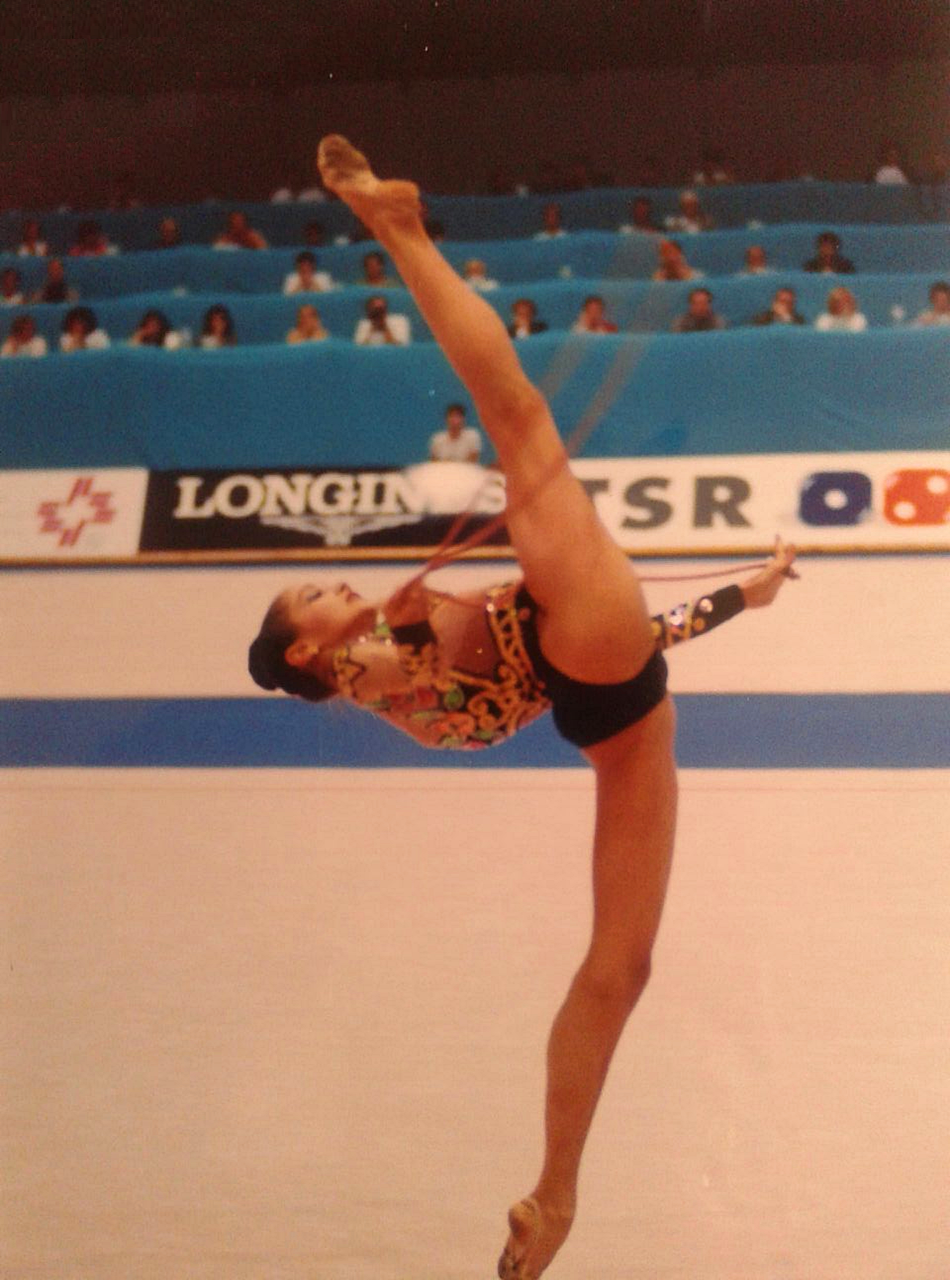
Tchachina at the 2001 European Championships

Tchachina began training at the age of six in her hometown of Omsk (also the hometown of Galima Shugurova, Evgenia Kanaeva, Tatiana Druchinina, Ksenia Dudkina, Sofya Skomorokh). After she became impressed watching the World Rhythmic Gymnastics Championships on television, her grandfather, a devoted amateur sportsman, took her to a sports school. Her early days were filled with music lessons, swimming and rhythmic gymnastics. Faced with a choice at age 11, she chose gymnastics. She was coached by Vera Shtelbaums and her daughter Elena Arais since the age of five. Her favourite gymnasts are Olena Vitrychenko and Yanina Batyrchina.

Tchachina's first victory was at age eight at the Omskaya oblast championship. By age 12 she was a member of Russia's national team and routinely travelled to Moscow to take part in training camps. As a junior, she placed first at the CIS Spatakiada, and won the Russian women's championships twice in a row.

In August 1999, Tchachina began training at the Olympic Preparatory School under the guidance of Irina Viner, and around the same time she won the World Championships in Osaka, Japan. In 2001, she won the gold in the hoop and silver in the individual all-around, ball, clubs and rope at the 2001 World Rhythmic Gymnastics Championships in Madrid, Spain, but Tchachina and her teammate Alina Kabaeva tested positive for a banned diuretic and were stripped of their medals. Irina Viner, the Russian head coach, who also served as the Vice President of the FIG Rhythmic Gymnastics Technical Committee at the time, said her gymnasts had been taking a food supplement called "Hyper" containing mild diuretics, which, according to Viner, the gymnasts were taking for pre-menstrual syndrome. When the supply ran out shortly before the Goodwill Games, the team physiotherapist restocked at a local pharmacy. According to Viner, the supplement sold there was fake and contained furosemide. The commission requested the Goodwill Games organizing committee nullify Kabaeva and Tchachina's results.

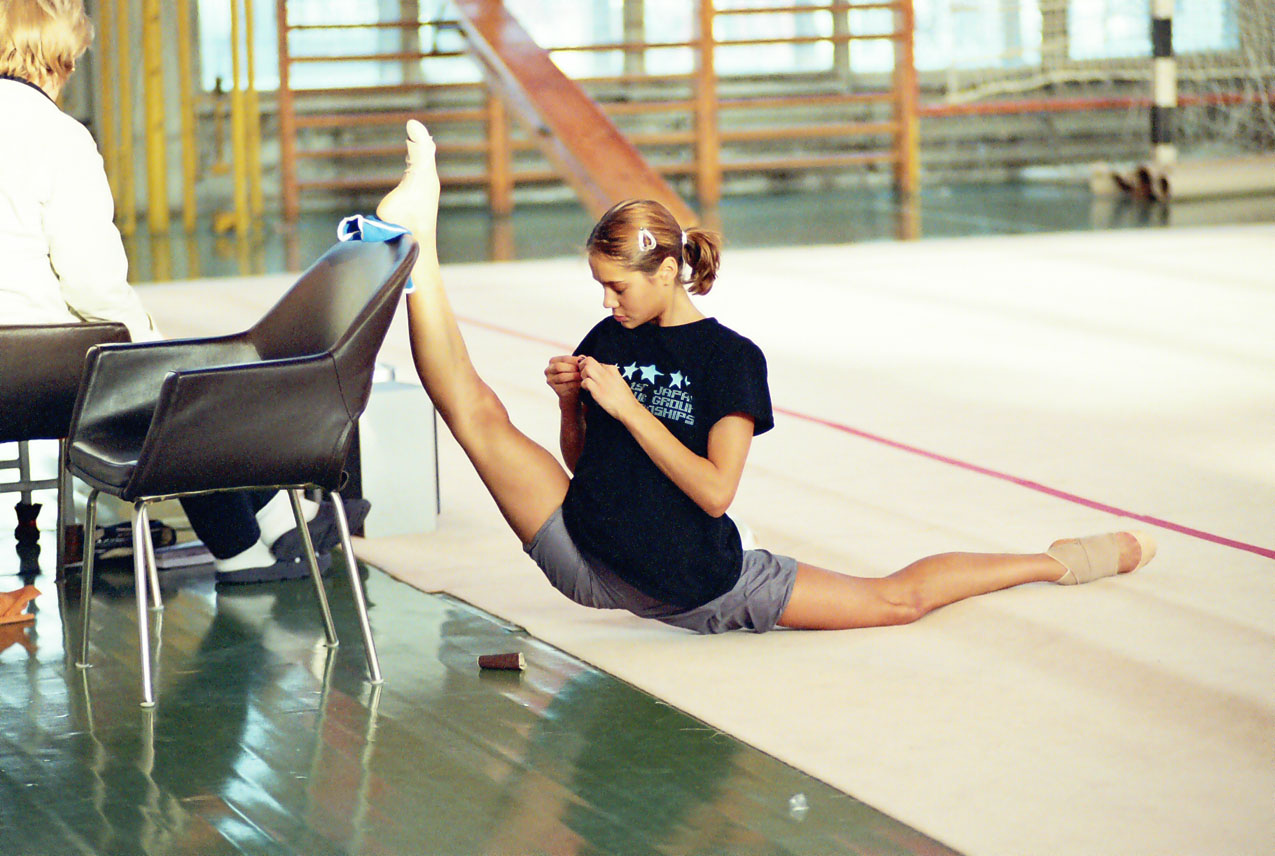
Tchachina stretching during training

In 2003, Tchachina sustained an ankle injury, and dealt with it for two years. The same year she and Kabaeva made their return to competitive gymnastics following their ban. Tchachina won the all-around bronze medal at the 2003 World Championships, silver in clubs and bronze in hoop event finals.

In 2004, Tchachina won the all-around bronze medal at the 2004 European Championships behind Ukraine's Anna Bessonova. At the 2004 Athens Olympics, Tchachina won the silver medal in the all-around competition, scoring 107.325 points (Hoop 27.100, Ball 27.100, Clubs 26.825, Ribbon 26.300) – her teammate Alina Kabaeva took the gold with a score of 108.400.

After the Olympic season, Tchachina experienced a recurring ankle injury. Although no longer in top form, she was still able to win the bronze medal in all-around at the 2005 World Championships and a pair of bronze medals in clubs and rope finals. She retired from rhythmic gymnastics in early 2006.

== Later career ==
After her retirement, Tchachina was invited to the Russian television project "Dances on Ice", partnering with Olympic bronze medalist ice dancer Ruslan Goncharov. She also appeared on the project "Circus with stars" along with other athletes, including Svetlana Khorkina. Tchachina then starred as the lead heroine in the Russian film "The Way" (2009 film) with Artem Mikhalkov. Tchachina wrote an autobiography titled Irina Tchachina: Being Yourself.

On 4 December 2012, at the conference of the Russian Federation of Rhythmic Gymnastics in Novogorsk, Tchachina was elected vice-president of The Russian Rhythmic Gymnastics Federation (RRGF) along with 2008 and 2012 Olympic champion Evgenia Kanaeva. Tchachina was recommended by Irina Viner for the position of President of the Russian Rhythmic Gymnastics Federation (RRGF) but she declined.

In May 2013, Tchachina opened up her rhythmic gymnastics school named after her in Barnaul, Altai Krai. The opening ceremony was attended by other rhythmic gymnasts Liubov Charkashyna, Natalia Godunko and Olga Kapranova.

On 15 February 2015, a star-studded gala was held in Russia for the 80th founding anniversary of Rhythmic Gymnastics. The venue was held in the historical Mariinsky Theatre in Saint Petersburg. Among those who performed at the gala were Russian former Olympic champions, Olympic medalists and World champions including: Tchachina, Evgenia Kanaeva, Yulia Barsukova, Daria Dmitrieva, and Yana Batyrshina.

== Routine music information ==
Year	Apparatus	Music title
2005	Ball	Exercises in Free Love from The Freddie Mercury Album by Freddie Mercury and Nostalgia by Yanni
2005	Rope (second)	Bora Bora, Bora Bora (Bollywood Cafe Mix) by Arash
2005	Rope (first)	Rise by Safri Duo
2005	Clubs	Chateau / Teahouse from The Matrix Reloaded by Rob D / Don Davis
2005	Ribbon (second)	Microneseren by Bobby Hughes Combination
2005	Ribbon (first)	Ulichnie strasti by Didulya
2004	Hoop	Pirates of the Caribbean by Klaus Badelt
2004	Ball	Harem by Sarah Brightman
2004	Clubs	Laissez moi me griser by Maurice El Medioni
2004	Ribbon	Malagueña Salerosa ( Remix )
2003	Hoop	Melagholia Mou by Giorgos Alkaios
2003	Ball	Mystic Moon by Bowfire
2003	Clubs	The Mall Chase / The Army Arrives from Evolution by John Powell
2003	Ribbon (second)	Dai mi go dai by Azis
2003	Ribbon (first)	Gypsy Potion by Guido Luciani
2002	Hoop	Iridian / Big Drum Small World by Dhol Foundation
2002	Rope	Heat of the Day by Pat Metheny
2002	Clubs	The Mall Chase / The Army Arrives from Evolution by John Powell
2002	Ball	Mystic Moon by Bowfire
2001	Hoop	Supersonic (Brainbug Remix) by Music Instructor
2001	Rope	Jumpin' Jack by Big Bad Voodoo Daddy
2001	Clubs	Gypsy Potion by Guido Luciani
2001	Ball	Prologue, Marco Polo by Loreena McKennitt
2000	Hoop	Walpurgis Night (Danse de Phryne) from Faust by Charles Gounod
2000	Rope	Danza de la molinera from El sombrero de tres picos by Manuel de Falla
2000	Ball	Caravan
2000	Ribbon	Bésame Mucho by Consuelo Velazques
1999	Hoop	Main Theme from The Saint by Graeme Revell
1999	Rope	?
1999	Ball	Caravan
1999	Ribbon	Andaluza by Granados
1998	Hoop	Toccata and Fugue in D Minor by Johann Sebastian Bach
1998	Clubs	Spartacus by Aram Khatchaturian
1998	Rope	?
1998	Ribbon	Espana Cani by Narro Pascual Marquina
1997	Hoop	?
1997	Clubs	Spartacus by Aram Khatchaturian
1997	Rope	Hanky Panky by Madonna
1997	Ribbon	Espana Cani by Narro Pascual Marquina

== Detailed Olympic results ==
Year	Competition Description	Location	Music	Apparatus	Score-Final	Score-Qualifying
2004	Olympics	Athens		All-around	107.325	105.675
2004	Olympics	Athens	Malagueña Salerosa ( Remix )	Ribbon	26.300	26.725
2004	Olympics	Athens	Harem by Sarah Brightman	Ball	27.100	26.700
2004	Olympics	Athens	Pirates of the Caribbean by Klaus Badelt	Hoop	27.100	26.450
2004	Olympics	Athens	Laissez moi me griser by Maurice El Medioni	Clubs	26.825	25.800
