= Gymnastics in Azerbaijan =

Gymnastics (Azerbaijani: Gimnastika) is a popular sport in Azerbaijan.

== History ==
Gymnastics was introduced to Azerbaijan in the Soviet period when Azerbaijani gymnast Lina Vinnikova participated in the 1961 world tournament in Germany.

Aside from artistic gymnastics, rhythmic gymnastics started to develop in Azerbaijan after the 1984 Summer Olympics. Rhythmic gymnastics was particularly boosted after Mehriban Aliyeva become President of the Azerbaijan Gymnastics Federation in 2002.

Azerbaijan has produced many notable and talented gymnasts including Valery Belenky, Aliya Garayeva, Anna Gurbanova, Dinara Gimatova and hosted big competitions like the 2005 World Rhythmic Gymnastics Championships, 2007 Rhythmic Gymnastics European Championships, 2009 Rhythmic Gymnastics European Championships and 2014 Rhythmic Gymnastics European Championships. As of November 2013, Yulia Inshina and Anna Pavlova will be representing Azerbaijan.

In 2015, the National Gymnastics Arena was built in Azerbaijan.

== Events ==
The first sporting championship in 5 disciplines of gymnastics (Men's and Women's Artistic Gymnastics, Trampoline Gymnastics, Acrobatic Gymnastics and Aerobic Gymnastics) – the Joint Gymnastics Championships in Azerbaijan – was organized in August 2014. In December 2014, an Inter-regional Cup was conducted in the framework of Azerbaijan and Baku Rhythmic Gymnastics Championship. In March 2015, the Open Joint Azerbaijan Championship in Gymnastics was organized as a test event before Baku 2015.

Azerbaijan hosted several international championships in gymnastics:

Competitions	Date
World Cup series in Rhythmic Gymnastics (A category)	August 2003
World Cup series in Rhythmic Gymnastics (A category)	April 2004
The World Cup A series (“AGF” Cup) in Rhythmic Gymnastics	May 2005
The 27th World Rhythmic Gymnastics Championship	October 2005
The 23rd European Rhythmic Gymnastics Championship	June–July 2007
25th European Rhythmic Gymnastics Championships	May 2009
30th European Rhythmic Gymnastics Championships	June 2014
FIG Artistic Gymnastics World Challenge Cup AGF Trophy	February 2016
FIG World Trampoline Gymnastics Cup AGF Trophy	March 2016
The FIG Rhythmic Gymnastics World Cup AGF Trophy	July 2016
FIG Trampoline Gymnastics and Tumbling World Cup AGF Trophy	February 2017
FIG Artistic Gymnastics World Cup AGF Trophy	March 2017
FIG Rhythmic Gymnastics World Cup series AGF Trophy	April 2017
FIG Artistic Gymnastics Individual Apparatus World Cup AGF Trophy	March 2018
26th European Championships in Trampoline, Tumbling and Double Mini-Trampoline	April 2018
FIG Rhythmic Gymnastics World Cup, AGF Trophy	April 2018
FIG Acrobatic Gymnastics World Cup, AGF Trophy	November 2018
FIG World Cup in Trampoline Gymnastics and Tumbling, AGF Trophy 2019	February 2019
FIG Artistic Gymnastics Individual Apparatus World Cup, AGF Trophy 2019	March 2019
FIG Rhythmic Gymnastics World Cup, AGF Trophy 2019	April 2019
35th European Rhythmic Gymnastics Championships	May 2019
The 11th European Aerobic Gymnastics Championships	May 2019
FIG Rhythmic Gymnastics World Championships	September 2019

== Medal winners ==
Championship	Individual/Team	Rank	Event	Year
23rd European Rhythmic Gymnastics Championship	Aliya Garayeva	1st place, gold medalist(s)	Rope	June–July 2007
23rd European Rhythmic Gymnastics Championship	Team of Aliya Garayeva, Dinara Gimatova, and Anna Gurbanova	3rd place, bronze medalist(s)		June–July 2007
28th World Rhythmic Gymnastics Championship	Team of Aliya Garayeva, Dinara Gimatova, Anna Gurbanova, Zeynab Javadli	3rd place, bronze medalist(s)		September 2007
"AEON Cup" Worldwide Rhythmic Gymnastics Club Championship	Team of Aliya Garayeva, Zeynab Javadli and Samira Mustafayeva	3rd place, bronze medalist(s)		October 2008
25th European Rhythmic Gymnastics Championships	Team of Aliya Garayeva and Anna Gurbanova	2nd place, silver medalist(s)		May 2009
25th European Rhythmic Gymnastics Championships	Anna Gurbanova	3rd place, bronze medalist(s)	Final of Ball	May 2009
25th European Rhythmic Gymnastics Championships	Junior Team of Sabina Abbasova, Nigar Abdusalimova, Yevgeniya Zhidkova, Ayelita Khalafova, Kamilla Mammadova, Lala Maharramova	2nd place, silver medalist(s)	Final of Ribbons	May 2009
8th World Game	Aliya Garayeva	3rd place, bronze medalist(s)	Final exercise with a Ribbon at Rhythmic Gymnastics	July 2009
8th World Game	Women's Pair - Ayla Ahmadova and Dilara Sultanova	2nd place, silver medalist(s)	Final of Combined exercises at Acrobatic Gymnastics	July 2009
29th World Rhythmic Gymnastics Championships	Aliya Garayeva	2nd place, silver medalist(s)	Final with a Ball	September 2009
29th World Rhythmic Gymnastics Championships	Team of Aliya Garayeva, Anna Gurbanova, Zeynab Javadli	3rd place, bronze medalist(s)		September 2009
24th European Acrobatic Gymnastics Championships	Women's Pair of Ayla Ahmadova and Dilara Sultanova	1st place, gold medalist(s) 2nd place, silver medalist(s) 3rd place, bronze medalist(s)	Dynamic Balance All-Around Final	October 2009
26th European Rhythmic Gymnastics Championships	Aliya Garayeva	3rd place, bronze medalist(s)	All-Around	April 2010
26th European Rhythmic Gymnastics Championships	Lala Yusifova	2nd place, silver medalist(s)	Final of Ball	April 2010
26th European Rhythmic Gymnastics Championships	Team of Irada Ahadzada, Madina Hasanova, Mansura Mehdiyeva, Aliya Pashayeva	3rd place, bronze medalist(s)	in total of two performances (4 Hoops, 4 Ribbons)	April 2010
30th World Rhythmic Gymnastics Championships	Aliya Garayeva	3	Final exercises with a Hoop, a Ball and a Ribbon	September 2010
30th World Rhythmic Gymnastics Championships	Team of Aliya Garayeva, Anna Gurbanova, Samira Mustafayeva	3rd place, bronze medalist(s)		September 2010
27th European Rhythmic Gymnastics Championships	Junior Team of Lala Yusifova, Aysha Mustafayeva, Mansura Bagiyeva, Aynur Jabbarli, Sabina Garatova, Siyana Vasileva	3rd place, bronze medalist(s)	Final with 5 Ropes	May 2011
26th World Universiade	Aliya Garayeva	2nd place, silver medalist(s)	Final with Clubs at Rhythmic Gymnastics	August 2011
31st World Rhythmic Gymnastics Championships	Aliya Garayeva	3rd place, bronze medalist(s)	All-Around Final	September 2011
28th European Rhythmic Gymnastics Championships	Aliya Garayeva	3rd place, bronze medalist(s)	All-Around Final	June 2012
28th European Rhythmic Gymnastics Championships	Nilufar Niftaliyeva (junior)	3rd place, bronze medalist(s)	Final of Hoop	June 2012
28th European Rhythmic Gymnastics Championships	Gulsum Shafizada (junior)	3rd place, bronze medalist(s)	Final of Ribbon	June 2012
"Children of Asia" 5th International Sports Games	Nilufar Niftaliyeva	2 1	All-Around, Clubs Hoop	July 2012
"Children of Asia" 5th International Sports Games	Mansura Bagiyeva	2nd place, silver medalist(s) 3rd place, bronze medalist(s)	Ribbon Ball	July 2012
London Olympic Games	Aliya Garayeva	4th	All-Around Final at Rhythmic Gymnastics	August 2012
29th European Rhythmic Gymnastics Championships	Junior Team of Gulsum Shafizada, Nilufar Niftaliyeva, Sabina Hummatova, Aleksandra Platonova, Emilya Bagiyeva, Aynur Mustafayeva	2nd place, silver medalist(s)	Final with 5 Hoops	June 2013
European Women's Artistic Gymnastics Championships	Anna Pavlova	2nd place, silver medalist(s)		May 2014
30th European Rhythmic Gymnastics Championships	Team of Siyana Vasileva, Aliya Pashayeva, Diana Doman, Aleksandra Platonova, Aynur Mustafayeva	2nd place, silver medalist(s)	Final with 3 Balls and 2 Ribbons	June 2014
30th European Rhythmic Gymnastics Championships	Zhala Piriyeva	2nd place, silver medalist(s)	Final with a Hoop	June 2014
30th European Rhythmic Gymnastics Championships	Junior team of Zhala Piriyeva and Zuleykha Ismayilova	3rd place, bronze medalist(s)		June 2014
31st Rhythmic Gymnastics European Championships	Marina Durunda	3rd place, bronze medalist(s)	Final with a Ribbon	May 2015
Baku 2015	Oleg Stepko	1st place, gold medalist(s)	Final on Parallel Bars	June 2015
Baku 2015	Oleg Stepko	2nd place, silver medalist(s)	All-Around	June 2015
Baku 2015	Oleg Stepko	2nd place, silver medalist(s)	on Pommel Horse	June 2015
Baku 2015	Oleg Stepko	3rd place, bronze medalist(s)	on Vault Artistic Gymnastics	June 2015
Baku 2015	Team of Oleg Stepko, Petro Pakhnyuk, Eldar Safarov	3rd place, bronze medalist(s)	Artistic Gymnastics	June 2015
Baku 2015	Marina Durunda	2nd place, silver medalist(s)	Final with a Ribbon at Rhythmic Gymnastics	June 2015
Baku 2015	Ilya Grishunin	3rd place, bronze medalist(s)	Final Trampoline Gymnastics	June 2015
34th World Rhythmic Gymnastics Championships	Marina Durunda	6th	All-Around Final	September 2015
8th European Age Group Competitions in Acrobatic Gymnastics	Men's Pair of Seymur Jafarov and Murad Akparov	2nd place, silver medalist(s)	Final Combined exercises	September 2015
8th European Age Group Competitions in Acrobatic Gymnastics	Mixed Pair of Aghasif Rahimov and Nurjan Jabbarli	3rd place, bronze medalist(s)		September 2015
46th World Artistic Gymnastics Championships	Oleg Stepko	3rd place, bronze medalist(s)	Final on Parallel Bars	November 2015
9th World Acrobatic Gymnastics Age Group Competitions	Men's Pair (Seymur Jafarov-Murad Akparov)	2nd place, silver medalist(s)	Final Combined exercises	March 2016
9th World Acrobatic Gymnastics Age Group Competitions	Mixed Pair (Aghasif Rahimov-Nurjan Jabbarli)	2nd place, silver medalist(s)	Final Combined exercises	March 2016
25th European Championships in Trampoline Gymnastics, Tumbling and Double-mini Trampoline	Dmitri Fedorovski	3rd place, bronze medalist(s)	Double-mini Trampoline	April 2016
2017 World Games	Synchro Pair of Veronika Zemlianaia and Sviatlana Makshtarova	2nd place, silver medalist(s)	Trampoline	July 2017
2017 Acrobatic Gymnastics European Championships	Mixed pair of Aghasif Rahimov and Nurjan Jabbarli	3rd place, bronze medalist(s)	final of All-Around and Balance exercises among juniors	October 2017
25th Trampoline Gymnastics World Age Group Competitions	Mikhail Malkin	1st place, gold medalist(s)	Tumbling	November 2017

== See also ==
Azerbaijan Gymnastics Federation
