= 2003–2004 FIG Rhythmic Gymnastics World Cup series =

International rhythm gymnastics competition

The 2003–2004 FIG Rhythmic Gymnastics World Cup series was a series of stages where events in rhythmic gymnastics were contested. The series consisted of a two-year long competition, culminating at a final event — the World Cup Final in 2004. A number of qualifier stages were held. The top 3 gymnasts and groups in each apparatus at the qualifier events would receive medals and prize money. Gymnasts and groups that finished in the top 8 also received points which were added up to a ranking that qualified for the biennial World Cup Final.

== Stages ==
Year	Event	Location	Type	Ref.
2003	World Cup qualifier	(France) Corbeil-Essonnes	Individuals (all-around and apparatus)	
2003	~~World Cup qualifier~~	(Russia) Nizhny Novgorod	Canceled (Groups)	
2003	World Cup qualifier	(Azerbaijan) Baku	Individuals (all-around and apparatus)	
2003	World Cup qualifier	(Spain) Zaragoza	Individuals (all-around and apparatus)	
2004	World Cup qualifier	(Azerbaijan) Baku	Individuals (all-around and apparatus)	
2004	World Cup qualifier	(Russia) Nizhny Novgorod	Groups (all-around)	
2004	World Cup qualifier	(Germany) Duisburg	Groups (all-around and apparatus)	
2004	World Cup qualifier	(Bulgaria) Varna	Individuals and groups (all-around)	
2004	World Cup qualifier	(Uzbekistan) Tashkent	Individuals (all-around and apparatus)	
2004	World Cup Final	(Russia) Moscow	Individuals and groups (apparatus)	

== Medalists ==
=== Individual ===
==== All-around ====
Competitions	Gold	Silver	Bronze
Corbeil 2003	(Russia) Irina Tchachina	(Ukraine) Anna Bessonova	(Russia) Alina Kabaeva
Baku 2003	(Russia) Alina Kabaeva	(Russia) Irina Tchachina	(Azerbaijan) Dinara Gimatova
Zaragoza 2003	(Russia) Irina Tchachina	(Russia) Alina Kabaeva	(Belarus) Inna Zhukova
Baku 2004	(Russia) Alina Kabaeva	(Kazakhstan) Aliya Yusupova	(Russia) Olga Kapranova
Varna 2004	(Russia) Irina Tchachina	(Russia) Alina Kabaeva	(Kazakhstan) Aliya Yusupova
Tashkent 2004	(Russia) Alina Kabaeva	(Kazakhstan) Aliya Yusupova	(Russia) Olga Kapranova
Moscow 2004	No all-around competition		

==== Hoop ====
Competitions	Gold	Silver	Bronze
Corbeil 2003	(Russia) Irina Tchachina	(Russia) Alina Kabaeva	(Ukraine) Anna Bessonova
Baku 2003	(Russia) Irina Tchachina	(Russia) Alina Kabaeva	(Bulgaria) Simona Peycheva
Zaragoza 2003	(Russia) Irina Tchachina	(Russia) Alina Kabaeva	(Belarus) Inna Zhukova
Baku 2004	(Russia) Alina Kabaeva	(Russia) Irina Tchachina	(Kazakhstan) Aliya Yusupova
Varna 2004	All-around only		
Tashkent 2004	(Kazakhstan) Aliya Yussupova	(Russia) Olga Kapranova	(Azerbaijan) Anna Gurbanova
Moscow 2004	(Russia) Alina Kabaeva	(Bulgaria) Simona Peycheva	(Russia) Olga Kapranova

==== Ball ====
Competitions	Gold	Silver	Bronze
Corbeil 2003	(Russia) Irina Tchachina	(Ukraine) Anna Bessonova	(Belarus) Inna Zhukova
Baku 2003	(Russia) Alina Kabaeva	(Russia) Irina Tchachina	(Azerbaijan) Dinara Gimatova
Zaragoza 2003	(Russia) Irina Tchachina	(Russia) Alina Kabaeva	(Spain) Almudena Cid
Baku 2004	(Russia) Alina Kabaeva	(Kazakhstan) Aliya Yusupova	(Russia) Irina Tchachina
Varna 2004	All-around only		
Tashkent 2004	(Russia) Olga Kapranova	(Uzbekistan) Olesya Ashaeva	(Kazakhstan) Aliya Yussupova
Moscow 2004	(Russia) Irina Tchachina	(Kazakhstan) Aliya Yusupova	(Belarus) Inna Zhukova

==== Clubs ====
Competitions	Gold	Silver	Bronze
Corbeil 2003	(Russia) Irina Tchachina	(Russia) Alina Kabaeva	(Ukraine) Anna Bessonova
Baku 2003	(Russia) Alina Kabaeva	(Azerbaijan) Dinara Gimatova	(Russia) Irina Tchachina
Zaragoza 2003	(Russia) Alina Kabaeva	(Russia) Irina Tchachina	(Kazakhstan) Aliya Yusupova
Baku 2004	(Russia) Alina Kabaeva	(Kazakhstan) Aliya Yusupova	(Azerbaijan) Dinara Gimatova
Varna 2004	All-around only		
Tashkent 2004	(Russia) Olga Kapranova	(Azerbaijan) Anna Gurbanova	(Uzbekistan) Olesya Ashaeva
Moscow 2004	(Russia) Irina Tchachina	(Kazakhstan) Aliya Yusupova	(Russia) Olga Kapranova

==== Ribbon ====
Competitions	Gold	Silver	Bronze
Corbeil 2003	(Ukraine) Anna Bessonova	(Russia) Irina Tchachina	(Ukraine) Tamara Yerofeeva
Baku 2003	(Russia) Alina Kabaeva	(Russia) Irina Tchachina	(Belarus) Inna Zhukova
Zaragoza 2003	(Russia) Irina Tchachina	(Belarus) Svetlana Rudalova	(Russia) Alina Kabaeva
Baku 2004	(Russia) Alina Kabaeva	(Kazakhstan) Aliya Yusupova	(Russia) Olga Kapranova
Varna 2004	All-around only		
Tashkent 2004	(Russia) Olga Kapranova	(Kazakhstan) Aliya Yussupova	(Azerbaijan) Anna Gurbanova
Moscow 2004	(Russia) Alina Kabaeva	(Bulgaria) Simona Peycheva	(Russia) Olga Kapranova

=== Group ===
==== All-around ====
Competitions	Gold	Silver	Bronze
Nizhny 2004	Russia	Belarus	Italy
Duisburg 2004	Russia	Italy	Belarus
Varna 2004	Russia	Belarus	Bulgaria
Moscow 2004	No all-around competition		

==== 5 ribbons ====
Competitions	Gold	Silver	Bronze
Nizhny 2004	All-around only		
Duisburg 2004	Russia	Italy	Belarus
Varna 2004	All-around only		
Moscow 2004	Russia	Poland	Finland

==== 3 hoops and 2 balls ====
Competitions	Gold	Silver	Bronze
Nizhny 2004	All-around only		
Duisburg 2004	Russia	Belarus	Italy
Varna 2004	All-around only		
Moscow 2004	Russia	Poland	Finland

== See also ==
- 2003–2004 FIG Artistic Gymnastics World Cup series
- 2003 Rhythmic Gymnastics Grand Prix circuit
- 2004 Rhythmic Gymnastics Grand Prix circuit
