= 2005 European Rhythmic Gymnastics Championships =

2005 Rhythmic Gymnastics European Championships
- Location: Moscow, Russia
- Start date: 10 June 2005
- End date: 12 June 2005

The 21st Rhythmic Gymnastics European Championships were held in Moscow, Russia, from 10 to 12 April 2005. Medals were contested in three disciplines : team competition, junior groups and senior individual with four apparatus.

== Medal winners ==
Event	Gold	Silver	Bronze
Senior Individual
Rope	Irina Tchachina; Russia	Olga Kapranova; Russia	Anna Bessonova; Ukraine
Ball	Olga Kapranova; Russia	Anna Bessonova; Ukraine	Inna Zhukova; Belarus
Clubs	Irina Tchachina; Russia	Olga Kapranova; Russia	Anna Bessonova; Ukraine
Ribbon	Natalia Godunko; Ukraine	Anna Bessonova; Ukraine	Inna Zhukova; Belarus
Team Competition
Team	Russia; Irina Tchachina; Olga Kapranova; Vera Sessina	Ukraine; Anna Bessonova; Natalia Godunko	Belarus; Inna Zhukova; Valeria Kurylskaya; Liubov Charkashyna
Junior Groups
5 balls	Belarus	Russia	Greece

== Results ==
=== Seniors ===
==== Team ====
Rank	Nation	Hoop (rhythmic gymnastics)	Ball (rhythmic gymnastics)	Clubs (rhythmic gymnastics)	Ribbon (rhythmic gymnastics)	Total
1st place, gold medalist(s)	Russia	33.425	33.725	33.100	33.375	133.625
2nd place, silver medalist(s)	Ukraine	32.100	31.500	31.500	31.400	126.500
3rd place, bronze medalist(s)	Belarus	30.850	30.700	31.125	29.925	122.600
4	Bulgaria	30.525	30.575	30.600	29.175	120.875
5	Azerbaijan	29.775	29.850	30.000	28.850	118.475
6	Spain	28.125	28.500	28.500	27.000	112.125
7	Greece	27.500	28.350	28.250	27.950	112.050
8	Israel	26.750	28.550	27.775	28.000	111.075
9	Italy	26.500	27.850	26.475	27.225	108.050
10	Poland	26.425	27.100	25.825	26.325	105.675
11	Czech Republic	25.550	25.675	25.750	25.050	102.025
12	Slovenia	25.300	25.200	25.375	24.025	99.900
13	Turkey					98.275
14	France					98.050
15	Finland					98.025
16	Austria					97.650
17	Latvia					97.475
18	Estonia					96.775
19	Slovakia					92.075
20	Hungary					91.600
21	Portugal					89.525
22	Moldova					89.000
23	Great Britain					88.975
24	Lithuania					81.425
25	Armenia					57.900

==== Ball ====
Rank	Gymnast	Nation	D Score	E Score	A Score	Pen.	Total
1st place, gold medalist(s)	Olga Kapranova	Russia	7.900	8.850	8.550	0.05	17.025
2nd place, silver medalist(s)	Anna Bessonova	Ukraine	7.000	8.700	8.300	-	16.350
3rd place, bronze medalist(s)	Inna Zhukova	Belarus	7.150	8.650	8.250	0.05	16.300
4	Simona Peycheva	Bulgaria	6.800	8.550	8.150	-	16.025
5	Natalia Godunko	Ukraine	6.950	8.500	8.050	-	16.000
6	Irina Tchachina	Russia	7.400	8.300	8.150	0.20	15.875
7	Anna Gurbanova	Azerbaijan	6.250	8.300	7.600	-	15.225
8	Valeria Kurylskaya	Belarus	5.900	7.900	7.00	0.40	13.950

==== Rope ====
Rank	Gymnast	Nation	D Score	E Score	A Score	Pen.	Total
1st place, gold medalist(s)	Irina Tchachina	Russia	7.900	8.800	8.600	-	17.050
2nd place, silver medalist(s)	Olga Kapranova	Russia	7.900	8.700	8.500	0.05	16.850
3rd place, bronze medalist(s)	Anna Bessonova	Ukraine	6.900	8.600	8.250	-	16.175
4	Inna Zhukova	Belarus	6.950	8.500	8.100	-	16.025
5	Natalia Godunko	Ukraine	6.700	8.500	8.200	0.05	15.900
6	Simona Peycheva	Bulgaria	6.750	8.450	8.000	-	15.825
7	Dinara Gimatova	Azerbaijan	6.150	8.250	7.700	-	15.175
8	Anna Gurbanova	Azerbaijan	6.000	8.250	7.650	-	15.075

==== Clubs ====
Rank	Gymnast	Nation	D Score	E Score	A Score	Pen.	Total
1st place, gold medalist(s)	Irina Tchachina	Russia	8.000	8.850	8.600	-	17.150'
2nd place, silver medalist(s)	Olga Kapranova	Russia	7.850	8.550	8.250	-	16.600
3rd place, bronze medalist(s)	Anna Bessonova	Ukraine	7.000	8.600	8.350	-	16.275
4	SImona Peycheva	Bulgaria	6.650	8.300	7.950	-	15.600
5	Inna Zhukova	Belarus	6.950	8.300	8.000	0.20	15.575
6	Liubov Charkashyna	Belarus	6.250	8.400	7.700	-	15.375
7	Natalia Godunko	Ukraine	6.550	8.100	7.900	-	15.325
8	Anna Gurbanova	Azerbaijan	6.000	8.350	7.650	-	15.175

==== Ribbon ====
Rank	Gymnast	Nation	D Score	E Score	A Score	Pen.	Total
1st place, gold medalist(s)	Natalia Godunko	Ukraine	7.050	8.550	8.300	-	16.225
2nd place, silver medalist(s)	Anna Bessonova	Ukraine	6.700	8.650	8.300	-	16.150
3rd place, bronze medalist(s)	Inna Zhukova	Belarus	6.900	8.400	8.050	-	15.875
4	Vera Sessina	Russia	7.400	8.350	7.750	0.40	15.525
5	Simona Peycheva	Bulgaria	6.450	8.250	7.850	-	15.400
6	Irina Tchachina	Russia	7.200	8.100	7.350	-	15.375
7	Valeria Kurylskaya	Belarus	5.850	8.000	7.350	-	14.600
8	Irina Risenson	Israel	5.800	8.150	7.200	0.25	14.400

=== Groups ===
Rank	Nation	D Score	A Score	E Score	Pen.	Total
1st place, gold medalist(s)	Belarus	6.050	8.350	16.400		26.500
2nd place, silver medalist(s)	Russia	6.700	8.300	16.000	0.40	25.650
3rd place, bronze medalist(s)	Greece	5.050	7.400	15.000		24.300
4	Spain	4.950	7.400	14.300		23.875
5	Bulgaria	5.000	7.200	14.400	0.40	23.850
6	Ukraine	4.500	6.650	14.500		23.500
7	Israel	4.250	6.400	14.600		22.550
8	Hungary	4.450	6.400	14.400		21.925

== Medal table ==
Rank	Nation	Gold	Silver	Bronze	Total
1	Russia (RUS)	4	3	0	7
2	Ukraine (UKR)	1	3	2	6
3	Belarus (BLR)	1	0	3	4
4	Greece (GRE)	0	0	1	1
Totals (4 entries)		6	6	6	18
