= Gymnastics at the 2004 Summer Olympics – Women's rhythmic individual all-around =

Women's rhythmic individual all-around at the Games of the XXVII Olympiad
- Venue: Galatsi Olympic Hall

Medalists
1st place, gold medalist(s)		Alina Kabaeva	Russia
2nd place, silver medalist(s)		Irina Tchachina	Russia
3rd place, bronze medalist(s)		Anna Bessonova	Ukraine

These are the results of the rhythmic individual all-around competition, one of the two events of the rhythmic gymnastics discipline contested at the 2004 Summer Olympics. The qualification and final rounds took place on August 27 and August 29 at the Galatsi Olympic Hall.

== Qualification ==
Twenty-four gymnasts competed in the individual all-around event in the rhythmic gymnastics qualification round on August 27. The ten highest scoring gymnasts advanced to the final on August 29.

Almudena Cid of Spain competed for a place on the final, at the time it was a then record breaking appearance for a rhythmic gymnast, a feat she would break four years later at the 2008 Summer Olympics.

Rank	Gymnast	Nation	Hoop (rhythmic gymnastics)	Ball (rhythmic gymnastics)	Clubs (rhythmic gymnastics)	Ribbon (rhythmic gymnastics)	Total	Qual.
1	Alina Kabaeva	Russia	26.050 (2)	27.250 (1)	26.475 (2)	26.100 (2)	105.875	Q
2	Irina Tchachina	Russia	26.450 (1)	26.700 (3)	25.800 (4)	26.725 (1)	105.675	Q
3	Anna Bessonova	Ukraine	25.900 (4)	26.750 (2)	26.750 (1)	25.325 (3)	104.725	Q
4	Natalia Godunko	Ukraine	25.975 (3)	25.900 (5)	26.075 (3)	24.800 (5)	102.750	Q
5	Aliya Yussupova	Kazakhstan	25.800 (5)	26.150 (4)	25.725 (5)	23.825 (8)	101.500	Q
6	Eleni Andriola	Greece	24.850 (9)	25.350 (6)	24.500 (9)	24.900 (4)	99.600	Q
7	Simona Peycheva	Bulgaria	25.475 (6)	24.800 (8)	24.700 (=7)	23.725 (9)	98.700	Q
8	Inna Zhukova	Belarus	24.575 (10)	24.200 (12)	25.100 (6)	24.700 (6)	98.575	Q
9	Almudena Cid	Spain	24.975 (=7)	24.900 (7)	24.700 (=7)	23.150 (12)	97.725	Q
10	Svetlana Rudalova	Belarus	23.925 (=12)	24.600 (9)	24.350 (10)	23.050 (13)	95.925	Q
11	Theodora Pallidou	Greece	24.150 (11)	24.475 (10)	23.200 (14)	23.400 (10)	95.225	R
12	Elizabeth Paisieva	Bulgaria	24.975 (=7)	21.975 (20)	23.850 (11)	23.975 (7)	94.775	R
13	Laura Zacchilli	Italy	23.925 (=12)	24.225 (11)	23.250 (13)	22.700 (14)	94.100	-
14	Anna Gurbanova	Azerbaijan	22.775 (15)	23.525 (13)	22.800 (17)	23.200 (11)	92.300	-
15	Mary Sanders	United States	21.250 (19)	23.250 (14)	23.400 (12)	22.100 (16)	90.000	-
16	Katerina Pisetsky	Israel	22.675 (16)	22.750 (17)	23.100 (15)	21.425 (18)	89.950	-
17	Zhong Ling	China	20.875 (20)	22.400 (19)	22.950 (16)	22.400 (15)	88.625	-
18	Yukari Murata	Japan	21.775 (18)	22.425 (18)	22.400 (18)	21.550 (17)	88.150	-
19	Lisa Ingildeeva	Germany	22.825 (14)	22.900 (=15)	22.150 (19)	19.650 (21)	87.525	-
20	Dominika Červenková	Czech Republic	22.350 (17)	22.900 (=15)	18.300 (24)	21.200 (20)	84.750	-
21	Hannah McKibbin	Great Britain	20.675 (21)	20.800 (21)	19.600 (20)	21.225 (19)	82.300	-
22	Stephanie Sandler	South Africa	18.550 (23)	18.525 (24)	19.100 (22)	17.100 (22)	73.275	-
23	Penelope Blackmore	Australia	19.575 (22)	19.325 (22)	19.600 (20)	14.550 (24)	73.050	-
24	Wania Monteiro	Cape Verde	18.050 (24)	18.550 (23)	18.400 (23)	16.900 (23)	71.900	-

== Final ==
Rank	Name		Hoop		Ball		Clubs		Ribbon		Total
Gold medal	Alina Kabaeva (RUS)	TV	8.700	26.800	8.600	27.350	8.700	27.150	8.700	27.100	108.400
Gold medal	Alina Kabaeva (RUS)	AV	9.000	26.800	9.500	27.350	9.200	27.150	9.300	27.100	108.400
Gold medal	Alina Kabaeva (RUS)	EX	9.100	26.800	9.250	27.350	9.300	27.150	9.100	27.100	108.400
Silver medal	Irina Tchachina (RUS)	TV	8.600	27.100	8.500	27.100	8.500	26.825	8.500	26.300	107.325
Silver medal	Irina Tchachina (RUS)	AV	9.300	27.100	9.400	27.100	9.100	26.825	9.100	26.300	107.325
Silver medal	Irina Tchachina (RUS)	EX	9.200	27.100	9.200	27.100	9.275	26.825	8.800	26.300	107.325
Bronze medal	Anna Bessonova (UKR)	TV	8.500	26.500	8.400	26.525	8.700	26.950	8.500	26.725	106.700
Bronze medal	Anna Bessonova (UKR)	AV	8.900	26.500	9.000	26.525	9.100	26.950	9.100	26.725	106.700
Bronze medal	Anna Bessonova (UKR)	EX	9.100	26.500	9.125	26.525	9.150	26.950	9.125	26.725	106.700
4	Aliya Yussupova (KAZ)	TV	8.100	25.500	8.300	26.600	8.200	26.325	8.000	25.550	103.975
4	Aliya Yussupova (KAZ)	AV	8.900	25.500	9.200	26.600	9.200	26.325	8.800	25.550	103.975
4	Aliya Yussupova (KAZ)	EX	8.500	25.500	9.100	26.600	8.925	26.325	8.900	25.550	103.975
5	Natalia Godunko (UKR)	TV	8.200	25.500	8.100	25.800	8.300	26.375	8.200	26.125	103.800
5	Natalia Godunko (UKR)	AV	8.800	25.500	8.800	25.800	9.200	26.375	9.000	26.125	103.800
5	Natalia Godunko (UKR)	EX	8.500	25.500	8.900	25.800	8.875	26.375	8.925	26.125	103.800
6	Simona Peycheva (BUL)	TV	7.800	25.375	8.100	25.675	7.800	25.600	7.700	24.400	101.050
6	Simona Peycheva (BUL)	AV	8.900	25.375	8.800	25.675	9.000	25.600	8.400	24.400	101.050
6	Simona Peycheva (BUL)	EX	8.725	25.375	8.775	25.675	8.800	25.600	8.400	24.400	101.050
7	Inna Zhukova (BLR)	TV	7.600	25.000	7.600	25.300	7.700	25.200	7.900	25.075	100.575
7	Inna Zhukova (BLR)	AV	8.600	25.000	9.000	25.300	8.650	25.200	8.500	25.075	100.575
7	Inna Zhukova (BLR)	EX	8.800	25.000	8.700	25.300	8.850	25.200	8.675	25.075	100.575
8	Almudena Cid (ESP)	TV	7.300	25.125	7.100	25.000	7.000	24.900	6.800	23.425	98.450
8	Almudena Cid (ESP)	AV	9.100	25.125	9.000	25.000	9.100	24.900	8.100	23.425	98.450
8	Almudena Cid (ESP)	EX	8.725	25.125	8.900	25.000	8.800	24.900	8.525	23.425	98.450
9	Eleni Andriola (GRE)	TV	7.400	24.475	7.600	24.800	7.000	23.500	7.400	24.825	97.600
9	Eleni Andriola (GRE)	AV	8.800	24.475	8.600	24.800	8.500	23.500	8.800	24.825	97.600
9	Eleni Andriola (GRE)	EX	8.325	24.475	8.600	24.800	8.200	23.500	8.625	24.825	97.600
10	Svetlana Rudalova (BLR)	TV	7.400	24.700	7.600	25.000	7.200	24.125	7.400	23.450	97.275
10	Svetlana Rudalova (BLR)	AV	8.600	24.700	8.600	25.000	8.600	24.125	7.500	23.450	97.275
10	Svetlana Rudalova (BLR)	EX	8.700	24.700	8.800	25.000	8.325	24.125	8.550	23.450	97.275

- TV — technical value; AV — artistical value; EX — execution.
