= 2005 World Rhythmic Gymnastics Championships =

- Venue: Heydar Aliyev Sports and Exhibition Complex
- Location: Baku, Azerbaijan
- Start date: 3 October 2005
- End date: 10 October 2005

The XXVII World Rhythmic Gymnastics Championships were held in Baku, the capital of Azerbaijan, 3–10 October 2005 at the Heydar Aliyev Sports and Exhibition Complex.

This was the first World Championships under the new Code of Points that had come into effect in 2005. Execution had raised from accounting for a third of the score to half, and the penalty for dropping the apparatus had increased as well; however, the difficulty score was still the most important factor on determining the event winners, as the top gymnasts were given similar execution and artistry scores. A number of gymnasts had also competed at the 2004 Summer Olympics, showing a trend toward rhythmic gymnasts both competing and peaking in their late teens and early 20s.

Although 2004 Olympic champion Alina Kabaeva was not named to the Russian team (though she attended the event as a representative for Longines), Russian gymnasts dominated the competition, winning every gold medal in the individual events. Olga Kapranova won the all-around title and every apparatus title except ribbon, which Vera Sessina won instead. Ukrainian Anna Bessonova won silver in every individual event.

The Russian group won their fourth consecutive World all-around title. The two apparatus finals were more hotly contested; the Italian group won gold in the mixed apparatus final with a routine that demonstrated excellent synchronization and kept the apparatuses in constant motion. The Bulgarian group won the five ribbons final, their first gold at the World Championships since the 1996 World Championships.

The Longines Prize for Elegance was awarded to Irina Tchachina.

== Medal winners ==
Event	Gold	Silver	Bronze
Team Competition
All-Around	Russia Irina Tchachina; Olga Kapranova; Vera Sessina; Svetlana Putintseva	Ukraine Anna Bessonova; Natalia Godunko; Irina Kovalchuk	Belarus Inna Zhukova; Liubov Charkashyna; Valeria Kurylskaya; Svetlana Rudalova
Individual Finals
Rope	Olga Kapranova (RUS)	Anna Bessonova (UKR)	Irina Tchachina (RUS)
Ball	Olga Kapranova (RUS)	Anna Bessonova (UKR)	Inna Zhukova (BLR)
Clubs	Olga Kapranova (RUS)	Anna Bessonova (UKR)	Irina Tchachina (RUS)
Ribbon	Vera Sessina (RUS)	Anna Bessonova (UKR)	Natalia Godunko (UKR)
All-Around	Olga Kapranova (RUS)	Anna Bessonova (UKR)	Irina Tchachina (RUS)
Groups Finals
All-Around	Russia; Olesia Beluguina; Olesia Byk; Olga Glatskikh; Tatiana Kurbakova; Liubov Popova	Italy; Elisa Blanchi; Fabrizia D’Ottavio; Marinella Falca; Daniela Masseroni; Elisa Santoni; Laura Vernizzi	Belarus; Alexandri Barysevich; Yavhenia Burlo; Vera Davidovich; Dzina Haitsiukevich; Zinaida Lunina; Hlafira Martsinovich
5 Ribbons	Bulgaria; Iordanka Andonova; Eleonora Kezhova; Zornitsa Marinova; Kristina Ranguelova; Joanna Tancheva*; Tatiana Tongova	Italy; Elisa Blanchi; Fabrizia D’Ottavio; Marinella Falca; Daniela Masseroni*; Elisa Santoni; Laura Vernizzi	Russia; Olesia Beluguina; Olesia Byk; Olga Glatskikh; Tatiana Kurbakova; Liubov Popova
3 Hoops + 2 Clubs	Italy; Elisa Blanchi; Fabrizia D’Ottavio; Marinella Falca*; Daniela Masseroni; Elisa Santoni; Laura Vernizzi	Russia; Olesia Beluguina; Olesia Byk; Olga Glatskikh; Tatiana Kurbakova; Liubov Popova	Belarus; Alexandri Barysevich; Yavhenia Burlo; Vera Davidovich; Dzina Haitsiukevich; Zinaida Lunina*; Hlafira Martsinovich

* reserve gymnast

== Individual ==
=== Qualifications ===
Place	Nation	Name	Rope	Ball	Clubs	Ribbon	Total
1	(Russia)	Olga Kapranova	16.250 (3)	17.275 (1)	16.900 (1)	16.575 (3)	50.750
2	(Russia)	Irina Tchachina	16.525 (1)	16.500 (2)	16.475 (3)	16.275 (4)	49.500
3	(Ukraine)	Anna Bessonova	16.450 (2)	15.600 (6)	16.525 (2)	15.950 (5)	48.925
4	(Ukraine)	Natalia Godunko	15.800 (5)	15.975 (4)	15.975 (4)	16.625 (2)	48.575
5	(Russia)	Vera Sessina	16.100 (4)		14.775 (7)	17.150 (1)	48.025
6	(Belarus)	Inna Zhukova	15.450 (6)	16.025 (3)	15.025 (6)	15.450 (6)	46.925
7	(Bulgaria)	Simona Peycheva	15.175 (7)	15.125 (8)	15.200 (5)	15.125 (9)	45.500
8	(Azerbaijan)	Anna Gurbanova	14.450 (8)	15.075 (9)	14.450 (12)	15.025 (10)	44.550
9	(Kazakhstan)	Aliya Yusupova	13.925 (11)	14.425 (13)	14.625 (8)	15.450 (7)	44.500
10	(Azerbaijan)	Dinara Gimatova	13.575 (17)	14.650 (11)	14.450 (11)	15.250 (8)	44.350
11	(Belarus)	Liubov Charkashyna	14.075 (10)	15.150 (7)	14.150 (15)		43.375
12	(Belarus)	Valeria Kurylskaya	13.850 (13)	15.025 (10)		14.425 (12)	43.300
13	(Spain)	Almudena Cid	13.225 (20)	14.175 (14)	14.625 (9)	14.425 (11)	43.225
14	(Bulgaria)	Elizabeth Paisieva	14.175 (9)	14.050 (15)	14.325 (13)	14.350 (13)	42.850
15	(Israel)	Irina Risenson	12.975 (23)	14.450 (12)	13.625 (20)	14.325 (14)	42.400
16	(Ukraine)	Irina Kovalchuk	13.575 (18)	13.325 (16)	14.525 (10)	13.750 (16)	41.850
17	(Bulgaria)	Stela Sultanova	13.700 (15)	13.150 (20)	13.950 (17)	13.175 (21)	40.825
18	(Czech Republic)	Dominika Červenková	13.800 (14)	13.225 (19)	13.425 (21)	13.575 (17)	40.800
19	(Italy)	Julieta Cantaluppi	13.900 (12)	13.300 (17)	13.150 (23)	13.500 (18)	40.700
20	(Japan)	Yukari Murata	13.625 (16)	12.650 (28)	13.650 (19)	13.400 (19)	40.675
21	(Spain)	Jennifer Colino	13.500 (19)	13.050 (22)	14.000 (16)	12.775 (25)	40.550
22	(Slovenia)	Moja Rode	13.075 (22)	12.625 (29)	13.775 (28)	11.875 (41)	39.475
23	(Poland)	Magdalena Markowska	12.500 (29)	13.250 (18)	12.850 (28)	12.425 (28)	38.600
24	(Finland)	Maria Ringinen	13.075 (21)	11.875 (41)	13.275 (22)	12.050 (36)	38.400
25	(Canada)	Alexandra Orlando	12.400 (32)	12.525 (32)	12.975 (26)	12.850 (22)	38.350
26	(China)	Yiming Xiao	12.600 (28)	12.775 (25)	12.950 (27)	11.600 (46)	38.325
27	(France)	Delphine Ledoux	12.825 (24)	12.675 (27)	12.150 (46)	12.800 (24)	38.300
28	(Poland)	Joanna Mitrosz	12.175 (36)	12.125 (35)	13.125 (24)	12.850 (23)	38.150
29	(Chile)	Andrea Abarca	12.750 (25)	12.600 (30)	12.350 (40)	12.525 (26)	37.875
30	(Uzbekistan)	Olesya Ashaeva	12.450 (30)	12.475 (33)	12.825 (30)	12.075 (35)	37.750
31	(Mexico)	Cynthia Valdez	12.100 (37)	12.950 (23)	12.100 (49)	12.500 (27)	37.550
32	(Kazakhstan)	Maiya Zainullina	12.425 (31)	12.775 (24)	12.275 (44)	12.125 (32)	37.475
33	(Estonia)	Irina Kikkas	12.675 (26)	10.975 (63)	12.400 (39)	12.300 (29)	37.375
34	(Italy)	Romina Laurito	12.650 (27)	11.875 (42)	12.850 (29)	11.350 (51)	37.375
35	(Kazakhstan)	Aidana Kauldasheva	9.975 (92)	12.750 (26)	12.100 (48)	12.025 (38)	36.875
36	(Austria)	Caroline Weber	11.200 (52)	12.200 (34)	12.525 (33)	12.125 (33)	36.850
37	(France)	Aurélie Lacour	11.825 (40)	11.400 (51)	12.675 (32)	12.175 (31)	36.675
38	(Turkey)	Berfin Surdil Sutcu	10.100 (87)	12.550 (31)	11.700 (59)	12.250 (30)	36.500
39	(Azerbaijan)	Vafa Huseynova	12.000 (38)	11.825 (45)	12.325 (42)	12.100 (34)	36.425
40	(Japan)	Yachiyo Nakamura		11.950 (39)	12.800 (31)	11.675 (44)	36.425
41	(Latvia)	Marina Kisluhina	12.000 (39)	11.750 (47)	12.400 (38)	11.725 (43)	36.150
42	(Spain)	Esther Escolar	11.625 (41)	13.075 (21)	11.450 (68)		36.150
43	(Germany)	Lisa Ingildeeva	12.325 (34)	11.000 (62)	11.675 (60)	11.875 (40)	35,875
44	(France)	Nathalie Fauquette	11.550 (44)	11.875 (44)	11.950 (54)	12.025 (37)	35.850
45	(Hungary)	Fruzsina Benyo	12.300 (35)	11.175 (58)	12.350 (41)	11.125 (54)	35.825
46	(China)	Dan Sun	11.550 (43)	11.875 (43)	12.325 (43)	11.125 (54)	35.750
47	(Italy)	Beatrice Zancanaro		11.925 (40)	11.700 (58)	11.750 (42)	35.375
48	(United States)	Olga Karmansky	11.050 (58)	12.050 (37)	11.725 (57)	11.550 (49)	35.325
49	(Israel)	Rahel Vigdorchick	11.175 (53)	12.100 (36)	12.025 (52)		35.300
50	(Georgia (country))	Ketevan Khatiashvili	11.025 (59)	11.225 (56)	12.500 (34)	11.575 (48)	35.300
51	(Turkey)	Gizem Oylumlu	10.650 (69)	11.100 (60)	12.425 (36)	11.675 (45)	35.200
52	(South Korea)	Sin Un-Jin	11.125 (56)	12.000 (38)	12.075 (51)	10.250 (79)	35.200
53	(Georgia (country))	Lia Yorbenadze	10.725 (68)	11.775 (46)	12.425 (37)	10.850 (59)	35.050
54	(South Korea)	Lee Kyung-hwa	11.400 (48)	11.625 (48)	12.000 (53)	10.825 (62)	35.025
55	(Canada)	Yana Tzikaridze	11.000 (61)	11.375 (53)	11.100 (81)	11.975 (39)	34.450
56	(Canada)	Carly Orava	11.5550 (45)	11.175 (57)	11.650 (61)	11.125 (53)	34.275
57	(Portugal)	Ines Gomes	10.900 (64)	10.900 (65)	12.475 (35)		34.275
58	(United States)	Lisa Wang	11.500 (46)	10.350 (79)	12.125 (47)	10.575 (67)	34.200
59	(Malaysia)	Durratun Nashihin Rosli	11.475 (47)	10.425 (77)	12.225 (45)		34.125
60	(Georgia (country))	Tatia Donadze	9.650 (96)	11.250 (55)	11.875 (55)	10.875 (57)	34.000
61	(Cyprus)	Chrysovalanti Dimitriou	9.650 (97)	11.575 (49)	11.175 (76)	11.100 (55)	33.850
62	(Slovenia)	Tjasa Seme	11.550 (42)	10.650 (71)	11.575 (63)	10.100 (80)	33,775
63	(Hungary)	Katalin Kiss	11.375 (49)	9.525 (97)	11.550 (64)	10.750 (65)	33,675
64	(Australia)	Kimberly Mason	11.050 (57)	11.400 (52)	11.175 (79)		33.625
65	(Malaysia)	Seow Ting Foong	11.150 (55)		12.100 (50)	10.375 (72)	33.625
66	(China)	Shuo Zhang	10.600 (73)	11.525 (50)	11.425 (70)	10.475 (69)	33,550
67	(Sweden)	Therese Larsson	10.825 (66)	10.400 (78)	11.500 (67)	11.075 (56)	33.400
68	(Portugal)	Raquel Muro E Silva	11.225 (50)	10.725 (69)		11.400 (50)	33.350
69	(South Africa)	Odette Richard	10.975 (62)	10.025 (87)	11.375 (71)	10.800 (64)	33.150
70	(Brazil)	Ana Paula Ribeiro	10.925 (63)	10.950 (64)	11.175 (77)	9.825 (89)	33.050
71	(United Kingdom)	Heather Mann	10.525 (75)	10.700 (70)	11.450 (69)	10.875 (58)	33.025
72	(Moldova)	Anastasia Tanurcova	11.025 (60)	9.400 (100)	11.550 (66)	10.450 (70)	33.025
73	(Malaysia)	Wen Cheng Lim		10.800 (66)	11.550 (65)	10.650 (66)	33.000
74	(Malaysia)	Hui Yee See	10.650 (70)	11.325 (54)		10.850 (60)	32.825
75	(Latvia)	Olga Alekseeva	10.275 (80)	10.625 (72)	11.575 (62)	10.575 (68)	32.775
76	(Portugal)	Mariana Romao		11.100 (59)	11.250 (74)	10.350 (74)	32.700
77	(South Africa)	Stephanie Sandler	11.225 (51)	9.900 (90)	11.000 (85)	10.250 (78)	32.475
78	(Latvia)	Alina Suloyeva	10.500 (76)	10.750 (68)	10.900 (87)	10.425 (71)	32.150
79	(Uzbekistan)	Rita Alimova	10.275 (79)	10.500 (76)	11.200 (75)	10.375 (73)	32.075
80	(Israel)	Alexandra Kalichman	10.600 (72)	10.625 (74)		10.800 (63)	32.025
81	(United Kingdom)	Rachel Ennis	10.900 (65)	10.200 (81)	10.850 (89)	10.075 (81)	31.950
82	(Brazil)	Ana Paula Scheffer	10.000 (90)	10.775 (67)	11.025 (83)	10.050 (82)	31.850
83	(Estonia)	Maria Filipova	10.225 (83)	10.100 (83)	11.250 (73)	10.275 (77)	31.750
84	(Thailand)	Sridee Tharatip	10.175 (84)	11.075 (61)	10.400 (93)	10.050 (83)	31.650
85	(Finland)	Marleena Saresvirta	10.400 (77)	10.075 (86)	11.125 (80)	10.025 (84)	31.600
86	(Portugal)	Laura Lima	10.600 (71)		11.100 (82)	9.725 (91)	31.425
87	(Czech Republic)	Iva Mendlíková	10.000 (89)	10.075 (85)	10.875 (88)	9.950 (87)	30.950
88	(Hungary)	Orsolya Zsidi	10.325 (78)	9.475 (99)	10.550 (90)	9.650 (93)	30.525
89	(Uzbekistan)	Rano Muhamedova	10.225 (82)	9.225 (104)	10.950 (86)	8.125 (107)	30.400
90	(Turkey)	Tugce Oylumlu	9.825 (93)	10.200 (82)	10.325 (95)	9.375 (97)	30.250
91	(Brazil)	Luisa Marumi Matsuo	10.125 (85)	9.825 (92)	10.275 (96)	9.300 (98)	30.225
92	(Finland)	Silja Ahonen	10.100 (86)	10.025 (89)	9.950 (99)	10.025 (85)	30.150
93	(Slovenia)	Andrea Zegarac	10.275 (81)	9.500 (98)		10.300 (76)	30.075
94	(Australia)	Ayiesha Naazmi Johnston	9.500 (99)	10.100 (84)		10.325 (75)	29.925
95	(Chinese Taipei)	Pei-Yi Wu	9.800 (94)	8.450 (107)	10.000 (98)	9.850 (88)	29.650
96	(Norway)	Lise Osteby	9.975 (91)	10.025 (88)	9.625 (102)	9.550 (94)	29.625
97	(Sweden)	Amanda Gunnesson	8.400 (104)	9.850 (91)	9.825 (100)	9.725 (92)	29.400
98	(Australia)	Amy Khera	9.575 (98)	9.275 (103)	10.200 (97)	9.525 (95)	29.300
99	(Sweden)	Ekaterina Rublevskaja	8.775 (102)	9.400 (101)	10.475 (92)	9.125 (101)	29.000
100	(Estonia)	Anna Jardova	9.475 (100)	9.600 (95)	9.750 (101)	8.550 (104)	28.825
101	(Belarus)	Svetlana Rudalova			14.150 (14)	14.050 (15)	28.200
102	(Thailand)	Phayonrut Ploychompu	9.125 (101)	9.575 (96)	9.325 (103)	8.175 (106)	28.025
103	(Chinese Taipei)	Hui-Mei Wang	8.725 (103)	9.700 (94)	9.075 (104)	9.125 (100)	27.900
104	(Norway)	Martine Munkvold	8.200 (106)	9.700 (93)	8.650 (107)	9.250 (99)	27.600
105	(Cape Verde)	Jennifer Ramos	8.250 (105)	8.975 (105)	9.025 (105)	8.650 (103)	26.650
106	(Israel)	Katerina Pisetsky			13.100 (25)	13.200 (20)	26.300
107	(Andorra)	Jastina Armengol Hierro	7.850 (107)	8.775 (106)	8.750 (106)	8.475 (105)	26.000
108	(South Korea)	Kang Min-jee	10.725 (67)		11.725 (56)		22.450
109	(Poland)	Alexandra Szutenberg		10.635 (73)	11.375 (72)		22.000
110	(Poland)	Anna Zdun	10.575 (74)			11.350 (52)	21.925
111	(United States)	Brennan Stacker			11.000 (84)	9.950 (86)	20.950
112	(South Korea)	Yoo Seong-oeun		10.600 (75)		9.750 (90)	20.350
113	(United States)	Aline Bakchajian	10.075 (88)	10.225 (80)			20.300
114	(South Africa)	Shalene Arnold	9.775 (95)		10.350 (94)		20.125
115	(Australia)	Amelia McVeigh			10.550 (91)	9.375 (96)	19.925
116	(South Africa)	Tasneem Falconer		9.350 (102)		8.675 (102)	18.025
117	(India)	Komal Ishwer Nahar		5.650 (108)	5.475 (108)	5.775 (108)	16.900
118	(Russia)	Svetlana Putintseva		15.850 (5)			15,850
119	(India)	Surekha Rana	5.200 (108)	5.200 (109)	5.200 (109)		15.600
120	(India)	Rajani Sharma	4.900 (109)		4.850 (110)	5.700 (109)	15.450
121	(India)	Jasan Deep Kaur	4.700 (110)	5.075 (110)		5.150 (110)	14.925
122	(Japan)	Mai Hidaka	12.350 (33)				12.350
123	(Spain)	Carolina Rodriguez				11.575 (47)	11.575
124	(Slovenia)	Spela Gala			11.175 (78)		11.175
125	(Italy)	Paola Bianchetti	11.175 (54)				11.175

=== Team All-Around ===
Place	Nation	Rope	Ball	Clubs	Ribbon	Total
1	Russia	48.875 (1)	49.625 (1)	48.150 (1)	50.000 (1)	166,025
2	Ukraine	45.825 (2)	44.900 (3)	47.025 (2)	46.325 (2)	157,175
3	Belarus	43.375 (3)	46.200 (2)	43.325 (4)	43.925 (3)	148,925
4	Bulgaria	43.050 (4)	42.325 (4)	43.475 (3)	42.650 (4)	145,175
5	Azerbaijan	40.025 (5)	41.550 (5)	41.225 (5)	42.375 (5)	141,350
6	Spain	38.350 (7)	40.300 (6)	40.075 (6)	38.775 (7)	134,475
7	Kazakhstan	36.325 (9)	39.950 (7)	39.000 (7)	39.650 (6)	132,925
8	Japan	38.725 (6)	37.200 (8)	38.800 (8)	37.600 (9)	128,700
9	Israel	34.750 (14)	37.175 (9)	38.750 (9)	38.325 (8)	127.775
10	Italy	37.725 (8)	37.100 (10)	37.700 (10)	36.600 (12)	126.600
11	Poland	35.250 (11)	36.000 (12)	37.350 (11)	36.625 (11)	124,025
12	France	36.200 (10)	35.950 (13)	36.775(13)	37.000(10)	122,975
13	China	34.750 (14)	36.175(11)	36.700 (14)	33.200 (16)	119.750
14	Canada	34.950 (12)	36.175(11)	36.700 (14)	33.200(16)	119.600
15	Slovenia	34.900 (13)	32.775(19)	36.525(15)	32.275 (18)	116,875
16	(Georgia (country)) Georgia	31.400 (26)	34.250 (15)	36.800(12)	33.300(14)	115,375
17	South Korea	33.250 (19)	34.225(16)	35.800 (17)	30.825 (25)	114.100
18	Uzbekistan	32.950 (20)	32.200 (23)	34.975(19)	30.575(26)	113.350
19	Turkey	30.575 (28)	33.850 (17)	34.450 (23)	33.300 (14)	112.975
20	Latvia	32.775 (21)	33.125 (18)	34.875 (20)	32.725 (17)	112.800
21	Malaysia	33.275 (18)	32.550 (22)	35.875 (16)	31.875 (21)	112.775
22	United States	32.625 (23)	32.625 (21)	34.850 (21)	32.075 (20)	112.150
23	Finland	33.575 (17)	31.975 (24)	34.350(25)	32.100 (19)	112,025
24	Portugal	32.725 (22)	32.725 (20)	34.825 (22)	31.475 (22)	111.675
25	Hungary	34.000 (16)	30.175 (28)	34.450 (23)	31.225 (23)	110.850
26	Estonia	32.375 (24)	30.675 (27)	33.400 (26)	31.125 (24)	109.550
27	South Africa	31.975 (25)	29.275 (30)	32.725 (27)	29.725 (28)	105.675
28	Brazil	31.050 (27)	31.550 (25)	32.475 (28)	29.175 (30)	105.125
29	Australia	30.125 (29)	30.775(26)	31.925 (29)	29.925 (27)	103.400
30	Sweden	28.000 (30)	29.650 (29)	31.800 (30)	29.925 (27)	102.200
31	India	14.800 (31)	15.925 (31)	15.525 (31)	16.625 (31)	53.325

=== Individual All-Around ===
Rank	Nation	Name	Rope (rhythmic gymnastics)	Ball (rhythmic gymnastics)	Clubs (rhythmic gymnastics)	Ribbon (rhythmic gymnastics)	Total
1	(Russia)	Olga Kapranova	16.650 (1)	17.175 (1)	15.800 (4)	16.725 (1)	66,350
2	(Ukraine)	Anna Bessonova	16.575 (2)	16.325 (4)	16.650 (1)	16.150 (3)	65,700
3	(Russia)	Irina Tchachina	16.500 (3)	16.500 (2)	15.825 (3)	16.600 (2)	65,425
4	(Ukraine)	Natalia Godunko	15.650 (4)	16.475 (3)	15.900 (2)	15.675 (4)	63,700
5	(Belarus)	Inna Zhukova	15.275 (6)	15.875 (5)	15.325 (6)	15.000 (8)	61,475
6	(Bulgaria)	Simona Peycheva	15.550 (5)	15.225 (7)	15.500 (5)	15.175 (6)	61,450
7	(Kazakhstan)	Aliya Yusupova	14.350 (9)	15.800 (6)	14.675 (7)	15.100 (7)	59,925
8	(Azerbaijan)	Anna Gurbanova	14.425 (7)	15.150 (9)	14.600 (8)	14.400 (11)	58,575
9	(Azerbaijan)	Dinara Gimatova	13.475 (15)	14.575 (11)	14.500 (10)	15.500 (5)	58,050
10	(Bulgaria)	Elizabeth Paisieva	14.375 (8)	14.350 (12)	14.575 (9)	14.425 (10)	57,725
11	(Spain)	Almudena Cid	13.675 (13)	14.650 (10)	14.125 (13)	14.500 (9)	56,950
12	(Belarus)	Liubov Charkashyna	14.100 (10)	15.175 (8)	14.350 (11)	12.650 (18)	56,275
13	(Israel)	Irina Risenson	13.325 (16)	14.350 (12)	13.525 (16)	14.375 (12)	55,575
14	(Italy)	Julieta Cantaluppi	13.525 (14)	14.025 (14)	13.900 (14)	13.500 (14)	54,950
15	(Japan)	Yukari Murata	13.850 (12)	13.375 (17)	14.225 (12)	13.100 (16)	54,550
16	(Czech Republic)	Dominika Červenková	14.025 (11)	12.500 (21)	13.550 (13)	13.525 (13)	53,600
17	(Spain)	Jenifer Colino	13.225 (18)	13.200 (18)	13.450 (17)	13.125 (15)	53,000
18	(Canada)	Alexandra Orlando	12.850 (19)	13.475 (16)	13.375 (19)	12.950 (17)	52,650
19	(China)	Yiming Xiao	12.700 (22)	13.825 (15)	13.175 (20)	11.875 (22)	51,575
20	(Finland)	Maria Ringinen	12.825 (21)	12.325 (22)	13.025 (21)	12.125 (12)	50,300
21	(Poland)	Joanna Mitrosz	12.200 (23)	12.625 (20)	12.700 (23)	12.600 (19)	50,125
22	(Slovenia)	Mojca Rode	13.250 (17)	11.925 (23)	13.400 (18)	11.425 (24)	50,000
23	(Poland)	Magdalena Markowska	11.975 (24)	12.975 (19)	12.675 (24)	11.850 (23)	49,475
24	(France)	Delphine Ledoux	12.850 (19)	11.050 (24)	12.900 (22)	12.425 (20)	49,225

=== Individual Rope ===
Place	Nation	Name	Result
1	(Russia)	Olga Kapranova	16,925
2	(Ukraine)	Anna Bessonova	16,350
3	(Russia)	Irina Tchachina	16,300
4	(Ukraine)	Natalia Godunko	15,625
5	(Belarus)	Inna Zhukova	15,400
6	(Bulgaria)	Simona Peycheva	15,375
7	(Azerbaijan)	Anna Gurbanova	14,450
8	(Bulgaria)	Elizabeth Paisieva	13,850

=== Individual Ball ===
Place	Nation	Name	Result
1	(Russia)	Olga Kapranova	17,375
2	(Ukraine)	Anna Bessonova	16,900
3	(Belarus)	Inna Zhukova	16,675
4	(Russia)	Irina Tchachina	16,600
5	(Ukraine)	Natalia Godunko	16,225
6	(Azerbaijan)	Anna Gurbanova	15,675
7	(Bulgaria)	Simona Peycheva	15,375
8	(Belarus)	Liubov Charkashyna	15,100

=== Individual Clubs ===
Place	Nation	Name	Result
1	(Russia)	Olga Kapranova	16,775
2	(Ukraine)	Anna Bessonova	16,550
3	(Russia)	Irina Tchachina	16,400
4	(Ukraine)	Natalia Godunko	15,600
5	(Belarus)	Inna Zhukova	15,575
6	(Bulgaria)	Simona Peycheva	15,075
7	(Kazakhstan)	Aliya Yusupova	14,975
8	(Spain)	Almudena Cid	14,500

=== Individual Ribbon ===
Place	Nation	Name	Result
1	(Russia)	Vera Sessina	17,075
2	(Ukraine)	Anna Bessonova	16,525
3	(Ukraine)	Natalia Godunko	16,325
4	(Russia)	Olga Kapranova	15,925
5	(Belarus)	Inna Zhukova	15,750
6	(Kazakhstan)	Aliya Yusupova	15,550
7	(Azerbaijan)	Dinara Gimatova	15,500
8	(Bulgaria)	Simona Peycheva	15,050

== Groups ==
=== Group compositions ===
Azerbaijan (AZE)

- (Azerbaijan) Anna Bitieva
- (Azerbaijan) Dina Gorina
- (Azerbaijan) Anastasia Prasolova
- (Azerbaijan) Alina Trepina
- (Azerbaijan) Valeria Yegay

Belarus (BLR)

- (Belarus) Alexandrina Barysevich
- (Belarus) Yavhenia Burlo
- (Belarus) Vera Davidovich
- (Belarus) Dzina Haitiukevich
- (Belarus) Zinaida Lunina
- (Belarus) Hlafira Martsinovich

Brazil (BRA)

- (Brazil) Nickolle Abreu
- (Brazil) Larissa Evangelista
- (Brazil) Luciane Hammes
- (Brazil) Marcela Menezes
- (Brazil) Nicole Muller
- (Brazil) Natalia Sanchez

Bulgaria (BUL)

- (Bulgaria) Iordanka Andonova
- (Bulgaria) Eleonora Kezhova
- (Bulgaria) Zornitsa Marinova
- (Bulgaria) Kristina Ranguelova
- (Bulgaria) Joanna Tancheva
- (Bulgaria) Tatiana Tongova

China (CHN)

- (China) Tao Chou
- (China) Jian-Shuang Sui
- (China) Wang Xuemei
- (China) Zhang Ying
- (China) Dan Zhu
- (China) Li Zou

Czech Republic (CZE)

- (Czech Republic) Gabriela Hoferova
- (Czech Republic) Katerina Janeckova
- (Czech Republic) Zuzana Kubalova
- (Czech Republic) Zuzana Valkova
- (Czech Republic) Veronika Zasterova
- (Czech Republic) Renata Zmolikova

Spain (ESP)

- (Spain) Barbara Gonzalez
- (Spain) Lara Gonzalez
- (Spain) Marta Linares
- (Spain) Isabel Pagan
- (Spain) Ana Pelaz
- (Spain) Nuria Velasco

Finland (FIN)

- (Finland) Alisa Halinen
- (Finland) Nina Hanhela
- (Finland) Rina Maatta
- (Finland) Janette Salovaara
- (Finland) Jasmina Salovaara

France (FRA)

- (France) Stéphanie Arnoux
- (France) Perrine David
- (France) Laura Gatignol
- (France) Clara Huet
- (France) Aurélia Le Gallo

Germany (GER)

- (Germany) Tina Giese
- (Germany) Stephanie Loesch
- (Germany) Olga Lukjanow
- (Germany) Olena Novichkova
- (Germany) Juliane Weigel

Greece (GRE)

- (Greece) Ilektra Elli Efthymiou
- (Greece) Maria Kakiou
- (Greece) Marianthi Michtari
- (Greece) Olga Nikolaidou
- (Greece) Evmorfia Ntona
- (Greece) Olga Afrodhi Pilaqi

Italy (ITA)

- (Italy) Elisa Blanchi
- (Italy) Fabrizia D’Ottavio
- (Italy) Marinella Falca
- (Italy) Daniela Masseroni
- (Italy) Elisa Santoni
- (Italy) Laura Vernizzi

Japan (JPN)

- (Japan) Mai Hidaka
- (Japan) Ayumi Higashikawa
- (Japan) Mimi Inoue
- (Japan) Risa Kojo
- (Japan) Yuria Onuki
- (Japan) Mariko Takahashi

Kazakhstan (KAZ)

- (Kazakhstan) Elvira Garifullina
- (Kazakhstan) Yulia Ilchenko
- (Kazakhstan) Elena Panchenko
- (Kazakhstan) Ekaterina Smirnova
- (Kazakhstan) Lola Yeros

South Korea (KOR)

- (South Korea) Byun Sang-mi
- (South Korea) Han A-leum
- (South Korea) Hong Sung-eun
- (South Korea) Kim A-hyeon
- (South Korea) Kim Su-young
- (South Korea) Park Soo-gyeong

New Zealand (NZL)

- (New Zealand) Claire Broadbent
- (New Zealand) Amanda Judd
- (New Zealand) Katie Pearce
- (New Zealand) Kate Ronaldson
- (New Zealand) Germaine Tang
- (New Zealand) Leilani Van Dieren

Poland (POL)

- (Poland) Justyna Banasiak
- (Poland) Martyna Dabkowska
- (Poland) Anna Gorna
- (Poland) Agata Kasyna
- (Poland) Malgorzata Lawrynowicz
- (Poland) Alexandra Wojcik

North Korea (PRK)

- (North Korea) Choe Ryon
- (North Korea) Mun Song-mi
- (North Korea) O Song-hui
- (North Korea) Pak Nam-suk
- (North Korea) Ri Kyong-hui

Russia

- (Russia) Olesia Beluguina
- (Russia) Olesia Byk
- (Russia) Olga Glatskikh
- (Russia) Tatiana Kurbakova
- (Russia) Liubov Popova

Switzerland (SUI)

- (Switzerland) Joanie Ecuyer
- (Switzerland) Karen Kalbermatten
- (Switzerland) Fanny Perret
- (Switzerland) Alessia Pfeiffer
- (Switzerland) Janine Strasser
- (Switzerland) Lisa Tacchelli

Ukraine (UKR)

- (Ukraine) Anastasia Bich
- (Ukraine) Polina Kandaurova
- (Ukraine) Inga Kozhokhina
- (Ukraine) Oksana Paslas
- (Ukraine) Victoria Zubchenko

=== Group All-Around ===
Place	Nation	5 Ribbons	3 Hoops, 2 Clubs	Total
1	Russia	14.675 (1)	14.600 (2)	29,275
2	Italy	14.250 (2)	14.475 (3)	28,725
3	Belarus	13.600 (4)	14.675 (1)	28,275
4	Bulgaria	13.725 (3)	14.200 (4)	27,925
5	Greece	11.675 (7)	13.275 (5)	24,950
6	Ukraine	11.800 (6)	13.075 (6)	24,875
7	Spain	11.150 (10)	12.550 (7)	23,700
8	Germany	11.200 (9)	12.100 (9)	23,300
9	Japan	12.275 (5)	10.975 (12)	23,250
10	China	10.800 (12)	12.325 (8)	23,125
11	Azerbaijan	11.525 (8)	11.225 (11)	22,750
12	Switzerland	11.075 (11)	10.900 (15)	21,975
13	Kazakhstan	10.300 (14)	10.775 (16)	21,075
14	France	10.700 (13)	10.125 (18)	20,825
15	North Korea	9.350 (17)	11.275 (10)	20,625
16	Poland	9.375 (16)	10.950 (14)	20,325
17	Brazil	9.250 (18)	10.950 (13)	20,200
18	Czech Republic	8.550 (19)	10.300 (17)	18,850
19	Finland	9.850 (15)	7.950 (20)	17,800
20	South Korea	8.075 (20)	8.575 (19)	16,650
21	New Zealand	7.025 (21)	7.750 (21)	14,775

=== Groups Final 5 Ribbons ===
Place	Nation	Total
1	Bulgaria	14,475
2	Italy	14,150
3	Russia	13,900
4	Belarus	13,225
5	Greece	12,600
6	Japan	12,550
7	Ukraine	11,200
8	Azerbaijan	10,650

=== Groups Final 3 Hoops + 2 Clubs ===
Place	Nation	Total
1	Italy	15,675
2	Russia	15,150
3	Belarus	14,825
4	Bulgaria	14,600
5	Ukraine	13,450
6	Spain	12,550
7	China	12,000
8	Greece	11,450

== Medal table ==
Rank	Nation	Gold	Silver	Bronze	Total
1	Russia	7	1	4	12
2	Italy	1	2	0	3
3	Bulgaria	1	0	0	1
4	Ukraine	0	6	1	7
5	Belarus	0	0	4	4
Totals (5 entries)		9	9	9	27
