= Clara Huet =

French rhythmic gymnast, model and actress (born 1989)

- Born: 5 September 1989 (age 36); Charenton-le-Pont, France
- Occupations: Actress; model; rhythmic gymnast
- Years active: early 2000s-present
- Known for: Christ(off), Joséphine, ange gardien, Caïn (TV series)

Clara Huet (born 5 September 1989) is a former French rhythmic gymnast, model and actress.

Huet is mainly known for her roles in Christ(off), Vénéneuses et Caïn.

== Biography ==
Huet was born in Charenton-le-Pont in the department of Val-de-Marne. She spent her childhood in the town of Lésigny. Educated at the elementary school Villarceau, she then joined the college of Hyverneaux.

At the age of ten, she began training in rhythmic and sports gymnastics. In 2003, her performances led her to be chosen to be part of the pole of Évry to then integrate the junior national team. In 2005 Clara, along Stéphanie Arnoux, Perrine David, Laura Gatignol and Aurélia Le Gallo, competed at the World Championships in Baku, taking 14th place overall. In 2006 Huet, Nathalie Fauquette, Laura Gatignol, Aurélie Lacour and Ketty Martel, took 6th place in the All-Around and 8th with 5 ribbons at the European Championships in Moscow. At the 2007 World Championships in Patras the French group (Clara, Nathalie Fauquette, Julie Gournay, Aurélie Lacour, Ketty Martel and Jessica Pantieri) was 16th in the All-Around and 8th with 5 ropes. She then competed in the selection for the 2008 Beijing Olympics.

Huet then left gymnastics to start an acting career. In 2010, she trained at the Pygmalion studio in Paris. A few months later, she landed the lead role in the episode Un petit coin de paradis of the series Joséphine, ange gardien.

Huet then began theatrical training at the Jean Périmony school in 2011, then joined the Mugler Follies, a cabaret show in December 2013. In parallel, she pursued a career in modeling that she had started a few years earlier.

In 2015 she played Roxane in the play Cyrano de Bergerac at the Théâtre 14 Jean-Marie Serreau in Paris. That same year, she played Candice, the mistress of Valentin Zuycker, in season 3 of the series Caïn.

In 2018, she starred in the comedy Christ(off), created by Pierre Dudan, where she stars along Michaël Youn, Bernard Le Coq and Victoria Bedos.

In December 2020 she portrayed Madame de Montespan in the 4th season of the show La Guerre des trônes, la véritable histoire de l'Europe.

In 2020 and 2021, she played several historical female figures in the reenactment scenes of the show Secrets d'Histoire made by Stéphane Bern (Agrippina the Younger, Elisabeth of Bavaria...).

== Theater ==
- 2015 : Cyrano de Bergerac by Edmond Rostand, directed by Henri Lazarini (Théâtre 14)
- 2016 : La Rivière d'après by Jez Butterworth, directed by Jérémie Lippmann (Comédie des Champs-Élysées)
- 2017 : #JeSuisLeProchain by Mickaël Délis, directed by Mickaël Délis
- 2024 : Pauvre Bitos ou le Dîner de têtes by Jean Anouilh, directed by Thierry Harcourt, théâtre Hébertot

== Filmography ==
=== Cinema ===
- 2017 : Vénéneuses: Julia
- 2018 : Christ(off): Marie-Madeleine

=== Television ===
==== TV shows ====
- 2011 : Le Jour où tout a basculé: Vahina (season 1, episode Règlement de compte à mon travail)
- 2011 : Joséphine, ange gardien: Sophie (season 13 episode Un petit coin de paradis)
- 2013 : Petits secrets entre voisins: Charlène (season 1, episode 5)
- 2015 : Caïn: Candice (season 3, episodes 7 et 8)
- 2022 : Un si grand soleil: Aurore Verneuil

==== Secrets d'Histoire ====
- 2020 : Agrippine: tu seras un monstre, mon fils...: Agrippina the Younger
- 2020 : Vauban, le roi et les forteresses: Jeanne d’Osnay
- 2020 : Guillaume le Conquérant: Mathilde
- 2020 : La Duchesse de Berry, une rebelle chez les Bourbons: Madame de Kersabiec
- 2020 : Beethoven, tout pour la musique: Cantatrice
- 2021 : Néron, le tyran de Rome: Agrippina the Younger
- 2021 : Élisabeth, la drôle de reine de Belgique: Elisabeth of Bavaria

==== La Guerre des trônes, la véritable histoire de l'Europe ====
- 2020 : La Guerre des trônes, la véritable histoire de l'Europe (season 4): Athénaïs de Montespan
