= 2004 European Rhythmic Gymnastics Championships =

2004 Rhythmic Gymnastics European Championships
- Location: Kyiv, Ukraine
- Start date: 4 June 2004
- End date: 6 June 2004

The 20th Rhythmic Gymnastics European Championships were held in Kyiv, Ukraine, from June 4 to 6, 2004.

27 national teams participated in the championships. Medals were contested in two disciplines: team and individual all-round. Alina Kabaeva became for the fifth time in a row European champion in individual all-around and Russia – for the third time in a row European team champion. The winner of the medal tally was Russia with two gold and one bronze medals.

It was the first major rhythmic gymnastics competition which was contested in Ukraine.

== Medal winners ==
Event	Gold	Silver	Bronze
Senior Individual Finals
All-around	Alina Kabaeva; Russia	Anna Bessonova; Ukraine	Irina Tchachina; Russia
Senior Groups Finals
All-around	Russia; Alina Kabaeva; Irina Tchachina	Ukraine; Anna Bessonova; Natalia Godunko; Tamara Yerofeeva	Belarus; Inna Zhukova; Valeria Kurylskaya; Svetlana Rudalova

== Results ==
=== Individual all-around ===
Rank	Gymnast	Nation	Rope (rhythmic gymnastics)	Ball (rhythmic gymnastics)	Clubs (rhythmic gymnastics)	Ribbon (rhythmic gymnastics)	Total
1st place, gold medalist(s)	Alina Kabaeva	Russia	26.850	26.725	26.825	26.225	106.625
2nd place, silver medalist(s)	Anna Bessonova	Ukraine	26.900	26.050	26.875	24.600	104.425
3rd place, bronze medalist(s)	Irina Tchachina	Russia	25.475	24.600	26.275	25.425	101.775
4	Natalia Godunko	Ukraine	26.100	24.575	25.975	23.550	100.200
5	Inna Zhukova	Belarus	24.575	24.500	24.575	23.950	97.600
6	Eleni Andriola	Greece	24.600	23.525	24.250	23.125	95.500
7	Almudena Cid Tostado	Spain	23.250	24.475	23.100	22.300	93.125
8	Theodora Pallidou	Greece	23.500	22.525	23.000	22.750	91.775
9	Svetlana Rudalova	Belarus	24.450	23.500	20.050	23.025	91.025
10	Dinara Gimatova	Azerbaijan	21.900	22.500	22.025	20.525	86.950
11	Katerina Pisetsky	Israel	22.150	21.750	21.975	21.000	86.875
12	Jennifer Colino	Spain	23.000	20.300	22.450	20.825	86.575
13	Lisa Ingildeeva	Germany	22.300	21.450	21.500	21.025	86.275
14	Laura Zacchilli	Italy	22.050	21.500	21.475	20.800	85.825
15	Anna Gurbanova	Azerbaijan	21.075	21.725	21.575	21.100	85.475
16	Magdalena Markowska	Poland	20.975	20.775	21.825	20.150	83.725
17	Irina Kikkas	Estonia	21.025	20.825	20.650	20.150	82.650
18	Joanna Mitrosz	Poland	20.250	20.675	20.875	19.250	81.050
19	Dominika Červenková	Czech Republic	21.650	20.350	19.925	19.075	81.000
20	Maria Ringinen	Finland	21.075	20.475	20.175	18.500	80.225
21	Delphine Ledoux	France	19.925	19.625	20.350	19.575	79.475
22	Hannah McKibbin	Great Britain	20.250	20.600	20.050	17.575	78.475
23	Maya Paunovska	Bulgaria	19.775	19.475	18.950	17.175	75.375
24	Susanna Marchesi	Italy	19.075	18.100	19.275	17.850	74.300
25	Kateřina Kopáčová	Czech Republic	18.450	18.675	19.425	17.575	74.125
26	Elizabeth Paisieva (Note: After two rounds Elizabeth Paisieva withdrew due to an injury.)	Bulgaria	21.825			20.375	42.200

=== Group all-around ===
Rank	Team	Rope (rhythmic gymnastics)	Ball (rhythmic gymnastics)	Clubs (rhythmic gymnastics)	Ribbon (rhythmic gymnastics)	Total
1st place, gold medalist(s)	Russia	51.850	54.025	52.650	49.875	208.400
2nd place, silver medalist(s)	Ukraine	51.900	50.575	51.425	46.650	200.550
3rd place, bronze medalist(s)	Belarus	47.925	48.400	47.125	46.325	189.775
4	Greece	45.700	45.750	45.875	43.775	181.100
5	Spain	44.200	45.950	45.250	43.200	178.600
6	Azerbaijan	45.250	46.700	43.550	41.800	177.300
7	Bulgaria	42.625	42.300	43.450	41.825	170.200
8	Poland	42.950	42.850	42.650	38.200	166.650
9	Germany	41.425	43.500	41.450	39.825	166.200
10	Czech Republic	40.775	41.300	42.800	39.875	164.750
11	Italy	41.825	40.925	42.375	39.325	164.450
12	Israel	40.950	41.650	41.650	39.025	163.275
13	Great Britain	40.625	40.525	40.175	38.675	160.000
14	France	41.700	39.875	39.175	38.625	159.375
15	Estonia	39.875	39.875	39.475	38.325	157.550
16	Finland	38.350	40.325	39.775	37.525	155.975
17	Slovenia	39.250	38.100	40.300	36.500	154.150
18	Austria	38.575	35.850	39.825	34.450	148.700
19	Turkey	38.300	35.975	38.475	34.575	147.325
20	Hungary	36.450	34.825	38.575	35.225	145.075
21	Cyprus	35.025	37.725	35.650	33.550	141.950
22	Netherlands	35.375	35.575	37.375	31.750	140.075
23	Portugal	33.350	34.950	34.775	34.375	137.450
24	Moldova	34.850	36.150	32.700	33.100	136.800
25	Slovakia	33.325	34.050	34.150	30.650	132.175
26	Lithuania	29.775	30.400	30.275	31.750	122.200
27	Sweden	28.625	28.725	30.600	27.400	115.350

== Medal table ==
* Host nation (Ukraine)

Rank	Nation	Gold	Silver	Bronze	Total
1	Russia (RUS)	2	0	1	3
2	Ukraine (UKR)*	0	2	0	2
3	Belarus (BLR)	0	0	1	1
Totals (3 entries)		2	2	2	6
