= Rajani Sharma =

Indian rhythmic gymnast

- Born: 10 January 1984 (age 42) India
- Height: 162 cm (5 ft 4 in)

Gymnastics career
- Discipline: Rhythmic gymnastics
- Country represented: India
- Head coach: Neetu Bala

Rajani Sharma (born 10 January 1984) is a retired Indian rhythmic gymnast. She represented her country in international competitions.

== Biography ==
In 2003 Rajani debuted at the World Cup in Baku. In December she became the national champion of India. In April 2004 she again competed at the World Cup in Azerbaijan's capital.

In 2005 she was selected for the World Championships in Baku. There she took 31st place in teams, along Jasan Deep Kaur, Komal Ishwer Nahar and Surekha Rana, 120th place in the All-Around, 109th with rope, 110th with clubs and 109th with ribbon.

A year later Sharma was selected for the Commonwealth Games in Melbourne where she placed 7th in teams and 26th in the All-Around.
