= Mariko Takahashi =

Mariko Takahashi may refer to:

- Mariko Takahashi (singer) (高橋 真梨子; born 1949), Japanese singer
- Mariko Takahashi (model and actress) (高橋 マリ子; born 1984), Japanese model and actress
- Mariko Takahashi (gymnast) (高橋 麻理子; born 1988), Japanese gymnast
- Mariko "Mari" Takahashi, American YouTuber
