= Maria Ringinen =

Finnish rhythmic gymnast

- Born: 24 April 1988 (age 38) Tallinn, then part of Estonian SSR, Soviet Union
- Height: 160 cm (5 ft 3 in)

Gymnastics career
- Discipline: Rhythmic gymnastics
- Country represented: Finland (2001-2008)
- Club: Elise Gymnastics
- Head coaches: Laura Ahonen, Terhi Toivanen.
- Retired: yes

Maria Ringinen (born 24 April 1988) is a retired Finnish rhythmic gymnast. She represented Finland in international competitions.

== Career ==
Ringinen took up gymnastics at age five, in 2001 and 2002 she was the Finnish national junior champion. In 2003 she became a senior, winning the national title in the All-Around and all the four apparatuses. She was then selected for the World Championships in Budapest, taking 26th place overall.

In 2004 she retained all the national titles, in June she was 20th in the All-Around at the European Championships in Kyiv. At the 2005 national championships she won the All-Around and all the event finals. At the European Championships in Moscow she took 22nd place overall. She was then selected for the World Championships in Baku, being 23rd in teams and 24th in the All-Around.

After winning again all the titles at nationals, she was incorporated into the group for the European Championships where Finland was 14th in the All-Around. In 2007 she retained her national titles and, in April, competed at the World Cup in Portimão where she was 24th. At the European Championships in Baku, she took 17th place in teams along Julia Huuhtanen. She was selected for the World Championships in Patras, being 23rd in teams and 42nd in the All-Around and thus missing the Olympic qualification quota.

In 2008 she was crowned Finnish champion in the All-Around, with hoop and with ball, winning silver with rope and ribbon. She announced the decision to retire in March, the decision was influenced by her disqualification from the Beijing Olympics and the suspicion that there would not be enough high-quality coaching in Finland to continue her career.
