= Elizaveta Aleksandrova =

Russian rhythmic gymnast

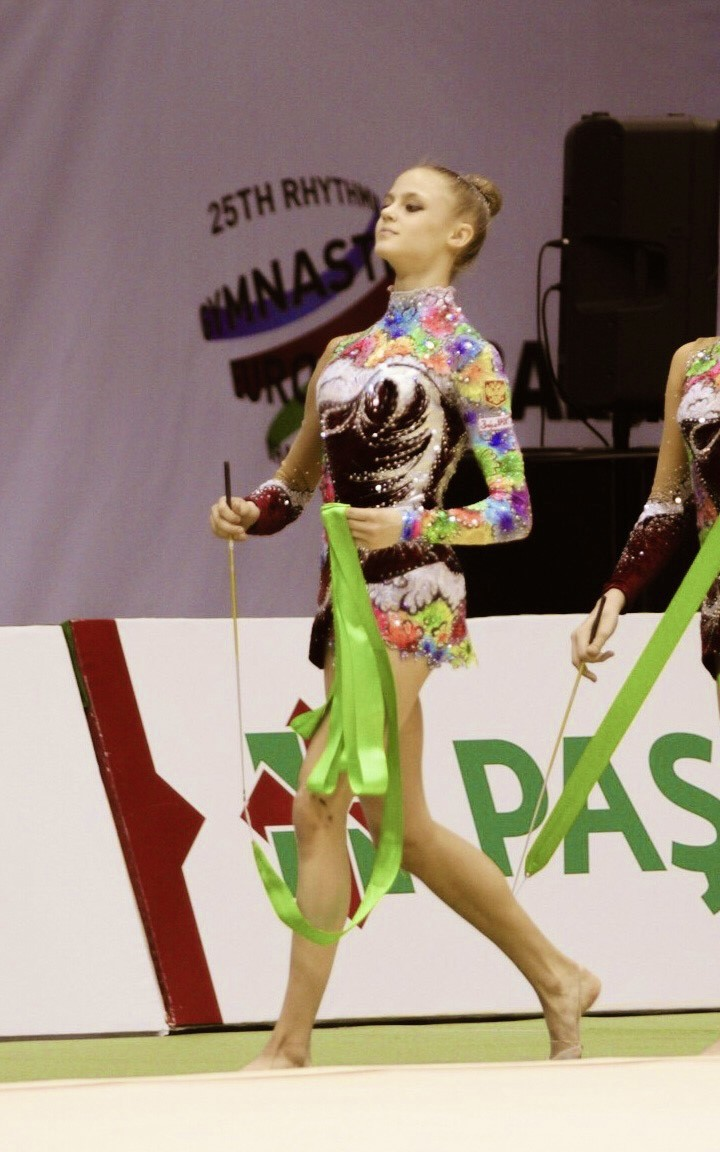

Personal information
- Full name: Elizaveta Sergeevna Alexandrova
- Born: 5 February 1994 (age 32) Krasnodar

Gymnastics career
- Discipline: Rhythmic gymnastics
- Country represented: Russia (2008-2010)
- Gym: Novogorsk
- Head coach: Irina Viner
- Assistant coach: Tatiana Sergaeva
- Choreographer: Tatiana Pomerantseva
- Retired: yes
Medal record
Representing Russia
Junior European Championships
| Gold medal – first place | 2009 Baku | 5 Ribbons |

Elizaveta Sergeevna Aleksandrova (born 5 February 1994) is a retired Russian rhythmic gymnast. She was a junior group European Champion in 2009.

== Personal life ==
Elizaveta is married to former basketball player Aleksey Savrasenko. They had a son in 2021 and another in 2023.

== Biography ==
Aleksandrova grew up training with Irina Mikhailenko. In 2008, at the Russian Championships in Dmitrov, she took third place in the team category and was invited by IrinaViner-Usmanova to the selections for the Russian junior group. From 2008 to 2010 Elizaveta was part of the national junior group under the guidance of Tatyana Sergaeva.

In 2009 she won gold overall at the World Cups in Budapest and Portimão. In May she competed at the European Championships in Baku along Olga Ilina, Daria Izotova, Valeria Kartasheva, Ekaterina Mokhnatkina and Olga Raspopina. They won All-Around gold in the junior groups competition. After that achievement she was awarded the title of International Master of Sport.

In 2011, as a member of the team from the Southern Federal District, she ranked 4th at the Russian Championships in the team category. She retired in 2013 because of a relapse of a serious injury she got after the Euros in 2009.

After finishing her racing career, she leads sports camps and masterclasses in Russia. She also worked at the State Museum of Sport at the Ministry of Sports of the Russian Federation.

In 2020 Elizaveta graduated in International Sports Management and Marketing at the Higher School of Economics.
