= Andriola =

Andriola is a surname. Notable people with the surname include:

- Alfred Andriola (1912–1983), American cartoonist
- Eleni Andriola (born 1986), Greek rhythmic gymnast
