= Zhang Ying (gymnast) =

Chinese rhythmic gymnast

Zhang Ying (born 12 February 1988) is a Chinese group rhythmic gymnast. She competed at the 2005 World Rhythmic Gymnastics Championships.
