= 2004 FIG Rhythmic Gymnastics World Cup Final =

International rhythmic gymnastics competition

The 2004 FIG Rhythmic Gymnastics World Cup Final was the sixth edition of the Rhythmic Gymnastics World Cup Final, held from November 27 to November 28, 2004 in Moscow, Russia. The competition was officially organized by the International Gymnastics Federation as the last stage of a series of competitions through the 2003–2004 season.

== Medalists ==
| Event | Gold | Silver | Bronze | Ref. |
| Hoop | (Russia) Alina Kabaeva | (Bulgaria) Simona Peycheva | (Russia) Olga Kapranova | |
| Ball | (Russia) Irina Tchachina | (Kazakhstan) Aliya Yusupova | (Belarus) Inna Zhukova | |
| Clubs | (Russia) Irina Tchachina | (Kazakhstan) Aliya Yusupova | (Russia) Olga Kapranova | |
| Ribbon | (Russia) Alina Kabaeva | (Bulgaria) Simona Peycheva | (Russia) Olga Kapranova | |
| Group 5 Ribbons | Russia | Poland | Finland | |
| Group 2 Balls, 3 Hoops | Russia | Poland | Finland | |

== Medal table ==
| Rank | Nation | Gold | Silver | Bronze | Total |
|---|---|---|---|---|---|
| 1 | Russia (RUS) | 6 | 0 | 3 | 9 |
| 2 | Bulgaria (BUL) | 0 | 2 | 0 | 2 |
| 2 | Kazakhstan (KAZ) | 0 | 2 | 0 | 2 |
| 2 | Poland (POL) | 0 | 2 | 0 | 2 |
| 5 | Finland (FIN) | 0 | 0 | 2 | 2 |
| 6 | Belarus (BLR) | 0 | 0 | 1 | 1 |
| Totals (6 entries) | | 6 | 6 | 6 | 18 |

== See also ==
- 2004 Rhythmic Gymnastics Grand Prix circuit
