= Azerbaijan Gymnastics Federation =

Sports governing body in Azerbaijan

- Sport: Gymnastics
- Abbreviation: AGF
- Founded: 1994
- Affiliation: IFG
- Location: National Gymnastics Arena, Baku, Azerbaijan
- President: Mehriban Aliyeva
- Vice president: Altay Hasanov

Official website
- agf.az/en/
- (Azerbaijan)

Azerbaijan Gymnastics Federation Public Association (Azerbaijani: "Azərbaycan Gimnastika Federasiyası" İctimai Birliyi) is the overall governing body of the sports of gymnastics in Azerbaijan. The disciplines covered by its activities include artistic gymnastics, rhythmic gymnastics, trampoline gymnastics, acrobatic gymnastics, aerobic gymnastics, TeamGym, parkour, and Gymnastics for All.

== History ==
“Azerbaijan Gymnastics Federation” Public Association was founded In 1994 after the Ministry of Justice of Azerbaijan issued State Registration Certificate of the Federation (AGF). The AGF became an Affiliated Member Federation of the International Federation of Gymnastics (FIG) in 1994. In 1996, it joined the European Union of Gymnastics (UEG). In 2002, the Federation was restructured and the founding conference of the AGF was conducted on the 7th of October. The First Lady of Azerbaijan, Mehriban Aliyeva, was elected as the President of the Federation.

The AGF was selected as the “Federation of 2009” by the Ministry of Youth and Sport of Azerbaijan in December 2009. The National Olympic Committee of Azerbaijan awarded the President of the AGF, Mehriban Aliyeva, with the nomination of "Best Sports Figure of 2014” in December 2014. In March 2015, the AGF ranked in the 3rd place by the FIG for its activities for the year of 2014. The President of AGF, Mehriban Aliyeva was awarded with the “Heydar Aliyev” prize, and the Vice-President of the AGF, Altay Hasanov, was awarded with the “Shohrat” order by the President of Azerbaijan in June 2015 for their activities during the European Games.

In December 2024, the AGF was sanctioned by the Gymnastics Ethics Foundation, as it was held liable for abuse carried out by several coaches, including the head coach of rhythmic gymnastics, Mariana Vasileva. The AGF was required to pay a fine and appoint a safeguarding expert, and it was barred from participating in FIG activities for six months.

== Administration ==
The President of AGF is Mehriban Aliyeva and the Vice-President is Altay Hasanov.

The supreme governing body of the AGF is the General Assembly. The Executive Committee supervises the Federation’s activities between the sessions of General Assembly and reports to the General Assembly, which elects the members of the Executive Committee for a 5-year period.

The Executive Committee of AGF is composed of:

- EC Chairman – the President of AGF
- EC Deputy Chairman – the Vice-President of AGF
- 3 EC Members.

=== Representation at FIG and UEG ===
Nihad Hagverdiyev, the International Relations Manager of AGF was elected a member of Disciplinary Commission of FIG at the Council Meeting of the FIG conducted in Orlando in May 2007, and at the Council Meeting held in Lillestrøm in May 2009.

Farid Gayibov, the former Secretary General of AGF, was elected as a member of the Council of FIG at the 77th Congress of FIG held in Helsinki in October 2008, and at the 79th FIG Congress in Cancun in October 2012. Mr. Gayibov was elected as the Vice-President of UEG at the 25th Congress of the organization held in Portorož in December 2013. Farid Gayibov was elected the President of UEG at the 27th UEG Congress held in Split on December 2, 2017.

Mehman Aliyev, International Relations Manager of AGF was elected a member of Disciplinary Commission of FIG at the Council Meeting of the FIG conducted in Liverpool In May 2013.

National Gymnastics Arena of Azerbaijan

== Venue ==
The National Gymnastics Arena, designed by Broadway Malyan, was constructed between August 2009 and February 2014 to host rhythmic and artistic gymnastics competitions. The Arena was inaugurated on April 16, 2014 and the 30th European Rhythmic Gymnastics Championships was the first event conducted at the NGA in June 2014.

== See also ==
- Gymnastics in Azerbaijan
- National Gymnastics Arena
