= 2009 Rhythmic Gymnastics European Championships =

- Location: Baku, Azerbaijan
- Start date: 15 May 2009
- End date: 17 May 2009

The 25th Rhythmic Gymnastics European Championships was opened on May 15, 2009, in Baku, Azerbaijan in the Heydar Aliyev Sports-Concert Complex and ended on May 17. 186 gymnasts from 32 countries were scheduled to participate.

Gazelle was chosen to be the official symbol of this tournament. The Head of the European Union of Gymnastics Dimitrios Dimitropulos said an official opening ceremony that "the championship has been organized in line with high standards".

== Medal winners ==
Event	Gold	Silver	Bronze
Senior Finals
Team	Russia; Yevgeniya Kanayeva; Olga Kapranova; Vera Sessina	Azerbaijan; Aliya Garayeva; Anna Gurbanova; Zeynab Javadli	Ukraine; Anna Bessonova; Daria Kushnerova; Alina Maksymenko
Rope	Yevgeniya Kanayeva; Russia	Vera Sessina; Russia	Anna Bessonova; Ukraine
Hoop	Yevgeniya Kanayeva; Russia	Vera Sessina; Russia	Anna Bessonova; Ukraine
Ball	Yevgeniya Kanayeva; Russia	Anna Bessonova; Ukraine	Anna Gurbanova; Azerbaijan
Ribbon	Yevgeniya Kanayeva; Russia	Vera Sessina; Russia	Anna Bessonova; Ukraine
Junior Groups Finals
5 ribbons	Russia; Elizaveta Aleksandrova; Olga Ilina; Daria Izotova; Valeria Kartasheva; Ekaterina Mokhnatkina; Olga Raspopina	Azerbaijan; Sabina Abbasova; Nigar Abdusalimova; Ayelita Khalafova; Lala Maharramova; Kamilla Mammadova; Yevgeniya Zhidkova	Belarus; Hanna Dudzenkova; Aksana Kushnir; Yana Lukavetc; Valeriya Pischelina; Anastasiya Rauskaya; Aliaksandra Yakushava

== Senior Results ==
=== Team ===
Rank	Nation	Rope (rhythmic gymnastics)	Hoop (rhythmic gymnastics)	Ball (rhythmic gymnastics)	Ribbon (rhythmic gymnastics)	Total
1st place, gold medalist(s)	Russia	56.975	56.650	55.225	55.475	224.325
2nd place, silver medalist(s)	Azerbaijan	53.450	52.900	53.825	52.675	212.850
3rd place, bronze medalist(s)	Ukraine	52.525	51.950	53.225	52.000	209.700
4	Belarus	52.025	51.925	53.225	50.725	207.900
5	Israel	51.525	51.400	52.900	50.225	206.050
6	Bulgaria	52.275	50.500	51.500	49.250	203.525
7	Poland	47.050	48.550	47.825	48.775	192.200
8	Austria	47.400	48.925	46.825	47.475	190.625
9	Italy	47.600	49.075	44.500	49.050	190.225
10	Spain	47.025	47.875	48.075	45.900	188.875
11	Greece	45.425	48.225	45.050	47.350	186.050
12	Georgia	45.050	47.300	46.900	44.150	183.400
13	Hungary	45.825	47.425	44.750	44.800	182.800
14	Turkey	45.500	47.650	43.600	44.900	181.650
15	Estonia	43.550	46.175	45.475	45.400	180.600
16	Czech Republic	46.000	44.200	43.550	45.525	179.275
17	Portugal	44.725	45.250	42.475	44.125	176.575
18	Slovenia	43.625	45.800	41.100	45.500	176.025
19	Cyprus	41.550	44.075	44.100	43.275	173.000
20	Latvia	43.475	43.150	45.075	40.450	172.150
21	Finland	44.225	41.700	43.600	41.050	170.575
22	Romania	43.350	44.375	42.175	40.400	170.300
23	Slovakia	41.300	41.975	43.250	42.200	168.725
24	Great Britain	40.450	42.675	41.400	39.975	164.500
25	Belgium	42.050	42.750	37.925	40.325	163.050
26	Lithuania	40.800	39.075	40.200	34.050	154.125
27	Norway	38.250	37.825	37.675	38.125	151.875
28	Moldova	36.800	37.850	36.500	35.900	147.050

=== Rope ===
Rank	Gymnast	Nation	D Score	A Score	E Score	Pen.	Total
1st place, gold medalist(s)	Yevgeniya Kanayeva	Russia	9.600	9.650	9.600		28.850
2nd place, silver medalist(s)	Vera Sessina	Russia	9.200	9.500	9.500	0.05	28.150
3rd place, bronze medalist(s)	Anna Bessonova	Ukraine	8.825	9.500	9.300		27.625
4	Anna Gurbanova	Azerbaijan	8.800	9.200	9.200		27.200
5	Liubov Charkashyna	Belarus	8.400	9.300	9.100		26.800
6	Silvia Miteva	Bulgaria	8.350	9.300	9.000		26.650
7	Irina Risenson	Israel	8.325	9.200	9.000		26.525
8	Aliya Garayeva	Azerbaijan	8.150	9.100	9.000	0.10	26.100

=== Hoop ===
Rank	Gymnast	Nation	D Score	A Score	E Score	Pen.	Total
1st place, gold medalist(s)	Yevgeniya Kanayeva	Russia	9.475	9.800	9.600		28.875
2nd place, silver medalist(s)	Vera Sessina	Russia	9.100	9.450	9.400		27.950
3rd place, bronze medalist(s)	Anna Bessonova	Ukraine	9.050	9.450	9.150		27.650
4	Aliya Garayeva	Azerbaijan	8.850	9.450	9.150		27.450
5	Anna Gurbanova	Azerbaijan	8.925	9.250	9.150	0.10	27.225
6	Irina Risenson	Israel	8.725	9.150	9.100		26.975
7	Silvia Miteva	Bulgaria	8.700	9.150	8.800		26.650
8	Svetlana Rudalova	Belarus	8.525	8.850	8.800		26.175

=== Ball ===
Rank	Gymnast	Nation	D Score	A Score	E Score	Pen.	Total
1st place, gold medalist(s)	Yevgeniya Kanayeva	Russia	9.750	9.700	9.600		29.050
2nd place, silver medalist(s)	Anna Bessonova	Ukraine	9.050	9.550	9.400		28.000
3rd place, bronze medalist(s)	Anna Gurbanova	Azerbaijan	9.300	9.300	9.250		27.850
4	Olga Kapranova	Russia	9.050	9.300	9.300	0.05	27.600
5	Aliya Garayeva	Azerbaijan	9.100	9.200	9.250		27.550
6	Melitina Staniouta	Belarus	9.000	9.050	9.150		27.200
7	Irina Risenson	Israel	8.600	9.200	9.100	0.10	26.800
8	Liubov Charkashyna	Belarus	8.525	8.900	8.800		26.225

=== Ribbon ===
Rank	Gymnast	Nation	D Score	A Score	E Score	Pen.	Total
1st place, gold medalist(s)	Yevgeniya Kanayeva	Russia	9.225	9.750	9.450		28.425
2nd place, silver medalist(s)	Vera Sessina	Russia	9.200	9.500	9.400	0.05	28.050
3rd place, bronze medalist(s)	Anna Bessonova	Ukraine	9.125	9.350	9.100		27.575
4	Aliya Garayeva	Azerbaijan	8.850	9.400	9.250		27.500
5	Anna Gurbanova	Azerbaijan	8.650	9.300	9.300		27.250
6	Silvia Miteva	Bulgaria	8.850	9.250	9.100		27.100
7	Irina Risenson	Israel	8.675	9.250	9.000		26.925
8	Melitina Staniouta	Belarus	8.575	9.100	9.150		26.825

== Junior Results ==
=== Group 5 ribbons ===
Rank	Nation	D Score	A Score	E Score	Pen.	Total
1st place, gold medalist(s)	Russia	8.000	9.500	9.000		26.500
2nd place, silver medalist(s)	Azerbaijan	7.800	9.100	8.750		25.650
3rd place, bronze medalist(s)	Belarus	7.350	8.850	8.100		24.300
4	Israel	6.975	8.750	8.150		23.875
5	Spain	7.300	8.650	7.900		23.850
6	Bulgaria	7.150	8.750	7.800	0.20	23.500
7	Hungary	6.650	8.250	7.650		22.550
8	Poland	6.375	8.300	7.300	0.05	21.925
