= National Gymnastics Arena =

Sporting venue

- Interactive map of National Gymnastics Arena
- Location: Baku, Azerbaijan
- Coordinates: 40.41923°N 49.916605°E
- Owner: Mayoralty of Baku
- Capacity: 5,000–10,000
- Public transit: Koroğlu

Construction
- Groundbreaking: August 2009
- Built: 2009–2014
- Opened: April 2014
- Architects: Broadway Malyan, sport specialist BDP Pattern
- Project manager: Phil Benson
- Main contractors: PASHA Construction (PASHA Holding), sport specialist BDP Pattern

Website
- www.mga.az

The National Gymnastics Arena is an indoor arena in Baku, Azerbaijan. The venue is mainly used for gymnastics but also host national or international events for other sports.

== Overview ==
National Gymnastics Arena in Baku, Azerbaijan was designed by Broadway Malyan and sport specialist BDP Pattern. PASHA Construction (PASHA Holding) appointed Broadway Malyan and sport specialist BDP Pattern to develop the arena from start to finish after winning a competition to design the scheme in 2011. The construction of the NGA started in August 2009, and was inaugurated in April 2014. The arena has capacity of 5,000–9,000 seats depending on the event conducting.

=== Airdome ===
The NGA has an additional training hall - Airdome, which was constructed in the south part of the arena on an area of 6000 m^{2}. The dome is kept inflated by ventilators creating internal pressure.

== Events ==
The arena hosted several events of different types of sports as following:

Event	Date
21st Rhythmic Gymnastics Azerbaijan Championship	April 2014
30th Rhythmic Gymnastics European Championships	June 2014
1st WTF World Cadet Taekwondo Championships	July 2014
Joint Gymnastics Tournament in 5 disciplines	August 2014
21st Azerbaijan and Baku Championships on men's artistic gymnastics	December 2014
Azerbaijan's and Baku Championship on rhythmic gymnastics, also the first ever Regions' Cup	December 2014
2015 NN Table Tennis ITTF - Europe Top 16 Cup	February 2015
Open Joint Azerbaijan Championships in Gymnastics Disciplines	March 2015
1st European Games	June 2015
FIG Artistic Gymnastics World Challenge Cup AGF Trophy	February 2016
FIG World Cup in Trampoline Gymnastics	March 2016
Azerbaijan and Baku Championship among age categories in Artistic Gymnastics	May 2016
FIG World Cup Final in Rhythmic Gymnastics	July 2016
23rd Baku Championship in Acrobatic Gymnastics	November 2016
14th Azerbaijan and Baku Championship among Age Categories in Trampoline Gymnastics and Tumbling	November 2016
FIG World Cup in Trampoline Gymnastics and Tumbling	February 2017
FIG Artistic Gymnastics Individual Apparatus World Cup	March 2017
FIG Rhythmic Gymnastics World Cup Series	April 2017
4th Islamic Solidarity Games	May 2017
24th Baku Championship and Azerbaijan Championship among Age Categories in Men's and Women's Artistic Gymnastics	June 2017
24th Azerbaijan Championship among Age Categories in Acrobatic Gymnastics	June 2017
Azerbaijan and Baku Trampoline Gymnastics and Tumbling Championships among Age Categories	November 2017
Open Azerbaijan and Baku Aerobic Gymnastics Championships among Age Categories	November 2017
Rhythmic Gymnastics Baku Championships among Age Categories	November 2017
2018 World Judo Championships	September 2018
2019 Rhythmic Gymnastics European Championships	May 2019
26th Azerbaijan and Baku Championships among age categories	June 2019
2019 European Youth Summer Olympic Festival (Artistic gymnastics)	July 2019
FIG Rhythmic Gymnastics World Championships	September 2019
2021 Trampoline Gymnastics World Championships	November 2021
2022 Acrobatic Gymnastics World Championships	March 2022
2025 WMF World Cup final	June 2025
UFC Fight Night: Fiziev vs. Torres	27 June 2026

== See also ==
- Azerbaijan Gymnastics Federation
- Gymnastics in Azerbaijan
