= Iordanka Andonova =

Bulgarian rhythmic gymnast

- Born: 2 February 1988 (age 38) Pazardzhik, Bulgaria

Gymnastics career
- Discipline: Rhythmic gymnastics
- Country represented: Bulgaria (2002-2005)
- Club: Levski
- Head coach: Iliana Raeva
- Assistant coach: Ina Ananieva
- Choreographer: Tsvetanka Petkova
- Retired: yes
Medal record
Women's rhythmic gymnastics
Representing Bulgaria
Gold medal – first place	2005 Baku	5 Ribbons

Iordanka Andonova (born 2 February 1988) is a former Bulgarian rhythmic gymnast. She's the 2005 world champion with 5 ribbons.

== Career ==
Born in Pazardzhik, Iordanka started practicing rhythmic gymnastics at the Dilyana Club with first coach Ditka Stoilova. In 2000 she moved to the Levski club, where she trained under Neshka Robeva, Elizabeth Koleva, Lushka Bachvarova and Kamelia Dunavska.

She entered the national team in 2002 competing as an individual. In 2005 she was incorporated into the national senior group, at the World Championships in Baku the group, made of Iordanka, Eleonora Kezhova, Zornitsa Marinova, Kristina Ranguelova, Joanna Tancheva and Tatiana Tongova, was 4th in the All-Around and with 3 clubs & 2 hoops and won gold with 5 ribbons.

In 2013 Andonova established a rhythmic gymnastics club in Sofia called "Victoria". In 2019, the club organized its first international tournament "Viktoria Cup", which was attended by over 500 competitors from seven countries.
