= Tuğçe Oylumlu =

Turkish rhythmic gymnast

- Born: 7 April 1988 (age 38)

Gymnastics career
- Discipline: Rhythmic gymnastics
- Country represented: Turkey; (2005)

Tuğçe Oylumlu (born 7 April 1988) is a Turkish individual rhythmic gymnast. She represents her nation at international competitions. She competed at world championships, including at the 2005 World Rhythmic Gymnastics Championships.

She is the twin sister of Gizem Oylumlu, who is also a Turkish international gymnast.
