= Fanny Perret =

Swiss group rhythmic gymnast

- Born: 13 January 1988 (age 38)

Gymnastics career
- Discipline: Rhythmic gymnastics
- Country represented: Switzerland (2005)
- Last updated on: 7 June 2016.

Fanny Perret (born 13 January 1988) is a Swiss group rhythmic gymnast. She represents Switzerland in international competitions. She competed at World championships, including at the 2005 World Rhythmic Gymnastics Championships.
