= Caïn (TV series) =

French TV series

- Genre: Crime
- Created by: Alexis Le Sec; Bertrand Arthuys
- Original language: French
- No. of seasons: 8
- No. of episodes: 68

Production
- Camera setup: Multi-camera

Original release
- Network: France 2
- Release: October 5, 2012 – present

Caïn is a French crime-television-series. In the U.S., the series is available on Walter Presents.

== Content ==
Frédéric Caïn is a police officer with the rank of captain, who sits in a wheelchair since a self-inflicted motorcycle accident. He is a cynical man with a dark sense of humour, who likes to be on the verge of legality in his investigations and who attracts many people with his style. He is assisted by Lieutenant Lucie Delambre. Caïn's private life revolves around his ex-wife Gaëlle and his son Ben.

== Cast ==
- Bruno Debrandt (Season 1-7)/Julien Baumgartner (Season 7-): Frederick Caïn
- Julie Delarme: Lucie Delambre
- Frédéric Pellegeay: Jacques Moretti
- Anne Suarez: Gaëlle
- Smadi Wolfman: Dr. Elizabeth Stunia
- Davy Sanna: Ben
- Jean-Yves Berteloot: Valentin Zuycker (5 Episodes)

=== Guest ===
- Sara Martins: Barbara Simon (Season 1, Episode 2)
- Natacha Lindinger: Anna Spiegelman (Season 1, Episode 3)
- Pablo Pauly: Jordan (Season 1, Episode 7)
- Marie Kremer: Ornella (Season 2, Episode 2)
- Christine Citti: Jeanne Lestral (Season 2, Episode 5)
- Philippe Nahon: Stefano (Season 2, Episode 6)
- Francis Perrin: Barthes (Season 2, Episode 7)
- Bruno Wolkowitch: Mathias Very (Season 4, Episode 1)
- Mylène Demongeot: Jacqueline Benedetti (Season 5, Episode 2)
- Cristiana Reali: Florence Murat (Season 5, Episode 3)
- Andréa Ferréol: Agnès Vautrin (Season 7, Episode 1 & 2)
- Guilaine Londez: Anita (Season 7, Episode 7)
