= Aliya Garayeva =

Azerbaijani rhythmic gymnast (born 1988)

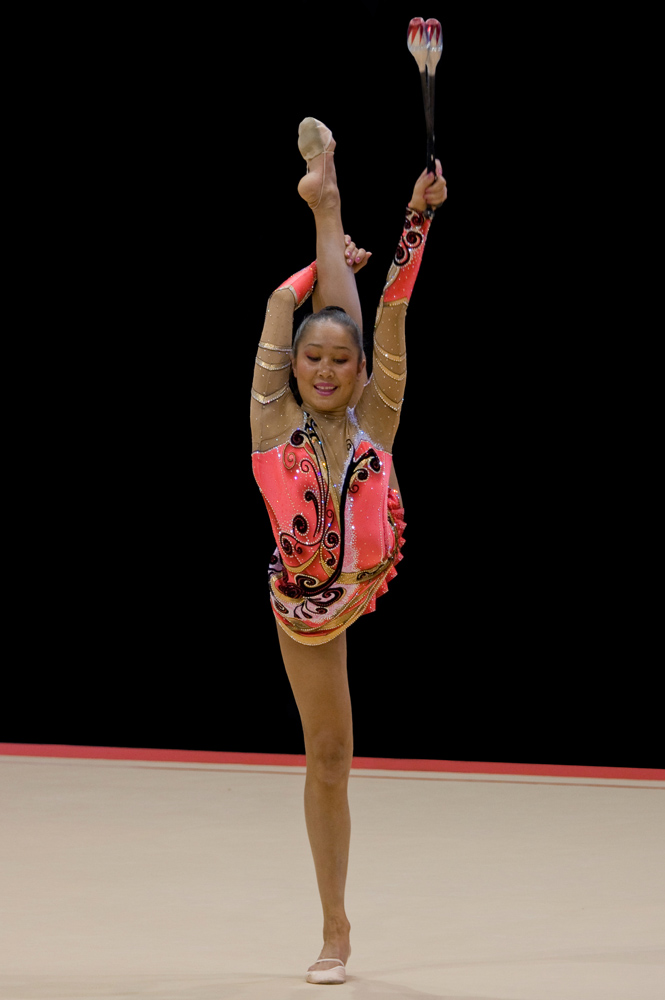

Personal information
- Born: 1 January 1988 (age 38) Sverdlovsk (now Yekaterinburg), Russia SFSR, Soviet Union

Gymnastics career
- Discipline: Rhythmic gymnastics
- Country represented: Azerbaijan (2006-2012)
- Former countries represented: Russia
- Club: Neftchi
- Head coach: Mariana Vasileva
- Assistant coach: Dinara Gimatova
- Choreographer: Veronica Shatkova
- Retired: 2012
Medal record
Rhythmic Gymnastics
Representing Azerbaijan
World Championships
Silver medal – second place	2009 Mie	Ball
Bronze medal – third place	2007 Patras	Team
Bronze medal – third place	2009 Mie	Team
Bronze medal – third place	2010 Moscow	Hoop
Bronze medal – third place	2010 Moscow	Ball
Bronze medal – third place	2010 Moscow	Ribbon
Bronze medal – third place	2010 Moscow	Team
Bronze medal – third place	2011 Montpellier	All-around
European Championships
Gold medal – first place	2007 Baku	Rope
Silver medal – second place	2009 Baku	Team
Bronze medal – third place	2007 Baku	Team
Bronze medal – third place	2010 Bremen	All-around
Bronze medal – third place	2012 Nizhny Novgorod	All-around
World Cup Final
Bronze medal – third place	2008 Benidorm	Rope
Grand Prix Final
Silver medal – second place	2010 Berlin	Ball
Bronze medal – third place	2007 Innsbruck	All-around
Bronze medal – third place	2007 Innsbruck	Clubs
Bronze medal – third place	2011 Brno	All-around
Bronze medal – third place	2011 Brno	Hoop
Bronze medal – third place	2011 Brno	Ribbon
Bronze medal – third place	2011 Brno	Clubs
Bronze medal – third place	2011 Brno	Ball
World Games
Bronze medal – third place	2009 Kaohsiung	Ribbon
Summer Universiade
Silver medal – second place	2011 Shenzhen	Clubs

Aliya Nurgayanovna (Nikolayevna) Garaeva (Garayeva) (Tatar: Алия Нургаян кызы Гәрәева; Aliya Nurgayan qızı Gäräeva; Russian: Алия Нургаяновна Гараева), born 1 January 1988 in Yekaterinburg, Russian SFSR, Soviet Union) is a retired Azerbaijani individual rhythmic gymnast. She represented Russia (until 2005), and Azerbaijan (2006–2012).

She is the 2011 World All-around bronze medalist, a two-time (2010, 2012) European All-around bronze medalist, two time (2007, 2011) Grand Prix Final All-around bronze medalist and five-time Azerbaijanii National champion. She was one of few gymnasts not representing Russia to ever been trained by Irina Viner, famous head coach of Russia's national team. She is the most successful Azerbaijani rhythmic gymnast of all time.

== Career ==
Garayeva became a two-time Azerbaijan champion in 2006 for her individual performances. She won bronze at the 2007 Grand Prix in Moscow in the all-around competition and two individual performances. Garayeva placed 6th in the all-around competition at the European Championships held in Moscow in 2006. She placed first in the ribbon and became the all-around bronze medalist. Garayeva finished third at international tournaments held in Russia, Greece and Italy.

In 2006, Garayeva finished 4th at a club world championship held in Japan. In February 2007, her team won a stage of the Italian club championship. Competing in her first Olympics at the 2008 Summer Olympics in Beijing, China, Garayeva finished 6th in the event all-around finals.

Garayeva won bronze at the 2010 World Championships in the individual apparatus finals in ball, ribbon and hoop. She also won the all-around bronze medal at the 2010 European Championships. The following year, Garayeva won the all-around bronze medal at the 2011 World Championships in Montpellier, France. She then competed at the Grand Prix Final and won bronze in all-around, as well as bronze in hoop, ball, clubs and ribbon finals.

Garayeva started the 2012 season by winning bronze medal in the all-around at the Penza World Cup and the silver medal at the World Cup in Tashkent. She then won her second European all-around bronze medal at 2012 European Championships. At the 2012 Summer Olympics in London, Garayeva was 3rd in the qualifications. She finished 4th in the All-around finals with Belarus' Liubov Charkashyna taking the bronze medal. She completed her competitive career at the end of the 2012 Season.

Following the 2012 Olympics, Garayeva announced retiring from gymnastics. Garayeva married in 2012 and in 2014 began a career as a coach in rhythmic gymnastics.

== Personal life ==
Garayeva was born in a Tatar family. Her mother, Vasilina Akhatovna Garaeva, is a rhythmic gymnastic coach. She is married to Azerbaijani Javid Hajiyev, and on 7 August 2015 she gave birth to their first child, a son named Timur. The couple welcomed their second child, a son named Emil, on the 13th of October 2018.

Since 2015, she lives with her family in Frankfurt, Germany. In March 2021, she started working as a full-time rhythmic gymnastics coach at club Eintracht Frankfurt.

== Detailed Olympic results ==
Year	Competition Description	Location	Music	Apparatus	Score-Final	Score-Qualifying
2012	Olympics	London		All-around	111.575	111.850
2012	Olympics	London	Volare by Dean Martin, Bang Bang by Tito Nieves, Quien Como Tu by JJ Vianello	Hoop	27.925	27.450
2012	Olympics	London	You Can Leave Your Hat On by Joe Cocker	Ball	27.825	28.350
2012	Olympics	London	Nazende sevgilim by Bilen Yildirir	Clubs	27.575	27.850
2012	Olympics	London	Move, 19 Palqü (Original Mix) by Said Mrad, Backside Artists Vs. Antoine Montana	Ribbon	28.250	28.200

Year	Competition Description	Location	Music	Apparatus	Score-Final	Score-Qualifying
2008	Olympics	Beijing		All-around	69.675	69.200
2008	Olympics	Beijing	Danse de Phryné (Walpurgis Night) from Faust by Charles Gounod	Rope	17.750	17.875
2008	Olympics	Beijing	Monologue: Nurida, Schahriar's Variation, Orgy, Duet: Schahriar And Scheherazade, Mardshana's Dance by Fikret Amirov	Hoop	18.075	16.850
2008	Olympics	Beijing	Snakefood / Samb Adagio by Safri duo	Clubs	17.225	17.625
2008	Olympics	Beijing	Tango and Resurgence by Sultan Ali	Ribbon	16.625	16.850

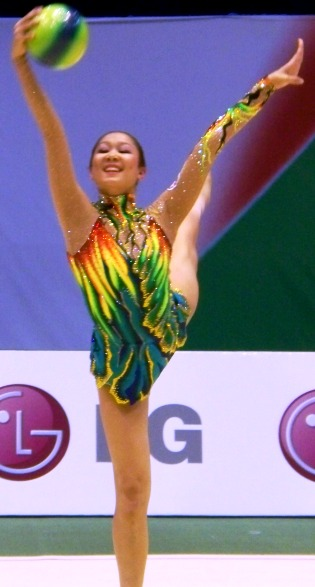
Aliya Garayeva with ball

== See also ==
- Nationality changes in gymnastics
