= Mariko Takahashi (gymnast) =

Japanese rhythmic gymnast

Mariko Takahashi (高橋 麻理子, Takahashi Mariko; born July 13, 1988) is a gymnast from Japan. She participated in the 2005 World Rhythmic Gymnastics Championships.
