= Valeria Kurylskaya =

Belarusian rhythmic gymnast (born 1988)

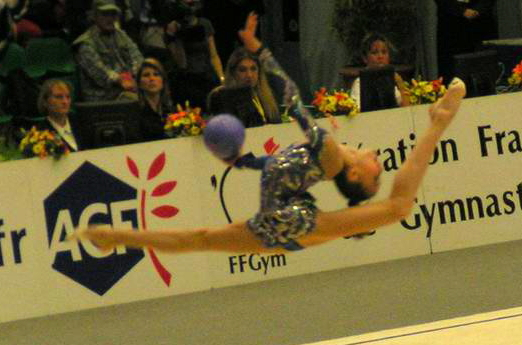
- Valeria Kurylskaya performing with the ball at a competition in 2004

Personal information
- Born: February 26, 1988 (age 38) Minsk, Belarus

Gymnastics career
- Discipline: Rhythmic gymnastics
- Country represented: Belarus
Medal record
Representing Belarus
World Championships
Bronze medal – third place	2003 Budapest	Team
Bronze medal – third place	2005 Baku	Team
European Championships
Bronze medal – third place	2004 Kyiv	Team
Bronze medal – third place	2005 Moscow	Team

Valeria Kurylskaya (born February 26, 1988) is a rhythmic gymnast who represented Belarus at both the 2003 and 2005 World Rhythmic Gymnastics Championships.

== Competitive highlights ==
Year	Event	Team	AA	Hoop	Ball	Clubs	Ribb.
International
2001	Aeon Cup	3rd	2nd J				
2002	Aeon Cup	3rd	2nd J				
