= Aleksandra Szutenberg =

Polish rhythmic gymnast (born 1988)

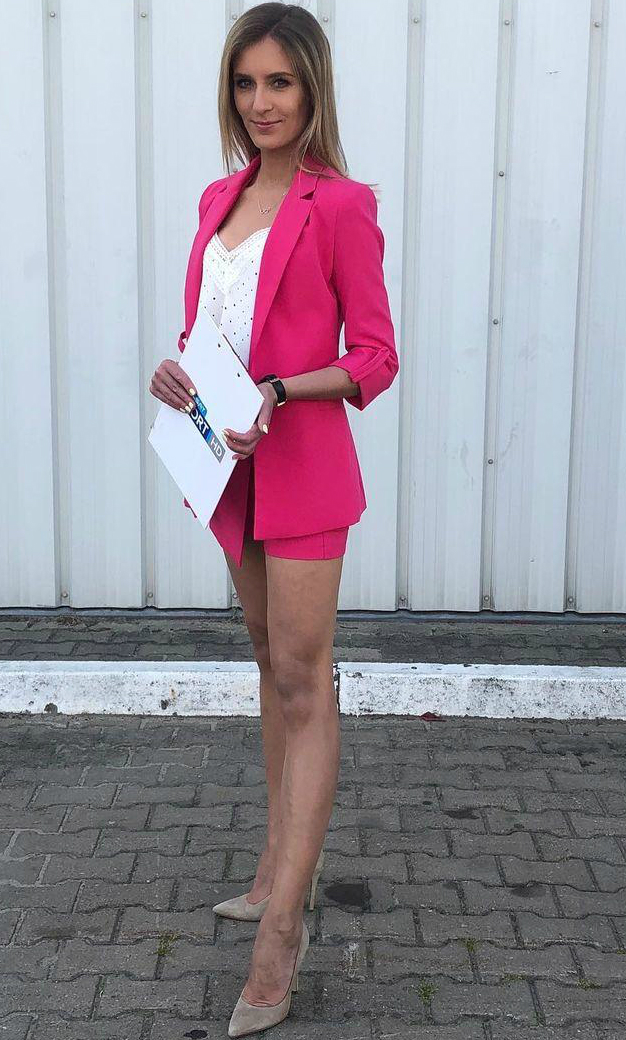

Personal information
- Born: 15 October 1988 (age 38)

Gymnastics career
- Discipline: Rhythmic gymnastics
- Country represented: Poland

Aleksandra Szutenberg (born 15 October 1988) is a Polish rhythmic gymnast. She started gymnast training at the age of 6.

Results

- 2002 – Polish Nationals (2)
- 2002 – Polish Nationals in Team (1)
