= Nathalie Fauquette =

French rhythmic gymnast and dancer (born 1987)

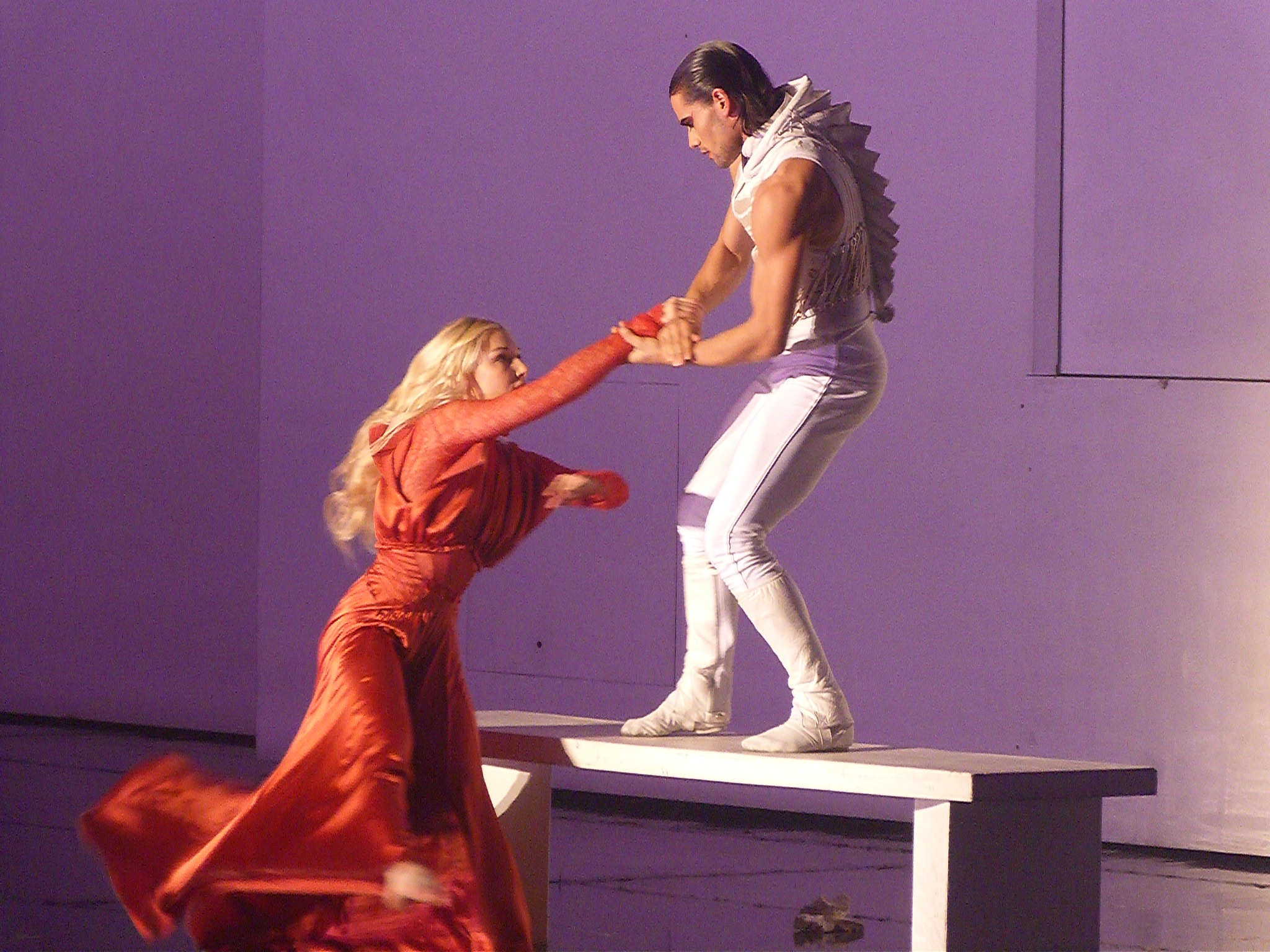
- Born: 23 March 1987 (age 39)

Gymnastics career
- Discipline: Rhythmic gymnastics
- Country represented: France

Nathalie Fauquette (born 23 March 1987) is a former French rhythmic gymnast, now a dancer. She started rhythmic gymnastics at the age of 7 and later trained under Katia Guillère.

After training for the 2008 Summer Olympics, she started a new career. In 2008, she appeared in the French musical Cléopâtre, la dernière reine d'Égypte (as a gymnast and dancer) and in 2010 she was cast as Mina in Dracula, l'amour plus fort que la mort (the part includes dancing and acting).
