= Dominika Červenková =

Czech rhythmic gymnast (born 1988)

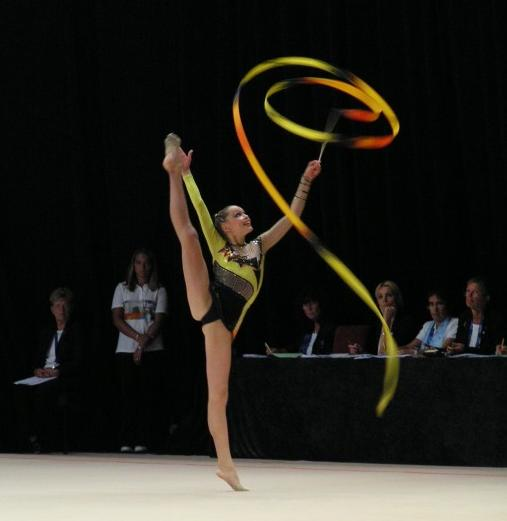
- Dominika Červenková performing her ribbon routine during the 2005 World Games in Duisburg

Personal information
- Born: 18 May 1988 (age 38)

Gymnastics career
- Discipline: Rhythmic gymnastics
- Country represented: Czech Republic

Dominika Červenková (born 18 May 1988) is a rhythmic gymnast from the Czech Republic, who participated in the 2004 Athens Olympic Games.

== Biography ==
Červenková was born 18 May 1988 in České Budějovice. She started gymnastics at the age of four. From an early age, she made a great impression on the Czech rhythmic gymnastics, which had not qualified any athletes for the 2000 Olympics.

Under the guidance of coach Ivana Pokorná, she joined the senior national team in 2003. She finished second all-around in the national championships, behind Kateřina Kopáčová, and won her first senior title with ball. She, however, beat the Czech number one in the Budapest World Championships that served as the qualification event for the 2004 Olympics. Červenková finished 18th in the qualification round and slipped down to 25th in the final all-around, but it was enough to secure the Czech Republic one Olympic spot.

In 2004, Červenková won her first all-around national title and confirmed herself as the third gymnast to represent the Czech Republic (first one since Lenka Oulehlová and Andrea Šebestová finished 22nd and 28th respectively in the 1996 Summer Olympics in Atlanta). At age 16, Červenková was the youngest member of the Czech Olympic team for Athens, as well as the tiniest one (only 1.60m tall). Struggling with her last hoop routine she finished 20th in the all-around qualification, but was warmly applauded by the audience.

In Baku, Červenková competed in the world championships in 2005, 16th all-around final. She also took participation in the 2005 World Games in Duisburg, the individual apparatus substitute event to the Olympic Games recording the best result of ninth place with ribbon, only 0.05 pts out of final.

In 2006, Červenková withdrew from a large part of the season due to an injury. She missed the major part of the season, including the Europeans. In January 2007, the Czech Rhythmic Gymnastics Union board decided to discard Červenková from the national team following sport-medicine consultants.

== Achievements ==
- 2003 World Championships: 16th team, 25th A-A
- 2004 European Championships: 18th A-A
- 2004 Olympic Games: 20th A-A
- 2005 European Championships: 11th team, 15th A-A
- 2005 World Championships: 16th A-A, 14th rope, 17th ribbon, 19th ball, 21st clubs
- 2005 World Games: 9th ribbon, 12th ball and rope, 14th clubs

== Competitive highlights ==
| Year | Event | Team | AA | Hoop | Ball | Clubs | Ribb. |
International
| 2002 | Aeon Cup | | 3rd J | | | | |
