= Svetlana Rudalova =

Belarusian rhythmic gymnast

- Full name: Svetlana Viktorovna Rudalova (Светлана Викторовна Рудалова)
- Born: 3 November 1984 (age 42) Kremenchuk

Gymnastics career
- Discipline: Rhythmic gymnastics
- Country represented: Belarus
Medal record
Representing Belarus
World Championships
Silver medal – second place	2007 Patras	Team
Silver medal – second place	2009 Mie	Team
Bronze medal – third place	2003 Budapest	Team
Bronze medal – third place	2005 Baku	Team
European Championships
Bronze medal – third place	2004 Kyiv	Team
Bronze medal – third place	2005 Moscow	Team

Svetlana Rudalova (Belarusian: Светлана Рудалова, born 3 November 1984 in Kremenchuk) is a Belarusian individual rhythmic gymnast.

Rudalova made her international debut in 2002, and appeared at the 2004 Olympic Games, where she placed 10th in the all-around contest.

== See also ==
- Nationality changes in gymnastics
