= Anna Gurbanova =

Azerbaijani rhythmic gymnast (born 1986)

- Anna Qurbanova
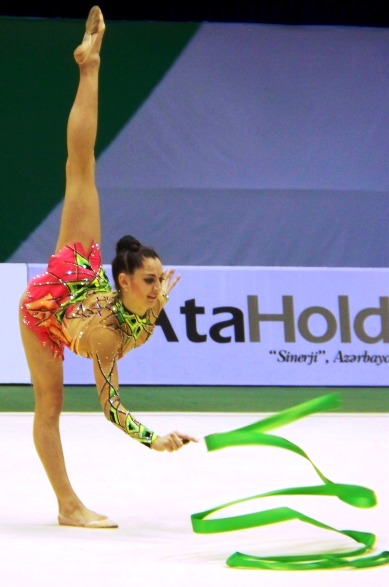
- Anna Gurbanova in 2009

Personal information
- Born: 24 September 1986 (age 40) Moscow, Russia

Gymnastics career
- Discipline: Rhythmic gymnastics
- Country represented: Azerbaijan
Medal record
Representing Azerbaijan
World Championships
Bronze medal – third place	2007 Patras	Team
Bronze medal – third place	2009 Mie	Team
Bronze medal – third place	2010 Moscow	Team
European Championships
Silver medal – second place	2009 Baku	Team
Bronze medal – third place	2009 Baku	Ball
Bronze medal – third place	2007 Baku	Team

Anna Gurbanova (Azerbaijani: Anna Qurbanova; born 24 September 1986) is a Russian-born Azerbaijani rhythmic gymnast who earned bronze medals in the team event at the 2007, 2009 and 2010 World Rhythmic Gymnastics Championships. Gurbanova also earned a silver and a bronze medal at the 2009 Rhythmic Gymnastics European Championships. She also represented Azerbaijan at the 2004 Summer Olympics in Athens.

== Early life ==
Anna Gurbanova was born on 24 September 1986 in Moscow.

== Career ==
Gurbanova made her Olympics at the 2004 Summer Olympics in Athens, where she competed in the women's rhythmic individual all-around event and placed fourteenth. She also finished in fifteenth place at the 2004 European Rhythmic Gymnastics Championships.

At the 2005 World Rhythmic Gymnastics Championships in Baku, Gurbanova finished in sixth place in the individual ball event with 15.675 points. She also earned a bronze medal in rope at the 2005 Rhythmic Gymnastics World Cup in Tashkent, and seventh in the ball, clubs, ribbon and all round events. In November 2005, she won a gold medal at the Spoleto Cup, which she dedicated to Mehriban Aliyeva due to her success in the Azerbaijani parliamentary election. She also won four silver medals during the cup tournament.

Gurbanova won a bronze medal as part of the team competition at the 2007 Rhythmic Gymnastics European Championships in Baku. She won another bronze medal in the same event during the 2007 World Rhythmic Gymnastics Championships in Patras.

During the 2009 Rhythmic Gymnastics European Championships, she won a silver medal in the team and a bronze medal in the ball events. Later in the year, she earned a bronze medal in the team event during the World Rhythmic Gymnastics Championships in Mie.

In 2010, Gurbanova won a bronze medal in the ball event at the 2010 FIG Rhythmic Gymnastics World Cup series in Corbeil-Essonnes. During the 2010 World Rhythmic Gymnastics Championships in Moscow, Gurbanova and the Azerbaijani team successfully defended their bronze medal, with a total of 266.625 points.
