= Inna Zhukova =

Belarusian rhythmic gymnast

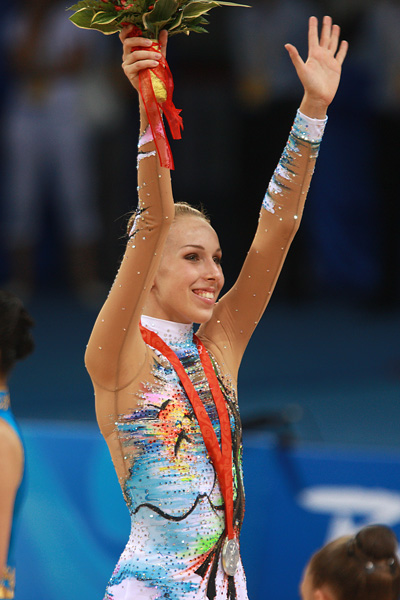
- Inna Zhukova winning silver at the 2008 Beijing Olympics

Personal information
- Full name: Inna Ivanovna Zhukova
- Born: September 6, 1986 (age 40) Krasnodar, Soviet Union
- Height: 170 cm (5 ft 7 in)

Gymnastics career
- Discipline: Rhythmic gymnastics
- Country represented: Belarus
- Head coach: Irina Leparskaya
- Assistant coach: Natalia Shmakova
- Choreographer: Halina Ryzhankova
- Eponymous skills: Zhukova: Turning "Cossack" jump with straight leg to the side high up, foot higher than head with help of the opposite hand
Medal record
Rhythmic gymnastics
Representing Belarus
Olympic Games
Silver medal – second place	2008 Beijing	All-around
World Championships
Silver medal – second place	2001 Madrid	Team
Silver medal – second place	2007 Patras	Team
Bronze medal – third place	2003 Budapest	Ball
Bronze medal – third place	2003 Budapest	Team
Bronze medal – third place	2005 Baku	Ball
Bronze medal – third place	2005 Baku	Team
Bronze medal – third place	2007 Patras	Rope
European Championships
Silver medal – second place	2003 Riesa	Ribbon
Bronze medal – third place	2003 Riesa	Ball
Bronze medal – third place	2004 Kyiv	Team
Bronze medal – third place	2005 Moscow	Ball
Bronze medal – third place	2005 Moscow	Ribbon
Bronze medal – third place	2005 Moscow	Team
European Team Championships
Bronze medal – third place	2003 Moscow	Team
World Cup Final
Silver medal – second place	2006 Mie	Ball
Bronze medal – third place	2004 Moscow	Ball
Grand Prix Final
Silver medal – second place	2004 Deventer	Ball
Silver medal – second place	2006 Berlin	Rope
Silver medal – second place	2006 Berlin	Clubs
Silver medal – second place	2006 Berlin	Ribbon
Bronze medal – third place	2002 Innsbruck	Rope
Bronze medal – third place	2003 Innsbruck	Ball
Bronze medal – third place	2004 Deventer	Clubs
Bronze medal – third place	2005 Berlin	Clubs
Bronze medal – third place	2005 Berlin	Ball
Bronze medal – third place	2006 Berlin	All-around
Summer Universiade
Bronze medal – third place	2005 Izmir	Rope
Bronze medal – third place	2007 Bangkok	Hoop

Inna Zhukova (Belarusian: Іна Іванаўна Жукава; Russian: Инна Ивановна Жукова: Inna Ivanovna Zhukova, born on September 6, 1986, in Krasnodar, Soviet Union) is a Belarusian individual rhythmic gymnast. She is the 2008 Olympics individual all-around silver medalist and 2006 Grand Prix Final all-around bronze medalist.

== Competitive career ==
Early Career

Zhukova started rhythmic gymnastics in 1990 at age 4. She began gymnastics because her older sister was a gymnast and she became interested as well. Originally, she trained in Russia, but she was invited to train in Belarus with coach Irina Leparskaya, who has trained many prominent gymnasts.

Zhukova made her international debut in 2001.

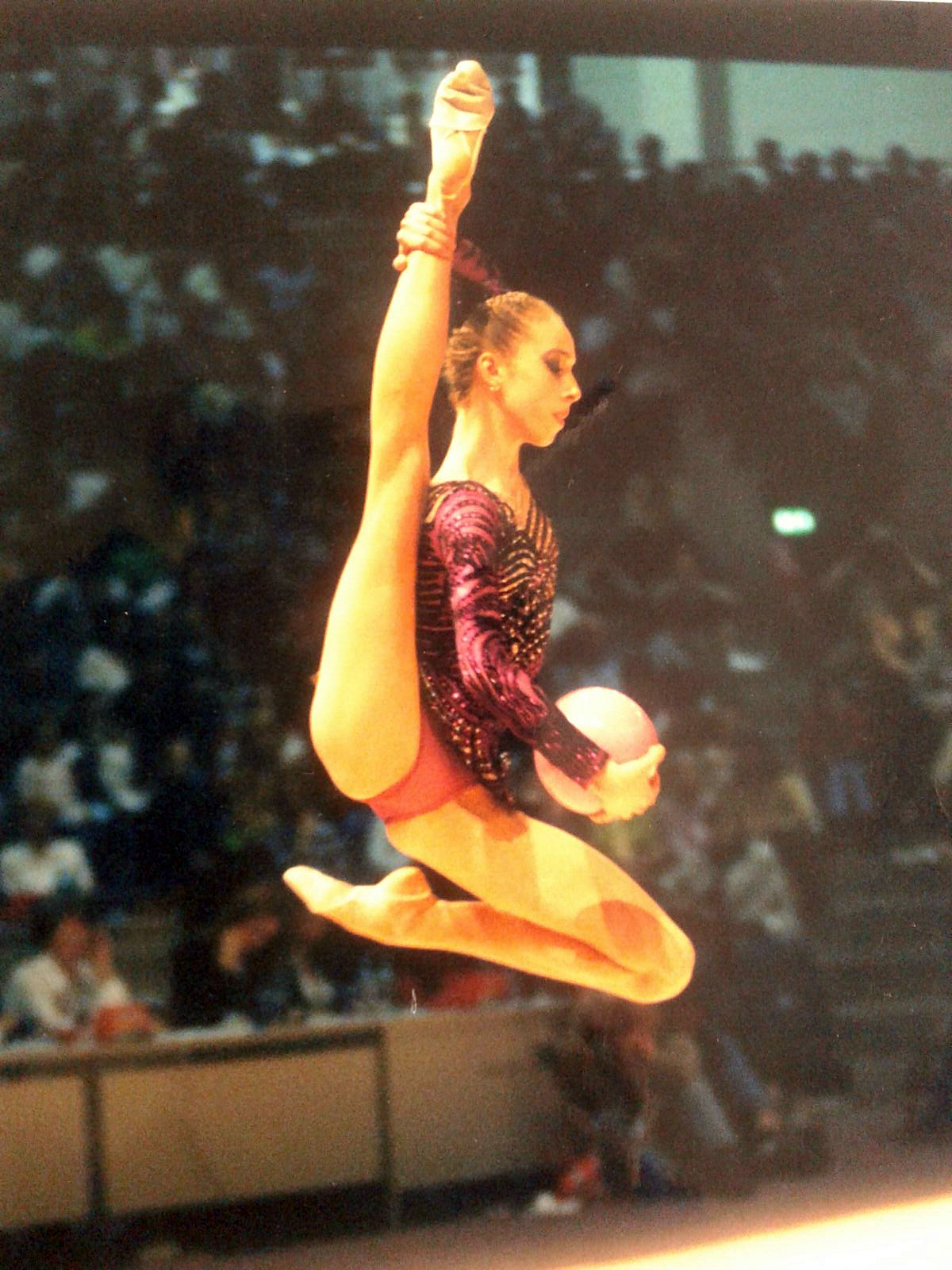
Zhukova at the 2003 European Championships, performing her eponymous jump

Athens Olympics

At the 2004 Athens Olympics, she came 7th in the All-Around competition with a total score of 100.575 (Hoop 25.00, Ball 25.300, Clubs 25.200, Ribbon 25.075).

Post-Athens

At the 2007 World Championships in Patras, Greece, Zhukova placed 4th in the all-around and won the bronze medal in the rope finals. Belarus finished second in the team competition, so Zhukova and her teammates were awarded team silver.

Beijing Olympics

At the 2008 Beijing Olympics, Zhukova placed fourth in qualifications with a score of 70.950. She advanced to the finals and won the all-around silver medal with a score of 71.925.

Post-Beijing: Retirement

After the Beijing 2008 Olympics, she decided to finish her active competitive career. However, she continued to give occasional gala exhibitions (e.g. at LA Lights in Feb, 2009).

== Post-gymnastics career ==
Zhukova began working as a coach after her retirement. In 2014, she was coaching the Belarusian junior team with her former teammate Liubov Charkashyna.

In 2020, she signed an open letter from Belarusian athletes supporting the government during the 2020–2021 Belarusian protests.

== Eponymous skill ==
Zhukova has one eponymous skill listed in the code of points, a turning jump.

Name	Description	Difficulty (Note: Valid for the 2022-2024 Code of Points)
Zhukova	Turning "Cossack" jump with straight leg to the side high up, foot higher than head, with help of the opposite hand.	0.4

== Routine music information ==
Year	Apparatus	Music title
2008	Hoop	Porto by Dulce Pontes
2008	Rope	Tanguera by Sexteto Mayor
2008	Clubs (second)	Valenki music from Terem by The Terem Quartet
2008	Clubs (first)	Kolibre by Maksim
2008	Ribbon	Fragrant branch of white acacia (Russian Romance)
2007	Hoop	Son uvidenny vo sne by Igor Krutoy
2007	Rope	Tanguera by Sexteto Mayor
2007	Clubs	Tension music from Le Rêve by Benoît Jutras
2007	Ribbon	Tango in Ebony music from Electrik by Maksim Mrvica
2006	Ball	Ya skuchayu po tebq, dazhe kogda splyu (I miss you even when I sleep) by Igor Krutoy
2006	Rope	That's Right! by Jesse Cook
2006	Clubs	Tension music from Le Rêve by Benoît Jutras
2006	Ribbon	Lyrica by Todes
2005	Ball	Ya skuchayu po tebq, dazhe kogda splyu (I miss you even when I sleep) by Igor Krutoy
2005	Rope	That's Right! by Jesse Cook
2005	Clubs	Mirko music from Alegria: Cirque du Soleil by Rene Dupere
2005	Ribbon	Icare music from Alegria by Cirque du Soleil
2004	Hoop	Zorba's Dance by LCD (originally Mikis Theodorakis)
2004	Ball	Green Hornet music from Kill Bill by Al Hirt
2004	Clubs	Hu Ha by Montefiori Cocktail
2004	Ribbon	Queens music from Cirque du Soleil: La Nouba by Benoît Jutras
2003	Hoop	Zorba's Dance by LCD (originally Mikis Theodorakis)
2003	Ball	Nocturne by Chopin
2003	Clubs	A Gusta by Safri Duo
2003	Ribbon	Queens music from Cirque du Soleil: La Nouba by Benoît Jutras
2002	Hoop	Caravan by Anatoly Vekshin
2002	Rope	Tarantella by Anatoly Vekshin
2002	Clubs	Rumba by Anatoly Vekshin
2002	Ball	Rouans by Anatoly Vekshin
2001	Hoop	Caravan by Anatoly Vekshin
2001	Rope	Tarantella by Anatoly Vekshin
2001	Clubs	Rumba by Anatoly Vekshin
2001	Ball	Rouans by Anatoly Vekshin

== Detailed Olympic results ==
Year	Competition Description	Location	Music	Apparatus	Rank	Score-Final	Rank	Score-Qualifying
2008	Olympics	Beijing		All-around	2nd	71.925	4th	70.950
2008	Olympics	Beijing	Fragrant branch of white acacia	Ribbon	4th	17.825	4th	17.425
2008	Olympics	Beijing	Tanguera by Sexteto Mayor	Rope	3rd	18.125	4th	17.850
2008	Olympics	Beijing	Porto by Dulce Pontes	Hoop	3rd	18.125	4th	18.375
2008	Olympics	Beijing	The Terem Quartet	Clubs	3rd	17.850	4th	17.300

Year	Competition Description	Location	Music	Apparatus	Rank	Score-Final	Rank	Score-Qualifying
2004	Olympics	Athens		All-around	7th	100.575	8th	98.575
2004	Olympics	Athens	Queens from Cirque du Soleil: La Nouba	Ribbon	6th	25.075	6th	24.700
2004	Olympics	Athens	Green Hornet music from Kill Bill by Al Hirt	Ball	7th	25.300	12th	24.200
2004	Olympics	Athens	Zorba's Dance by LCD (originally Mikis Theodorakis)	Hoop	8th	25.000	10th	24.575
2004	Olympics	Athens	Hu Ha by Montefiori Cocktail	Clubs	7th	25.200	6th	25.100
