= Dinara Gimatova =

Azerbaijani rhythmic gymnast (born 1986)

- Born: 18 November 1986 (age 39) Astrakhan
- Height: 171 cm (5 ft 7 in)

Gymnastics career
- Discipline: Rhythmic gymnastics
- Country represented: Azerbaijan
- Former countries represented: Russia
- Head coach: Irina Viner
- Assistant coach: Valentina Ukleina
- Choreographer: Inna Grigoryeva
- Retired: Yes
Medal record
Representing Azerbaijan
World Championships
Bronze medal – third place	2007 Patras	Team
European Championships
Bronze medal – third place	2007 Baku	Team

Dinara Nailevna Gimatova (Tatar: Динара Наил кызы Гиматова; Dinara Nail qızı Gimatova, Russian: Динара Наильевна Гиматова; born 18 November 1986 in Astrakhan, Russian SFSR, Soviet Union) is an Azerbaijani gymnast of Volga Tatar ethnicity.

== Career ==
Dinara entered to the Olympic Reserve School led by Ludmila Tikhmirova, merited coach of USSR and began training with Nadezhda Kholodkova. In 1996, she became a member of the Russian national junior team. In 1999, Dinara won the Russian Hoops tournament, she was invited by Irina Viner and started training with her coach in Moscow.

She is a 4 time Azerbaijani champion, and a participant of World and European championships and many international tournaments. Dinara took 5th place in team performances at the 2005 Baku World championship and at the Moscow European Championships of the same year. In 2003, she won one silver and two bronze medals at the world cup stage tournament in Baku, a bronze medal on Grand Prix tournament in Tie, in 2004 she became the third for her performance with the clubs at the AGF Cup tournament in Baku, she is also a winner of the all round competition between teams of Russia and Azerbaijan.

Gimatova competed in the 2008 Summer Olympics and placed 11th in qualifying round. She retired in 2009 and went on to coach fellow competitor Aliya Garayeva, who finished 4th in the 2012 London Olympics.

== Coaching ==
Gimatova is now working as a coach in Moscow, her notable trainees have included :

- Aliya Garayeva
- Maria Titova

== See also ==
- Nationality changes in gymnastics
