= Air sports at the 2005 World Games – Parachuting accuracy landing =

Parachuting accuracy landing at the World Games
- Venue: Toeppersee Nordufer Duisburg, Duisburg, Germany
- Date: 16–17 July 2005
- Competitors: 16 from 11 nations

Medalists
1st place, gold medalist(s)		István Asztalos	Hungary
2nd place, silver medalist(s)		Stefan Wiesner	Germany
3rd place, bronze medalist(s)		Savaş Koçyiğit	Turkey

The accuracy landing event at the 2005 World Games in Duisburg was played from 16 to 17 July. 16 parachuters, from 11 nations, participated in the tournament. The competition took place at Toeppersee Nordufer Duisburg.

== Competition format ==
A total of six rounds were contested. Athlete with the lowest score is a winner.

== Results ==
Rank	Nation	Athlete	R1	R2	R3	R4	R5	R6	Sum	Add
1st place, gold medalist(s)	Hungary	István Asztalos	0.01	0.00	0.00	0.02	0.00	0.02	0.05	0.00/0.00
2nd place, silver medalist(s)	Germany	Stefan Wiesner	0.00	0.00	0.02	0.00	0.01	0.02	0.05	0.00/0.01
3rd place, bronze medalist(s)	Turkey	Savaş Koçyiğit	0.00	0.02	0.01	0.00	0.03	0.01	0.07	0.01
4	France	Philippe Valois	0.00	0.01	0.04	0.00	0.01	0.01	0.07	0.02
5	Russia	Vitaly Tuzov	0.00	0.02	0.03	0.02	0.02	0.00	0.09	
6	Germany	Annett Lückler	0.00	0.01	0.00	0.00	0.16	0.01	0.18	
7	Italy	Thomas Angerer	0.00	0.00	0.00	0.16	0.02	0.01	0.19	
8	Germany	Marco Pflüger	0.00	0.00	0.01	0.16	0.00	0.03	0.20	
9	Ukraine	Svitlana Dyachok	0.02	0.00	0.04	0.01	0.11	0.04	0.22	
10	Czech Republic	Michaela Dvořáková	0.02	0.03	0.00	0.02	0.16	0.00	0.23	
11	United States	Christopher Moore	0.01	0.16	0.00	0.01	0.05	0.03	0.26	
12	Croatia	Damir Sladetić	0.06	0.01	0.16	0.01	0.02	0.03	0.29	
13	Russia	Liubov Ekshikeeva	0.03	0.01	0.06	0.01	0.16	0.10	0.37	
14	Chinese Taipei	Wang Ke-qing	0.00	0.12	0.00	0.02	0.16	0.16	0.46	
15	Czech Republic	Miloš Jurča	0.16	0.01	0.16	0.16	0.00	0.00	0.49	
16	Turkey	Ayla Çelik	0.16	0.01	0.00	0.01	0.16	0.16	0.50	
