= Dancesport at the 2005 World Games – Rock'n'Roll =

Dancesport rock'n'roll at the 2005 World Games
- Venue: König Pilsener Arena
- Dates: 16–17 July 2001
- Competitors: 40 from 14 nations

Medalists
1st place, gold medalist(s)		Christophe Payan; Diane Eonin	France
2nd place, silver medalist(s)		Ivan Yudin; Olga Sbitneva	Russia
3rd place, bronze medalist(s)		Alexis Chardenoux; Fanny Delebecque	France

The rock'n'roll competition in dancesport at the 2005 World Games took place from 16 to 17 July 2005 at the König Pilsener Arena in Oberhausen, Germany.

== Competition format ==
A total of 20 pairs entered the competition. Best twelve pairs from round one qualifies to the semifinal. From semifinal the best seven pairs qualifies to the final.

== Results ==
Rank	Athletes	Nation	Round 1	Semifinal	Final
1st place, gold medalist(s)	Christophe Payan/Diane Eonin	France	Q	Q	1
2nd place, silver medalist(s)	Ivan Yudin/Olga Sbitneva	Russia	Q	Q	2
3rd place, bronze medalist(s)	Alexis Chardenoux/Fanny Delebecque	France	Q	Q	3
4	Bernd Diel/Daniela Bechtold	Germany	Q	Q	4
5	Andre Di Giovanni/Meike Lameli	Germany	Q	Q	5
6	Matjaž Izak/Simona Turk	Slovenia	Q	Q	6
7	Vítězslav Horák/Sandra Chudomska	Czech Republic	Q	Q	
8	Zdeněk Adamec/Petra Holovska	Czech Republic	Q		
9	Thomas Weber/Susanne Weber	Switzerland	Q		
10	Wim Wouters/Griet Verheyen	Belgium	Q		
11	Sergej Lyaschenko/Nataliya Proskurina	Ukraine	Q		
12	Neven Ivić/Ivana Mihalić	Croatia	Q		
13	Tomislav Matacun/Dinka Lelić	Croatia			
14	Alexey Nikolaev/Evgenija Nikeenkova	Russia			
15	Marc Schuler/Nadine Andeer	Switzerland			
16	Mark Horvath/Katalin Kis	Hungary			
17	Torgny Lindbäck/Marie Meck-Jordestam	Sweden			
18	Brano Bucko/Zuzana Martinovicova	Slovakia			
19	Bernhard Berg/Alexandra Mader	Austria			
20	Anders Bakken/Hilde Slaaen-Bakken	Norway			
