= Rhythmic gymnastics at the 2005 World Games – Rope =

Rhythmic gymnastics - rope at the 2005 World Games
- Venue: Theater am Marientor
- Date: 20 July 2005
- Competitors: 22 from 18 nations
- Winning total: 16.700 points

Medalists
1st place, gold medalist(s)		(Ukraine) Anna Bessonova
2nd place, silver medalist(s)		(Russia) Vera Sessina
3rd place, bronze medalist(s)		(Ukraine) Natalia Godunko

The rope event in rhythmic gymnastics at the 2005 World Games in Duisburg was played on 20 July. The competition took place at Theater am Marientor.

== Competition format ==
A total of 22 athletes entered the competition. The best eight athletes from preliminary round advances to the final.

== Results ==
=== Preliminary ===
Rank	Athlete	Nation	Score	Note
1	Olga Kapranova	Russia	16.600	Q
1	Anna Bessonova	Ukraine	16.600	Q
3	Natalia Godunko	Ukraine	16.300	Q
4	Vera Sessina	Russia	16.000	Q
5	Inna Zhukova	Belarus	15.600	Q
6	Svetlana Rudalova	Belarus	14.850	Q
7	Elizabeth Paisieva	Bulgaria	14.275	Q
8	Aliya Yussupova	Kazakhstan	14.050	Q
9	Maria Ringinen	Finland	13.475	
10	Anna Gurbanova	Azerbaijan	13.450	
11	Julieta Cantaluppi	Italy	13.175	
12	Dominika Červenková	Czech Republic	12.825	
13	Yukari Murata	Japan	12.775	
14	Cynthia Valdez	Mexico	12.650	
15	Stela Sultanova	Bulgaria	12.525	
16	Fruzsina Benyó	Hungary	12.275	
17	Alexandra Orlando	Canada	12.125	
18	Daria Stolbina	Germany	12.100	
19	Olga Karmansky	United States	12.075	
20	Caroline Weber	Austria	11.775	
21	Inês Margarida Neves Gomes	Portugal	10.825	
22	Stephanie Sandler	South Africa	10.000	

=== Final ===
Rank	Athlete	Nation	Score
1st place, gold medalist(s)	Anna Bessonova	Ukraine	16.700
2nd place, silver medalist(s)	Vera Sessina	Russia	16.375
3rd place, bronze medalist(s)	Natalia Godunko	Ukraine	16.125
4	Inna Zhukova	Belarus	16.000
5	Aliya Yussupova	Kazakhstan	16.000
6	Olga Kapranova	Russia	15.600
7	Svetlana Rudalova	Belarus	14.525
8	Elizabeth Paisieva	Bulgaria	14.275
