= Powerlifting at the 2005 World Games – Women's heavyweight =

Powerlifting women's heavyweight at the 2005 World Games
- Venue: Rheinhausenhalle, Duisburg, Germany
- Date: 16 July 2005
- Competitors: 11 from 7 nations

Medalists
gold medal	(Russia) Marina Kudinova
silver medal	(Russia) Galina Karpova
bronze medal	(Ukraine) Iryna Yavorska

The women's heavyweight competition in powerlifting at the 2005 World Games took place on 16 July 2005 at the Rheinhausenhalle in Duisburg, Germany.

== Competition format ==
A total of 11 athletes entered the competition. Each athlete had 3 attempts in each of 3 events: squat, bench press and deadlift. The athlete with the biggest score in Wilks points is the winner.

== Results ==
Rank	Athlete	Nation	Weight	Squat	Bench press	Deadlift	Total weight	Total points
1st place, gold medalist(s)	Marina Kudinova	Russia	67.70	247.5	150.0	225.0	622.5	634.01
2nd place, silver medalist(s)	Galina Karpova	Russia	123.45	305.0 WR	192.5 WR	240.0	737.5 WR	586.79
3rd place, bronze medalist(s)	Iryna Yavorska	Ukraine	87.55	262.5	172.5 WR	232.5	667.5	583.66
4	Inger Blikra	Norway	74.30	230.0	130.0	220.0	580.0	554.65
5	Tamara Bahriy	Ukraine	73.10	200.0	137.5	232.5	570.0	550.79
6	Ielja Strik	Netherlands	85.45	245.0	165.0	212.5	622.5	550.50
7	Jessica O'Donnell	United States	92.45	252.5	157.5	230.0	640.0	547.10
8	Joanne Schaefer	Netherlands	104.95	240.0	170.0	215.0	625.0	513.62
9	Lizabeth Willett	United States	151.60	275.0	120.0	225.0	620.0	476.84
	Eva-Maria Gall	Germany	72.00	175.0	NM	-	DSQ	DSQ
	Chao Chen-yeh	Chinese Taipei	118.95	200.0	100.0	NM	DSQ	DSQ
