= Powerlifting at the 2005 World Games – Women's middleweight =

Powerlifting women's middleweight at the 2005 World Games
- Venue: Rheinhausenhalle, Duisburg, Germany
- Date: 16 July 2005
- Competitors: 10 from 9 nations

Medalists
gold medal	(Ukraine) Larysa Vitsiyevska
silver medal	(United States) Priscilla Ribic
bronze medal	(Uzbekistan) Nadezhda Malyugina

The women's middleweight competition in powerlifting at the 2005 World Games took place on 16 July 2005 at the Rheinhausenhalle in Duisburg, Germany.

== Competition format ==
A total of 10 athletes entered the competition. Each athlete had 3 attempts in each of 3 events: squat, bench press and deadlift. The athlete with the biggest score in Wilks points is the winner.

== Results ==
Rank	Athlete	Nation	Weight	Squat	Bench press	Deadlift	Total weight	Total points
1st place, gold medalist(s)	Larysa Vitsiyevska	Ukraine	62.30	205.0	145.0	225.0	575.0	622.78
2nd place, silver medalist(s)	Priscilla Ribic	United States	66.95	222.5	142.5	227.5	592.5	608.29
3rd place, bronze medalist(s)	Nadezhda Malyugina	Uzbekistan	60.45	195.0	115.0	200.0	510.0	565.33
4	Ayako Ikeya	Japan	55.35	180.0	110.0	175.0	465.0	552.16
5	Päivi Haapoja	Finland	59.65	195.0	90.0	197.5	482.5	540.37
6	Gundula von Bachhaus	Germany	65.40	182.5	130.0	192.5	505.0	527.42
7	Marian Gibson	(United Kingdom) Great Britain	65.85	175.0	135.0	195.0	505.0	524.74
8	Ana Garcia-Agundes	France	56.70	152.5	95.0	170.0	417.5	486.47
	Carly Nogle	United States	65.30	NM	-	-	DSQ	DSQ
	Antonietta Orsini	Italy	66.40	210.0	NM	-	DSQ	DSQ
