= Powerlifting at the 2005 World Games – Women's lightweight =

Powerlifting women's lightweight at the 2005 World Games
- Venue: Rheinhausenhalle, Duisburg, Germany
- Date: 16 July 2005
- Competitors: 13 from 9 nations

Medalists
gold medal	(Russia) Olesya Lafina
silver medal	(Ukraine) Olena Dmytruk
bronze medal	(Chinese Taipei) Chen Wei-ling

The women's lightweight competition in powerlifting at the 2005 World Games took place on 16 July 2005 at the Rheinhausenhalle in Duisburg, Germany.

== Competition format ==
A total of 13 athletes entered the competition. Each athlete had 3 attempts in each of 3 events: squat, bench press and deadlift. The athlete with the biggest score in Wilks points is the winner.

== Results ==
Rank	Athlete	Nation	Weight	Squat	Bench press	Deadlift	Total weight	Total points
1st place, gold medalist(s)	Olesya Lafina	Russia	51.65	220.0 WR	127.5	147.5	495.0	620.30
2nd place, silver medalist(s)	Olena Dmytruk	Ukraine	51.80	182.5	117.5	172.5	472.5	590.81
3rd place, bronze medalist(s)	Chen Wei-ling	Chinese Taipei	45.35	172.5	72.5	182.5	427.5	589.67
4	Yukako Fukushima	Japan	47.40	157.5	125.0	157.5	440.0	588.15
5	Raija Koskinen	Finland	43.80	160.0	80.0	157.5	397.5	561.38
6	Stephanie Cornette	France	52.00	180.0	97.5	170.0	447.5	557.85
7	Jennifer Maile	United States	51.70	167.5	105.0	170.0	442.5	554.09
8	Chou Yi-ju	Chinese Taipei	49.65	162.5	77.5	180.0	420.0	542.43
9	Caitlin Miller	United States	52.00	150.0	70.0	157.5	377.5	470.59
10	Marion Friedrich	Germany	44.75	130.0	82.5	120.0	332.5	462.87
	Yolimar Cobos	Venezuela	50.80	155.0	NM	-	DSQ	DSQ
	Mervi Sirkiä	Finland	51.35	155.0	NM	-	DSQ	DSQ
	Mervi Rantamäki	Finland	51.90	NM	-	-	DSQ	DSQ
