= Powerlifting at the 2005 World Games – Men's heavyweight =

Powerlifting men's heavyweight at the 2005 World Games
- Venue: Rheinhausenhalle, Duisburg, Germany
- Date: 17 July 2005
- Competitors: 13 from 9 nations

Medalists
gold medal	(Russia) Nikolay Suslov
silver medal	(United States) Brian Siders
bronze medal	(Ukraine) Ivan Freydun

The men's heavyweight competition in powerlifting at the 2005 World Games took place on 17 July 2005 at the Rheinhausenhalle in Duisburg, Germany.

== Competition format ==
A total of 13 athletes entered the competition. Each athlete had 3 attempts in each of 3 events: squat, bench press and deadlift. The athlete with the biggest score in Wilks points is the winner.

== Results ==
Rank	Athlete	Nation	Weight	Squat	Bench press	Deadlift	Total weight	Total points
1st place, gold medalist(s)	Nikolay Suslov	Russia	111.15	405.0	275.0	372.5	1052.5	617.44
2nd place, silver medalist(s)	Brian Siders	United States	154.40	420.0	330.0	362.5	1112.5	612.98
3rd place, bronze medalist(s)	Ivan Freydun	Ukraine	97.95	360.0	282.5	347.5	990.0	607.61
4	Jörgen Ljungberg	Sweden	127.15	422.5	270.0	350.0	1042.5	592.08
5	Brad Gillingham	United States	147.45	387.5	272.5	372.5	1032.5	572.67
6	Anibal Coimbra	Luxembourg	98.25	355.0	235.0	342.5	932.5	571.62
7	Fredrik Svensson	Sweden	151.20	352.5	312.5	310.0	975.0	538.88
8	Jewgenij Kondraschow	Germany	137.95	355.0	265.0	340.0	960.0	537.64
9	Frode Rui	Norway	125.00	350.0	242.5	335.0	927.5	528.48
10	Alexander Hoffmann	Germany	121.85	385.0	215.0	320.0	920.0	527.11
11	Tibor Mészáros	Hungary	141.60	330.0	210.0	330.0	870.0	485.37
	Orhan Bilican	Belgium	108.80	370.0	NM	-	DSQ	DSQ
	Nicholas Tylutki	United States	101.35	345.0	NM	-	DSQ	DSQ
