= Finswimming at the 2005 World Games – Men's 50 m apnoea =

Competition held in Duisburg, Germany

Finswimming – men's 50 m apnoea at the 2005 World Games
- Venue: Sportpark Wedau, Schwimmstadion, Duisburg, Germany
- Date: 22 July 2005
- Competitors: 18 from 11 nations

Medalists
gold medal	(Russia) Evgeny Skorzhenko
silver medal	(Estonia) Nikolai Tover
bronze medal	(Ukraine) Igor Soroka

The men's 50 m apnoea competition in finswimming at the 2005 World Games took place on 22 July 2005 at the Schwimmstadion in Sportpark Wedau in Duisburg, Germany.

== Competition format ==
A total of 18 athletes entered the competition. The best eight athletes from preliminary round qualifies to the final.

== Results ==
=== Preliminary ===
Rank	Athlete	Nation	Time	Note
1	Evgeny Skorzhenko	Russia	14.35	Q
2	Andrey Burakov	Russia	14.71	Q
3	Riccardo Galli	Italy	14.94	Q
4	Nikolai Tover	Estonia	14.99	Q
5	Li Yi	China	15.03	Q
6	Yuan Haifeng	China	15.07	Q
7	Igor Soroka	Ukraine	15.11	Q
8	Ha Gi-bong	South Korea	15.56	Q
9	Hideaki Sakai	Japan	15.58	
10	Enrico Schultz	Germany	15.69	
10	Kim Tae-kyun	South Korea	15.69	
12	Athanasios Gkougkos	Greece	15.74	
13	Sami Sorri	Finland	15.80	
14	Erven Morice	France	15.85	
15	Kimmo Korja	Finland	15.86	
16	Michail Papadopoulos	Greece	16.41	
17	Yves Rolack	Germany	17.01	
	Cesare Fumarola	Italy	DNS	

=== Final ===
Rank	Athlete	Nation	Time
1st place, gold medalist(s)	Evgeny Skorzhenko	Russia	14.35
2nd place, silver medalist(s)	Nikolai Tover	Estonia	14.79
3rd place, bronze medalist(s)	Igor Soroka	Ukraine	14.83
4	Andrey Burakov	Russia	14.95
5	Yuan Haifeng	China	14.96
6	Li Yi	China	15.05
7	Riccardo Galli	Italy	15.11
8	Ha Gi-bong	South Korea	15.48
