= Powerlifting at the 2001 World Games – Women's lightweight =

Powerlifting women's lightweight at the 2001 World Games
- Venue: Akita City Culture Hall, Akita, Japan
- Date: 20 August 2001
- Competitors: 12 from 7 nations

Medalists
gold medal	(Finland) Raija Koskinen
silver medal	(Chinese Taipei) Chen Kuan-ting
bronze medal	(Japan) Yukako Fukushima

The women's lightweight competition in powerlifting at the 2001 World Games took place on 20 August 2001 at the Akita City Culture Hall in Akita, Japan.

== Competition format ==
A total of 12 athletes entered the competition. Each athlete had 3 attempts in each of 3 events: squat, bench press and deadlift. The athlete with the biggest score in Wilks points is the winner.

== Results ==
Rank	Athlete	Nation	Weight	Squat	Bench press	Deadlift	Total weight	Total points
1st place, gold medalist(s)	Raija Koskinen	Finland	43.9	170.0	72.5	162.5	405.0	571.131
2nd place, silver medalist(s)	Chen Kuan-ting	Chinese Taipei	47.9	175.0	90.0	155.0	420.0	557.130
3rd place, bronze medalist(s)	Yukako Fukushima	Japan	47.3	145.0	117.5 WR	145.0	407.5	545.520
4	Riitta Liimatainen	Sweden	51.4	170.5	92.5	170.0	432.5	543.999
5	Nataliya Shapovalova	Russia	48.7	165.0	87.5	160.0	412.5	540.499
6	Chen Wei-ling	Chinese Taipei	43.6	152.5	67.5	160.0	380.0	538.308
7	Lin Li-min	Chinese Taipei	51.5	165.0	97.5	160.0	422.5	530.660
8	Jennifer Maile	United States	50.2	157.5	90.0	220.0	535.0	529.276
9	Suzanne Hartwig	United States	49.6	150.0	82.5	160.0	407.5	521.926
10	Azusa Hara	Japan	43.5	142.5	70.0	130.0	342.5	485.939
11	Jacqueline Sandu	Canada	51.6	142.5	67.5	157.5	367.5	406.882
	Tatyana Eltsova	Russia	51.8	NM	-	-	DNF	DNF
