= Powerlifting at the 1997 World Games – Women's heavyweight =

Powerlifting women's heavyweight at the 1997 World Games
- Venue: Lahti, Finland
- Date: 8 August 1997
- Competitors: 5 from 4 nations

Medalists
gold medal	(Sweden) Lisa Sjöstrand
silver medal	(Chinese Taipei) Lee Chia-sui
bronze medal	(Chinese Taipei) Chao Chen-ye

The women's heavyweight competition in powerlifting at the 1997 World Games took place on 8 August 1997 in Lahti, Finland.

== Competition format ==
A total of 5 athletes entered the competition. Each athlete had 3 attempts in each of 3 events: squat, bench press and deadlift. Athlete, who came with the biggest score in Wilks points is the winner.

== Results ==
Rank	Athlete	Nation	Weight	Squat	Bench press	Deadlift	Total weight	Total points
1st place, gold medalist(s)	Lisa Sjöstrand	Sweden	68.3	215.0	115.0	232.5	562.5	569.30
2nd place, silver medalist(s)	Lee Chia-sui	Chinese Taipei	114.6	265.0	147.5	245.0	657.5	530.23
3rd place, bronze medalist(s)	Chao Chen-ye	Chinese Taipei	104.7	245.0	175.0	220.0	640.0	526.28
4	Vali Isakandarova	Kazakhstan	68.0	207.5	107.5	197.5	512.5	520.32
5	Anne Sigrid Stiklestad	Norway	76.8	225.0	112.5	200.0	537.5	503.58
