= Rhythmic gymnastics at the 2005 World Games =

- Venue: Theater am Marientor
- Dates: 20–21 July 2005
- Competitors: 22 from 18 nations

The rhythmic gymnastics events at the 2005 World Games in Duisburg was played between 20 and 21 July. 22 rhythmic gymnastics competitors, from 18 nations, participated in the tournament. The rhythmic gymnastics competition took place at Theater am Marientor.

== Participating nations ==
- Austria (1)
- Azerbaijan (1)
- Belarus (2)
- Bulgaria (2)
- Canada (1)
- Czech Republic (1)
- Finland (1)
- Germany (1)
- Hungary (1)
- Italy (1)
- Japan (1)
- Kazakhstan (1)
- Mexico (1)
- Portugal (1)
- Russia (2)
- South Africa (1)
- Ukraine (2)
- United States (1)

== Medal table ==
Rank	Nation	Gold	Silver	Bronze	Total
1	Russia	3	1	1	5
2	Ukraine	1	2	3	6
3	Kazakhstan	0	1	0	1
Totals (3 entries)		4	4	4	12

== Events ==
Event	Gold	Silver	Bronze
Rope	Anna Bessonova; Ukraine	Vera Sessina; Russia	Natalia Godunko; Ukraine
Ball	Olga Kapranova; Russia	Anna Bessonova; Ukraine	Vera Sessina; Russia
Clubs	Olga Kapranova; Russia	Aliya Yussupova; Kazakhstan	Natalia Godunko; Ukraine
Ribbon	Vera Sessina; Russia	Natalia Godunko; Ukraine	Anna Bessonova; Ukraine
