= Powerlifting at the 1997 World Games – Women's lightweight =

Powerlifting women's lightweight at the 1997 World Games
- Venue: Lahti, Finland
- Date: 8 August 1997
- Competitors: 6 from 5 nations

Medalists
gold medal	(Chinese Taipei) Lin Li-min
silver medal	(Finland) Raija Koskinen
bronze medal	(Kazakhstan) Nadezhda Mir

The women's lightweight competition in powerlifting at the 1997 World Games took place on 8 August 1997 in Lahti, Finland.

== Competition format ==
A total of 6 athletes entered the competition. Each athlete had 3 attempts in each of 3 events: squat, bench press and deadlift. Athlete, who came with the biggest score in Wilks points is the winner.

== Results ==
Rank	Athlete	Nation	Weight	Squat	Bench press	Deadlift	Total weight	Total points
1st place, gold medalist(s)	Lin Li-min	Chinese Taipei	51.6	170.0	106.0	165.0	440.0	551.80
2nd place, silver medalist(s)	Raija Koskinen	Finland	47.5	171.0	82.5	157.5	410.0	547.18
3rd place, bronze medalist(s)	Nadezhda Mir	Kazakhstan	51.4	160.0	92.5	170.0	422.5	531.42
4	Anna-Liisa Prinkkala	Finland	43.9	145.0	60.0	157.5	362.5	511.19
5	Elisabeth Street	United States	50.4	150.0	75.0	155.0	380.0	485.22
	Claudine Cognacq	Denmark	51.3	160.0	82.5	NM	DSQ	DSQ
