= Stefi Cohen =

Venezuelan-American weightlifter (born 1992)

Dr Stefi Cohen
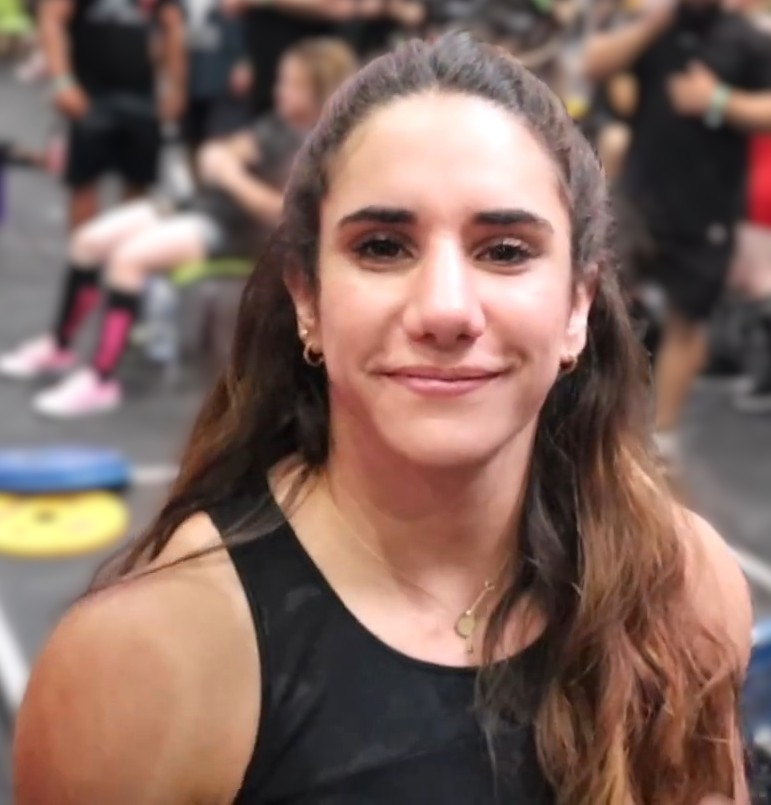
- Cohen in 2019

Personal information
- Born: Stefanie Cohen Magarici; 1992 (age 33–34) Caracas, Venezuela
- Education: DPT University of Miami
- Height: 5 ft (152 cm)
- Weight: 123 lb (56 kg)
- Website: www.instagram.com/steficohen

Sport
- Country: United States
- Sport: Powerlifting, Boxing
- Former partners: Tristan Hamm, Hayden Bowe

Stefi Cohen is a Venezuelan American weightlifter, boxer, and fitness writer and influencer. She has set 25 world records in powerlifting, including being the first woman to deadlift over four times her own bodyweight. As of December 2025 she holds powerlifting world records in three separate weight classes, and has fought six professional boxing matches, with a 4-1-1 record. She holds a doctorate in physical therapy, co-founded two online fitness coaching programs, co-wrote a book on training and back pain, and posts widely read training advice, with her Instagram account having over a million followers.

== Early life ==
Cohen was born Stefanie Cohen Magarici in a Jewish household in Caracas, Venezuela, in 1992. Her father was an immigrant from Morocco and her mother a second-generation immigrant from Romania.

From 2006 to 2009, Cohen played on the Venezuela women's national under-17 football team, with her last year being the team captain. When she turned 17 in 2009, she left Venezuela for a soccer scholarship to San Diego State University, however once there she realized that she was no longer the best, or even as good as, the girls on her team.

In 2010, aged 18, she gave up soccer and transferred to the University of Miami in Florida because Miami felt closer to her Hispanic background. However she did not want to give up sports, and was introduced to CrossFit by her classmate, future CrossFit champion Noah Ohlsen. She says she focused on the weightlifting part of CrossFit, because it was what she was weakest at. She did Olympic weightlifting for four years, then switched to powerlifting.

== Powerlifting ==
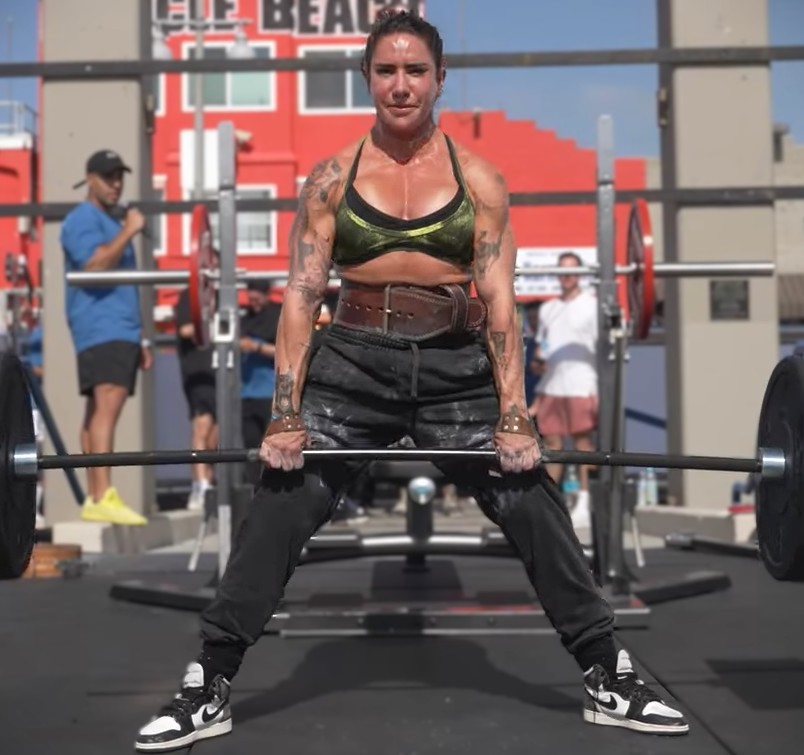
Cohen lifts 140kg at Muscle Beach Venice in 2022

Cohen's first powerlifting competition was in April 2015; she first competed in the 123 pounds (56 kg) weight class, and was able to deadlift three times her bodyweight. In October 2015, Cohen took a first place at a Florida State weightlifting competition. In 2016, Cohen competed in four competitions, and won the American Powerlifting Association national championship for her weight class.

On August 26, 2017, at WRPF Boss of Bosses IV, Cohen deadlifted 4.4 times her bodyweight, lifting 485 pounds (220 kg) while weighing 121 pounds (55 kg). This was the all-time world record for her weight class and the first time any woman had ever deadlifted four times her bodyweight in competition. In October 2017, she deadlifted 525 pounds (238 kg), which was not an official record as she used weightlifting straps. In November 2017, she deadlifted 496 pounds (225 kg) for another official world record.

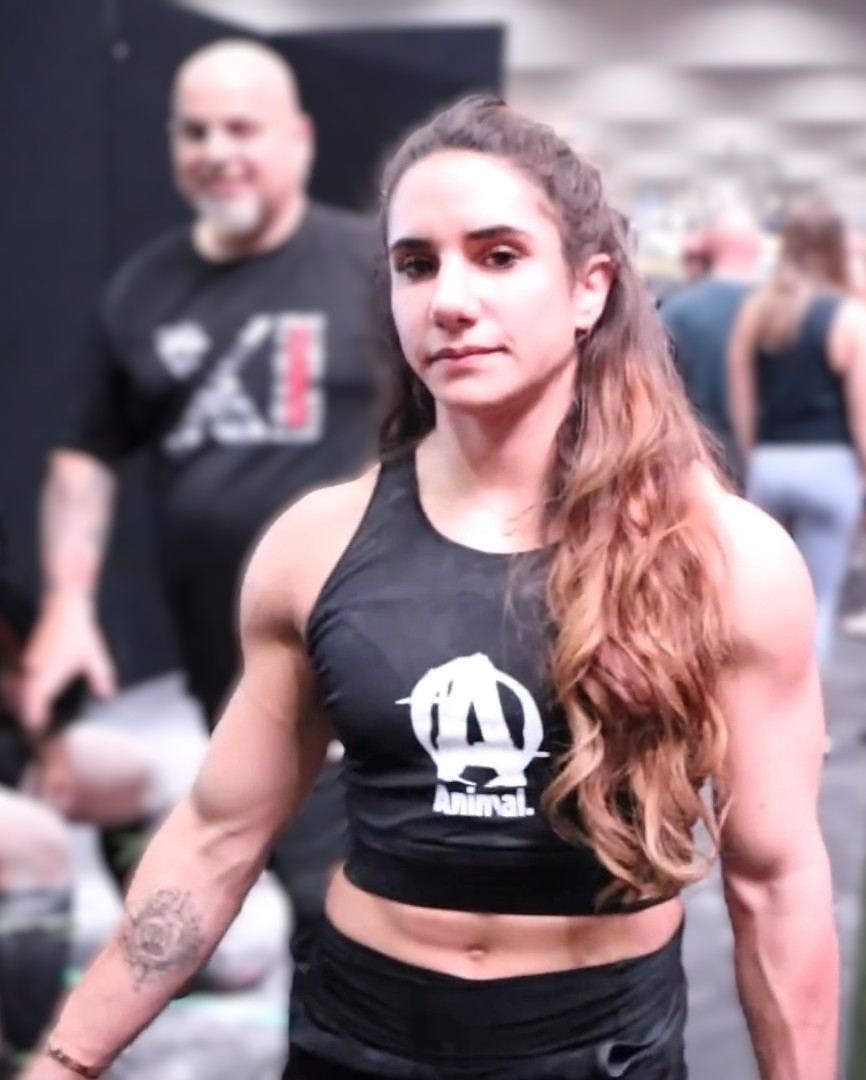
Cohen in 2019

In March 2018, Cohen unofficially deadlifted 545 pounds, 4.5 times her body weight, at the Arnold Sports Festival. In May 2018, at the Kern US Open, she officially broke the 500 pounds (230 kg) barrier, by deadlifting 518 pounds (235 kg) while weighing 119.4 pounds (54.2 kg), setting two world records, for deadlift and total lift of 1,174 pounds (533 kg) with wraps. She wrote that she had to skip her graduation commencement ceremony for the event, but it was worth it. In August 2018, while weighing in at 121.4 pounds (55.1 kg), she took two world records for squatting 419 pounds (190 kg) and total squat, bench and deadlift 1,157 pounds (525 kg), without equipment, as well as setting the highest ever Wilks coefficient at 628.29.

In March 2019, Cohen squatted 495 pounds at the Arnold Classic, unofficially 11 pounds over the world record for her weight class. In April 2019, Cohen took a total second place at the WRPF Kern US Open, but set a world record for deadlifting 529.1 pounds (240.0 kg), which record still stands as of December 2025.

In February 2020, Cohen went down a weight class to be able to break more world records. She alternated a hot sauna and a cold pool to cut 10 pounds (4.5 kg) of water weight on the night before the competition. She weighed 114.2 pounds (51.8 kg), down from her regular 123 pounds (56 kg), when she deadlifted 456 pounds (207 kg), squatted 446 pounds (202 kg) and bench pressed 226 pounds (103 kg), for a total of 1,124 pounds (510 kg), which broke world records for deadlift, barbell squat, and total lift for her weight class, and brought her total world records to 25. These squat and total powerlifting world records still stand for the 114 pounds (52 kg) category as of December 2025.

Between 2020 and 2025, Cohen left competitive powerlifting for boxing. On October 10, 2025, she returned to powerlifting at the IPL Olympia Pro Powerlifting event, and set another world record, this time for the 132 pounds (60 kg) weight class, by raw squatting 407.9 pounds (185 kg). This met her goal, stated since at least 2017, to break powerlifting world records in the 114, 123, and 132-pound weight classes.

Cohen has several times said that her ultimate goal is to deadlift 600 pounds (270 kg). She founded a web site, "Road to 600", dedicated to sharing her progress to attempting that goal in Dubai 2025.

== Boxing ==
In 2020, Cohen moved from competitive powerlifting to professional boxing. She was trained by Miami coach Pedro Diaz.

Cohen had her first competitive boxing match on June 4, 2021, in Santo Domingo, Dominican Republic, when she defeated Haydee Zapa by knockout in three rounds. On September 18, she had a draw in her second boxing match against Marcelo Nieto in Dubai, UAE. She won her third match, against Karla Valenzuela, in Miami on February 11, 2022. She took her first loss against Devany Cuevas on July 22, 2022, in Miami. She defeated Leanne Calderon in Indio, California on February 23, 2023. She defeated Esli Cervantes on June 9, 2023, in Commerce, California, for a 4-1-1 record as of December 2025.

== Fitness coaching ==
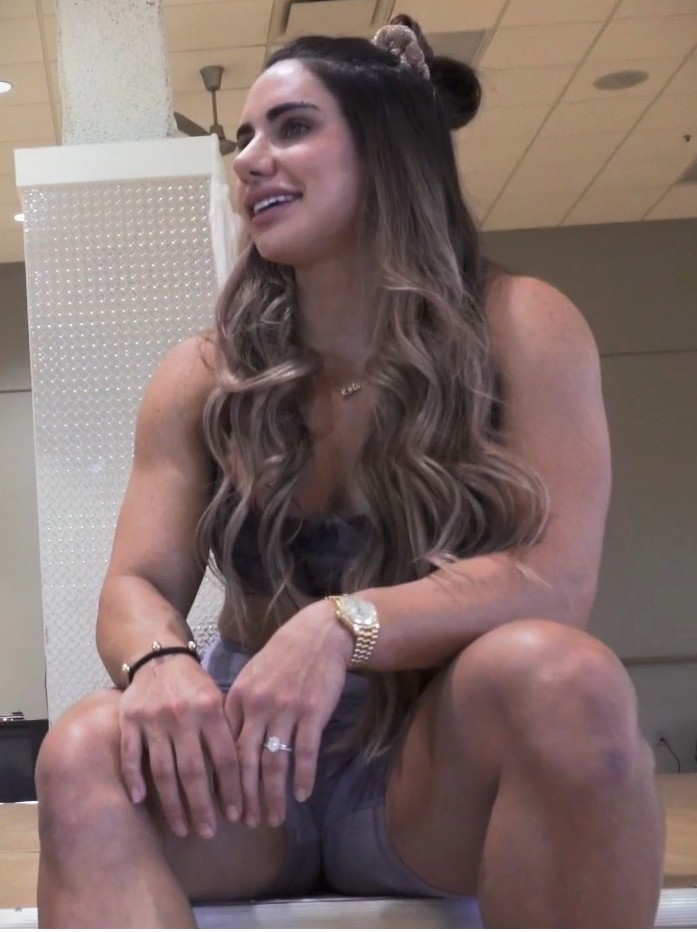
Cohen in 2020

In 2018, Cohen earned a Doctor of Physical Therapy degree from the University of Miami. She uses it to teach exercise training and nutrition. Her writing is published in magazines such as Men's Health and Muscle & Fitness and on her Instagram site, from which it is reprinted on web sites such as EssentiallySports and FitnessVolt. Her Instagram account has over a million followers.

Cohen founded the online coaching platform called the Hybrid Performance Method with her fiancé Hayden Bowe, in 2015–2016, during her first year of graduate school. It was a single program combining powerlifting, Olympic weightlifting, and bodybuilding, with the motto "Look like a bodybuilder, lift like a powerlifter, move like a weightlifter". They opened a gym with that name in Miami in 2018.

In early 2017, Cohen injured her back to the point that she says she couldn't even walk without pain. She tried different methods to recover and later that year would break the world record for a 4x bodyweight deadlift. She used that experience for the motivation in publishing her book, Back in Motion (ISBN 9781735510910), with Ian Kaplan, Hybrid COO, through the Hybrid Performance Method website in 2020. Its principle was based on autoregulation, adjusting the user's exercise program to what their body was telling them.

Cohen was removed from the Hybrid Performance Method plan and website between June and September 2023. In December 2023, Cohen and new boyfriend Tristan Hamm, Canadian influencer and boxer, released the Revived Method fitness plan and website.

== Dropped legal charges ==
In May 2024, Cohen was arrested for sexual cyberharassment for allegedly reposting her ex-boyfriend's new girlfriend's nude photos online. Hayden Bowe claimed that in March 2022, Cohen found his laptop in the house they shared, guessed his password, and reposted the photos to humiliate his new partner. Police stated that during the arrest Cohen tried to sweep an officer with her leg, then broke the police car door locking mechanism with her toes. Charges were dismissed on October 3, 2025.

In July 2025, Cohen was arrested for domestic violence, accused of scratching her partner Tristan Hamm. Charges were dropped when Hamm denied any battery took place, and said Cohen was only arrested due to extortion from an illegal immigrant who had defrauded her for years.

In her return to powerlifting on October 10, 2025, Cohen wore a T-shirt with her mug shot and the word "Acquitted". She followed up with an Instagram post celebrating victory in her years of legal struggle, and thanking Hamm for standing by her.
