= Karate at the 2005 World Games – Men's kumite 70 kg =

Men's kumite 70 kg at the 2005 World Games
- Venue: Kfraftzentrale
- Date: 23 July 2005
- Competitors: 7 from 7 nations

Medalists
| 1st place, gold medalist(s) | | (Italy) Giuseppe Di Domenico |
| 2nd place, silver medalist(s) | | (Mexico) Emilio Oviedo |
| 3rd place, bronze medalist(s) | | (Russia) Sayguidmagomed Shakhrudinov |

The men's kumite 70 kg competition in karate at the 2005 World Games took place on 23 July 2005 at the Kfraftzentrale in Duisburg, Germany.

== Competition format ==
A total of 7 athletes entered the competition. In elimination round they fought in two groups. From this stage the best two athletes qualifies to the semifinals.

== Results ==
=== Elimination round ===
==== Group A ====
| Rank | Athlete | B | W | D | L | Pts | Score |
|---|---|---|---|---|---|---|---|
| 1 | Emilio Oviedo (MEX) | 2 | 2 | 0 | 0 | 4 | 12–2 |
| 2 | Mensur Cakić (BIH) | 2 | 1 | 0 | 1 | 2 | 5–6 |
| 3 | Zen Rajab (AUS) | 2 | 0 | 0 | 2 | 0 | 2–11 |

| | Score | |
|---|---|---|
| Emilio Oviedo (MEX) | 4–2 | Mensur Cakić (BIH) |
| Zen Rajab (AUS) | 2–3 | Mensur Cakić (BIH) |
| Zen Rajab (AUS) | 0–8 | Emilio Oviedo (MEX) |

==== Group B ====
| Rank | Athlete | B | W | D | L | Pts | Score |
|---|---|---|---|---|---|---|---|
| 1 | Giuseppe Di Domenico (ITA) | 3 | 2 | 0 | 1 | 4 | 18–10 |
| 2 | Sayguidmagomed Shakhrudinov (RUS) | 3 | 1 | 1 | 1 | 3 | 15–19 |
| 3 | Shinji Nagaki (JPN) | 3 | 1 | 1 | 1 | 3 | 9–16 |
| 4 | Mohamed El-Shemy (EGY) | 3 | 1 | 0 | 2 | 2 | 12–9 |

| | Score | |
|---|---|---|
| Giuseppe Di Domenico (ITA) | 4–3 | Mohamed El-Shemy (EGY) |
| Sayguidmagomed Shakhrudinov (RUS) | 6–6 | Shinji Nagaki (JPN) |
| Giuseppe Di Domenico (ITA) | 6–7 | Sayguidmagomed Shakhrudinov (RUS) |
| Mohamed El-Shemy (EGY) | 2–3 | Shinji Nagaki (JPN) |
| Giuseppe Di Domenico (ITA) | 8–0 | Shinji Nagaki (JPN) |
| Mohamed El-Shemy (EGY) | 7–2 | Sayguidmagomed Shakhrudinov (RUS) |

=== Finals ===
Semifinals
Emilio Oviedo (MEX) | 2
Sayguidmagomed Shakhrudinov (RUS) | 0
Giuseppe Di Domenico (ITA) | 7
Mensur Cakić (BIH) | 1

Final
Emilio Oviedo (MEX) | 1
Giuseppe Di Domenico (ITA) | 2
Third place
Sayguidmagomed Shakhrudinov (RUS) | 8
Mensur Cakić (BIH) | 4
