= Powerlifting at the 2009 World Games – Women's lightweight =

Powerlifting women's lightweight at the 2009 World Games
- Venue: National Sun Yat-sen University, Sun Yat-San Hall, Kaohsiung, Taiwan
- Date: 25 July 2009
- Competitors: 10 from 8 nations

Medalists
gold medal	(Chinese Taipei) Chen Wei-ling
silver medal	(Japan) Yukako Fukushima
bronze medal	(Indonesia) Sri Hartati

The women's lightweight competition in powerlifting at the 2009 World Games took place on 25 July 2009 at the National Sun Yat-sen University, Sun Yat-San Hall in Kaohsiung, Taiwan.

== Competition format ==
A total of 10 athletes entered the competition. Each athlete had 3 attempts in each of 3 events: squat, bench press and deadlift. The athlete with the biggest score in Wilks points is the winner.

== Results ==
Rank	Athlete	Nation	Weight	Squat	Bench press	Deadlift	Total weight	Total points
1st place, gold medalist(s)	Chen Wei-ling	Chinese Taipei	46.75	207.5 WR	92.5	195.0 WR	732.5	668.27
2nd place, silver medalist(s)	Yukako Fukushima	Japan	47.15	182.5	125.0	162.5	470.0	630.65
3rd place, bronze medalist(s)	Sri Hartati	Indonesia	51.40	197.5	117.5	185.0	500.0	628.90
4	Chou Yi-ju	Chinese Taipei	50.45	187.5	87.5	202.5 WR	477.5	609.27
5	Raija Jurkko	Finland	45.90	175.0	90.0	152.5	417.5	571.06
6	Kateryna Klymenko	Ukraine	51.70	175.0	115.0	160.0	450.0	563.49
7	Suzanne Hartwig-Gary	United States	51.45	170.0	97.5	165.0	432.5	543.61
8	Benedicte Lepanse	France	49.00	155.0	100.0	152.5	407.5	531.50
9	Mervi Sirkiä	Finland	51.70	150.0	90.0	155.0	395.0	494.62
	Vilma Ochoa	Ecuador	51.70	195.0	97.5	NM	DSQ	DSQ
