= Karate at the 2005 World Games – Men's kumite 80 kg =

Men's kumite 80 kg at the 2005 World Games
- Venue: Kfraftzentrale
- Date: 23 July 2005
- Competitors: 8 from 7 nations

Medalists
1st place, gold medalist(s)		(Russia) Islamutdin Eldaruchev
2nd place, silver medalist(s)		(Italy) Salvatore Loria
3rd place, bronze medalist(s)		(Canada) Philippe Poirier

The men's kumite 80 kg competition in karate at the 2005 World Games took place on 23 July 2005 at the Kfraftzentrale in Duisburg, Germany.

== Competition format ==
A total of 8 athletes entered the competition. In elimination round they fought in two groups. From this stage the best two athletes qualifies to the semifinals.

== Results ==
=== Elimination round ===
==== Group A ====
Rank	Athlete	B	W	D	L	Pts	Score
1	Islamutdin Eldaruchev (RUS)	3	3	0	0	6	14–5
2	Salvatore Loria (ITA)	3	2	0	1	4	12–8
3	Zeynel Çelik (TUR)	3	1	0	2	2	7–9
4	Viktor Löwenstein (GER)	3	0	0	3	0	4–15

	Score	
Islamutdin Eldaruchev (RUS)	7–2	Viktor Löwenstein (GER)
Salvatore Loria (ITA)	5–3	Zeynel Çelik (TUR)
Islamutdin Eldaruchev (RUS)	5–3	Salvatore Loria (ITA)
Viktor Löwenstein (GER)	2–4	Zeynel Çelik (TUR)
Islamutdin Eldaruchev (RUS)	2–0	Zeynel Çelik (TUR)
Viktor Löwenstein (GER)	0–4	Salvatore Loria (ITA)

==== Group B ====
Rank	Athlete	B	W	D	L	Pts	Score
1	Lukas Grezella (GER)	3	2	1	0	5	8–1
2	Philippe Poirier (CAN)	3	1	1	1	3	7–8
3	Ahmad Mohammad (KUW)	3	0	2	1	2	5–8
4	Tyron Edwards (NZL)	3	0	2	1	2	2–5

	Score	
Lukas Grezella (GER)	4–0	Philippe Poirier (CAN)
Tyron Edwards (NZL)	1–1	Ahmad Mohammad (KUW)
Lukas Grezella (GER)	0–0	Tyron Edwards (NZL)
Philippe Poirier (CAN)	3–3	Ahmad Mohammad (KUW)
Lukas Grezella (GER)	4–1	Ahmad Mohammad (KUW)
Philippe Poirier (CAN)	4–1	Tyron Edwards (NZL)

=== Finals ===
Semifinals
Islamutdin Eldaruchev (RUS)	9
Philippe Poirier (CAN)	2
Lukas Grezella (GER)	1
Salvatore Loria (ITA)	2

Final
Islamutdin Eldaruchev (RUS)	3
Salvatore Loria (ITA)	0
Third place
Philippe Poirier (CAN)	6
Lukas Grezella (GER)	4
