= Bodybuilding at the 2005 World Games – Women's 52 kg =

Bodybuilding women's 52 kg at the World Games
- Venue: TAM Theatre, Duisburg, Germany
- Date: 16–17 July 2005
- Competitors: 4 from 4 nations

Medalists
1st place, gold medalist(s)		Iryna Petrenko	Ukraine
2nd place, silver medalist(s)		Lo Kit Ming	Hong Kong
3rd place, bronze medalist(s)		Cao Xinli	China

The women's 52 kg event in bodybuilding at the 2005 World Games in Duisburg was played from 16 to 17 July. The bodybuilding competition took place in TAM Theatre.

== Competition format ==
A total of 4 athletes entered the competition. All of them advanced to the final rounds. Scores from round 1 doesn't count in final rounds.

== Results ==
Rank	Athlete	Nation	Round 1	Round 2	Round 3	Score
1st place, gold medalist(s)	Iryna Petrenko	Ukraine	7	7	8	15
2nd place, silver medalist(s)	Lo Kit Ming	Hong Kong	9	9	9	18
3rd place, bronze medalist(s)	Cao Xinli	China	14	15	14	29
4	Ilka Schwengl	Austria	20	19	18	37
