= Sport climbing at the 2005 World Games – Women's speed =

Sport climbing - Women's Speed at the 2005 World Games
- Venue: Landschaftspark Duisburg-Nord, Duisburg, Germany
- Dates: 22 July 2005
- Competitors: 8 from 6 nations

Medalists
| gold medal | (Russia) Anna Saulevich |
| silver medal | (Ukraine) Olena Ryepko |
| bronze medal | (Russia) Tatiana Ruyga |

The women's speed competition in sport climbing at the 2005 World Games took place on 22 July 2005 at the Landschaftspark Duisburg-Nord in Duisburg, Germany.

== Competition format ==
A total of 8 athletes entered the competition. After preliminary round they compete in the elimination system, in which they had to go 2 routes and their times were cumulated.

== Results ==
=== Preliminary round ===
| Rank | Athlete | Nation | Time |
|---|---|---|---|
| 1 | Olena Ryepko | Ukraine | 31.52 |
| 2 | Valentina Yurina | Russia | 32.29 |
| 3 | Anna Saulevich | Russia | 33.54 |
| 4 | Tatiana Ruyga | Russia | 34.95 |
| 5 | Alex Johnson | United States | 36.71 |
| 6 | Lucelia Blanco | Venezuela | 38.66 |
| 7 | Lisa Knoche | Germany | 39.65 |
| 8 | Evi Neliwati | Indonesia | 40.72 |

=== Competition bracket ===
Quarter-finals
1 | (Ukraine) Olena Ryepko | 31.76
8 | (Indonesia) Evi Neliwati | 39.98
4 | (Russia) Tatiana Ruyga | 35.41
5 | (United States) Alex Johnson | 36.49
2 | (Russia) Valentina Yurina | 33.65
7 | (Germany) Lisa Knoche | 36.63
3 | (Russia) Anna Saulevich | 31.78
6 | (Venezuela) Lucelia Blanco | 67.01

Semi-finals
1 | (Ukraine) Olena Ryepko | 30.66
4 | (Russia) Tatiana Ruyga | DNF
2 | (Russia) Valentina Yurina | 30.17
3 | (Russia) Anna Saulevich | 30.16

Finals
1 | (Ukraine) Olena Ryepko | 28.80
3 | (Russia) Anna Saulevich | 27.46
Third place
4 | (Russia) Tatiana Ruyga | 32.71
2 | (Russia) Valentina Yurina | 33.93
