= Bowling at the 2005 World Games – Men's nine-pin singles =

Bowling men's nine-pin singles at the 2005 World Games
- Venue: Sporthalle Krefelder Straße, Duisburg, Germany
- Date: 15–16 July 2005
- Competitors: 10 from 10 nations

Medalists
gold medal	(Luxembourg) Steve Blasen
silver medal	(Netherlands) Guus Maes
bronze medal	(Brazil) Bernardo Ramalho

The men's nine-pin singles event in bowling at the 2005 World Games took place from 15 to 16 July 2005 at the Sporthalle Krefelder Straße in Duisburg, Germany.

== Competition format ==
A total of 10 athletes entered the competition. Best eight athletes from preliminary round qualifies to the semifinal. From semifinal the best four athletes qualifies to the final.

== Results ==
=== Preliminary ===
Rank	Athlete	Nation	Result	Note
1	Steve Blasen	Luxembourg	839	Q
2	Holger Mayer	Germany	824	Q
3	Christian Marx	France	822	Q
4	Guus Maes	Netherlands	819	Q
5	Anton Bošnjak	Croatia	785	Q
6	Bernardo Ramalho	Brazil	774	Q
7	Claudy Michel	Belgium	756	Q
8	Mauro Arceci	Italy	743	Q
9	Cristian Zampicinini	Argentina	718	
10	Emir Cabrić	Bosnia and Herzegovina	702	

=== Semifinal ===
Rank	Athlete	Nation	Result	Note
1	Holger Mayer	Germany	839	Q
2	Steve Blasen	Luxembourg	832	Q
3	Guus Maes	Netherlands	805	Q
4	Bernardo Ramalho	Brazil	798	Q
5	Claudy Michel	Belgium	794	
6	Anton Bošnjak	Croatia	780	
7	Christian Marx	France	772	
8	Mauro Arceci	Italy	757	

=== Final ===
Rank	Athlete	Nation	Result
1st place, gold medalist(s)	Steve Blasen	Luxembourg	829
2nd place, silver medalist(s)	Guus Maes	Netherlands	807
3rd place, bronze medalist(s)	Bernardo Ramalho	Brazil	779
4	Holger Mayer	Germany	777
