= Boules sports at the 2001 World Games – Women's pétanque doubles =

Boules - women's pétanque doubles at the World Games
- Venue: World Games Plaza, Akita, Japan
- Date: 17–19 August 2001
- Competitors: 12 from 6 nations

Medalists
1st place, gold medalist(s)		Nancy Barzin; Linda Goblet	Belgium
2nd place, silver medalist(s)		Inés Rosario; María Luisa Ruíz	Spain
3rd place, bronze medalist(s)		Hanta Randriambahiny; Odile Razanamahefa	Madagascar

The women's pétanque doubles event in boules sports at the 2001 World Games took place from 17 to 19 August 2001 at the World Games Plaza in Akita, Japan.

== Competition format ==
A total of 6 teams entered the competition. In preliminary round they played round-robin tournament. From this stage the best four pairs advanced to the semifinals.

== Results ==
=== Preliminary ===
Rank	Team	Country	M	W	L	Pts	+/–
1	Inés Rosario; María Luisa Ruíz	Spain	5	5	0	65–23	+42
2	Nancy Barzin; Linda Goblet	Belgium	5	3	2	57–34	+23
3	Hanta Randriambahiny; Odile Razanamahefa	Madagascar	5	3	2	48–47	+1
4	Machiko Inoue; Fumie Kakiuchi	Japan	5	2	3	30–61	–31
5	Lene Kaaberbøl; Tine Hansen	Denmark	5	2	3	50–57	–7
6	Maryse Bergeron; Violette Robert	Canada	5	0	5	37–65	–28

	Score	
Belgium	10–13	Denmark
Spain	13–8	Madagascar
Canada	10–13	Japan
Madagascar	13–8	Japan
Belgium	8–13	Spain
Denmark	12–13	Japan
Belgium	13–1	Madagascar
Denmark	13–8	Canada
Spain	13–0	Japan
Denmark	3–13	Spain
Belgium	13–7	Canada
Madagascar	13–4	Japan
Spain	13–4	Canada
Denmark	9–13	Madagascar
Belgium	13–0	Japan

=== Finals ===
Semifinals
1	Spain	13
4	Japan	8
2	Belgium	13
3	Madagascar	9

Final
1	Spain	7
2	Belgium	13
Third place
4	Japan	5
3	Madagascar	13
