= Bowling at the 2005 World Games – Women's nine-pin singles =

2005 World Games Bowling

Bowling women's nine-pin singles at the 2005 World Games
- Venue: Sporthalle Krefelder Straße, Duisburg, Germany
- Date: 15-16 July 2005
- Competitors: 10 from 10 nations

Medalists
gold medal	(Germany) Elgin Justen
silver medal	(Belgium) Petra Comoth
bronze medal	(Luxembourg) Marceline Della Modesta

The women's nine-pin singles event in bowling at the 2005 World Games took place from 15 to 16 July 2005, at the Sporthalle Krefelder Straße in Duisburg, Germany.

== Competition format ==
A total of 10 athletes entered the competition. Best eight athletes from preliminary round qualifies to the semifinal. From semifinal the best four athletes qualifies to the final.

== Results ==
=== Preliminary ===
Rank	Athlete	Nation	Result	Note
1	Elgin Justen	Germany	829	Q
2	Maria Berends	Netherlands	770	Q
3	Petra Comoth	Belgium	760	Q
4	Meli Galić	Croatia	743	Q
5	Marceline Della Modesta	Luxembourg	735	Q
6	Sueli Huebes	Brazil	726	Q
7	Rosella Ruggiero-Arceci	Italy	726	Q
8	Irena Voss	Bosnia and Herzegovina	720	Q
9	Claudine Bonaddio	France	705	
10	Katica Schöngen	Serbia and Montenegro	703	

=== Semifinal ===
Rank	Athlete	Nation	Result	Note
1	Elgin Justen	Germany	857	Q
2	Marceline Della Modesta	Luxembourg	771	Q
3	Meli Galić	Croatia	758	Q
4	Petra Comoth	Belgium	752	Q
5	Irena Voss	Bosnia and Herzegovina	742	
6	Maria Berends	Netherlands	741	
7	Sueli Huebes	Brazil	738	
8	Rosella Ruggiero-Arceci	Italy	701	

=== Final ===
Rank	Athlete	Nation	Result
1st place, gold medalist(s)	Elgin Justen	Germany	827
2nd place, silver medalist(s)	Petra Comoth	Belgium	746
3rd place, bronze medalist(s)	Marceline Della Modesta	Luxembourg	712
4	Meli Galić	Croatia	708
