= Water skiing at the 2005 World Games – Men's three event =

Waterskiing men's three event at the 2005 World Games
- Venue: Sportpark Wedau, Regattabahn, Duisburg, Germany
- Date: 20–23 July 2005
- Competitors: 17 from 16 nations

Medalists
gold medal	(United Kingdom) Ryan Green
silver medal	(Chile) Rodrigo Miranda
bronze medal	(Belarus) Oleg Deviatovski

The men's three event competition in water skiing at the 2005 World Games took place from 20 to 23 July 2005 at the Sportpark Wedau, Regattabahn in Duisburg, Germany.

== Competition format ==
A total of 17 athletes entered the competition. In this competition athletes compete in three events: slalom, tricks and jump. Best ten athletes from preliminary round qualifies to the final.

== Results ==
=== Preliminary ===
Rank	Athlete	Nation	Slalom	Trick	Jump	Overall	Note
1	Ryan Green	(United Kingdom) Great Britain	879.31	1000.00	1000.00	2879.31	Q
2	Rodrigo Miranda	Chile	905.17	968.29	888.20	2761.66	Q
3	Damien Ackerer	France	862.07	924.12	838.51	2624.70	Q
4	Kyle Eade	New Zealand	887.93	670.44	1000.00	2558.37	Q
5	Nick Böttcher	Germany	1000.00	460.93	947.20	2408.13	Q
6	Andreas Leonhardt	Germany	905.17	775.76	720.50	2401.43	Q
7	Charles Blakley	United States	887.93	565.12	885.09	2338.14	Q
8	Oleg Deviatovski	Belarus	732.76	761.04	723.60	2217.40	Q
9	Jaime Dias de Freitas	Portugal	982.76	442.81	655.28	2080.85	Q
10	Kole Magnowski	Canada	896.55	181.20	835.40	1913.15	Q
11	Gabriele Falcioni	Italy	793.10	334.09	745.34	1872.53	
12	Arturo Torres	Mexico	801.72	494.90	546.58	1843.20	
13	Genadi Guralia	(Georgia (country)) Georgia	887.93	104.19	829.19	1821.31	
14	Martin Bartalsky	Slovakia	870.69	272.93	562.11	1705.73	
15	Adam Sedlmajer	Czech Republic	43.10	816.53	801.24	1660.87	
16	Hiroyuki Kurisawa	Japan	905.17	50.96	636.65	1592.78	
17	George Hatzis	Greece	68.97	558.32	835.40	1462.69	

=== Final ===
Rank	Athlete	Nation	Slalom	Trick	Jump	Overall
1st place, gold medalist(s)	Ryan Green	(United Kingdom) Great Britain	949.58	958.21	1000.00	2907.79
2nd place, silver medalist(s)	Rodrigo Miranda	Chile	890.76	871.72	963.19	2725.67
3rd place, bronze medalist(s)	Oleg Deviatovski	Belarus	815.13	1000.00	901.84	2716.97
4	Damien Ackerer	France	890.76	849.37	935.58	2675.71
5	Kyle Eade	New Zealand	945.38	625.85	981.60	2552.83
6	Charles Blakley	United States	798.32	633.62	834.36	2266.30
7	Nick Böttcher	Germany	1000.00	439.26	809.82	2249.08
8	Andreas Leonhardt	Germany	865.55	557.82	803.68	2227.05
9	Jaime Dias de Freitas	Portugal	941.18	462.59	776.07	2179.84
10	Kole Magnowski	Canada	941.18	58.31	938.65	1938.14
