= Bowling at the 2005 World Games – Mixed nine-pin doubles =

Bowling mixed nine-pin doubles at the World Games
- Venue: Sporthalle Krefelder Straße
- Date: 15–16 July 2005
- Competitors: 16 from 8 nations

Medalists
1st place, gold medalist(s)		Holger Mayer; Elgin Justen
2nd place, silver medalist(s)		Steve Blasen; Marceline Della Modesta
3rd place, bronze medalist(s)		Guus Maes; Marjon Berends

The mixed nine-pin doubles event in bowling at the 2005 World Games took place from 15 to 16 July 2005 at the Sporthalle Krefelder Straße in Duisburg, Germany.

== Competition format ==
A total of 8 pairs entered the competition. Best four duets from preliminary round qualifies to the final.

== Results ==
=== Preliminary ===
Rank	Athletes	Nation	Result	Note
1	Holger Mayer; Elgin Justen	Germany	650	Q
2	Steve Blasen; Marceline Della Modesta	Luxembourg	642	Q
3	Guus Maes; Marjon Berends	Netherlands	632	Q
4	Bernardo Ramalho; Sueli Huebes	Brazil	598	Q
5	Claudy Michel; Petra Comoth	Belgium	582	
6	Emir Cabrić; Irena Voss	Bosnia and Herzegovina	568	
7	Christian Marx; Claudine Bonaddio	France	567	
8	Mauro Arceci; Rosella Ruggiero-Arceci	Italy	546	

=== Final ===
Rank	Athletes	Nation	Result
1st place, gold medalist(s)	Holger Mayer; Elgin Justen	Germany	692
2nd place, silver medalist(s)	Steve Blasen; Marceline Della Modesta	Luxembourg	659
3rd place, bronze medalist(s)	Guus Maes; Marjon Berends	Netherlands	636
4	Bernardo Ramalho; Sueli Huebes	Brazil	612
