= Ju-jitsu at the 2005 World Games - Men's fighting - 69 kg =

Ju-jitsu men's fighting −69 kg at the 2005 World Games
- Venue: Landschaftspark Nord, Kraftzentrale, Duisburg, Germany
- Dates: 21 July 2005
- Competitors: 8 from 8 nations

Medalists
| gold medal | (Denmark) Christian Mattle |
| silver medal | (Netherlands) Ferry Hendriks |
| bronze medal | (Germany) Marco Dünzl |

The men's fighting −69 kg competition in ju-jitsu at the 2005 World Games took place on 21 July 2005 at the Kraftzentrale in Duisburg, Germany.

== Competition format ==
A total of 8 athletes entered the competition. They fought in stepladder system.

== Results ==
=== Gold medal bracket ===
Quarterfinals
Ferry Hendriks (NED) | W
Marco Dünzel (GER) | L
Christian N'Doumbe (FRA) | L
Michał Adamczyk (POL) | W
Marco Baratti (ITA) | L
Christian Mattle (DEN) | W
Daniel Gasco Jimenez (ESP) | W
Fedor Serov (RUS) | L

Semifinals
Ferry Hendriks (NED) | W
Michał Adamczyk (POL) | L
Christian Mattle (DEN) | W
Daniel Gasco Jimenez (ESP) | L

Final
Ferry Hendriks (NED) | L
Christian Mattle (DEN) | W

=== Bronze medal bracket ===
Quarterfinals
Marco Dünzel (GER) | W
Christian N'Doumbe (FRA) | L
Marco Baratti (ITA) | L
Fedor Serov (RUS) | W

Semifinals
Marco Dünzel (GER) | W
Daniel Gasco Jimenez (ESP) | L
Fedor Serov (RUS) | W
Michał Adamczyk (POL) | L

Final
Marco Dünzel (GER) | W
Fedor Serov (RUS) | L
