= Ju-jitsu at the 2005 World Games - Men's fighting - 85 kg =

Ju-jitsu men's fighting −85 kg at the 2005 World Games
- Venue: Landschaftspark Nord, Kraftzentrale, Duisburg, Germany
- Dates: 21 July 2005
- Competitors: 8 from 7 nations

Medalists
gold medal	(France) Guilaume Piquet
silver medal	(Germany) Markus Buchholz
bronze medal	(Spain) David Amores

The men's fighting −85 kg competition in ju-jitsu at the 2005 World Games took place on 21 July 2005 at the Kraftzentrale in Duisburg, Germany.

== Competition format ==
A total of 8 athletes entered the competition. They fought in stepladder system.

== Results ==
=== Gold medal bracket ===
Quarterfinals
Gertjan Hofland (NED)	W
David Amores (ESP)	L
Gregory Vallarino Pereira (URU)	L
Guilaume Piquet (FRA)	W
Carsten Ettrup (DEN)	W
Marcus Abler (SWE)	L
Markus Buchholz (GER)	W
Bernd Breuer (GER)	L

Semifinals
Gertjan Hofland (NED)	L
Guilaume Piquet (FRA)	W
Carsten Ettrup (DEN)	L
Markus Buchholz (GER)	W

Final
Guilaume Piquet (FRA)	W
Markus Buchholz (GER)	L

=== Bronze medal bracket ===
Semifinals		Final
David Amores (ESP)	W
Carsten Ettrup (DEN)	L	David Amores (ESP)	W
Marcus Abler (SWE)	W	Marcus Abler (SWE)	L
Gertjan Hofland (NED)	L
