= Field archery at the 2005 World Games – Men's barebow =

Field archery men's barebow at the 2005 World Games
- Venue: Mülheimer Wald und MüGa-Gelände, Duisburg, Germany
- Dates: 15–17 July 2005
- Competitors: 11 from 8 nations

Medalists
gold medal	(Sweden) Erik Jonsson
silver medal	(Italy) Mario Orlandi
bronze medal	(Sweden) Mathias Larsson

The men's barebow archery competition at the 2005 World Games took place from 15 to 17 July 2005 at the Mülheimer Wald und MüGa-Gelände in Duisburg, Germany.

== Competition format ==
A total of 11 archers entered the competition. The best four athletes from preliminary round qualifies to the semifinals.

== Results ==
=== Preliminary round ===
Rank	Archer	Nation	Score	Note
1	Erik Jonsson	Sweden	673	Q
2	Mathias Larsson	Sweden	658	Q
3	Mario Orlandi	Italy	634	Q
4	Sergio Massimo Cassiani	Italy	632*	Q
5	Karl-Heinz Clauter	Germany	632	
6	Peter Mulligan	(United Kingdom) Great Britain	630	
7	Christophe Clement	France	624	
8	Ernst Crome	Germany	607	
9	Žare Krajnc	Slovenia	606	
10	Jari Onatsu	Finland	589	
11	Amritpal Singh	Kenya	307	

=== Finals ===
Semifinals
1	(Sweden) Erik Jonsson	50
4	(Italy) Sergio Massimo Cassiani	43
2	(Sweden) Mathias Larsson	49
3	(Italy) Mario Orlandi	49*

Finals
1	(Sweden) Erik Jonsson	51
3	(Italy) Mario Orlandi	49
Third place
4	(Italy) Sergio Massimo Cassiani	49
2	(Sweden) Mathias Larsson	52
