= Boules sports at the 2001 World Games – Men's pétanque triples =

Boules - men's pétanque triples at the World Games
- Venue: World Games Plaza, Akita, Japan
- Date: 17–19 August 2001
- Competitors: 18 from 6 nations

Medalists
1st place, gold medalist(s)		Stefano Bruno; Fabio Dutto; Paolo Lerda	Italy
2nd place, silver medalist(s)		José Luis Delgado; José Joaquín Romero; Antonio López	Spain
3rd place, bronze medalist(s)		André Lozano; Michel Van Campenhout; Claudy Weibel	Belgium

The men's pétanque triples event in boules sports at the 2001 World Games took place from 17 to 19 August 2001 at the World Games Plaza in Akita, Japan.

== Competition format ==
A total of 6 teams entered the competition. In preliminary round they played round-robin tournament. From this stage the best four pairs advanced to the semifinals.

== Results ==
=== Preliminary ===
Rank	Team	Country	M	W	L	Pts	+/–
1	Stefano Bruno; Fabio Dutto; Paolo Lerda	Italy	5	5	0	65–39	+26
2	André Lozano; Michel Van Campenhout; Claudy Weibel	Belgium	5	3	2	55–35	+20
3	José Luis Delgado; José Joaquín Romero; Antonio López	Spain	5	3	2	53–39	+14
4	Damien Hureau; David Le Dantec; Raphaël Rypen	France	5	3	2	48–42	+6
5	Kazuya Inoe; Katsuyuki Kaneko; Hiroyuki Konari	Japan	5	1	4	26–64	–38
6	Nabil El Bey; Chokri Gharbi; Allala Jendoubi	Tunisia	5	0	5	37–65	–28

	Score	
Belgium	13–2	Tunisia
France	4–13	Italy
Spain	13–0	Japan
Italy	13–10	Spain
Belgium	6–13	France
Tunisia	12–13	Japan
Belgium	10–13	Italy
Tunisia	8–13	Spain
France	13–4	Japan
Tunisia	6–13	France
Belgium	13–4	Spain
Italy	13–6	Japan
France	5–13	Spain
Tunisia	9–13	Italy
Belgium	13–3	Japan

=== Finals ===
Semifinals
1	Italy	13
4	France	12
2	Belgium	12
3	Spain	13

Final
1	Italy	13
3	Spain	5
Third place
4	France	3
2	Belgium	13
