= Parachuting at the 2005 World Games =

Air sports at the 2009 World Games
- Venue: Toeppersee Nordufer Duisburg
- Dates: 15–17 July 2005
- Competitors: from 19 nations

The parachuting tournaments in air sports at the 2005 World Games in Duisburg was played between 15 and 17 July. Parachuters from 19 nations, participated in the tournament. The parachuting competition took place in Toeppersee Nordufer Duisburg.

== Participating nations ==
- Australia
- Austria
- Belgium
- Canada
- Chinese Taipei
- Croatia
- Czech Republic
- Denmark
- France
- Germany
- Hungary
- Italy
- Japan
- Russia
- Switzerland
- Turkey
- Ukraine
- United States
- Venezuela

== Medal table ==
Rank	Nation	Gold	Silver	Bronze	Total
1	United States	1	1	2	4
2	France	1	1	0	2
3	Canada	1	0	0	1
3	Denmark	1	0	0	1
3	Hungary	1	0	0	1
6	Germany	0	2	0	2
7	Russia	0	1	0	1
8	Italy	0	0	1	1
8	Japan	0	0	1	1
8	Turkey	0	0	1	1
Totals (10 entries)		5	5	5	15

== Events ==
Event	Gold	Silver	Bronze
Parachuting accuracy landing	István Asztalos; Hungary	Stefan Wiesner; Germany	Savaş Koçyiğit; Turkey
Canopy piloting	Jay Moledzki; Canada	Shannon Pilcher; United States	Clint Clawson; United States
Freestyle skydiving	Denmark; Nils Predstrup; Martin Kristensen	France; Robin Dubuisson; Nicolas Arnaud	Japan; Yoko Okazaki; Axel Zohmann
Freeflying	France; Stéphane Fardel; Frédéric Fugen; Vincent Reffet	Germany; Hartmut Neumann; Michael Plünnecke; Frank Täsler	United States; Trent Alkek; Stephen Boyd; Jed Lloyd
Formation skydiving	United States; Shannon Pilcher; Doug Park; Jonathan Tagle; Solly Williams	Russia; Vasily Korotkov; Alexander Kvochur; Alexey Minaev; Vadim Niyazov; Evgeny Stashchenko	Italy; Marco Arrigo; Arianna De Benedetti; Luca Marchioro; Livio Piccolo; Luca Poretti
