= Dragon boat at the 2005 World Games =

- Venue: Duisburg, Germany
- Dates: 17–18 July 2005
- Competitors: from 12 nations

The dragon boat events at the 2005 World Games in Duisburg were held between 17 and 18 July as a demonstration sport. Athletes from 12 nations competed.

== Participating nations ==
- Czech Republic
- France
- Germany (2 teams)
- Hungary
- Italy
- Poland
- Russia
- Spain
- Switzerland
- Sweden
- Chinese Taipei
- Ukraine

== Medal table ==
* Host nation (Germany)

Rank	Nation	Gold	Silver	Bronze	Total
1	Russia	2	1	1	4
2	Germany*	1	1	2	4
3	Czech Republic	1	0	0	1
4	Switzerland	0	2	0	2
5	Sweden	0	0	1	1
Totals (5 entries)		4	4	4	12

== Events ==
Event	Gold	Silver	Bronze
200 m	Russia	Switzerland	Germany
500 m	Russia	Switzerland	Germany
1000 m	Czech Republic	Germany	Russia
2000 m	Germany	Russia	Sweden
