= Sri Hartati =

Indonesian powerlifter

Personal information
- Born: 8 November 1984 (age 41) Pringsewu, Lampung, Indonesia

Sport
- Country: Indonesia
- Sport: Powerlifting
Medal record
Women's powerlifting
Representing Indonesia
World Games
Bronze medal – third place	2009 Kaohsiung	Lightweight
World Championships
Gold medal – first place	2010 Potchefstroom	52 kg
Gold medal – first place	2012 Aguadilla	57 kg
Gold medal – first place	2013 Stavanger	57 kg
Gold medal – first place	2015 Hamm	57 kg
Gold medal – first place	2016 Orlando	57 kg
Gold medal – first place	2018 Halmstad	57 kg
Gold medal – first place	2019 Dubai	57 kg
Silver medal – second place	2008 St. Johns	52 kg
Asia-Oceania Championships
Gold medal – first place	2014 Melbourne	57 kg
Asian Championships
Gold medal – first place	2007 Kaohsiung	52 kg
Gold medal – first place	2011 Kobe	57 kg
Gold medal – first place	2018 Udaipur	57 kg

Sri Hartati (born 8 November 1984) is an Indonesian powerlifter. She won seven gold medals at the World Championships. In 2018, she broke the world record. The record that Sri Hartati made was a total lift of 565 kg.

== Career ==
Sri Hartati started her career by training at the Padepokan Gajah Lampung, this is a place for powerlifting and weightlifting athletes who will compete in national and international championships.
