= Sinclair coefficient =

Method to compare weigh classes in Olympic weightlifting

The Sinclair Coefficients are a method to compare different weight classes in Olympic weightlifting. It replaced Hoffman's formula, which was the first statistical analysis of this type.

The method provides the answer to the question "What would be the total of an athlete weighing x kg if he/she were an athlete in the heaviest class of the same level of ability?", given by the formula: ACTUAL TOTAL × SINCLAIR COEFFICIENT = SINCLAIR TOTAL.

Since 1 November 2018, there are ten bodyweight categories for each gender. For men, they are 55 kg, 61 kg, 67 kg, 73 kg, 81 kg, 89 kg, 96 kg, 102 kg, 109 kg, and +109 kg, and for women: 45 kg, 49 kg, 55 kg, 59 kg, 64 kg, 71 kg, 76 kg, 81 kg, 87 kg and +87 kg.

There are two types of lifts: snatch, and clean and jerk. However, at most championships, medals are presented for both lifts and the total (the combined result of the best snatch and the best clean and jerk).

To compare and rank the results, especially between bodyweight categories, the International Weightlifting Federation uses the Sinclair Coefficients which are derived statistically and calculated for one Olympic cycle (for four years, starting in the Spring of each Olympic year).

The total for each bodyweight category is a projection of the Total for that weightlifter if he/she were a competitor in the heaviest bodyweight category with the same level of ability.

The Sinclair Coefficient is $10^{A({\log_{10}{(x/b)}})^2}$ if x<b where x is the weightlifter's bodyweight, b is the world record holder's bodyweight (in the heaviest category) and A is the coefficient for this Olympic cycle, or 1.0 if x ≥ b.

Then, the Sinclair Total is simply the obtained total multiplied by the Sinclair Coefficient.

For example, from 2017 to 2020, a calculation of the Sinclair Coefficient is as follows given A=0.751945030 and b=175.508 kg for men and A=0.783497476 and b=153.655 kg for women.

Assume that we are assessing a male weightlifter weighing 61.9 kg with a total of 320 kg.

Then, x = 61.9 kg, and we have
X = log10(x/b) = log10(61.9/175.508) = −0.4526062683
A(X^2) = 0.751945030 × (-0.4526062683) ^ 2 = 0.751945030 × 0.204852431 = 0.1540377697
10^(A(X^2)) = 10^0.1540377697 = 1.4257315812

Sinclair Total = Actual Total × S.C. = 320 kg × 1.4257315812 = 456.234

== Men's Sinclair chart ==
To understand the whole idea, here is the chart with the men's bodyweight categories (in kg) and their world record Totals, Sinclair Coefficients, and Sinclair Total. By looking at the Sinclair Total, we can determine the RANK.

#	Weight Class (kg)	World Record (kg)	Sinclair Coefficient	Sinclair Total	Rank
1	55	293	1.552231	454.803	8
2	61	318	1.440117	457.952	7
3	67	339	1.353700	458.904	6
4	73	363	1.285695	466.707	4
5	81	378	1.215696	459.533	5
6	89	387	1.162510	449.891	10
7	96	416	1.126229	468.511	2
8	102	412	1.100963	453.597	9
9	109	435	1.076911	468.456	3
10	+109	484	1	484	1

== Women's Sinclair chart ==
#	Weight Class (kg)	World Record (kg)	Sinclair Coefficient	Sinclair Total	Rank
1	45	191	1.670561	319.077	10
2	49	212	1.573211	333.521	3
3	55	227	1.432118	325.090	9
4	59	246	1.365809	335.990	2
5	64	261	1.298241	338.841	1
6	71	267	1.224840	327.032	7
7	76	278	1.183684	329.064	5
8	81	283	1.149684	325.361	8
9	87	294	1.116377	328.214	6
10	+87	332	1	332	5

== Notable Sinclair Totals throughout the history of modern weightlifting ==
=== Men ===
The highest men's Sinclair Total was set by Naim Süleymanoğlu at the 1988 Summer Olympics in Seoul, South Korea, with 500.705.

Yurik Vardanyan set a 490.823 Sinclair Total at the 1982 USSR Championships in Dnepropetrovsk, Soviet Union (now Ukraine).

Viktor Solodov set a 489.331 Sinclair Total at the 1984 Friendship Games in Varna, Bulgaria.

Yury Zakharevich set a 489.232 Sinclair Total at the 1988 Olympics in Seoul.

==== Individual lifts ====
The highest men's Sinclair Snatch is 226.156 set by Blagoy Blagoev in 1983 in Varna, Bulgaria.

The highest men's Sinclair Clean and Jerk is 277.763 set by Naim Süleymanoğlu at the 1988 Olympics in Seoul.

As of 2020, there are only four other men to have set a Sinclair Clean and Jerk of 272.159 (i.e. 600 pounds) or higher:

- Anatoly Pisarenko set a 273.546 Sinclair Clean and Jerk at the 1984 Friendship Games in Varna, Bulgaria.
- Aleksandar Varbanov set a 272.875 Sinclair Clean and Jerk at the 1987 World Cup in Seoul.
- Kakhi Kakhiashvili set a 272.851 Sinclair Clean and Jerk at the 1992 Olympic Games in Barcelona, Spain.
- Anatoly Khrapaty set a 272.582 Sinclair Clean and Jerk at the 1988 European Championships in Cardiff, Wales, United Kingdom.

=== Women ===
The highest women's Sinclair Total was set by Tatiana Kashirina at the 2014 World Championships in Almaty, Khazakstan, with 364.529.

Natalia Zabolotnaya set a Sinclair Total of 352.622 at the 2011 President's Cup in Belgorod, Russia.

Svetlana Podobedova set a Sinclair Total of 352.190 at the 2010 World Championships in Antanlya, Turkey.

Nadezhda Evstyukhina set a Sinclair Total of 350.940 at the 2011 World Championships in Paris, France.

==== Individual lifts ====
The highest women's Sinclair Snatch is 162.362, set by Tatiana Kashirina at the 2014 World Championships.

As of 2020, there are only two other women to have set a Sinclair Snatch of 158.757 (350 pounds) or higher:

- Natalia Zaboloynaya, who set a 160.824 Sinclair Snatch at the 2011 President's Cup.
- Svetlana Podobedova, who set a 159.978 Sinclair Snatch at the 2010 World Championships.

The highest women's Sinclair Clean and Jerk is 202.167, also set by Tatiana Kashirina at the 2014 World Championships. As of 2020, Kashirina is the only woman to set a Sinclair Clean and Jerk of 200 or higher.

== See also ==
- Wilks Coefficient
