= Fistball at the 2005 World Games =

- Venue: Sportschule Wedau
- Dates: 21-24 July 2005
- Competitors: 6 nations

Fistball was contested at the 2005 World Games in Duisburg, Germany from 21 July to 24 July 2005. The competition took place at Sportschule Wedau.

== Participating nations ==
- Argentina
- Austria
- Brazil
- Denmark
- Germany
- Switzerland

== Preliminary round ==
The preliminary round was played in a round-robin format.

Team	Pld	W	L	SW	SL	SD
Brazil	5	5	0	10	1	+9
Austria	5	4	1	8	2	+6
Switzerland	5	3	2	6	5	+1
Germany	5	2	3	5	7	–2
Argentina	5	1	4	4	9	–5
Denmark	5	0	5	1	10	–8

Date	Time		Score		Set 1	Set 2	Set 3	Total	Report
21 July	13:00	Brazil	2–0	Denmark	20–7	20–12		40–19	
21 July	14:15	Germany	2–1	Argentina	20–10	17–20	20–9	57–39	
21 July	15:30	Austria	2–0	Switzerland	20–4	20–13		40–17	
21 July	16:45	Germany	2–0	Denmark	20–8	20–16		40–24	
21 July	18:00	Austria	2–0	Argentina	20–13	20–16		40–29	
21 July	19:00	Brazil	2–0	Switzerland	20–12	20–12		40–24	
22 July	13:00	Switzerland	2–0	Argentina	21–19	20–10		41–29	
22 July	14:15	Austria	2–0	Denmark	20–5	20–10		40–15	
22 July	15:30	Brazil	2–0	Germany	20–14	20–15		40–29	
22 July	16:45	Argentina	2–1	Denmark	17–20	20–11	20–13	57–44	
22 July	18:00	Germany	1–2	Switzerland	20–18	13–20	4–20	37–58	
22 July	19:15	Brazil	2–0	Austria	20–11	21–19		41–30	
23 July	13:00	Brazil	2–1	Argentina	20–12	19–21	20–13	59–46	
23 July	14:15	Switzerland	2–0	Denmark	20–18	20–13		40–31	
23 July	15:30	Germany	0–2	Austria	12–20	19–21		31–41	

== Tournament ==
The tournament was held on 23 and 24 July.

=== Fifth-place match ===
Date	Time		Score		Set 1	Set 2	Set 3	Total	Report
23 July	16:45	Argentina	2–0	Denmark	20–10	20–15		40–25	

=== Semifinals ===
Date	Time		Score		Set 1	Set 2	Set 3	Total	Report
23 July	18:15	Brazil	2–0	Germany	20–12	20–16		40–28	
23 July	19:30	Austria	2–0	Switzerland	20–11	20–14		40–25	

=== Bronze medal match ===
Date	Time		Score		Set 1	Set 2	Set 3	Set 4	Set 5	Total
24 July	11:00	Germany	3–1	Switzerland	20–7	20–8	14–20	20–14		74–49

=== Final ===
Date	Time		Score		Set 1	Set 2	Set 3	Set 4	Set 5	Total
24 July	14:00	Brazil	2–3	Austria	11–20	20–14	20–15	17–20	21–23	89–92

== Final rankings ==
Rank	Team
Gold medal	Austria
Silver medal	Brazil
Bronze medal	Germany
4	Switzerland
5	Argentina
6	Denmark
