= Powerlifting Australia =

Australian sports governing body

- Sport: Powerlifting
- Jurisdiction: Australia
- Abbreviation: PA
- Founded: 1971
- Affiliation: Worldpowerlifting
- Affiliation date: N/A
- Headquarters: Queen Street, Melbourne, Victoria
- Chairman: Arron Dehlsen
- CEO: Robert Wilks
- Director: Arron Dehlsen, Piero Sacchetta, Brett Smartt, Robert Wilks
- Coach: Robert Wilks
- Sponsor: Samtek

Official website
- powerliftingaustralia.com
- (Australia)

Powerlifting Australia Ltd. is one of the many organisations in the sport of Powerlifting in Australia. As of 10 December 2017 the International Powerlifting Federation reported in their "Minutes of General Assembly Meeting" (PDF). to exclude Powerlifting Australia (PA), Oceania Powerlifting Federation (OPF) and Mr Robert Wilks from IPF and its activities

As Powerlifting Australia was removed from the IPF, two new powerlifting federations were formed in Australia during 2018, "Australian Powerlifting Union (APU)" and "Oceania Regional Powerlifting Federation (ORPF)" to represent lifters competing in the International Powerlifting Federation.

Competitions no longer follow the IPF Technical Rules in relation to approved equipment and weight classes.

== Structure ==
Membership of Powerlifting Australia comprises individual members, life members and patrons.

== The Board ==
The Board comprises up to five Directors with three Directors elected under Rule 33 and two Directors appointed by the first 3 Director. The Board appoints a chairman and deputy-Chairman with each holding a term of one year, but may be appointed. The chairman and deputy-chairman will each hold office for a term of one year but may be re-appointed. A chairman and deputy-chairman can only serve in those positions for a maximum of 6 years.

== Australia Competition Records ==
The Powerlifting Australia records represent the best male and female lifts by Powerlifting Australia members in PA competitions which were performed at regional level or higher level or where all three referees are of National Level or higher. Records performed in local Powerlifting Australia competitions are recognised based upon certain conditions being fulfilled. Powerlifting Australia must receive positive information suggesting that all three referees at the competition are at least National level referees.

== Sexual Harassment Allegations by Yingshi Qu aka Dori Qu aka Dori Deng, and Defamation Suit ==
Extract from the formal announcement from the board of PA:

BOARD REPORT RE CEO POSITION

In September 2021 the Board of Powerlifting Australia commissioned an independent investigation into a complaint concerning PA CEO Robert Wilks, that conducted as per PA's Member Protection Policy. The Investigation was carried out by former Victoria Police Senior Detective Rowland Legg. The investigation did not involve participation of the victim. Reporting on the matter was delayed by Victoria's lockdowns but the investigation is now complete. The investigator's conclusions were that the allegations made in the complaint were assessed and found as unable to be substantiated.

In light of those conclusions the Board of Powerlifting Australia determined to restore Mr Wilks to the position of CEO of Powerlifting Australia. The Board thanks Robert for his outstanding contributions to the sport of Powerlifting and look forward to the continuation of his good work.

The phrases used in the PA message are direct quotes from the conclusion section of the report. The investigation involved evidence from a number of witnesses, retrieved written material, photos and so on and the conclusions were as stated.

Student Athlete Yingshi Qu also known as Dori Qu also known as Dori Deng, lodged a sexual harassment complaint against her coach, Robert Wilks with Powerlifting Australia, for which he acts as CEO, alleging that Mr Wilks pressured Ms Qu into sexual encounters at her apartment. According to court documents, Ms Qu sent the email outlining her allegations on July 5, 2021, to two women on the Powerlifting Australia executive. Wilks has responded with a Defamation Suit.

On August 10, 2021, Wilks voluntarily stepped down as chief executive of Powerlifting Australia.

The Age published a lengthy article on 15 August 2021 pointing out two other legal cases initiated by Robert Wilks

== Frozen Records ==
At the end of 2010, the IPF changed weight class categories and Powerlifting Australia equipped records were frozen as a result. The records below represent what was achieved between 1991 and 2010:

- Men's Records (1992-2010)
- Women's Records (1992-2010)
- School's Bench Press Records (1992-2010)

== See also ==
- Women's powerlifting in Australia
