= Ju-jitsu at the 2005 World Games =

- Venue: Landschaftspark Nord, Kraftzentrale
- Dates: 21–22 July 2005

The Ju-jitsu competition at the World Games 2005 took place from July 21 to July 22, in Duisburg, Germany, at the Landschaftspark Nord, Kraftzentrale.

== Schedule ==
- 21.07.2005 – Men's and Women's Fighting System, Men's and Women's Duo System – Classic
- 22.07.2005 – Men's and Women's Fighting System, Mixed Duo System – Classic

== Events ==
=== Duo ===
Event	Gold	Silver	Bronze
Men	Switzerland; Pascal Müller; Remo Müller	Spain; Alexandre Barrero; Gil García	France; Laurent Beard; Julien Hellouin
Women	Germany; Nadin Altmüller; Stefanie Satory	Austria; Katharina Beisteiner; Eva Ehrlich	Belgium; Sandy Van Landeghem; Vanessa Van de Vijver
Mixed	Germany; Mathias Huber; Corinna Endele	Netherlands; Barry van Bommel; Silvia Alvarez	Switzerland; Andreas Zürcher; Marianne Schillinger

=== Men's fighting ===
Event	Gold	Silver	Bronze
−69 kg	Christian Mattle; Denmark	Ferry Hendriks; Netherlands	Marco Dünzl; Germany
−77 kg	Kenneth Thiim; Denmark	Mario Staller; Germany	Julien Boussuge; France
−85 kg	Guilaume Piquet; France	Markus Buchholz; Germany	David Amores; Spain
−94 kg	Fernando Segovia; Spain	Aleksey Veselovzorov; Russia	Vincent Parisi; France

=== Women's fighting ===
Event	Gold	Silver	Bronze
−55 kg	Jeanne Rasmussen; Denmark	Minerva Montero; Spain	Annabelle Reydy; France
−62 kg	Nicole Sydbøge; Denmark	Judith de Weerd; Netherlands	Marisol Harms; Germany
−70 kg	Sabine Felser; Germany	Aurora Fajardo; Spain	Lindsay Wyatt; Netherlands

== Links ==
=== External links ===
- Live results
- Official results (PDF)
