= Sport climbing at the 2005 World Games =

- Venue: Landschaftspark Nord
- Dates: 22–23 July 2005
- Competitors: 32 from 14 nations

Competition climbing at the 2005 World Games in Duisburg was played between 22 and 23 July. 32 athletes from 14 different nations participated in the tournament which included events in competition lead climbing and competition speed climbing. The competition took place in Landschaftspark Nord.

== Participating nations ==
- Australia (2)
- Austria (1)
- Belgium (1)
- Czech Republic (1)
- France (1)
- Germany (4)
- Indonesia (1)
- Russia (6)
- Slovenia (1)
- South Korea (3)
- Spain (2)
- Ukraine (1)
- United States (4)
- Venezuela (4)

== Medal table ==
Rank	Nation	Gold	Silver	Bronze	Total
1	Russia	2	1	2	5
2	Austria	1	0	0	1
2	Spain	1	0	0	1
4	Czech Republic	0	1	0	1
4	France	0	1	0	1
4	Slovenia	0	1	0	1
4	Ukraine	0	1	0	1
8	Germany	0	0	1	1
Totals (8 entries)		4	5	3	12

== Events ==
=== Men ===
Event	Gold	Silver	Bronze
Speed	Aleksandr Peshekhonov; Russia	Sergey Sinitsyn; Russia	Evgenii Vaitsekhovskii; Russia
Lead	Patxi Usobiaga; Spain	Tomáš Mrázek; Czech Republic; Alexandre Chabot; France	Shared silver

=== Women ===
Event	Gold	Silver	Bronze
Speed	Anna Saulevich; Russia	Olena Ryepko; Ukraine	Tatiana Ruyga; Russia
Lead	Angela Eiter; Austria	Natalija Gros; Slovenia	Marietta Uhden; Germany
