= Belgium at the World Games =

Sporting event delegation

Belgium has competed at most editions of the World Games after making its first appearance at the 1981 Games.

== List of medalists ==
=== Official sports ===
Medal	Name	Games	Sport	Event
Gold	Nora Haveneers; Dominique De Nolf	(United Kingdom) 1985 London	Bowling	Mixed ten-pin bowling
Silver	Korfball team	(United Kingdom) 1985 London	Korfball	Mixed event
Silver	Korfball team	(West Germany) 1989 Karlsruhe	Korfball	Mixed event
Silver	Korfball team	(Netherlands) 1993 The Hague	Korfball	Mixed event
Gold	Gery Verbruggen	(Finland) 1997 Lahti	Bowling	Men's ten-pin bowling
Silver	Korfball team	(Finland) 1997 Lahti	Korfball	Mixed event
Silver	Korfball team	(Japan) 2001 Akita	Korfball	Mixed event
Silver	Petra Comoth	(Germany) 2005 Duisburg	Bowling	Women's nine-pin bowling
Silver	Gery Verbruggen	(Germany) 2005 Duisburg	Bowling	Men's ten-pin bowling
Silver	Korfball team	(Germany) 2005 Duisburg	Korfball	Mixed event
Silver	Korfball team	(Taiwan) 2009 Kaohsiung	Korfball	Mixed event
Gold	Bart Swings	(Colombia) 2013 Cali	Inline road skating	Men's 20,000 metres (elimination)
Gold	Bart Swings	(Colombia) 2013 Cali	Inline speed skating	Men's 10,000 metres (point elimination)
Silver	Eddy Merckx	(Colombia) 2013 Cali	Billiard sports	Men's carom three cushion
Silver	Bart Swings	(Colombia) 2013 Cali	Inline speed skating	Men's 1,000 metres (sprint)
Silver	Korfball team	(Colombia) 2013 Cali	Korfball	Mixed event
Bronze	Bart Swings	(Colombia) 2013 Cali	Inline road skating	Men's 10,000 metres (point race)

=== Invitational sports ===
Medal	Name	Games	Sport	Event
Gold	Rob Woestenborghs	(Colombia) 2013 Cali	Duathlon	Men's event
