= Powerlifting at the 2005 World Games =

- Venue: Rheinhausenhalle
- Dates: 16–17 July 2005
- Competitors: 67 from 24 nations

The powerlifting events at the 2005 World Games in Duisburg was played between 16 and 17 July. 67 athletes, from 24 nations, participated in the tournament. The powerlifting competition took place in Rheinhausenhalle.

== Participating nations ==
- Belgium (1)
- Brazil (1)
- Canada (1)
- Chinese Taipei (5)
- Czech Republic (1)
- Finland (4)
- France (3)
- Germany (6)
- Great Britain (2)
- Hungary (1)
- Italy (1)
- Japan (3)
- Kazakhstan (1)
- Luxembourg (1)
- Netherlands (2)
- Norway (2)
- Poland (3)
- Russia (7)
- South Africa (1)
- Sweden (3)
- Ukraine (5)
- United States (11)
- Uzbekistan (1)
- Venezuela (1)

== Medal table ==
| Rank | Nation | Gold | Silver | Bronze | Total |
|---|---|---|---|---|---|
| 1 | Russia | 5 | 2 | 0 | 7 |
| 2 | Ukraine | 1 | 1 | 2 | 4 |
| 3 | United States | 0 | 2 | 0 | 2 |
| 4 | Chinese Taipei | 0 | 1 | 1 | 2 |
| 5 | Poland | 0 | 0 | 2 | 2 |
| 6 | Uzbekistan | 0 | 0 | 1 | 1 |
| Totals (6 entries) | | 6 | 6 | 6 | 18 |

== Events ==
=== Men's events ===
| Event | Gold | Silver | Bronze |
|---|---|---|---|
| Lightweight | Ravil Kazakov; Russia | Hsieh Tsung-ting; Chinese Taipei | Dariusz Wszoła; Poland |
| Middleweight | Andrey Tarasenko; Russia | Viktor Furazhkin; Russia | Jan Wegiera; Poland |
| Heavyweight | Nikolay Suslov; Russia | Brian Siders; United States | Ivan Freydun; Ukraine |

=== Women's events ===
| Event | Gold | Silver | Bronze |
|---|---|---|---|
| Lightweight | Olesya Lafina; Russia | Olena Dmytruk; Ukraine | Chen Wei-ling; Chinese Taipei |
| Middleweight | Larysa Vitsiyevska; Ukraine | Priscilla Ribic; United States | Nadezhda Malyugina; Uzbekistan |
| Heavyweight | Marina Kudinova; Russia | Galina Karpova; Russia | Iryna Yavorska; Ukraine |
