= Casting at the 2005 World Games =

- Venue: Sportpark Wedau
- Dates: 22–24 July 2005
- Competitors: 48 from 13 nations

The casting tournaments at the 2005 World Games in Duisburg was played between 22 and 24 July. 48 athletes, from 13 nations, participated in the tournament. The casting competition took place in Sportpark Wedau.

== Participating nations ==
- Austria (5)
- Croatia (1)
- Czech Republic (7)
- Germany (10)
- Japan (2)
- Lithuania (3)
- Poland (6)
- Slovakia (5)
- Slovenia (2)
- South Africa (1)
- Sweden (2)
- Switzerland (3)
- United States (1)

== Medal table ==
Rank	Nation	Gold	Silver	Bronze	Total
1	Germany	2	1	2	5
2	Czech Republic	1	2	2	5
3	Austria	1	1	0	2
4	Poland	1	0	2	3
5	Croatia	1	0	0	1
6	Japan	0	1	0	1
6	United States	0	1	0	1
Totals (7 entries)		6	6	6	18

== Events ==
=== Men ===
Event	Gold	Silver	Bronze
Fly accuracy	Patrik Lexa; Czech Republic	Iwana Inukai; Japan	Janusz Paprzycki; Poland
Fly distance single handed	Włodzimierz Targosz; Poland	Steve Rajeff; United States	Henry Mittel; Germany
Spinning accuracy arenberg target	Marko Popović; Croatia	Klaus-Jürgen Bruder; Germany	Jan Luxa; Czech Republic

=== Women ===
Event	Gold	Silver	Bronze
Fly accuracy	Jana Maisel; Germany	Alena Zinner; Austria	Monika Talar; Poland
Fly distance single handed	Alena Zinner; Austria	Zuzana Kočířová; Czech Republic	Kathrin Ernst; Germany
Spinning accuracy arenberg target	Jana Maisel; Germany	Jana Brončková; Czech Republic	Zuzana Kočířová; Czech Republic
