= Chen Wei-ling (weightlifter) =

Taiwanese weightlifter (born 1982)

Personal information
- Born: 4 January 1982 (age 44) Tainan, Taiwan
- Height: 1.49 m (4 ft 10 1/2 in)
- Weight: 47 kg (104 lb)

Sport
- Country: Chinese Taipei
- Sport: Weightlifting, powerlifting
- Event: Women's 48 kg (weightlifting)
Medal record
Women's weightlifting
Olympic Games
Gold medal – first place	2008 Beijing	48 kg
World Championships
Bronze medal – third place	2009 Goyang	48 kg
Asian Games
Bronze medal – third place	2010 Guangzhou	48 kg
Asian Championships
Gold medal – first place	2009 Taldykorgan	48 kg
East Asian Games
Silver medal – second place	2009 Hong Kong	48 kg
Women's powerlifting
World Games
Gold medal – first place	2009 Kaohsiung	Lightweight
Silver medal – second place	2013 Cali	Lightweight
Bronze medal – third place	2005 Duisburg	Lightweight
Bronze medal – third place	2017 Wrocław	Lightweight

Chen Wei-ling (Chinese: 陳葦綾; pinyin: Chén Wěilíng; born 4 January 1982) is a Taiwanese Olympic weightlifter and powerlifter.

== Achievements ==
Wei-Ling holds various all-time world records in powerlifting as follows:

44kg class

- Squat (single ply, with knee wraps) – 171.5kg @ 43.8kg.
- Deadlift (single ply) – 175kg @ 43.7kg.

47kg class

- Squat (raw) – 152.5kg @ 46.56kg.
- Squat (equipped) – 210kg @ 46.75kg.
- Deadlift (equipped) – 186kg.
- Total (raw) – 407.5kg @ 46.75kg.
- Total (equipped) – 500kg @ 46.56kg.

In weightlifting, Wei-Ling competed at the 2004 Summer Olympics in the 48kg class. She snatched 75kg and clean and jerked 95kg for a total of 170kg, ranking 11th.

At the 2008 Summer Olympics, Wei-Ling originally won the bronze medal in the 48kg category. She snatched 84kg and clean and jerked 112kg for a total of 196kg. She was later awarded the gold medal in 2017, after the original gold and silver medallists were disqualified for drug use.

== Best competition lifts ==
=== Powerlifting ===
Equipped

- Squat: 210kg
- Bench Press: 95kg
- Deadlift: 195kg
- Total: 495kg
- Open: 668.275 Wilks points

==== Raw ====
- Squat: 145kg
- Bench Press: 77.5kg
- Deadlift: 172.5kg
- Total: 395kg
- Open: 533.684 Wilks points

=== Weightlifting ===
- Snatch: 87kg
- Clean and Jerk: 113kg
- Total: 200kg

== Major results ==
=== Weightlifting ===
Year	Venue	Weight	Snatch (kg)				Clean & Jerk (kg)				Total	Rank
Year	Venue	Weight	1	2	3	Rank	1	2	3	Rank	Total	Rank
Olympic Games
2004	Athens, Greece	48 kg	72.5	~~75.0~~	75.0	10	95.0	~~102.5~~	~~102.5~~	9	170	11
2008	Beijing, China	48 kg	84	~~87~~	~~87~~	3rd place, bronze medalist(s)	108	112	~~115~~	1st place, gold medalist(s)	196	1st place, gold medalist(s)
2016	Rio de Janeiro, Brazil	48 kg	75	79	81	7	~~99~~	~~100~~	100	6	181	7
World Championships
2003	Vancouver, Canada	48 kg	~~70~~	~~70~~	70	16	90	~~95.0~~	~~95.0~~	16	160	15
2006	Santo Domingo, Dominican Republic	48 kg	67	70	~~71~~	13	82	87	90	13	160	15
2007	Chiang Mai, Thailand	48 kg	~~76~~	76	~~80~~	14	~~96~~	96	~~105~~	12	172	11
2009	Goyang, South Korea	48 kg	80	84	~~86~~	5	108	112	~~115~~	3rd place, bronze medalist(s)	196	3rd place, bronze medalist(s)
2010	Antalya, Turkey	48 kg	77	80	~~82~~	4	98	102	105	3rd place, bronze medalist(s)	185	4
2015	Houston, United States	48 kg	80	83	~~86~~	5	100	~~105~~	105	7	188	5
Asian Games
2010	Guangzhou, China	48 kg	83	86	~~88~~	2nd place, silver medalist(s)	105	~~110~~	~~110~~	16	191	3rd place, bronze medalist(s)
Asian Championships
2009	Taldykorgan, Kazakhstan	48 kg	87	—N/a	—N/a	1st place, gold medalist(s)	113	—N/a	—N/a	1st place, gold medalist(s)	200	1st place, gold medalist(s)
2012	Pyeongtaek, South Korea	48 kg	62	68	71	9	83	90	95	8	166	8
2016	Tashkent, Uzbekistan	48 kg	79	83	85	3rd place, bronze medalist(s)	102	106	~~109~~	5	191	5
East Asian Games
2009	Hong Kong, China	48 kg	79	~~83~~	~~83~~	3rd place, bronze medalist(s)	105	113	—	1st place, gold medalist(s)	192	2nd place, silver medalist(s)

=== Powerlifting ===
Year	Venue	Weight	Squat (kg)				Bench Press (kg)				Deadlift (kg)				Total	Rank
Year	Venue	Weight	1	2	3	Rank	1	2	3	Rank	1	2	3	Rank	Total	Rank
World Games
2001	Akita, Japan	Lightweight	—	—	152.5	—	—	—	67.5	—	—	—	160	—	380	6
2005	Duisburg, Germany	Lightweight	162.5	172.5	~~177.5~~	—	65.0	70	72.5	—	170	177.5	182.5	—	427.5	3rd place, bronze medalist(s)
2009	(Chinese Taipei) Kaohsiung, Taiwan	Lightweight	190	200.5 WR	207.5 WR	—	85.0	90	92.5	—	180	187.5 WR	195 WR	—	495	1st place, gold medalist(s)
2013	Cali, Colombia	Lightweight	182.5	190	195	—	87.5	92.5	95	—	175	~~185~~	185	—	475 WR	2nd place, silver medalist(s)
2017	Wrocław, Poland	Lightweight	~~175~~	175	185	—	80	85	87.5	—	170	180	~~197.5~~	—	452.5	3rd place, bronze medalist(s)
World Equipped Championships
2001	Frýdek-Místek, Czech Republic	44 kg	—	—	152.5	2nd place, silver medalist(s)	—	—	62.5	7	—	—	165	1st place, gold medalist(s)	380	1st place, gold medalist(s)
2002	Riesa, Germany	44 kg	—	—	152.5	2nd place, silver medalist(s)	—	—	65	5	—	—	165	1st place, gold medalist(s)	382.5	1st place, gold medalist(s)
2003	Chicago, United States	44 kg	—	—	155	2nd place, silver medalist(s)	—	—	65	9	—	—	170	1st place, gold medalist(s)	390	1st place, gold medalist(s)
2005	Ylitornio, Finland	44 kg	155	165	171.5 WR	1st place, gold medalist(s)	62.5	~~67.5~~	~~67.5~~	3rd place, bronze medalist(s)	160	170	~~177.5~~	1st place, gold medalist(s)	404 WRJ	1st place, gold medalist(s)
2006	Stavanger, Norway	48 kg	165	170	175	1st place, gold medalist(s)	65	70	~~72.5~~	6	160	170	177.5	1st place, gold medalist(s)	422.5	1st place, gold medalist(s)
2007	Sölden, Austria	48 kg	175	190	197.5	1st place, gold medalist(s)	67.5	72.5	75	8	170	180	185	1st place, gold medalist(s)	457.5	1st place, gold medalist(s)
2008	St. John's, Canada	52 kg	190	202.5	207.5	1st place, gold medalist(s)	75	80	82.5	9	175	185	190	2nd place, silver medalist(s)	480	1st place, gold medalist(s)
2011	Plzeň, Czech Republic	47 kg	175	182.5	187.5 WR	1st place, gold medalist(s)	82.5	87.5	90	4	175	182.5	185 WR	1st place, gold medalist(s)	462.5 WR	1st place, gold medalist(s)
2012	Aguadilla, Puerto Rico	47 kg	177.5	185	190	1st place, gold medalist(s)	80	85	~~87.5~~	5	170	180	~~190~~	1st place, gold medalist(s)	455	1st place, gold medalist(s)
2013	Stavanger, Norway	47 kg	190	195	197.5 WR	1st place, gold medalist(s)	85	92.5	97.5	2nd place, silver medalist(s)	170	180	185.5 WR	1st place, gold medalist(s)	480.5 WR	1st place, gold medalist(s)
2014	Aurora, United States	47 kg	185	195	200 WR	1st place, gold medalist(s)	85	92.5	97.5	4	172.5	182.5	186 WR	1st place, gold medalist(s)	483.5 WR	1st place, gold medalist(s)
2016	Orlando, United States	47 kg	195	202.5	210 WR	1st place, gold medalist(s)	90	100	105	3rd place, bronze medalist(s)	175	185	~~195~~	1st place, gold medalist(s)	500 WR	1st place, gold medalist(s)
World Classic Championships
2012	Stockholm, Sweden	47 kg	132.5	140.0 WR	145.0 WR	1st place, gold medalist(s)	67.5	72.5	77.5	2nd place, silver medalist(s)	160.0 WR	170.0 WR	172.5 WR	1st place, gold medalist(s)	395.0 WR	1st place, gold medalist(s)
2015	Salo, Finland	47 kg	140	147.5 WR	152.5 WR	1st place, gold medalist(s)	72.5	80	~~85~~	2nd place, silver medalist(s)	165	172.5	175 WR	1st place, gold medalist(s)	407.5 WR	1st place, gold medalist(s)
World Junior Equipped Championships
2001	Sofia, Bulgaria	43.9	—	—	150	1st place, gold medalist(s)	—	—	65	4	—	—	160	1st place, gold medalist(s)	375	1st place, gold medalist(s)
Asian Championships
2001	New Delhi, India	44 kg	—	—	150	—	—	—	60	—	—	—	160	—	370	1st place, gold medalist(s)
2002	Donghae, South Korea	44 kg	—	—	130	—	—	—	62.5	—	—	—	160	—	352.5	1st place, gold medalist(s)
2007	(Chinese Taipei) Kaohsiung, Taiwan	48 kg	~~170~~	170	190	—	70	75	—	—	170	182.5	—	—	447.5	1st place, gold medalist(s)
