= Bowling at the 2005 World Games =

2005 pin-bowling events in Duisburg, Ruhr, Germany

- Venue: RRZ / Bowling Center (ten-pin); Sporthalle Krefelder Straße (nine-pin)
- Dates: 15–20 July 2005
- Competitors: 64 from 29 nations

The bowling events at the 2005 World Games in Duisburg was played between 15 and 20 July. 64 competitors, from 29 nations, participated in the tournament. The bowling competition took place at RRZ / Bowling Center, where ten-pin events were held and in Sporthalle Krefelder Straße, where nine-pin events were held.

== Participating nations ==
- Argentina (1)
- Belgium (4)
- Bosnia and Herzegovina (2)
- Brazil (2)
- Canada (2)
- Chinese Taipei (2)
- Croatia (2)
- Dominican Republic (2)
- Finland (2)
- France (4)
- Germany (4)
- Great Britain (2)
- Greece (2)
- Hong Kong (2)
- Italy (2)
- Japan (2)
- Luxembourg (2)
- Malaysia (2)
- Netherlands (4)
- Panama (2)
- Philippines (2)
- Puerto Rico (2)
- Serbia and Montenegro (1)
- Singapore (2)
- South Korea (2)
- Thailand (2)
- Turkey (2)
- United States (2)
- Venezuela (2)

== Medal table ==
Rank	Nation	Gold	Silver	Bronze	Total
1	Germany	2	0	0	2
2	Luxembourg	1	1	1	3
3	South Korea	1	0	1	2
4	Finland	1	0	0	1
4	France	1	0	0	1
6	Belgium	0	2	0	2
7	Netherlands	0	1	1	2
8	Great Britain	0	1	0	1
8	Malaysia	0	1	0	1
10	Brazil	0	0	1	1
10	Canada	0	0	1	1
10	United States	0	0	1	1
Totals (12 entries)		6	6	6	18

== Events ==
Event	Gold	Silver	Bronze
Men's nine-pin singles	Steve Blasen; Luxembourg	Guus Maes; Netherlands	Bernardo Ramalho; Brazil
Men's ten-pin singles	Kai Virtanen; Finland	Gery Verbruggen; Belgium	Andrew Cain; United States
Women's nine-pin singles	Elgin Justen; Germany	Petra Comoth; Belgium	Marceline Della Modesta; Luxembourg
Women's ten-pin singles	Kim Soo-kyung; South Korea	Zara Glover; Great Britain	Caroline Lagrange; Canada
Mixed nine-pin doubles	Germany; Holger Mayer; Elgin Justen	Luxembourg; Steve Blasen; Marceline Della Modesta	Netherlands; Guus Maes; Marjon Berends
Mixed ten-pin doubles	France; François Sacco; Isabelle Saldjian	Malaysia; Zulmazran Zulkifli; Shalin Zulkifli	South Korea; Kang Hee-won; Kim Soo-kyung
