= Women's powerlifting in Australia =

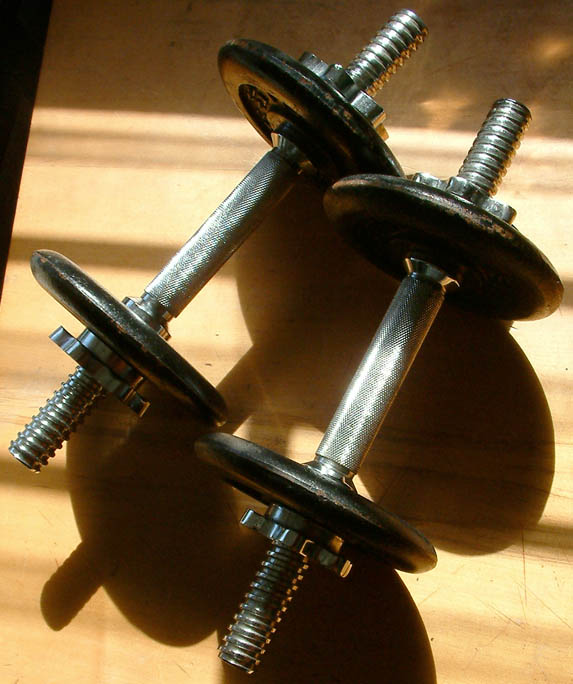
- Two dumbbells
- Country: Australia
- National team: Australia

== Early Female Powerlifting in Australia ==
Margaret Court was known by the British press as the 'Australian Amazon." She was one of the first Australian women to encourage women to integrate weightlifting into their training regime for other sports like tennis.

Bodybuilding was introduced to Australia in 1981. The sport came over because of American influence.

During the 1980s and 1990s, women's powerlifting saw a large expansion in the number of competitors. Interest in the sport increased as women started adding resistance work to their regular work outs. There was crossover with other sports. Australian Commonwealth Games competitors and Australians Olympians who took up the sport include Bev Francis, a shot putter and javelin thrower.

The first Australian woman to set a world record in powerlifting was Jill Bamborough. She did this in 1978 in the bantam weight when she lifted 147 kilograms (324 lb). A famous Australian powerlifter was Robin Weckert. She competed in the 75 kilograms (165 lb) class. Australia has had several world champion powerlifters including Heidi Wittisch in the 75 kilograms (165 lb) class at the 1988 world champions. That same year, Marilyn Wallen in the 60 kilograms (130 lb) class and Gael Martin in the 90 kilograms (200 lb) class won silver medals.

Bev Francis is an Australian powerlifter who has faced discrimination in the sport as a result of her body type. Critics had harsh things to state about the amount of muscle mass she possessed, claiming that she had too much muscle. Some of her critics taunted her at powerlifting events by calling her a freak.

In 1984, there were 257 junior female members of the Australian Amateur Weightlifting Federation.

== Modern Female Powerlifting in Australia ==
=== Participation Rates ===
In 2022, there were 1,517 women recorded as having competed in at least one powerlifting competition that year.

=== IPF World Record Holders ===
The IPF is the GAISF-recognised international powerlifting umbrella body, with (as of 2024) the Australian Powerlifting Alliance operating as the national federation. As of June 2023, the following IPF World Records are held by Australian lifters:

- Bethany Parker - Sub-Junior Women -84kg Classic Division Squat (182.5kg)
- Bethany Parker - Sub-Junior Women -84kg Classic Division Total (481.5kg)
- Glenda Presutti - Masters 3 Women -57kg Classic Division Squat (115kg)
- Glenda Presutti - Masters 3 Women -57kg Classic Division Total (322.5)
- Peta Day - Masters 3 Women -84kg Classic Division Deadlift (160kg)
- Helen Allen - Masters 2 Women -57kg Equipped Division Deadlift (183kg)
- Natalie Laalaai - Open Women 84+kg Classic Division Deadlift (268.0kg)

== Bibliography ==
- Stell, Marion K. (1991). Half the Race, A history of Australian women in sport. North Ryde, Australia: HarperCollins. ISBN 0-207-16971-3.
