= Theater am Marientor =

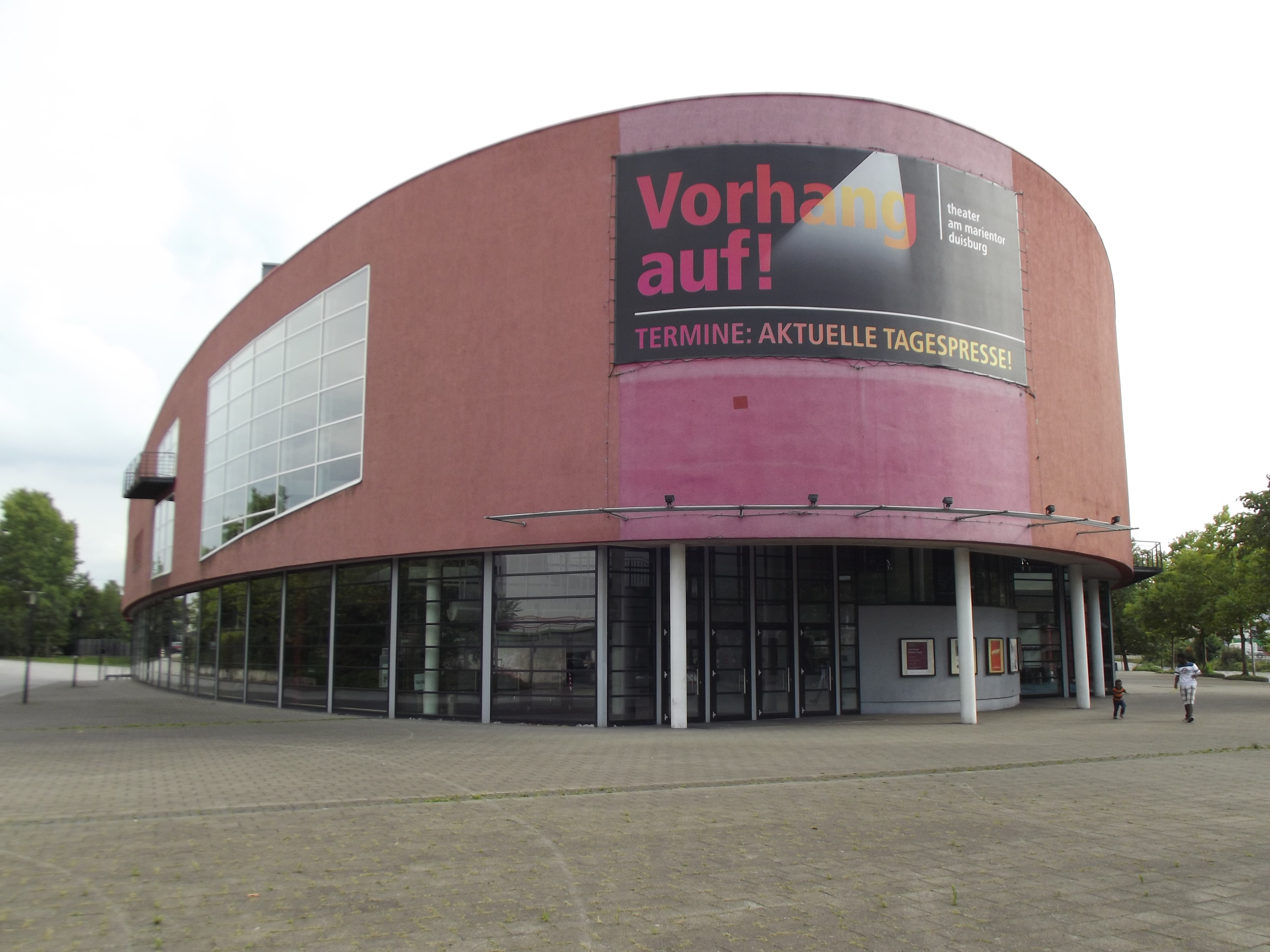

- Location within North Rhine-Westphalia
- Location: Duisburg, Germany
- Coordinates: 51°25′45″N 6°45′25″E

Website
- https://www.theater-am-marientor.de/

Theater am Marientor is a theatre in Duisburg, North Rhine-Westphalia, Germany.
