= Ukraine at the 2005 World Games =

Ukraine at the World Games 2005
- IOC code: UKR
- NOC: National Olympic Committee of Ukraine

in Duisburg, Germany 14 – 24 July 2005
- Medals Ranked 7th: Gold 7 Silver 6 Bronze 8 Total 21

World Games appearances (overview)
- 1993; 1997; 2001; 2005; 2009; 2013; 2017; 2022; 2025

Ukraine competed at the 2005 World Games in Duisburg, Germany, from 14 to 24 July 2005. Ukrainian athletes competed in acrobatic gymnastics, bodybuilding, dancesport, dragon boat, finswimming, orienteering, parachuting, powerlifting, rhythmic gymnastics, sport climbing, sumo, trampoline gymnastics. Ukraine did not compete in squash.

== Medalists ==
=== Main programme ===
Medal	Name	Sport	Event
Gold	Vladyslav Hlushchenko; Oleksandr Bondarenko; Andriy Bondarenko; Andriy Perunov	Acrobatic gymnastics	Men's groups
Gold	Iryna Petrenko	Bodybuilding	Women's 52 kg
Gold	Larysa Vitsiyevska	Powerlifting	Women's middleweight
Gold	Anna Bessonova	Rhythmic gymnastics	Rope
Gold	Vitaliy Tikhenko	Sumo	Men's 85 kg
Gold	Alina Boykova	Sumo	Women's 65 kg
Gold	Olena Chabanenko	Trampoline gymnastics	Women's tumbling
Silver	Mykola Cherbak; Serhiy Popov	Acrobatic gymnastics	Men's pairs
Silver	Dmytro Sydorenko; Viktor Panov; Dmytro Artemchuk; Ihor Soroka	Finswimming	Men's 4 × 100 m surface relay
Silver	Olena Dmytruk	Powerlifting	Women's lightweight
Silver	Anna Bessonova	Rhythmic gymnastics	Ball
Silver	Natalia Hodunko	Rhythmic gymnastics	Ribbon
Silver	Olena Ryepko	Sport climbing	Women's speed
Bronze	Serhiy Pelepets; Maryna Chevchuk	Acrobatic gymnastics	Mixed pairs
Bronze	Viktor Panov	Finswimming	Men's 200 m surface
Bronze	Ihor Soroka	Finswimming	Men's 50 m apnoea
Bronze	Ivan Freydun	Powerlifting	Men's heavyweight
Bronze	Iryna Yavorska	Powerlifting	Women's heavyweight
Bronze	Natalia Hodunko	Rhythmic gymnastics	Rope
Bronze	Natalia Hodunko	Rhythmic gymnastics	Clubs
Bronze	Anna Bessonova	Rhythmic gymnastics	Ribbon

== Dragon boat ==
Athlete	Event	Heats		Repechage		Semifinals		Final	
Athlete	Event	Result	Rank	Result	Rank	Result	Rank	Result	Rank
Team Ukraine	200 m	47.55	3 q R	47.90	2 q FC	Did not advance		48.44	10
Team Ukraine	500 m	1:57.92	3 q R	1:59.96	3 q FC	Did not advance		2:01.52	10
Team Ukraine	1000 m	—						4:05.71	8
Team Ukraine	2000 m	—						8:14.38	8

== Orienteering ==
Men

Athlete	Event	Time	Rank
Yuri Omeltchenko	Men's middle distance	39:09.1	5

== External sources ==
- Infosystem of the 2005 World Games
