= Wilks coefficient =

Measurement system of the relative strength of powerlifters

The Wilks coefficient or Wilks formula is a mathematical coefficient that can be used to measure the relative strengths of powerlifters despite the different weight classes of the lifters. Robert Wilks, CEO of Powerlifting Australia, is the author of the formula.

== Equation ==
=== Original version ===
The following equation is used to calculate the Wilks coefficient:

$$\text{Coeff} = \frac{500}{a + bx + cx^2 + dx^3 + ex^4 + fx^5}$$

where x is the body weight of the lifter in kilograms.

The total weight lifted (in kg) is multiplied by the coefficient to find the standard amount lifted, normalised across all body weights.

Values
	Men	Women
a	-216.0475144	594.31747775582
b	16.2606339	−27.23842536447
c	-0.002388645	0.82112226871
d	-0.00113732	−0.00930733913
e	7.01863 × 10^{−6}	4.731582 × 10^{−5}
f	−1.291 × 10^{−8}	−9.054 × 10^{−8}

=== 2020 version ===
The formula was updated in March 2020 to allow for a rebalancing of coefficients, with men and women's performances better aligned and the extreme bodyweight classes brought into better balance with the middle bodyweight classes.

$$\text{Coeff} = \frac{600}{a + bx + cx^2 + dx^3 + ex^4 + fx^5}$$

where x is the body weight of the lifter in kilograms.

The total weight lifted (in kg) is multiplied by the coefficient to find the standard amount lifted, normalised across all body weights.

Values
	Men	Women
a	47.46178854	-125.4255398
b	8.472061379	13.71219419
c	0.07369410346	-0.03307250631
d	-0.001395833811	-0.001050400051
e	7.07665973070743 × 10^{−6}	9.38773881462799 × 10^{−6}
f	-1.20804336482315 x 10^{−8}	-2.3334613884954 × 10^{−8}

== Validity ==
One journal article has been written on the topic of Wilks formula validation. Based on the men's and women's world record holders and the top two performers for each event in the IPF's 1996 and 1997 World Championships (a total of 30 men and 27 women for each lift), it concluded:

- There is no bias for men's or women's bench press and total.
- There is a favorable bias toward intermediate weight class lifters in the women's squat with no bias for men's squat.
- There is a linear unfavorable bias toward heavier men and women in the deadlift.

== Example ==
The main function of the Wilks formula is involved in powerlifting contests. It is used to identify the best lifters across the different body-weight categories and can also be used to compare male and female lifters as there are formulas for both sexes. First, second and third places on the winner's podium within their own age, bodyweight and gender classes are awarded to the competitors who lift the most weight respectively. Where two lifters in a class achieve the same combined total lifted weight, the lighter lifter is determined the winner.

The Wilks formula comes into play when comparing and determining overall champions across the different categories. The formula can also be used in team and handicap competitions where the team includes lifters of significantly varying bodyweights. The Wilks formula, like its predecessors (the O'Carroll and Schwartz formulas), was set up to address the imbalances whereby lighter lifters tend to have a greater Power-to-weight ratio, with lighter lifters tending to lift more weight in relation to their own body-weight. This occurs for a number of reasons relating to simple physics, the nature of the makeup and limitations of the human skeletal and muscular system as well as the shorter leverages of smaller people. Note the totals section and that lighter lifters below 100 kg body-weight achieve totals in excess of ten times bodyweight whereas heavier lifters do not. The Wilks system is primarily a handicapping process that provides an adjusted statistical method to compare all lifters of varying classes and groups on an equal standing and makes allowances for the disparities.

According to this setup, a male athlete weighing 320 pounds and lifting a total of 1400 pounds would have a normalised lift weight of 353.0, and a lifter weighing 200 pounds and lifting a total of 1000 pounds (the sum of their highest successful attempts at the squat, bench, and deadlift) would have a normalised lift weight of 288.4. Thus the 320-pound lifter would win this competition. Notably, the lighter lifter is actually stronger for his body-weight, with a total of 5 times his own weight, while the heavier lifter could only manage 4.375 times his own bodyweight. In this way, the Wilks Coefficient places a greater emphasis on absolute strength, rather than ranking lifters solely based on the relative strength of the lifter compared to body-weight. This creates an even playing field between light and heavyweight lifters—the lighter lifters tend to have a higher relative strength level in comparison to the heavyweight lifters, who tend to have a greater amount of absolute strength.

== Alternatives ==
While Wilks coefficient was used in the IPF up until the end of 2018, other federations use other coefficients or they even made one of their own like NASA. The switch by IPF comes at a time where Olympic Weightlifting Federation (IWF) decided in June 2018 to change from the existing Sinclair coefficient to Robi Points. Former IWF Technology Director Robert Nagy developed the Robi Points system. The Robi Points are calculated based on the actual World Records in the category and the point value of a result equal to a World Record is the same (1000 points) in all bodyweight categories

Alternatives are Glossbrenner coefficient (WPC), Reshel coefficient (GPC, GPA, WUAP, IRP), Outstanding Lifter (OL) or NASA coefficient (NASA), Schwartz/Malone coefficient and Siff coefficient.

While all coefficients take into account gender and body weight difference there are some that also take into account age difference. For cadet and junior age group Foster coefficient is used and for master age group (40yo and above) McCulloch or Reshel coefficient.

== See also ==
- Sinclair coefficient
