= 2005 World Games =

Multi-sport event in Duisburg, Germany

World Games VII
- Host city: Duisburg, Germany
- Nations: 93
- Athletes: appr. 3,200
- Events: 169 (31 sports)
- Opening: 14 July 2005
- Closing: 24 July 2005
- Opened by: Otto Schily; Federal Minister of the Interior of Germany
- Main venue: MSV-Arena
- Website: worldgames2005.de (archived)

The 2005 World Games, the seventh World Games, also known as Duisburg 2005, were an international multi-sport event held in Duisburg, Germany from 14 July 2005 until 24 July 2005. Three other cities, namely Bottrop, Mülheim an der Ruhr, and Oberhausen, also held some of the competition events. More than 3,000 athletes competed in 31 official sports and 6 invitational sports.

== Sports ==
=== Official sports ===
The 2005 World Games programme featured 31 official sports, and 6 invitational sports. The numbers in parentheses indicate the number of medal events, which were contested in each sports discipline.

- Acrobatic gymnastics (5)
- Aerobic gymnastics (5)
- Air sports (5)
- Artistic roller skating (4)
- Bodybuilding (7)
- Boules sports (6)
- Bowling (6)
- Canoe polo (2)
- Casting (6)
- Cue sports (4)
- Dancesport (3)
- Field archery (6)
- Finswimming (10)
- Fistball (1)
- Flying disc (1)
- Inline hockey (1)
- Inline speed skating (12)
- Ju-jitsu (10)
- Karate (13)
- Korfball (1)
- Lifesaving (16)
- Orienteering (3)
- Powerlifting (6)
- Rhythmic gymnastics (4)
- Rugby sevens (1)
- Sport climbing (4)
- Squash (2)
- Sumo (8)
- Trampoline gymnastics (6)
- Tug of war (3)
- Water skiing (8)

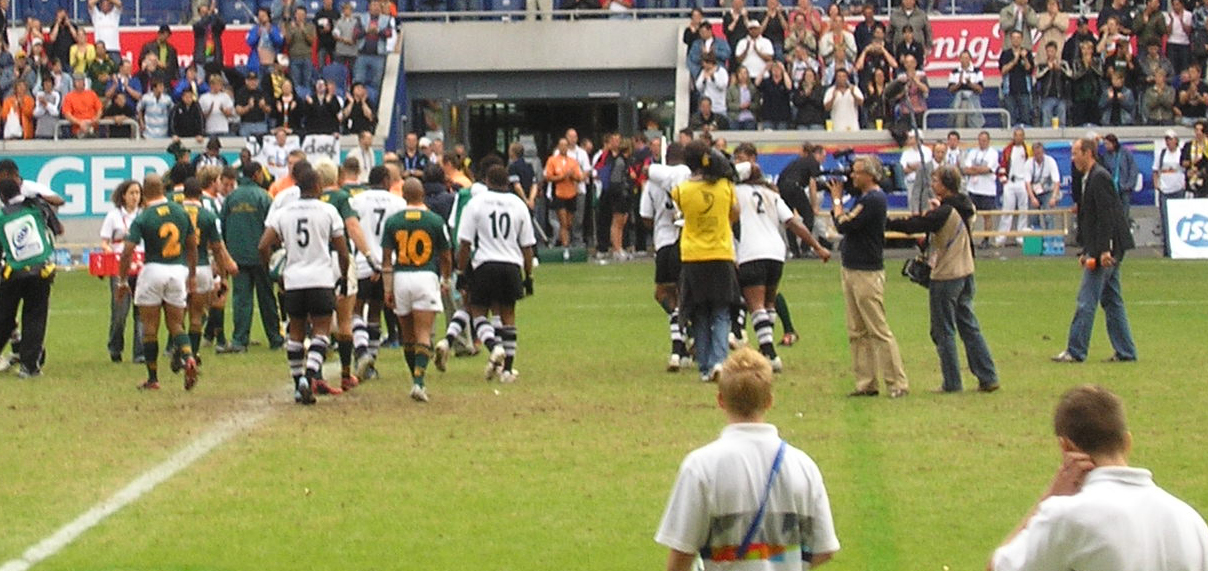
Fiji's gold medal win in rugby

=== Invitational sports ===
Aikido was also one of the invitational sports, but it was deemed a demonstration sport; no medal events were held.

- American football (1)
- Beach handball (2)
- Dragon boat (4)
- Indoor hockey (2)
- Indoor motorcycle trials (1)

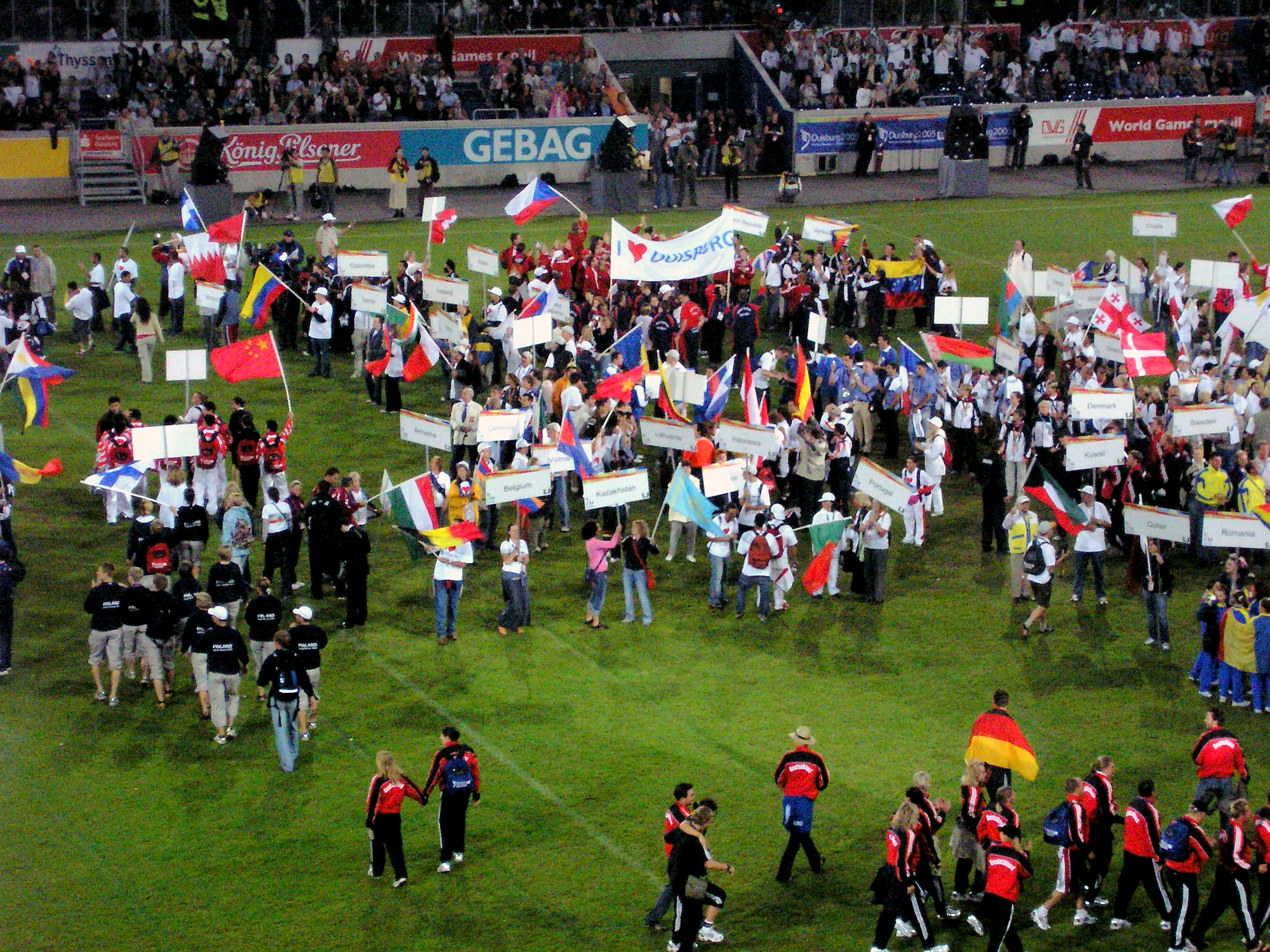
Athletes at the closing ceremony

== Medal table ==
=== Official sports ===
The medal tally during the seventh World Games is as follows. Russia won the most gold medals and tied with Germany in overall medals won in this edition's official sports. There was a tie for second place in one sport climbing event (two silver and no bronze medals awarded). Two bronze medals were awarded in each of the two squash events.

* Host nation (Germany)

Rank	Nation	Gold	Silver	Bronze	Total
1	Russia (RUS)	27	19	11	57
2	Germany (GER)*	19	18	20	57
3	Italy (ITA)	13	9	13	35
4	France (FRA)	12	12	11	35
5	Australia (AUS)	7	9	4	20
6	United States (USA)	7	7	9	23
7	Ukraine (UKR)	7	6	8	21
8	Spain (ESP)	6	6	3	15
9	Netherlands (NED)	5	8	4	17
10	Denmark (DEN)	5	1	0	6
11	Japan (JPN)	4	8	6	18
12	China (CHN)	4	5	3	12
13	Austria (AUT)	4	3	1	8
14	Switzerland (SUI)	4	1	3	8
15	Great Britain (GBR)	3	5	10	18
16	Colombia (COL)	3	4	4	11
17	Poland (POL)	3	2	6	11
18	Sweden (SWE)	3	2	1	6
19	Belgium (BEL)	2	4	5	11
20	New Zealand (NZL)	2	4	0	6
21	Canada (CAN)	2	2	4	8
22	Chinese Taipei (TPE)	2	2	2	6
23	South Korea (KOR)	2	1	3	6
24	Egypt (EGY)	2	0	3	5
25	Czech Republic (CZE)	1	3	4	8
26	Romania (ROM)	1	2	1	4
26	Slovakia (SVK)	1	2	1	4
28	Greece (GRE)	1	2	0	3
29	Argentina (ARG)	1	1	3	5
30	Brazil (BRA)	1	1	2	4
30	Croatia (CRO)	1	1	2	4
30	Venezuela (VEN)	1	1	2	4
33	Luxembourg (LUX)	1	1	1	3
34	Malaysia (MAS)	1	1	0	2
34	Qatar (QAT)	1	1	0	2
36	Norway (NOR)	1	0	2	3
36	Turkey (TUR)	1	0	2	3
38	Bosnia and Herzegovina (BIH)	1	0	1	2
38	Finland (FIN)	1	0	1	2
40	Bulgaria (BUL)	1	0	0	1
40	Fiji (FIJ)	1	0	0	1
40	Hungary (HUN)	1	0	0	1
40	Lithuania (LTU)	1	0	0	1
40	Morocco (MAR)	1	0	0	1
40	Serbia and Montenegro (SCG)	1	0	0	1
46	Slovenia (SLO)	0	3	1	4
47	South Africa (RSA)	0	2	3	5
48	Belarus (BLR)	0	2	2	4
49	Portugal (POR)	0	1	2	3
50	Chile (CHI)	0	1	1	2
50	Estonia (EST)	0	1	1	2
50	Kazakhstan (KAZ)	0	1	1	2
53	Bahrain (BRN)	0	1	0	1
53	Hong Kong (HKG)	0	1	0	1
53	Madagascar (MAD)	0	1	0	1
53	Mexico (MEX)	0	1	0	1
53	Thailand (THA)	0	1	0	1
58	Ireland (IRL)	0	0	1	1
58	Peru (PER)	0	0	1	1
58	Uzbekistan (UZB)	0	0	1	1
Totals (60 entries)		169	170	170	509

=== Invitational sports ===
* Host nation (Germany)

Rank	Nation	Gold	Silver	Bronze	Total
1	Germany (GER)*	4	1	2	7
2	Russia (RUS)	3	1	1	5
3	Spain (ESP)	1	1	0	2
4	Czech Republic (CZE)	1	0	2	3
5	Brazil (BRA)	1	0	0	1
6	Switzerland (SUI)	0	3	0	3
7	Sweden (SWE)	0	1	1	2
8	Belarus (BLR)	0	1	0	1
8	Great Britain (GBR)	0	1	0	1
8	Hungary (HUN)	0	1	0	1
11	Croatia (CRO)	0	0	1	1
11	France (FRA)	0	0	1	1
11	Japan (JPN)	0	0	1	1
11	Turkey (TUR)	0	0	1	1
Totals (14 entries)		10	10	10	30
