= History of sport in France =

The history of sport in France is marked by distinct, relatively homogeneous periods of varying duration. Its origins can be traced to the Gallo-Roman era, followed by specific developments during the Middle Ages and the emergence of a structured discourse in the Renaissance. This discourse became more defined in the early 19th century with the promotion of gymnastics as an educational and hygienic activity. It was only in the late 19th century that efforts were made to associate sport with athletic competition, influenced by British aristocratic leisure practices. Early advocates faced limited support from public authorities and internal divisions between supporters of the Anglo-Saxon model and defenders of traditional French games. This formative period, lasting until the First World War, saw the emergence of Olympism and the division of French sport among three main organizations: the Union of Gymnastics Societies of France (founded in 1875), the Union of French Athletic Sports Societies, and the Gymnastics and Sports Federation of French Patronages. Beginning on July 1, 1901, these organizations operated within the framework of the new law on associations.

Following the Armistice of 11 November 1918, French sport began transitioning toward a modern structure, notably with the dissolution of the Union of French Athletic Sports Societies (USFSA) and the emergence of specialized single-sport federations. The Popular Front demonstrated interest in promoting sport, but it was under the Vichy regime that the first legislative framework was introduced with the Sports Charter of December 1940. This charter was repealed by the Provisional Government in Algiers in 1943, but a new ordinance in 1945 reaffirmed the national importance of sport and placed its administration under delegated authority. In the post-war years, the priority of national reconstruction delayed further development in the sports sector until 1960, when France's underperformance at the Rome Olympic Games prompted renewed attention. This led to a major sports infrastructure program, the allocation of civil servant positions to federations, and the organization of leadership training through the 1963 law establishing official certifications for sports instructors (BEES). A significant legislative development occurred in 1975 with a law addressing the structural organization of sport. Previously divided between the National Sports Committee and the French Olympic Committee, the federations were unified under the French National Olympic and Sports Committee. In 1984, a new law established a public service for physical and sports activities, which was immediately delegated to the sports movement. This legal framework, subsequently modified by successive ministers, continues to govern the organization and development of sport in contemporary France.

== From the protohistory of sport to the Modern Era ==
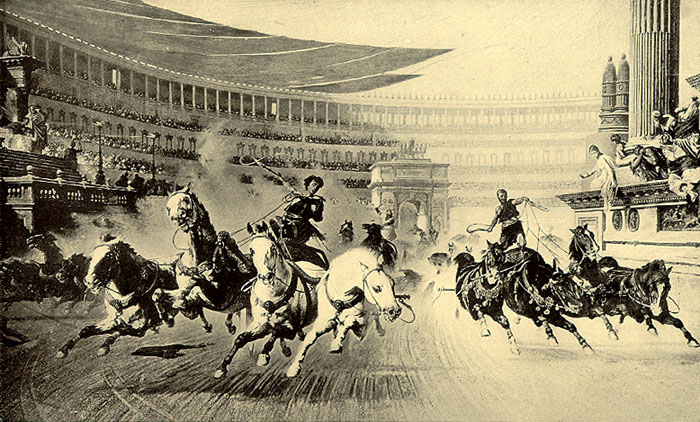
The chariot race.

Little is known about the physical activities of the early populations in the territories that constitute present-day France. However, in Mesopotamia and the Mediterranean Basin, such activities are documented in two main forms: military training and sacred rites, the latter often involving dance and acrobatics. According to Jacques Ulmann, “When their usual occupations leave them some leisure time, the heroes of Homer devote it to games. At rest, Achilles’ warriors throw the discus and javelin, and shoot arrows.” This recreational aspect, often intertwined with sacred practices, became institutionalized with the establishment of the Olympic Games around 776 BCE. By approximately 430 BCE, under the influence of Hippocratic thought, physical exercise had also acquired a prophylactic and hygienic role.

=== The Gallo-Roman period ===
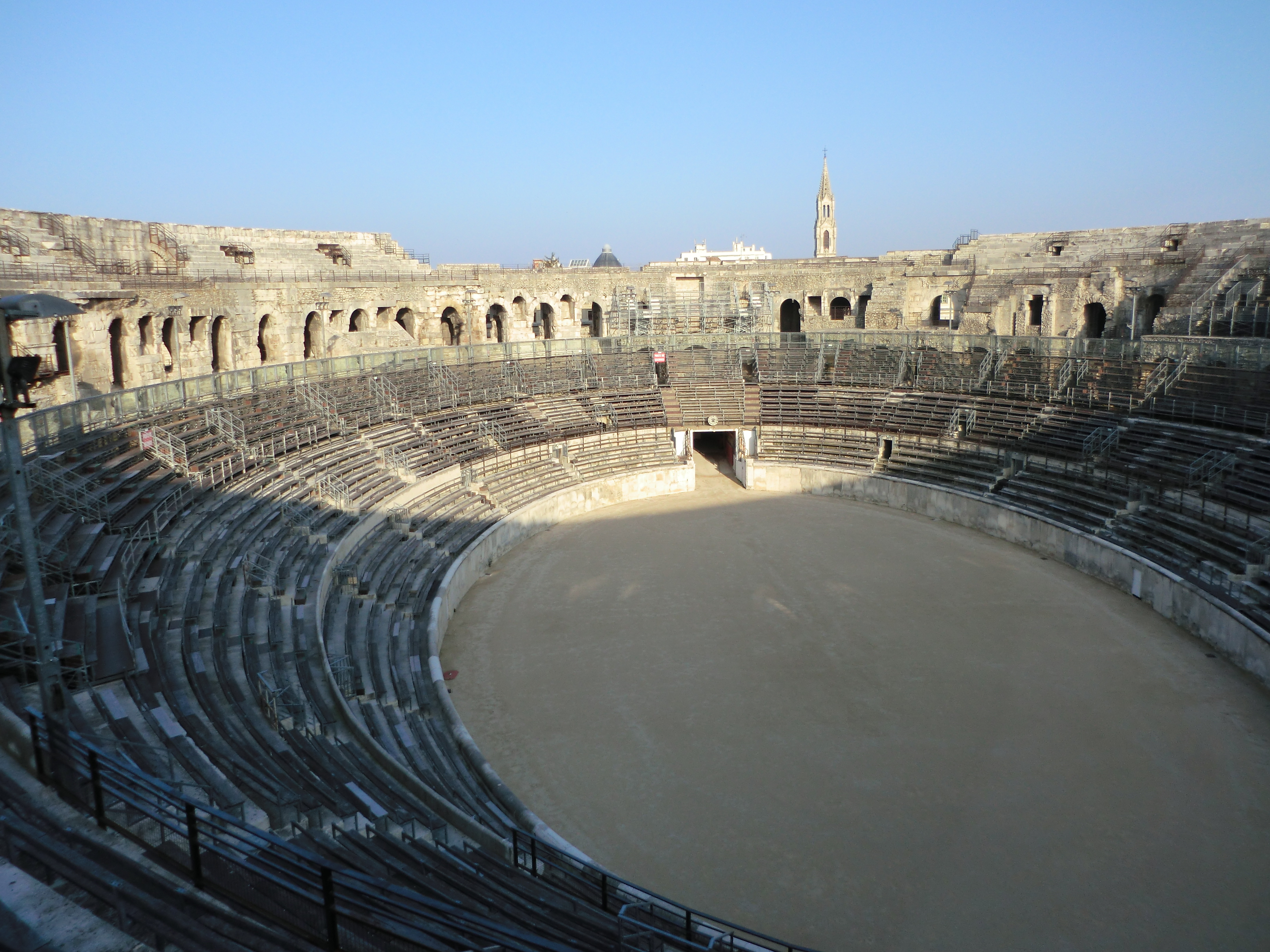
The arenas of Nîmes.

Organized sports were introduced into Gaul by the Romans, who adopted such practices from the Etruscans and Greeks. The construction of arenas, stadiums, and hippodromes accompanied this introduction. The period was characterized by chariot racing and public spectacles, including gladiatorial combat and wild animal fights. Notable Gallo-Roman monuments associated with these activities include the arenas of Nîmes and the remains of the circus in Arles. In the second century CE, the physician Claudius Galen emphasized the role of physical activity in maintaining health. In 393 CE, Emperor Theodosius I, influenced by Ambrose, Bishop of Milan, converted to Christianity and banned pagan rites and rituals, effectively ending public games in the Western Roman Empire. However, private physical activity, already in decline, appears to have continued with little disruption.

=== Middle Ages ===
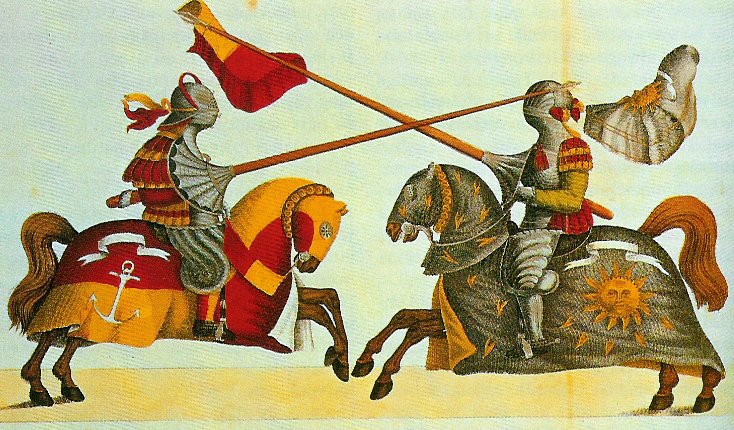
Horse jousting.

The tournament, first documented in 842, became a prominent martial activity from the 9th century onward. Characterized by significant violence, it often resulted in injuries and fatalities. Despite repeated prohibitions issued by the Church over several centuries, as well as royal bans—including one by King Louis IX in 1260—the practice persisted until the late 15th century. Initially open to physically capable men, tournaments served as a pathway to knighthood, though some events were restricted to military participants. From the 13th and 14th centuries, less violent variants such as equestrian jousting and pas d’armes emerged. These adaptations, along with other derivative activities like water jousting—practiced in France as early as the 12th century—were more accessible to the general public.

=== Sports in Ancien Régime France ===
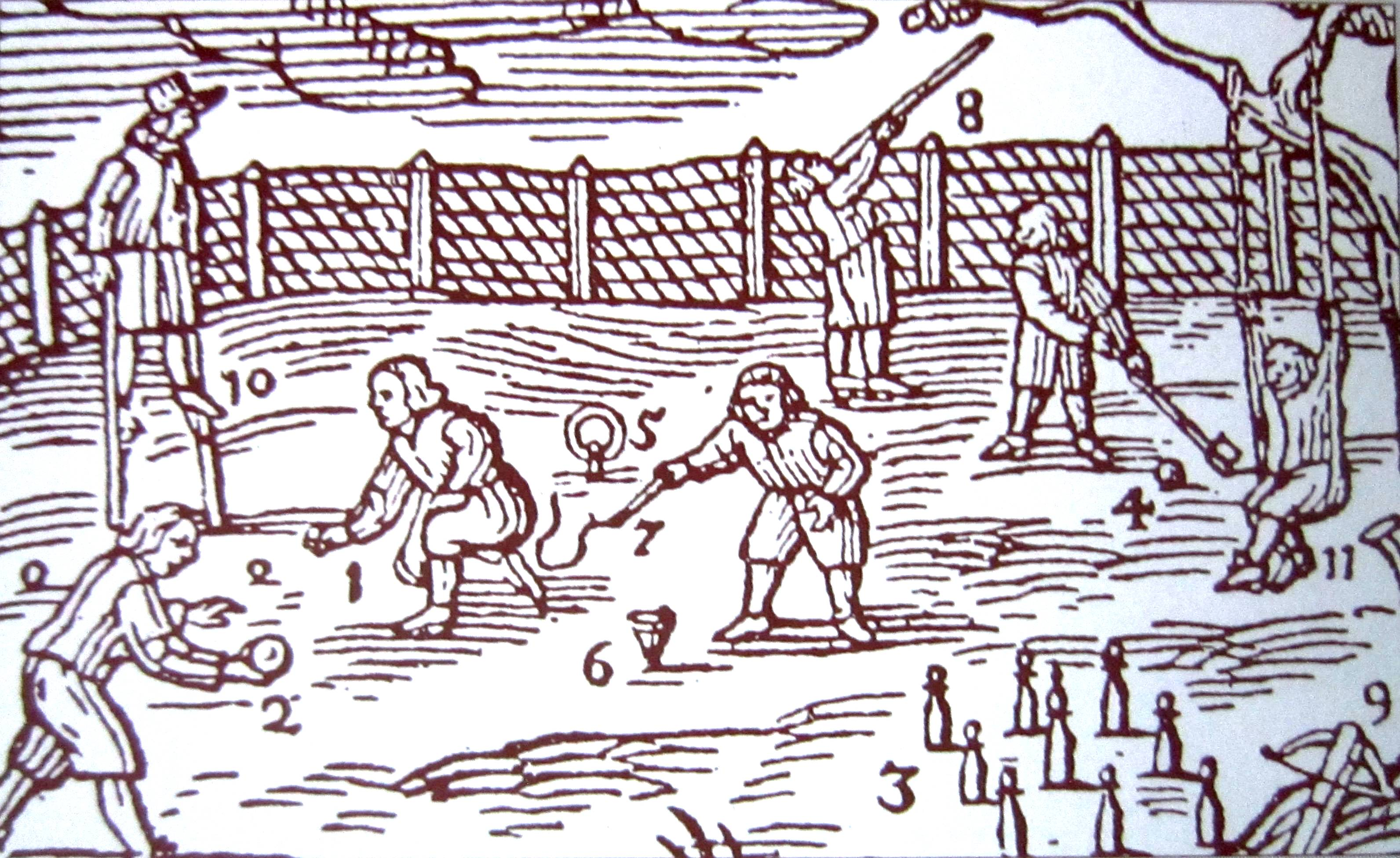
Popular games and sports around 1650 in Orbis sensualium pictus.

In 1534, François Rabelais published Gargantua, a work that provides extensive insight into contemporary games and physical activities, reflecting the humanist emphasis on physical education. The text references 218 games and sports, including the Roman game pila trigonalis. Prior to the French Revolution, sports and games such as soule, barres, crosse, billiards, croquet, cricket, regional skittles and wrestling, archery, fencing, and horse racing were practiced in France. Florentine calcio was occasionally played during ceremonial events. The earliest known mention of skittles in France dates to 1318, and of cricket to 1478 in Saint-Omer; (Note: Criquet is the name given to the wicket used as a goal.) cricket remained popular in France until the 18th century. The death of Henry II of France in 1559, following an equestrian joust, marked a decline in chivalric sports. The rise of Jansenism in educational thought, particularly exemplified by Charles Rollin's Treatise on Studies in the early 18th century, contributed to the marginalization of physical education, which had previously been supported by Jesuit institutions. From the late 17th century until the French Revolution, France experienced a decline in organized sports, often referred to as a "Jansenist parenthesis" in physical activity.

=== Roots of pedagogical renewal ===
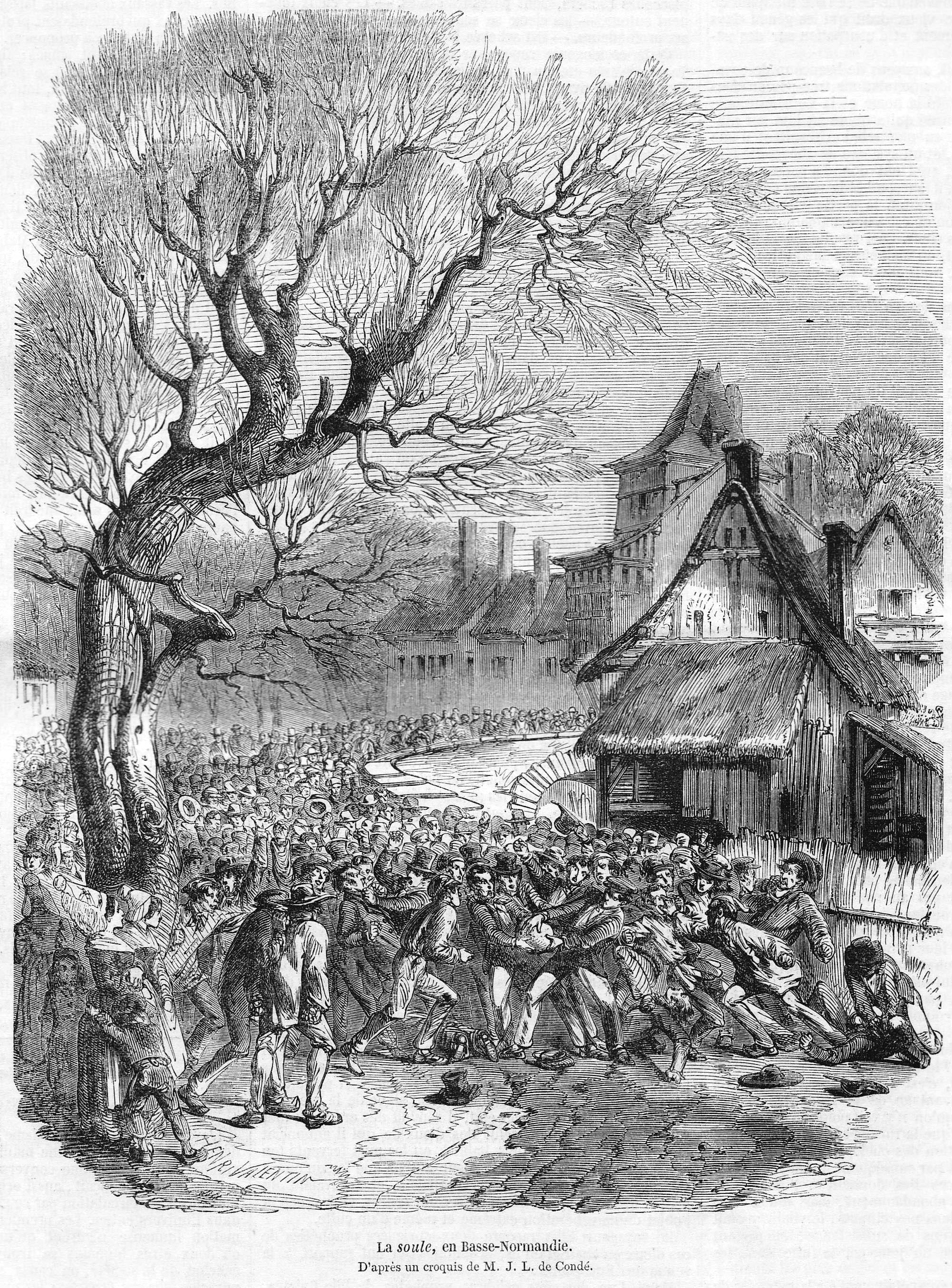
The game of soule.

The Reformation presented a pedagogical challenge, as many of its early proponents were students critical of the scholastic model of medieval universities. They questioned the purpose of education, prompting broader reflection on educational content. (Note: Ulmann 1977, pp. 157–158) Within the broader humanist movement that emerged in Italy, figures such as François Rabelais and Michel de Montaigne contributed to educational thought in France, although practical reforms remained limited. Significant implementation occurred within the Catholic Counter-Reformation, particularly through the influence of Ignatius of Loyola. Jesuit institutions incorporated physical activities such as dance, fencing, theater, games, and competitive exercises into their curricula, a model that spread throughout Europe and beyond. (Note: Ulmann 1977, pp. 156–157) Protestant educational reformers, including Jan Comenius, (Note: Ulmann 1977, p. 154) John Locke, (Note: Ulmann 1977, pp. 181–185) and Jean-Jacques Rousseau, (Note: Ulmann 1977, pp. 196–214) also contributed to this pedagogical discourse. Their ideas influenced early theorists of gymnastics such as Johann Bernhard Basedow, Johann Christoph Friedrich GutsMuths, (Note: Ulmann 1977, pp. 214–226) and Johann Heinrich Pestalozzi. (Note: Ulmann 1977, pp. 226–232) However, these developments remained primarily confined to German-speaking regions and only began to significantly influence France after the 1805 French translation of GutsMuths’ Gymnastics for Youth by Armar and Durivier.

=== Jeu de paume: A French passion ===
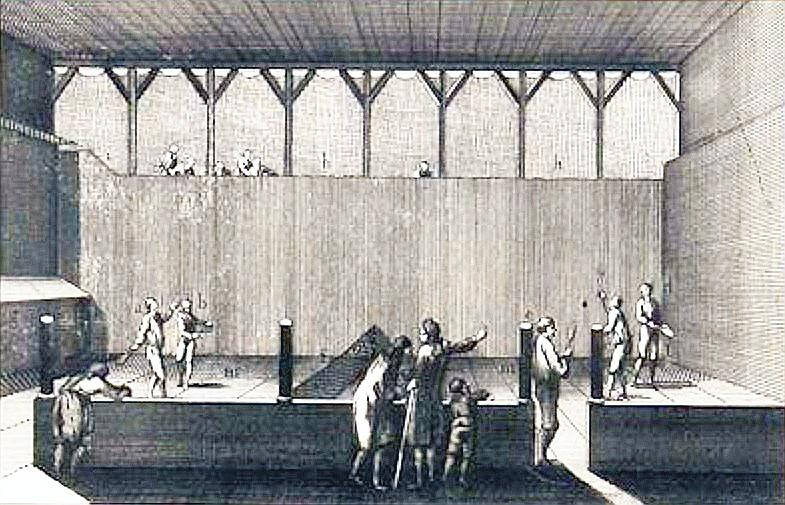
Palming game.

While the general population remained spectators of tournaments and equestrian jousts, jeu de paume emerged as a widely practiced sport in France from the 12th to the 18th century. Originally played with bare hands, it evolved with the introduction of the bat in the 15th century and the racket, strung with hemp or gut, which appeared in 1505 and became common by 1510. As a predecessor to modern tennis and Basque pelota, jeu de paume reached its height in the 15th and early 16th centuries, during a period when humanists such as Rabelais, Mercurialis, and Michel de Montaigne promoted a balance between intellectual and physical education. (Note: Later, Blaise Pascal used this metaphor in his arguments: "Do not tell me that I bring nothing new. It is the arrangement of the materials that is new: when playing jeu de paume, it is the same ball that we both play, but one of us places it better." (Pensées, published in 1670).) Numerous outdoor and indoor courts were established throughout France. (Note: The View of France by Sir Robert Dallington (1561–1637), published in 1604 after a stay in France in 1598, tells us that France is "a country dotted with jeu de paume courts, more numerous than churches, and with more players than there are beer drinkers in England," concluding: "The French are born with a racket in hand.") On November 9, 1527, King François I officially recognized professional sports by equating the earnings of jeu de paume players with regular wages, (Note: "Everything played in jeu de paume shall be paid to the winner as a reasonable debt earned through his labor.") reflecting the professionalization of the sport driven by widespread betting and stakes. Efforts to regulate the game followed. Louis XIII and Louis XIV attempted to limit the number of courts and promoted alternative activities, including billiards and horse racing. Despite its gradual decline in the 18th century, jeu de paume hosted the first recorded world championship of any sport in 1740, with Frenchman Clergé becoming the first world champion in sports history. The British adopted sporting values in the early 17th century, while in France, interest in sport diminished—possibly influenced by 18th-century Jansenist thought. By the eve of the French Revolution, France had largely lost its former prominence in organized sport.

== 19th century ==
The period between the French Revolution and the defeat at Sedan constitutes a relatively coherent phase in the history of sport in France.

=== Gymnastics movement ===
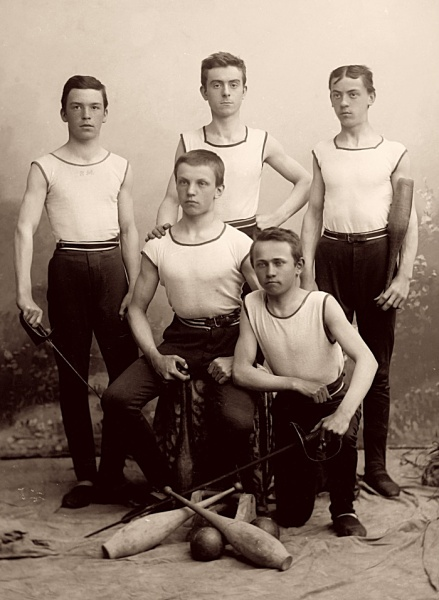
Czech Sokols.

Gymnastics, while occasionally sharing characteristics with earlier practices such as chivalric tournaments, is distinct in both its historical development and underlying philosophy. Unlike hedonistic or folkloric activities, gymnastics originated in military preparation and religious rites, as evidenced by ancient Egyptian hieroglyphs and the history of the Olympic Games. In the 17th century, the emerging industrial era assigned gymnastics a new social function: preparing future laborers for the physical demands of work. John Locke laid the groundwork for this utilitarian pedagogy, which was further developed by Johann Heinrich Pestalozzi (1746–1827) and the proponents of the German Arbeitsschule model. As health issues became more prominent among workers, gymnastics also acquired a prophylactic role. This trend is exemplified by Pehr Henrik Ling, (Note: Ulmann 1977, pp. 302–314) whose work contributed to the development of modern physiotherapy. From the late 18th century, gymnastics evolved in three main European contexts: in Sweden with Ling, in the German-speaking world with GutsMuths (1759–1839) and Jahn (1772–1852), (Note: Ulmann 1977, pp. 285–290) and in Switzerland with Pestalozzi. It later expanded into the Austro-Hungarian Empire with Miroslav Tyrš (1832–1884) and the Sokol movement. These approaches emphasized general physical activity, often with military or hygienic objectives.

=== French gymnastics ===
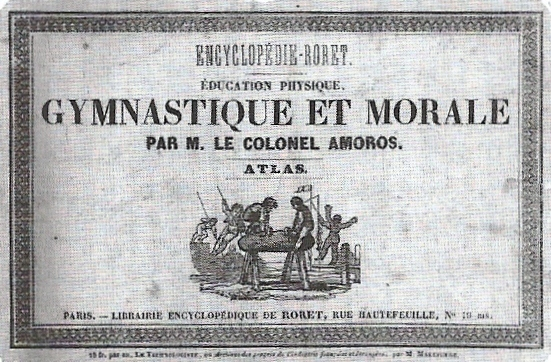
Gymnastics book from 1830.

Gymnastics was introduced in France at the beginning of the Second Restoration through Francisco Amoros. (Note: Barrull 1984, p. 123) It subsequently developed rapidly in both military and civilian contexts, with the establishment of private and school gymnasiums. These gymnasiums also served as venues for urban intellectuals (Note: Piard 2001, pp. 101–102) and socio-political discussions. A military normal gymnasium was founded in 1852. (Note: Barrull 1984, p. 124) In 1867, Victor Duruy, Minister of Public Instruction, commissioned a study mission on gymnastics in Belgium and German-speaking countries, led by Dr. Hillairet. The resulting Hillairet Report, published on February 15, 1868, identified deficiencies in French gymnastics instruction and included a list of gymnastics instructors in France. Following this, a decree on March 12, 1869, established the Certificate of Aptitude for Gymnastics Teaching (CAEG). (Note: This diploma, which the Third Republic soon made compulsory for teaching gymnastics in high schools and colleges, is the forerunner of today’s Certificat d’aptitude au professorat d’éducation physique et sportive (CAPEPS).) In the associative sphere, Alsace under the Second Empire became a center for gymnastics experimentation, influencing the broader gymnastics movement of the Third Republic. The first gymnastics festival in France was organized by Jean-Jacques Ziegler on May 12, 1861, in Guebwiller, (Note: Barrull 1984, p. 147) followed by festivals in Colmar in 1867 and Strasbourg in 1869.

=== Sport ===
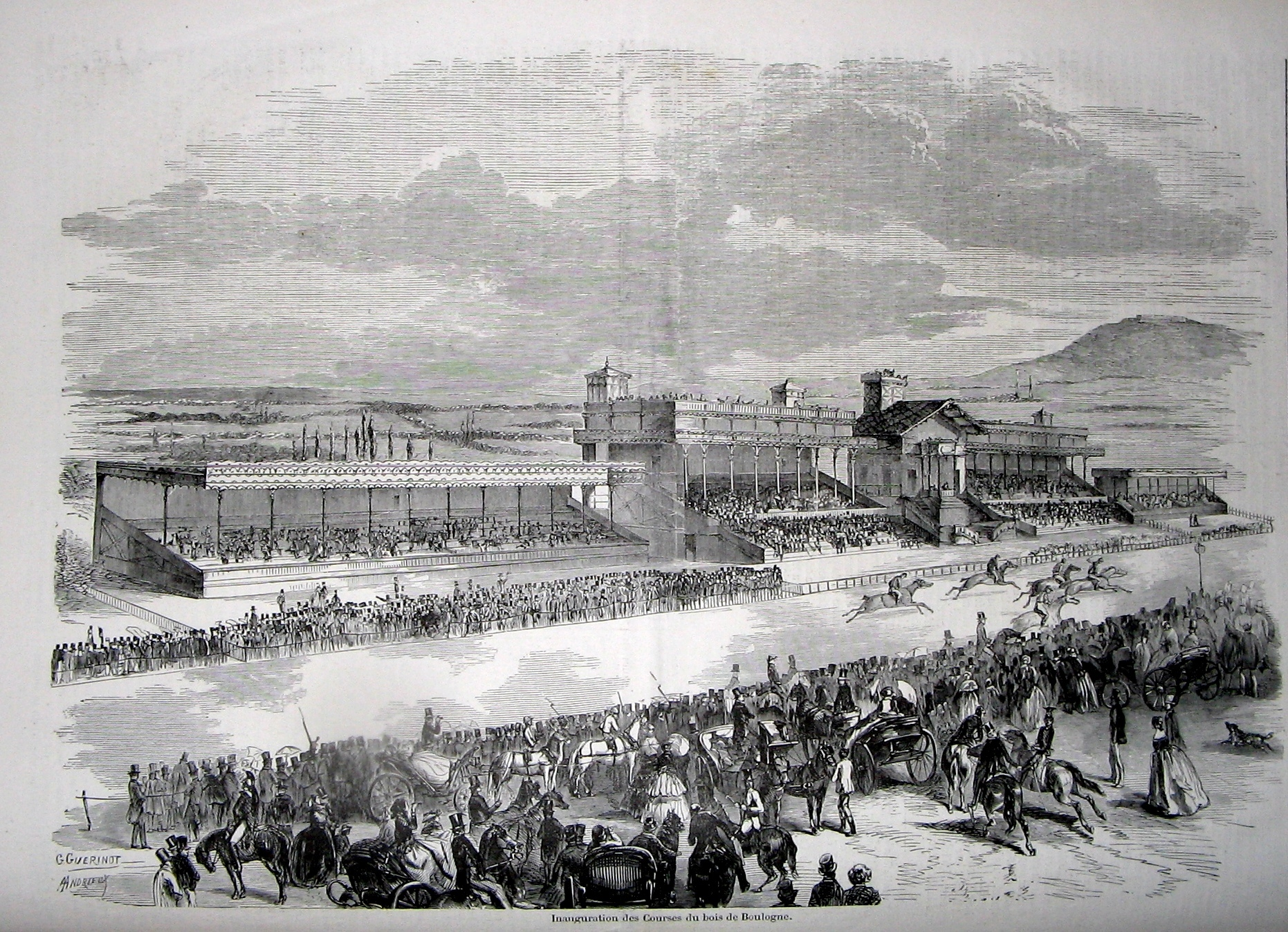
Horse racing at Bois de Boulogne (Longchamp racecourse).

The French Revolution, influenced by Jean-Jacques Rousseau, supported sport and organized the Olympiads of the Republic in Paris in 1796, 1797, and 1798. These events featured the first athletic time measurements and the introduction of the metric system in sports competitions. However, the wars of the Revolution and those of Napoleon I delayed the implementation of many educational reforms, including those outlined in the Bouquier Decree of December 1793. Efforts during the Restoration and the Second Empire were also insufficient. The 1868 Hillairet Report observed that students had largely ceased playing during recess, which was spent walking and conversing, particularly among upper-class students, limiting relief from intellectual work. Intellectuals openly supporting sport remained rare until the late 20th century. (Note: For example, Albert Camus.) Nevertheless, some institutions, especially those run by Dominicans such as Sorèze and Arcueil, maintained significant sports facilities and organized annual Olympic Games, as exemplified by the Rondeau seminary in Grenoble.

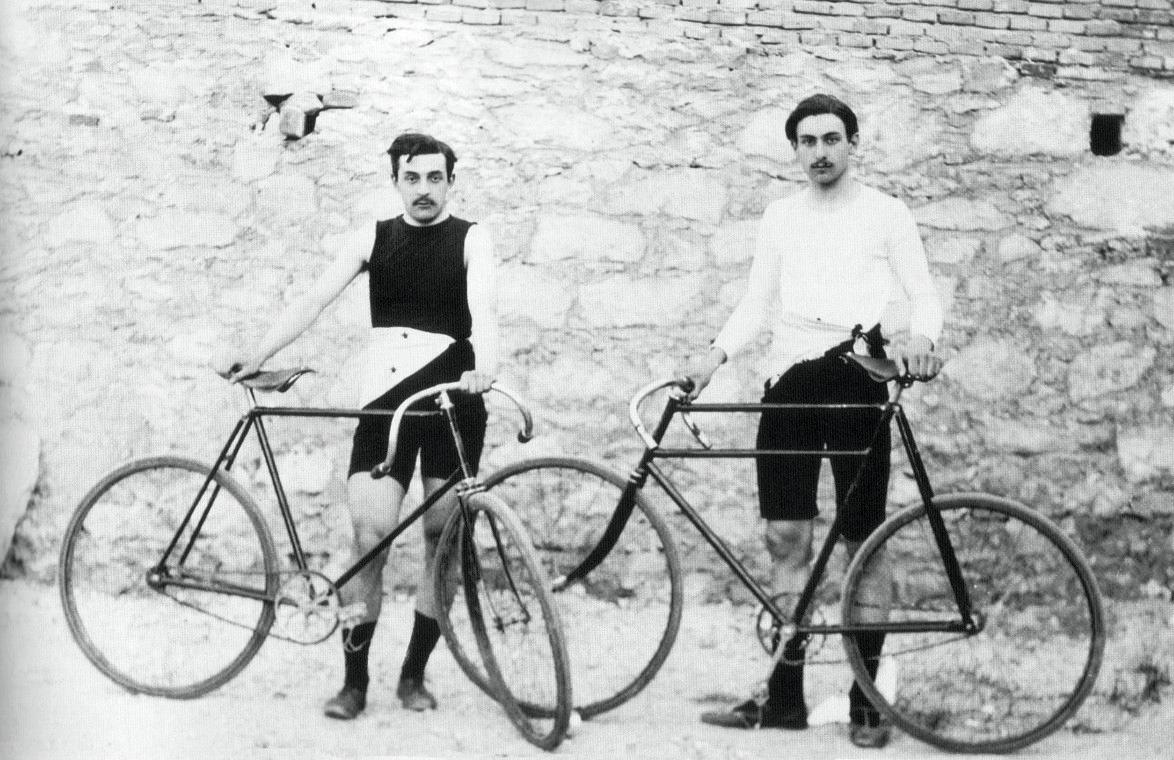
Two French participants in the 1896 Games.

Horse racing has had dedicated press coverage in France since the 1820s, with major races established in the 19th century, including the Prix du Jockey Club (1836), the Prix de Diane (1843), and the Grand Steeple-Chase de Paris (1874). Horse racing was the dominant national sport until the rise of cycling, which gained popularity and media support by the end of the century. Since the 1830s, professional rowing competitions were held on the Seine, and footraces offered cash prizes as early as 1853. Professionalism, a practice dating back to ancient Greece and Rome, was integral to French sport until the mid-1880s, when Georges de Saint-Clair and Ernest Demay promoted the "purification" of athletics, resulting in a ban on betting on athletic races.

== Third Republic (1870–1919) ==
The law on associations of July 1, 1901, defined associations as “the agreement by which two or more persons permanently pool their knowledge or activities for a purpose other than sharing profits.” This framework recognized the role of gymnastic and sports associations in the nation's development and facilitated their growth.

=== Union of French gymnastics societies ===
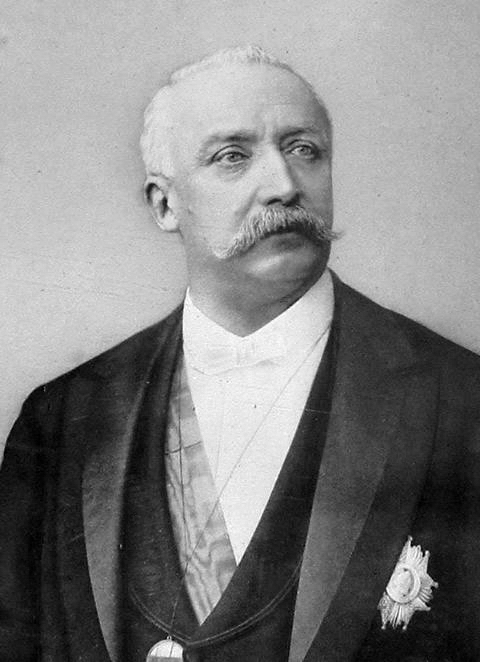
Félix Faure, president of the USGF (1880) and of the Republic (1895–1899).

The defeat of 1870 made gymnastics a national priority, engaging the political sphere. Eugène Paz, (Note: Barrull 1984, p. 159) a professor at the École normale in Auteuil and manager of a Paris gymnasium, founded the Union of Gymnastics Societies of France (USGF) on September 28, 1873. By 1875, the USGF included 250 associations and organized the first Festival of National Regeneration, presided over by Jules Simon. (Note: Barrull 1984, p. 162) The federal festival was held annually thereafter, with the presidency rotating yearly until 1897. Notable presidents included Félix Faure in 1880 and Joseph Sansbœuf, (Note: Barrull 1984, p. 177) followed by a long tenure by Charles Cazalet. (Note: Barrull 1984, pp. 190–191) Until the early 20th century, the USGF functioned mainly as a think tank, with an executive committee composed of prominent figures from science, politics, literature, and the media. While it focused on organizing annual festivals, it remained cautious about sporting competition. At the 1900 Paris Games, gymnastics and cycling were among the most popular sports and central to physical education under the Third Republic. The USGF (Note: A true "Peaceful avant-garde of the nation in arms," according to Jules Ferry.) inaugurated the Vincennes velodrome with its federal festival on June 3 and 4, 1900, marking its entry into the sporting era and dominance in European competitions until World War I.

=== Union of French athletic sports societies ===
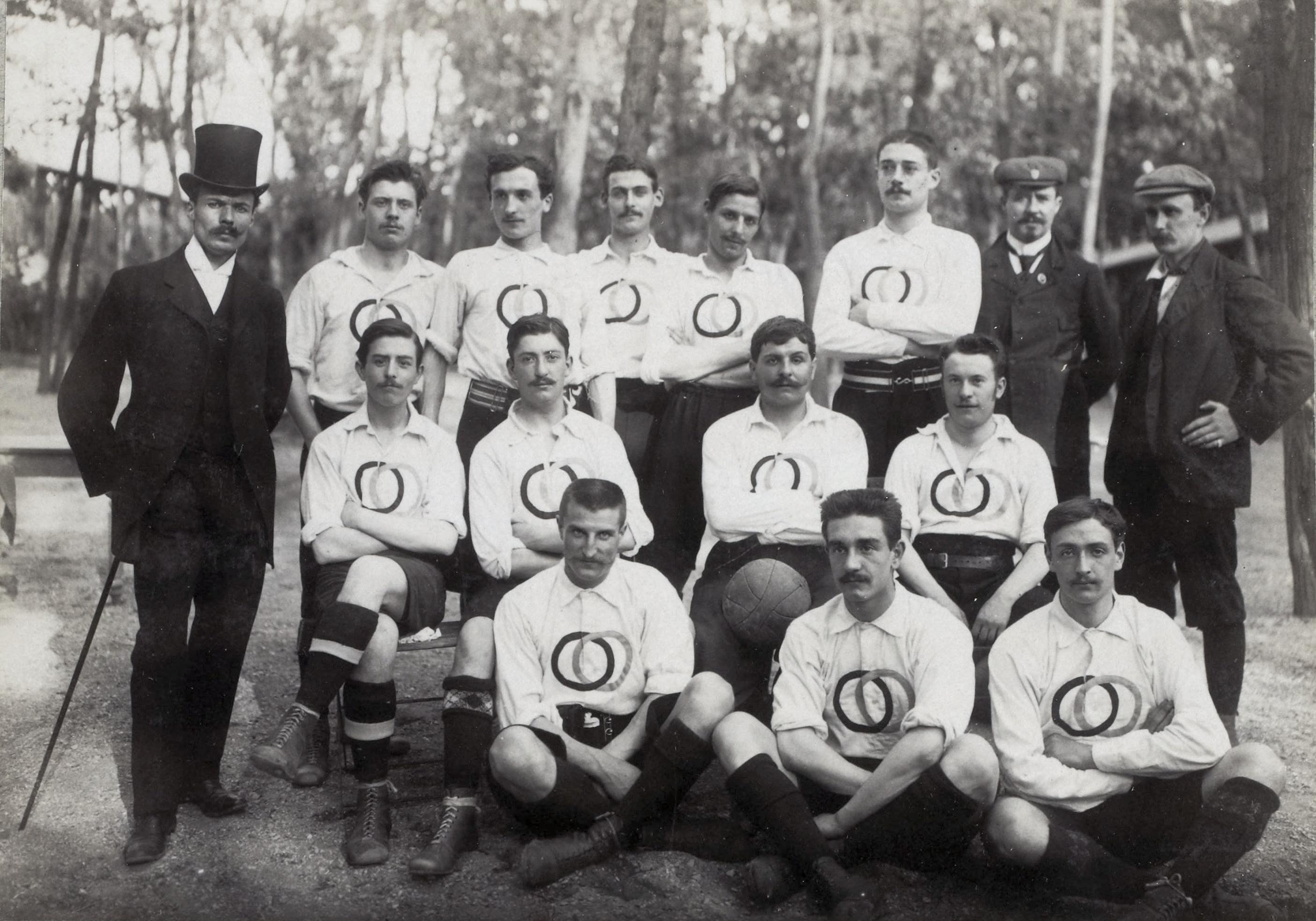
French national soccer team at the Paris Olympics with the USFSA logo.

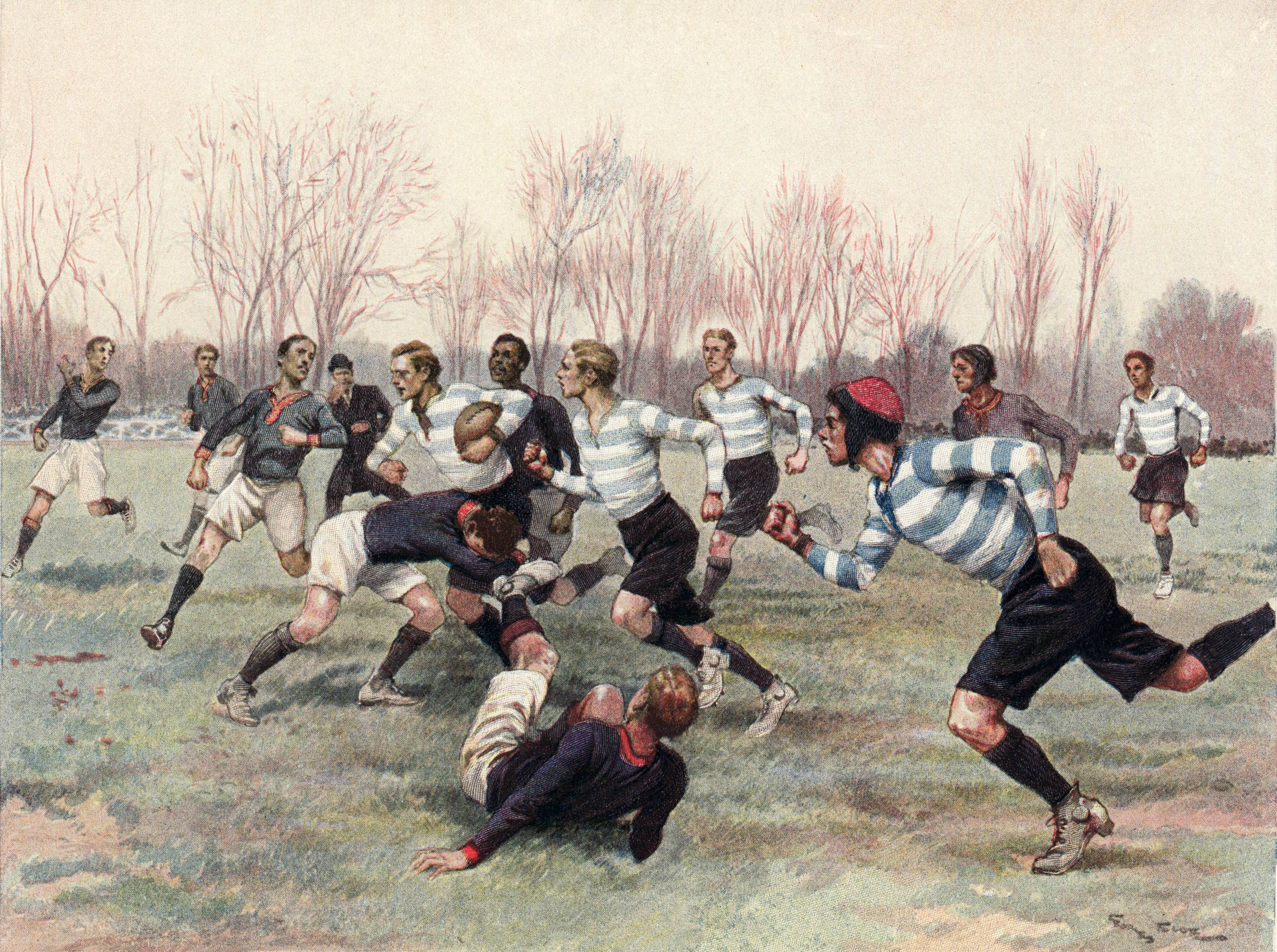
Rugby match between Stade Français and RCF at the end of the 19th century.

The movement to eliminate cash-prize races in French athletics during the mid-1880s led to the formation of the Union of Professional Athletics Societies in Paris, soon followed by a similar federation in swimming. On November 20, 1887, Parisian clubs Racing Club de France and Stade Français, led by Georges de Saint-Clair and younger activists such as Jules Marcadet, Frantz Reichel, Charles Brennus, and later Pierre de Coubertin, founded the Union of French Athletic Sports Societies (USFSA). The USFSA aimed to oppose the professionalization of sport. The USFSA played a key role in founding the Fédération Internationale de Football Association (FIFA) and in reviving the Olympic Games, promoting its model of sport. However, the organization experienced conflicts during the 1900 Paris Olympic Games, particularly with Pierre de Coubertin, and it did not survive World War I. Football in France officially became professional in 1932, followed by rugby league, ice hockey, basketball, handball, volleyball, and eventually rugby union, which had maintained amateurism for about a century. By the early 21st century, women had also achieved professional status in basketball, handball, and volleyball.

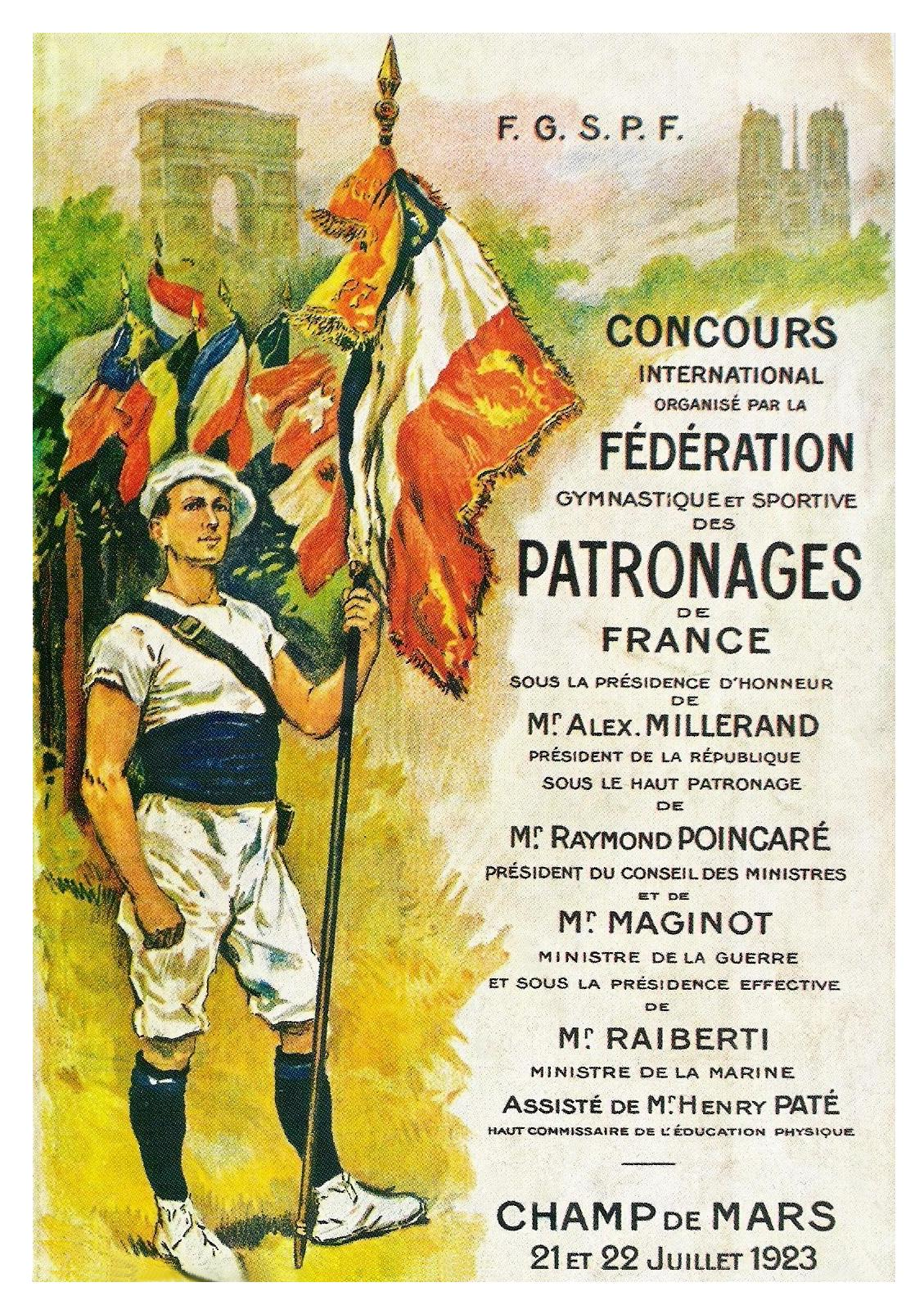
25th anniversary of the FGSPF, Paris 1923.

=== Gymnastic and sports federation of French youth clubs ===
The Gymnastic and Sports Federation of French Patronages (FGSPF) was established in 1898, initially developing slowly, mainly in Paris. Many parish youth clubs it sought to unite were already affiliated with either the USGF or the USFSA at the time. After their significant participation in a Vatican-organized competition in Rome in 1905, these clubs faced sanctions from their original federations and subsequently joined the FGSPF in large numbers. By the eve of World War I, the FGSPF had become the second-largest sports federation in France. While gymnastics and its major competitions helped build the federation's reputation, it also played an important role in football development through Charles Simon, who established the French Interfederal Committee (CFI). The CFI eventually surpassed the USFSA in football and anticipated the creation of the French Football Federation (FFF) as early as 1907.

=== French interfederal committee ===
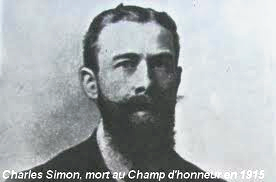
Charles Simon, founder of the CFI.

The French Interfederal Committee (CFI) was founded on March 23, 1907, by Charles Simon, president of Étoile des Deux Lacs and secretary general of the FGSPF. It brought together several regional federations, including the Cycling and Athletic Federation of France (FCAF), the Amateur Athletic Federation (FAA), the Cycling and Athletic Federation of Lyon and the Southeast (FCALSE), the Athletic Federation of the Southwest (FASO), and the FGSPF. The CFI also attracted direct membership from associations, quickly surpassing 400 members. It launched the Trophée de France football competition, open to all, with the first final held on May 9, 1907, in Mérignac. In 1908, after the USFSA resigned from FIFA, the CFI joined the international body, gaining support from football advocates such as Jules Rimet of Red Star, founder of the Football Association League (LFA). By 1913, the USFSA sought membership in FIFA through the CFI. Charles Simon died in battle on June 15, 1915, and was succeeded by Henri Delaunay. The Trophée de France ended in 1915, and from 1917, the Coupe de France was dedicated to Simon's memory. On April 7, 1919, the French Football Federation (FFF) was established, with Jules Rimet as its first president and Henri Delaunay as its first secretary general, succeeding the CFI.

=== Labor sports movement’s difficult beginnings ===
In 1907, the Socialist Party Sports Union (USPS) was founded by Abraham Kleynhoff, a journalist for L’Humanité. By the end of 1908, a national organization emerged under the name Socialist Sports and Athletic Federation. It was affiliated with the International Association for Socialist Physical Education, established in 1913, and later renamed the Socialist Federation of Sports and Gymnastics. In 1919, it became the Federation of Labor Sports (FST). Despite these developments, sport within large industrial groups mainly remained under employer control and affiliated with established federations or regional organizations. Compared to similar movements in Central Europe, the French workers’ sports movement experienced limited growth until the Popular Front era.

=== Contradictions of the sports movement ===
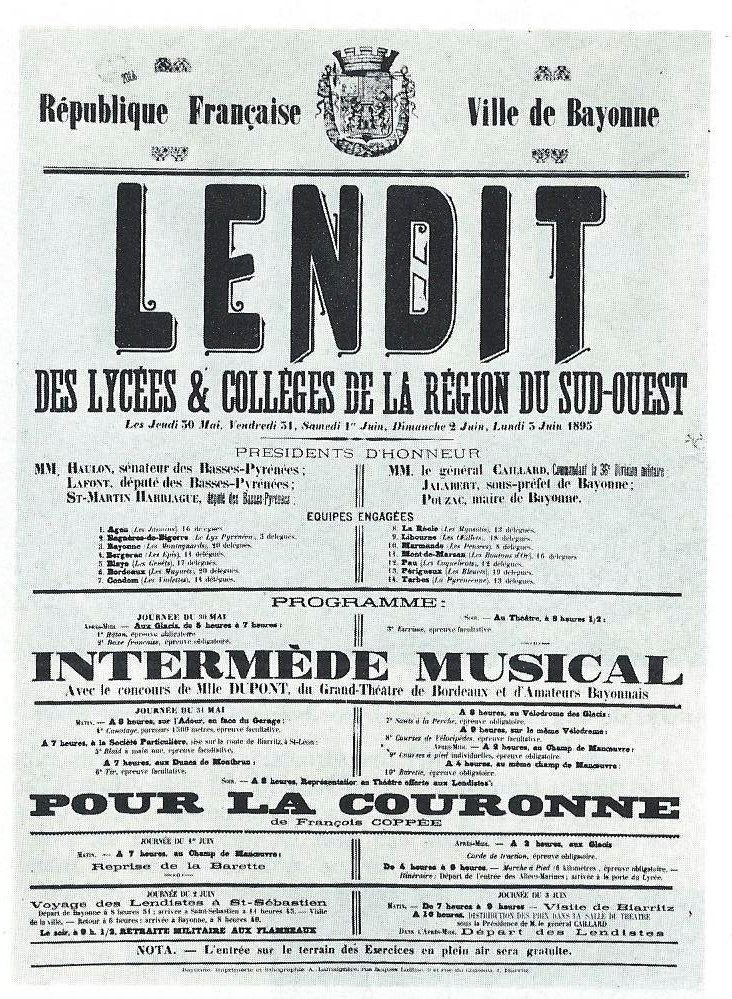
Poster advertising a lendit in Bayonne (1895).

During the early development of sport in the Third Republic, political divisions were evident. This was exemplified by the antagonism between Pierre de Coubertin and Paschal Grousset, illustrated by de Coubertin's statement: “Monsieur Paschal Grousset is a man I despise and with whom I want no relations.” The period also saw differing views between proponents of educational values through competition and hygienist doctors, who were cautious about women's participation in sports. Additionally, sport faced challenges in establishing itself within schools, where gymnastics was already well established.

Pierre de Coubertin, secretary general of the USFSA, promoted sport and competition in schools, positioning himself in opposition to supporters of military and hygienist gymnastics, officially endorsed by Paul Bert and others, as well as to advocates of egalitarian physical education led by Paschal Grousset, a former Communard and deportee. To advance physical activity and sport in schools, Coubertin founded the Propaganda Committee for Physical Exercises in June 1888 and expanded it in 1890 with the Revue athlétique. The committee was largely composed of right-wing members, including monarchists, conservatives, and clerics, whereas Grousset's National League for Physical Education attracted figures with radical republican and atheist views, such as Georges Clemenceau and Alexandre Dumas. This division reflected broader conflicts between a liberal, individualist movement and an egalitarian, collective approach to physical education.

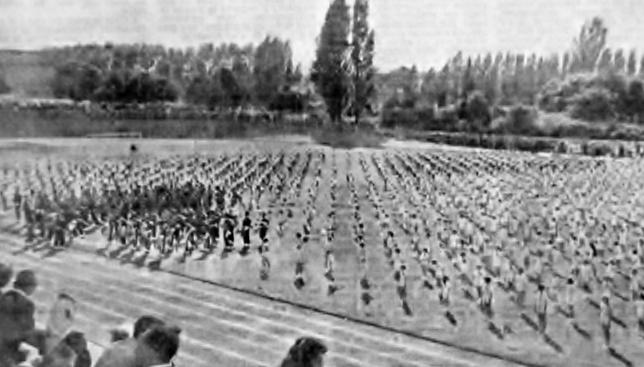
School lending at the beginning of the 20th century.

The Girondine League of Physical Education, founded by Philippe Tissié, sought to remain independent from the major currents in the sports world. As a physician and hygienist, Tissié opposed competition and its associated violence, while Pierre de Coubertin defended sport and its "freedom of excess" as a path to individual excellence. Coubertin promoted an international vision of sport and aimed to connect sports leagues globally, favoring English sports such as football, athletics, canoeing, and tennis. In contrast, Tissié and Paschal Grousset supported a more localized sports education focused on regional games (like the Barrette of Aquitaine rather than rugby) and the Swedish method. Tissié showed limited interest in the Olympic Games, stating that "questions of amateurs and professionals as well as the restoration of the Olympic Games do not directly concern the Girondine League, which only deals with school-aged youth."

Philippe Tissié participated in the 1897 Olympic Congress in Le Havre as a delegate of the Minister of Public Instruction. He supported the fraternal values represented by the Olympic Games and defended his views, which were carefully considered despite Pierre de Coubertin's reservations. Coubertin maintained contact with Tissié “to work on this same cause…”—the promotion of physical education, acknowledging that “…even if we do not serve it in the same way, we love it equally.” Despite their differences, a significant correspondence between Coubertin and Tissié took place from 1889 to 1915, which Coubertin managed cautiously due to Tissié's official roles.

=== Role of the First World War ===
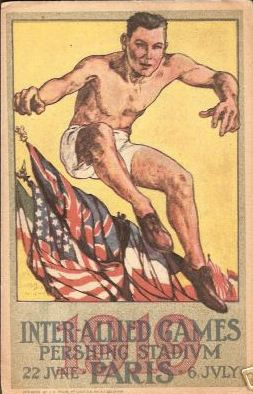
Inter-Allied Games, Pershing Stadium, Paris (1919).

The First World War, characterized by prolonged trench warfare, involved frequent rotations of soldiers between front lines and rear areas. During this time, soldiers—mainly from urban backgrounds—introduced sports such as football, rugby, boxing, and swimming to comrades more familiar with traditional French sports like gymnastics, fencing, and combat sports. This practice was supported by young pedagogical officers and gradually became more widespread. By the end of the war, soldiers formed a large base of sports practitioners. The war's consequences, including injuries and the increased social role of women, also contributed to the development of parasports (Note: Note that the first World Games for the Deaf took place in 1924 at Pershing Stadium in Paris.) and women's sports, highlighted by the first recorded women's football match in France on September 30, 1917.

Many authors emphasize the significance of interactions between young French soldiers and their English and American counterparts in Franco-American soldiers’ homes operated by the Young Men's Christian Association (YMCA). The YMCA's sports department organized the Inter-Allied Games in 1919 and constructed Pershing Stadium on land provided by the French government for this event. This facility, along with temporary structures built in provincial troop camps, contributed to the development of a national infrastructure for athletics, football, and rugby. As a result, sport became a widespread social phenomenon in France beginning in 1919.

== Third Republic and the French State (1919–1945) ==
A relative continuity in sports policy allows these distinct periods to be considered together. In terms of membership and event scale, the two major gymnastic federations—the USGF and the FGSPF—remained the largest sports organizations in France. The FGSPF also played a significant role in the development of other sports, particularly football and basketball. During the Occupation, when freedom of association was suspended, sport became a formal part of the French State's general education system. Although the 1901 law on associations was reinstated after the Liberation, specific regulations effectively placed the sports movement under delegated authority.

=== Single-sport federations ===
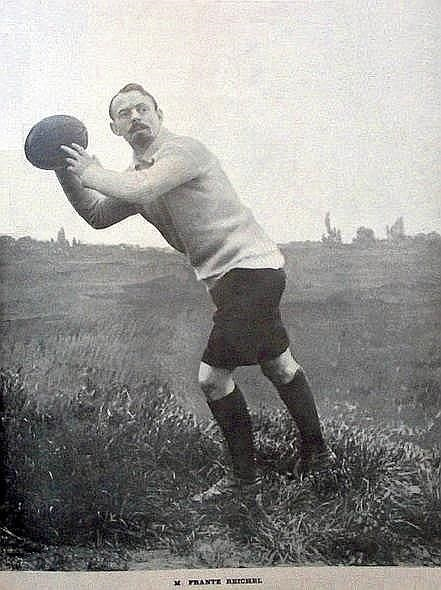
Frantz Reichel and the multi-sport federations.

Immediately after World War I (1919–1920), the USFSA fragmented into several specialized sports federations. The football section was the first to separate with the creation of the French Football Federation (FFF) on April 7, 1919. (Note: Piard 2001, p. 108) The French Field Hockey Federation (FFH) was established in 1920, followed by the official formation of the French Rugby Federation (FFR) on October 11, 1920, with Octave Léry as its first president. The French Athletics Federation (FFA) was founded on November 20, 1920, and the swimming commission of the Union became the French Federation of Swimming and Lifesaving, later the French Swimming Federation (FFN), in 1921. Frantz Reichel played a significant role in these developments. Basketball remained a commission under the FFA until 1932, and the French Volleyball Federation was established shortly before World War II. During the Occupation, some federations faced challenges due to the Vichy government’s condemnation of professionalism.

=== New affinity federations ===
Non-religious affinity federations emerged in the interwar period, notably influenced by the Popular Front’s sports policy under Léo Lagrange. Following the Socialist Party’s split at the 1920 Tours Congress, the Sports Workers Federation (FST) of Montreuil formalized the division between communist and socialist athletes in 1923. The communists, associated with the Communist Youth, retained the name Sports Workers Federation and affiliated with the Red Sport International, established in Moscow in 1921. The socialists created the Union of Workers’ Sports and Gymnastics Societies, aligned with the Socialist Workers’ Sports International. In 1928, the French Union of Secular Physical Education Organizations (UFOLEP) was founded as an offshoot of Jean Macé’s Ligue de l’enseignement. In 1934, the two labor federations affiliated with the Workers’ International and the Socialist International merged to form the Workers’ Sports and Gymnastics Federation (FSGT). The Berlin Olympic Games and the Popular Olympiad in Barcelona highlighted their distinct identities. Like the FGSPF, the FSGT—after excluding its communist leaders at the end of 1939—was required under the Occupation to replace "federation" with "union," becoming the Workers’ Gymnastics and Sports Union. In 1942, UFOLEP was banned, and its premises were requisitioned.

=== Women’s sport ===
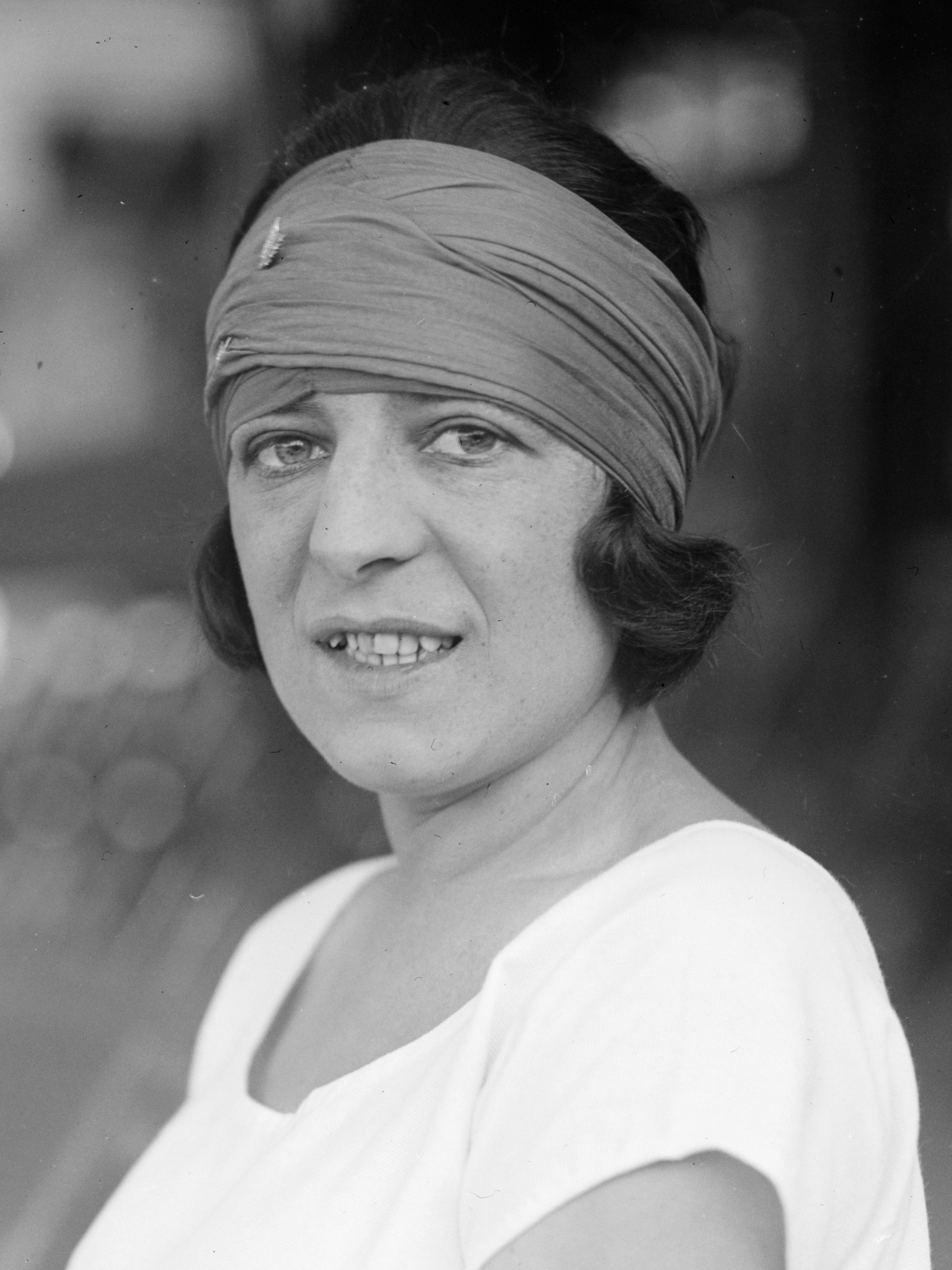
Suzanne Lenglen, icon of the 1920s.

Physical activity among women increased during the 19th century, as reflected by the publication of a women’s gymnastics manual in London in 1820 and shortly after in France with Clias's Callisthenics for Young Girls. The first women’s sports federation in France, the French Union of Women's Gymnastics Societies, was established in 1912. It was followed in 1916 by the Federation of French Women’s Societies of Gymnastics and Sports (FSFFGS) and, later that year, by the French Women’s Federation of Gymnastics and Physical Education (FFFGEP). While women participated in the Paris Olympic Games, the first half of the 20th century saw resistance from sporting, political, and medical authorities toward competitive women’s sports. Despite this, some female athletes gained prominence, including tennis player Suzanne Lenglen in the 1920s and aviators Maryse Bastié and Hélène Boucher, both advocates of feminism. Alice Milliat played a key role in unifying women’s sports efforts, founding the Federation of Women’s Sports Societies of France after World War I. Concurrently, Catholic women’s sport developed, with Marie-Thérèse Eyquem as a notable figure in this movement.

=== French Olympic Committee ===
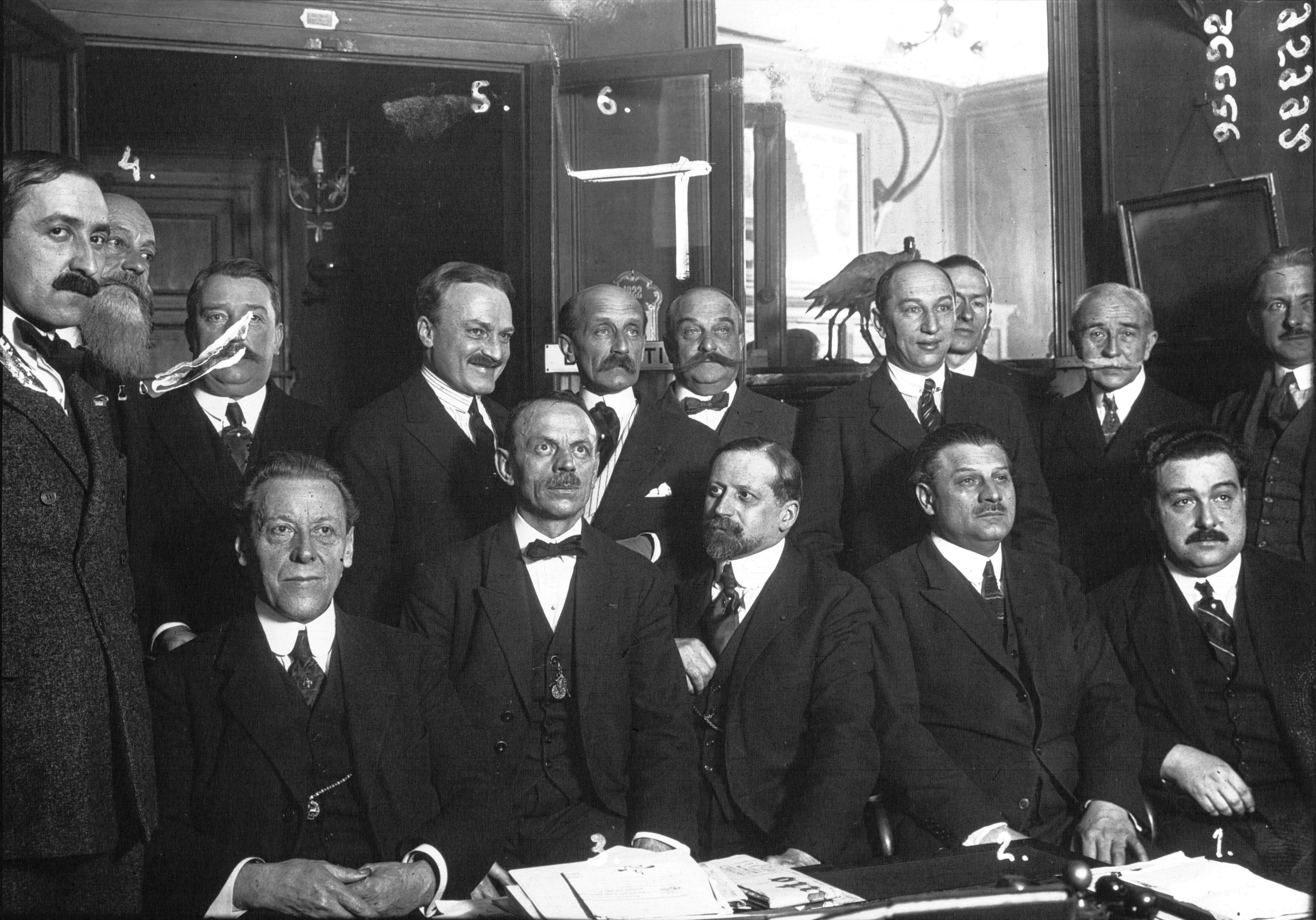
The members of the COF in 1922.

In the autumn of 1894, a group of prominent figures led by Pierre de Coubertin established a national Olympic committee to organize France’s participation in the first modern Olympic Games held in Athens in 1896 and to prepare for the second Olympiad. Félix Faure, then President of the Republic, accepted the honorary presidency. The French Olympic Committee (COF), effectively chaired by Coubertin, remained a loosely structured organization that typically reconvened only as the Olympic Games approached and often had conflicts with the USFSA. In 1913, the COF was integrated into the National Sports Committee (CNS). After World War I, under the presidency of Justinien Clary, the committee supported the successful bid to host the 1924 Paris Games, which Coubertin had hoped to organize before resigning as president of the International Olympic Committee (IOC). Clary also advocated for the establishment of the Winter Olympic Games, which were first held in Chamonix in 1924 alongside the Paris Summer Games. His tenure included managing the admission of women to the 1928 Amsterdam Olympics, overseeing logistics for the 1932 Los Angeles Olympics, and addressing national controversies such as the disqualification of Jules Ladoumègue for professionalism in 1932. In 1933, Armand Massard, an Olympic épée champion from the 1920 Antwerp Games, succeeded Clary and served as president of the COF for six Olympiads. During the 1936 Berlin Games, Prime Minister Léon Blum initially advocated a boycott due to political concerns, but eventually allowed French athletes to participate, aiming to divert public attention from domestic reforms.

=== National sports committee ===
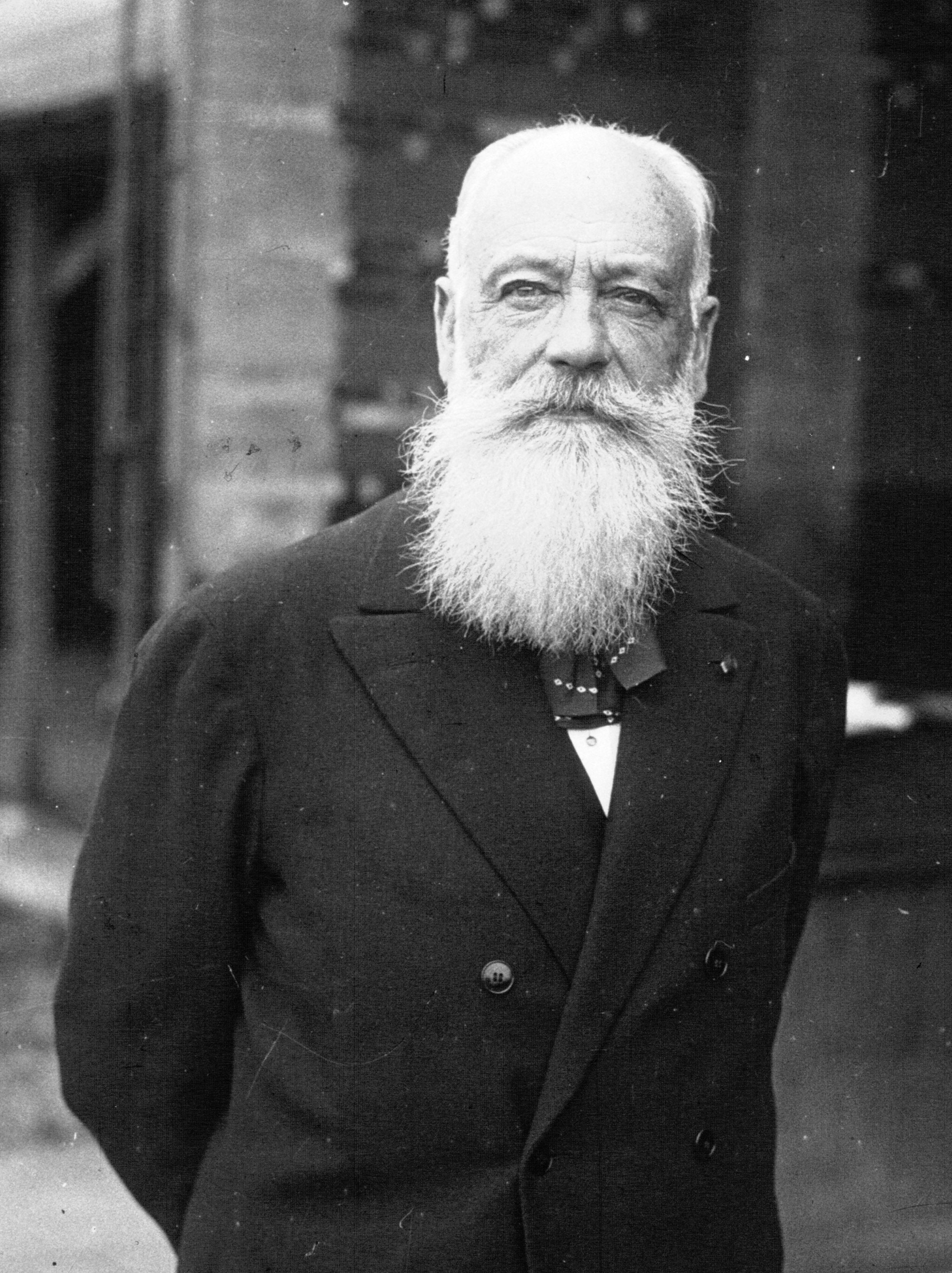
Count Justinien Clary, 12-year president of the CNS and COF.

Founded in late 1887, the USFSA established the National Sports Committee (CNS) on May 23, 1908, through the initiative of Frantz Reichel to represent affiliated sports federations before political authorities. Initially, the rowing, boxing, fencing, cycling federations, and the USFSA joined. In 1912, federations for target shooting, golf, military equestrianism, hunting shooting, ballooning, and the USGF joined, followed by the Alpine Club in 1913. The dissolution of the USFSA in 1919 led to the admission of ten additional federations. By 1913, the French Olympic Committee (COF) was permanently established within the CNS, sharing headquarters and leadership under President Justinien Clary. The CNS was recognized as a public utility in 1922. After the 1924 Paris Games, the COF and CNS each gained separate offices and presidencies, but the COF remained under the CNS, then chaired by Gaston Vidal. Over time, their roles became more distinct: the COF managed logistics and transportation for the French Olympic delegation, while the CNS addressed broader issues affecting all French federations. In 1931, Jules Rimet succeeded Vidal as president, and under the Popular Front, the CNS was renamed the Committee of Physical Education and Sports.

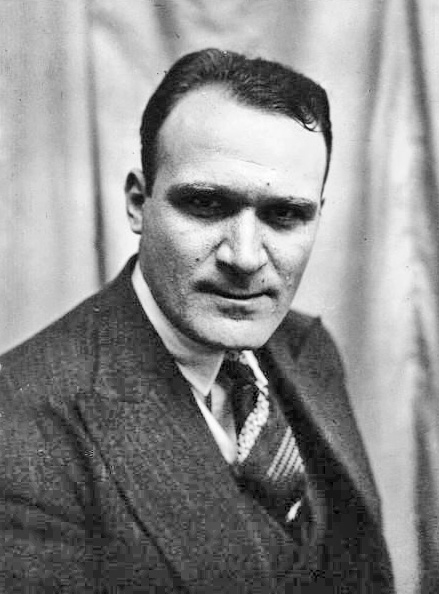
Léo Lagrange under the Popular Front.

=== Public authorities ===
In line with the 1907 commitments of the Sports Union of the Socialist Party to “offer young people healthy and enjoyable leisure,” Léo Lagrange, Under-Secretary of State responsible for sports and leisure at age 36, promoted the development of mass sport. On June 13, 1936, Lagrange stated in Le Figaro: “My general policy, as far as sport is concerned, will be guided by the following classification: spectacular sport and health-improving sport, if I may say so. Health-improving sport will have all my support.” He did not oppose professional sport, saying, “It is not for me to strike down professional sport with the stroke of a pen,” despite left-wing criticism of sports scandals in the 1930s prior to coming to power. Lagrange's policy aimed to address delays in school sports, demilitarize sport, and enhance competitiveness against totalitarian states that controlled their sports systems. The popular sports certificate was introduced in 1937, followed by the establishment of the Office for School and University Sport (OSSU) in 1938.

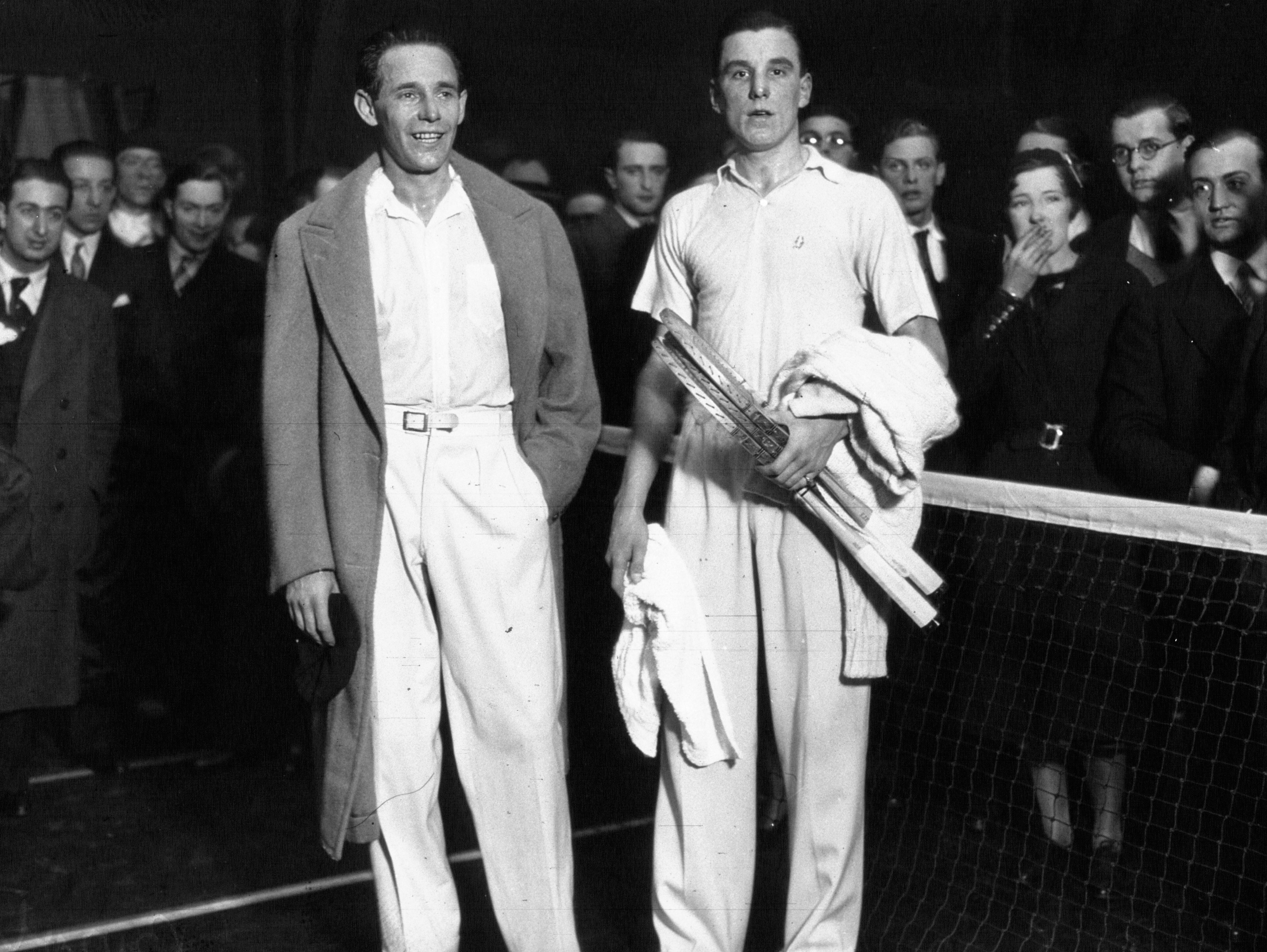
Jean Borotra, on the left.

The Vichy regime's National Revolution reflected similar aspirations for mass sport and a rejection of professional sport, as outlined in the law of December 20, 1940, and the implementing decree of November 19, 1941. This led to the creation of a General and Sports Education (EGS) program, overseen by a General Commissariat initially led by Jean Borotra and, from 1942, by Joseph Pascot. Decisions regarding this program were issued as early as October 4, 1940:

1. abolition of professional sport with immediate effect for tennis, rugby league, and wrestling;
1. a three-year grace period for football, cycling, boxing, and Basque pelota;
1. prohibition of women's competitions in cycling and football, deemed harmful;
1. forced mergers of federations: rugby league with rugby union, badminton, table tennis, real tennis with tennis;
1. later suspension of federations: the French Union of Secular Physical Education Works (UFOLEP) and the Sports Union for Primary Education (USEP);
1. seizure of the assets of banned federations and their transfer to the CNS.

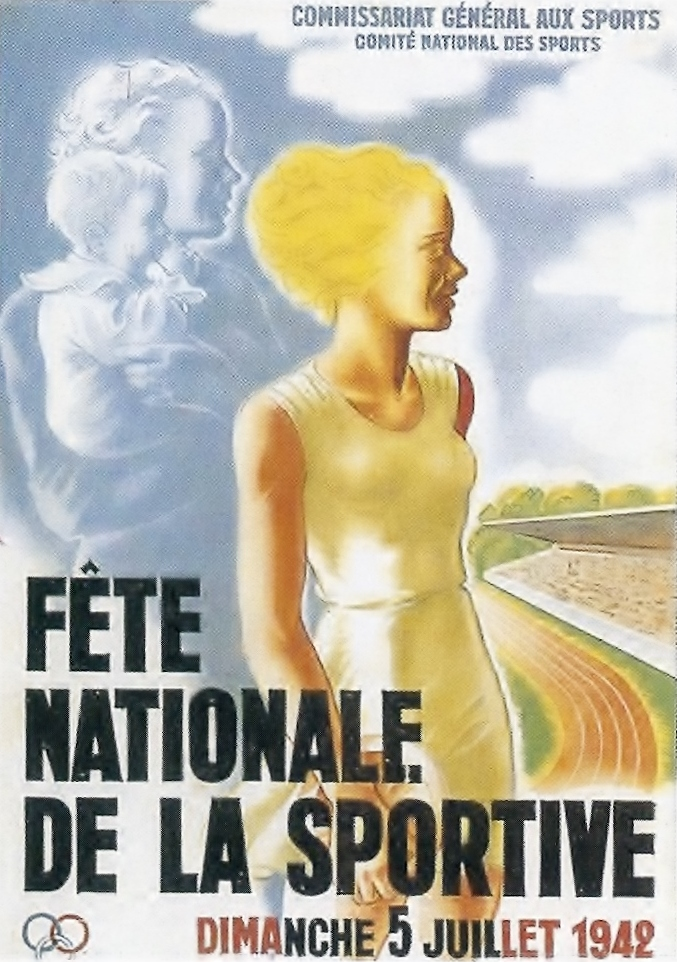
Sportswoman's Day.

Joseph Pascot, who criticized rugby league in a speech at the Toulouse Capitol on October 17, 1940, played a significant role in implementing Vichy sports policies. Marie-Thérèse Eyquem contributed to the recognition of women's sport through events such as the National Women’s Sports Festival. Two ministers symbolized Vichy's sports policy: former tennis player Jean Borotra and former rugby union player Joseph Pascot, also known as Colonel Pascot during the war. Considered insufficiently aligned with German interests, Borotra was arrested on November 22, 1942, after being replaced by Pascot as head of the sports commissariat on April 18, 1942. Pascot, more compliant with German and Vichy directives, abolished professionalism in sport following the 1940 decisions, notably by nationalizing professional football in France. Clubs were prohibited from using professional players, and Pascot established a national championship involving regional selections—the French Football Championship 1943–1944—where players were paid by the sports commissariat. This competition lasted only one season, ending with the Liberation. In response, former professional clubs formed a league at the Liberation to protect their interests.

== Fourth Republic ==
=== Ordinances of 1943 and 1945 ===
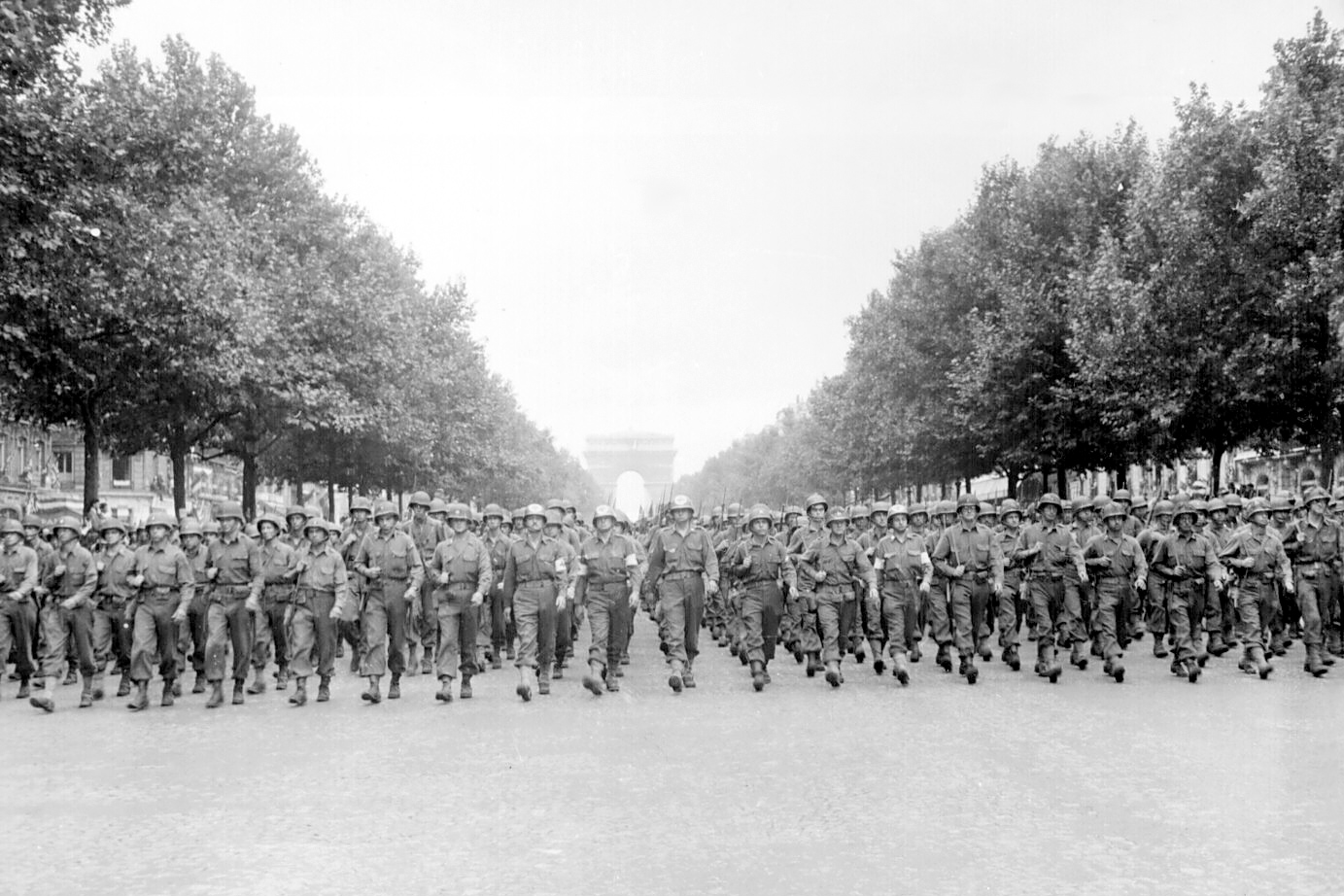
Parade of Allied troops on the Champs-Élysées on August 29, 1944.

The Provisional Government in Algiers restored republican freedoms in liberated territories, including the freedom of association established by the law of July 1, 1901, through an ordinance issued on October 2, 1943. This ordinance introduced the concept of accreditation, allowing prior control of associations. Its application led to the temporary dissolution of the French Handball Federation, (Note: This will not be reinstated until 1952.) created in 1941 under the Sports Charter regime. The Provisional Government of Free France confirmed this ordinance with a new decree issued in Paris on August 28, 1945. (Note: Piard 2001, p. 105) This decree established the state's monopoly over granting national titles and forming national teams, which was delegated to federations required to include specific provisions in their statutes. These concepts of accreditation and delegation defined the postwar relationship between the state and French sport, distinguishing delegated federations from others that retained greater freedom under the 1901 law.

=== Sports orientation of School Physical Education ===
The official 1945 instructions to schoolteachers adhered to the tradition of the French method but allowed for the introduction of sports initiation promoted by theorists from the National Institute of Sports, which also influenced the training of sports personnel. Attempts to restore greater rigor and classicism through the 1959 instructions were largely ineffective, and school physical education became increasingly sport-oriented. Alongside general secondary education—which still involved only about 10% of the population—the organization of physical activities for working-class youth in technical education contributed to the emergence of instructors from working-class sports backgrounds, supporting the expansion of sport among apprentices.

=== Laborious reconstruction of French sport ===
The Liberation ended Vichy-era sports policies, but the State maintained its role in overseeing youth activities during the postwar recovery. Most educators faced few repercussions for their involvement with the previous regime. However, tensions persisted within sports organizations. The Conseil National des Sports (CNS) was weakened due to its association with Vichy, and only preparations for the London Olympic Games provided a common focus for the federations within the Comité Olympique Français (COF). Beyond this, the organizations operated independently, and recovery depended largely on individual efforts.

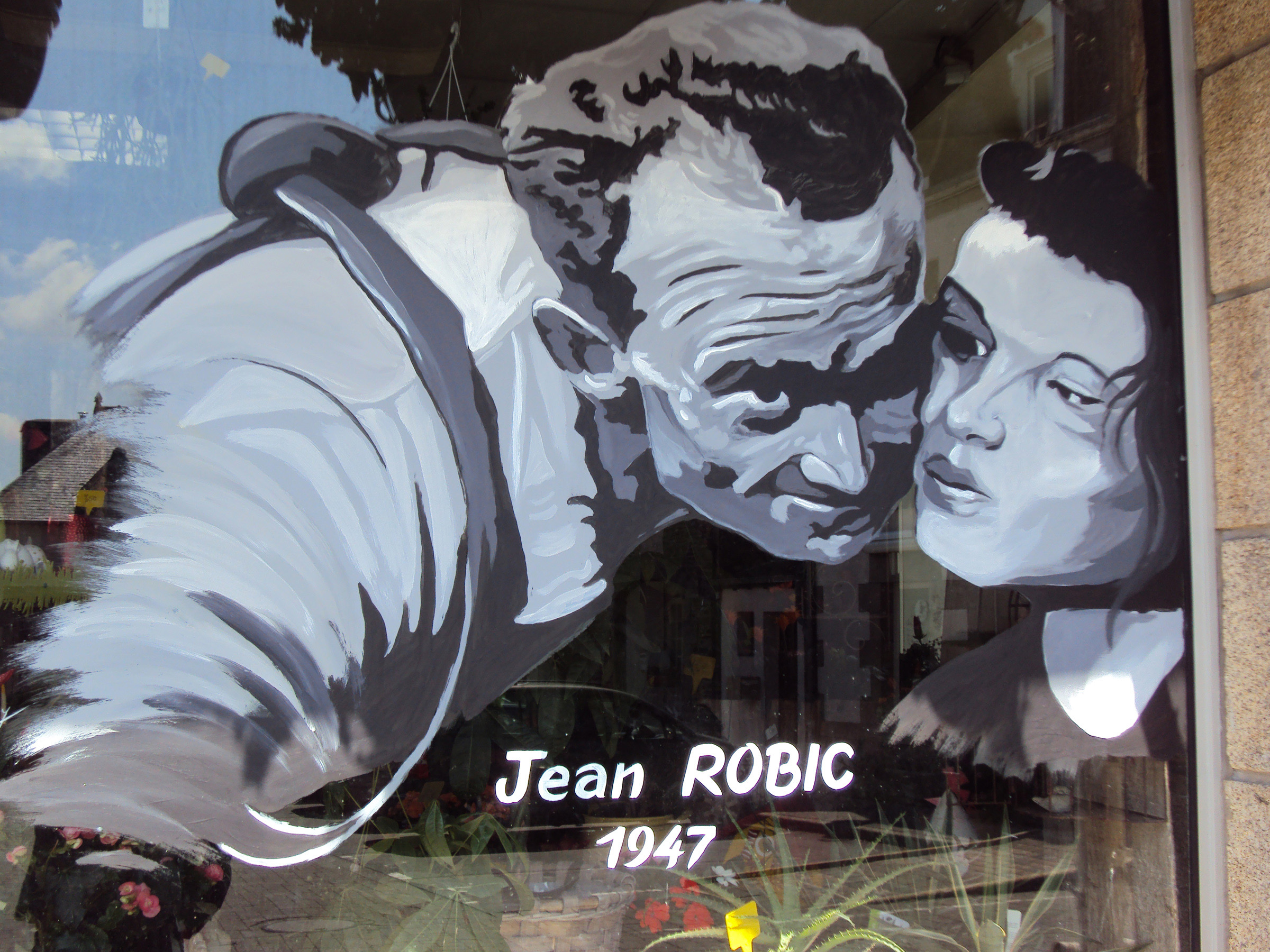
1947 Tour: victory for Jean Robic.

Discontented with the Fédération Française de Football's (FFF) lack of support during the Occupation, professional football clubs established a League at the end of 1944. A power struggle followed between the League and the Federation. The FFF recognized the League in 1945, although it remained under FFF authority. The clubs then formed the "Groupement des clubs autorisés à utiliser des joueurs professionnels" as an association under the 1901 law, registered on March 12, 1946. The French professional football championship resumed its usual format in the 1945–1946 season. Handball, originating from Germany and largely unknown in France before the war except in Alsace-Lorraine, became mandatory in schools in 1941, which aided its spread nationwide despite difficulties in reorganizing a federation. The 1947 Tour de France, won by Jean Robic—the first postwar winner—was widely popular across a country still recovering from war. Sports journalism also recovered after the banning of publications such as L'Auto and Football, which were replaced by L’Équipe and France Football.

Rugby league (rugby à XIII), banned in 1942, regained official status by the end of September 1944. However, having been associated with professional sport and targeted during the Vichy regime, the Ligue Française de Rugby à XIII was required to adopt amateur status by April 1949, operating under the name Fédération Française de Jeu à XIII. The continuation of professional rugby league necessitated the creation of a separate association under the 1901 law, the Ligue de Rugby à XIII, which was not established by the federation's leaders. Consequently, rugby league was officially referred to as Jeu à XIII for 42 years. This change in the federation's status was likely intended to prevent claims for compensation under the law of October 2, 1943. The federation officially regained the name rugby league (rugby à XIII) following rulings by the Paris Court of Appeal in 1991 and the Court of Cassation in 1993. No compensation was awarded for the 1942 expropriation. Despite these challenges, French sport gradually returned to normal operations.

== Fifth Republic and the Modern Era ==
The 1960s marked a turning point for French sport, influencing its distinct development recognized internationally. After the poor performance at the 1960 Rome Olympics, where France won five medals without any gold and ranked 25th, General de Gaulle appointed Maurice Herzog, a renowned mountaineer known for ascending Annapurna, to lead efforts to revitalize French sport. Herzog was uniquely positioned with the financial resources to implement this policy.

=== Reforms of Maurice Herzog ===
A series of three programmatic laws established requirements for sports infrastructure in schools, making it mandatory to include indoor and outdoor sports facilities in new school constructions. These facilities were equipped with substantial resources and made available for amateur sports outside school hours as part of a full employment policy.

The state also developed a specialized technical workforce for sports. The number of technical sports advisors, first introduced in 1958, was significantly increased. From 1962, national technical directors (directeurs techniques nationaux, or DTN), highly qualified experts with authority, were assigned to each delegated federation. Responsible for developing their sports from grassroots to elite levels, they contributed to France's sports advancement. By 1973, there were 19 DTNs, supported by 91 national coaches and 650 regional or departmental technical advisors.

In tandem with the emergence of State personnel, the 1963 law regulating the profession of physical education instructor—and its 1965 application decree, which set the list of recognized qualifications—opened the way to a renewal and greater professionalization of sports supervision. This process was confirmed by the gradual introduction of State diplomas: physical culture and tennis in 1965, followed in 1966 by scuba diving, competitive swimming, horseback riding, figure skating, and football. It continued in subsequent years, culminating on June 15, 1972, in the creation of a three-tier State diploma for each sports specialty.

=== Mazeaud Law ===
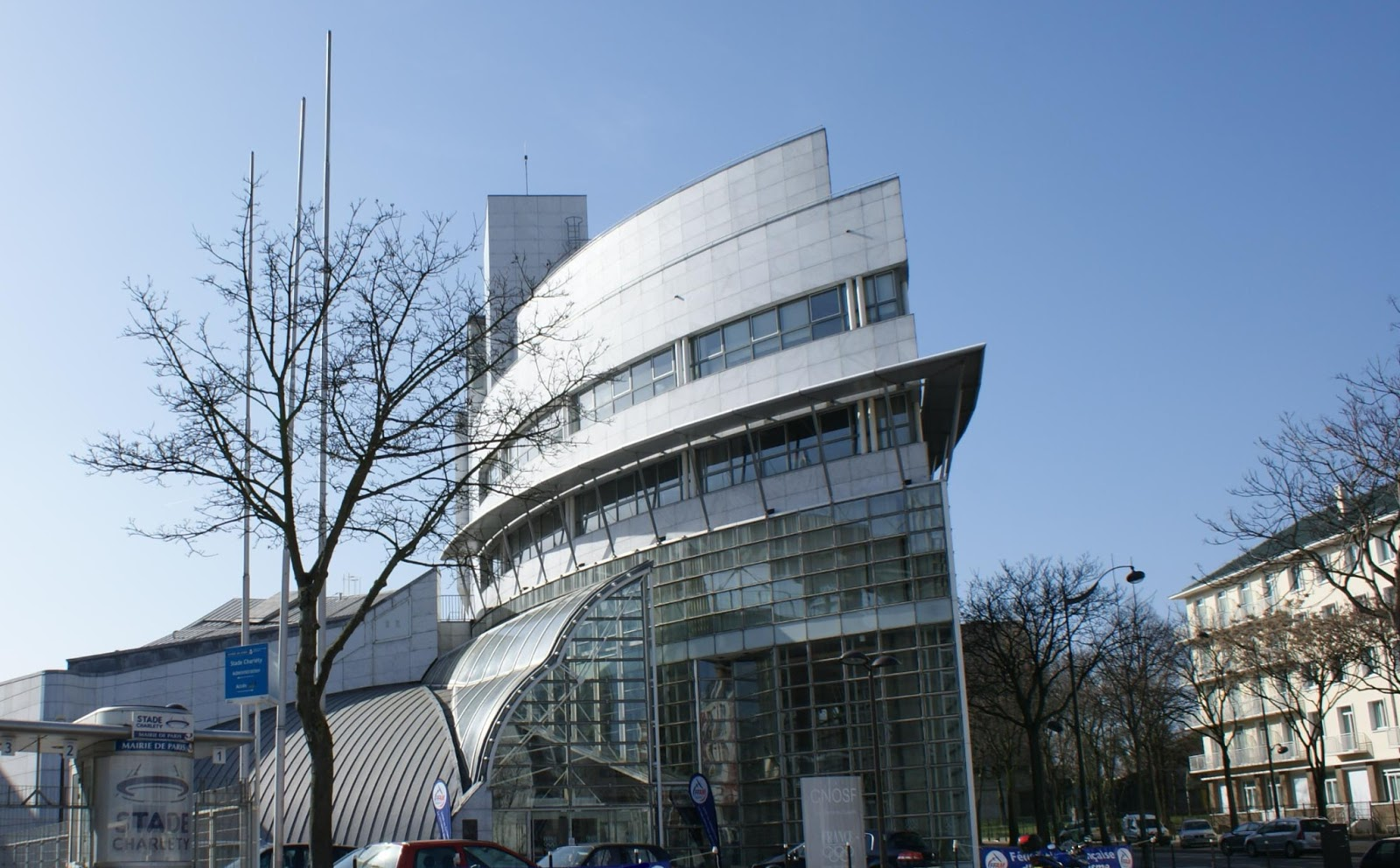
The French Sports House, headquarters of the CNOSF.

In 1975, Pierre Mazeaud, a mountaineer and jurist, finalized a sports orientation law that consolidated previous measures and introduced three key elements. First, it formally recognized the French National Olympic and Sports Committee (Note: Piard 2001, p. 118) (CNOSF), created three years earlier from the merger of the CNS and the COF, along with its regional branches, the Comités Régionaux Olympiques et Sportifs (CROS). Second, it established a national policy for identifying high-level athletes, including the expansion of sport-études programs. Third, it merged the École Normale Supérieure d’Éducation Physique (ENSEPS) and the Institut National des Sports (INS) into the Institut National du Sport et de l’Éducation Physique (INSEP), responsible for preparing elite athletes, training coaches, and conducting research.

=== Avice Law ===
Law No. 84-610 of July 16, 1984, known as the Avice Law, (Note: The Avice Law, named after Minister Delegate for Youth and Sports Edwige Avice in the government of Pierre Mauroy (Socialist Party), is Law No. 84-610 of July 16, 1984, concerning the organization and promotion of physical and sports activities (A.P.S.).) introduced two significant changes to the legal status of French sport. It clarified the professional status of certain sports associations and established, in Article 16, the existence of a public service for physical and sporting activities, with its functions delegated to the sports movement. Previously, delegation of authority was limited to certain federations for issuing national championship titles and managing national teams. The law extended this delegation to all activities of all federations, shifting the sports movement from a free association model to one based on public service delegation. This change was accompanied by efforts to professionalize and regulate sports management.

Subsequent reforms by various ministries further reinforced this transformation. The amending law No. 2000-627 of July 6, 2000, states in its first article: “Accredited sports federations participate in the implementation of public service missions related to the development and democratization of physical and sporting activities.” Unlike the 1975 law, which placed federations on equal footing with the State for national interest missions, they were now recognized as full public service delegates. Their funding became conditional on fulfilling missions outlined in performance contracts. Law No. 2003-708 of August 1, 2003, which clarified the conditions and limits of the sports movement's commercial activities, reaffirmed these principles.

== Evolution of practices ==
=== From generalized practice... ===
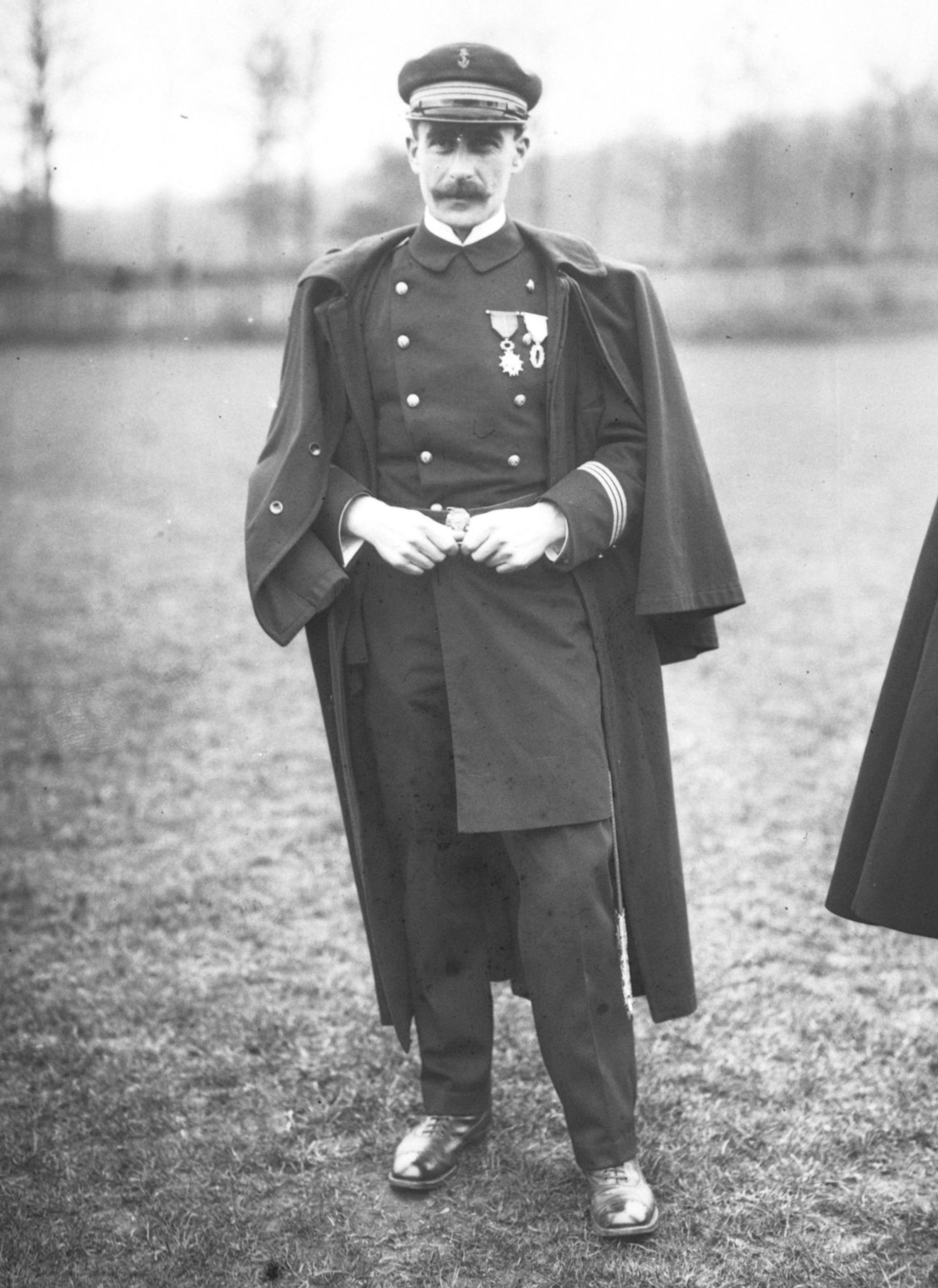
Georges Hébert, advocate of widespread participation in sports.

A historical study of sporting practices cannot be understood solely through the modern sports model. Diverse practices coexisted within each federation. The USFSA and the FGSPF were explicitly multisport organizations, with members often participating in multiple activities, as illustrated by the athletic careers of Frantz Reichel and Pierre de Coubertin. The USGF, which promoted well-rounded physical development, maintained a similar approach for an extended period. (Note: Barrull 1984, p. 188) For example, athletic events common to both continental gymnastics and Anglo-Saxon sports—including swimming—were part of artistic gymnastics world championships until 1954. Until then, champions earned titles through events such as weightlifting or pole vaulting as well as on the horizontal bar. The issue of sports specialization generated significant debate between the world wars, exemplified by Georges Hébert’s 1925 work Le sport contre l’éducation physique, which advocated for non-specialized sports practice. (Note: Paradoxically, her ideas are now often adopted in the field of general physical preparation across many sports disciplines.)

=== … toward sports specialization ===
At the beginning of the 20th century, most sports—except for a few mechanical or combat activities—were managed by the USFSA. Initially limited to Paris, the federation expanded its athletics, rugby, and football championships to the provinces in 1899, later including swimming and field hockey. After World War I, under Gaston Vidal’s presidency (Note: Under-Secretary of State for Technical Education and Physical Education (Ministry of Public Instruction) from January 17, 1921 to March 29, 1924 in the governments of Aristide Briand and Raymond Poincaré, then President of the National Sports Committee from 1925 to 1931.) (1919–1920), the USFSA fragmented into several specialized federations. The French Football Federation was established on April 7, 1919, followed by the French Field Hockey Federation in 1920. On October 11, 1920, the French Rugby Union Federation (FFR) was created as the governing body for rugby union, with Octave Léry as its first president. The French Athletics Federation was founded on November 20, 1920, and in 1921, the swimming section of the USFSA became the French Federation of Swimming and Lifesaving, later known as the French Swimming Federation (FFN). This specialization coincided with a gradual resurgence of professionalism, which had previously been opposed by early USFSA promoters.

=== Sport for all ===
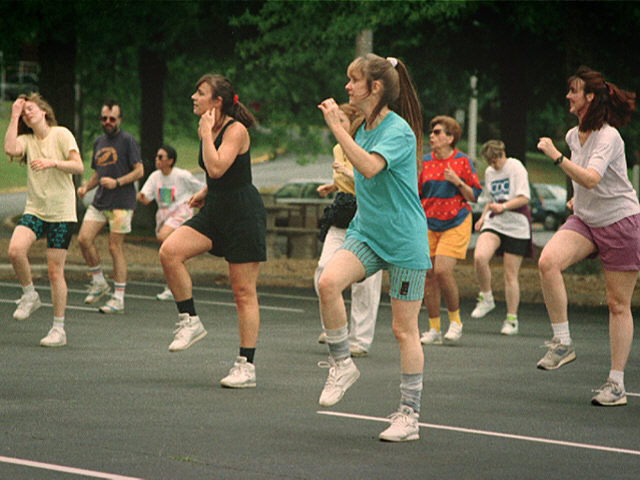
Group aerobics class.

The introduction of paid vacations under the Popular Front expanded access to outdoor activities and winter sports. New affinity-based federations, supporting Léo Lagrange’s sports policy, played a key role in promoting these activities. However, war and postwar reconstruction caused stagnation or decline in this area. Reflecting the sports model of the Federal Republic of Germany and responding to the Council of Europe's encouragement, the National Federation of Municipal Sports Offices (FNOMS) renewed focus on “sport for all” at its 1968 Amiens congress. The creation of the Comité National Olympique et Sportif Français (CNOSF) led the wider sports movement to engage with the issue, organizing initial study sessions in Vichy (February 2–3, 1973) and Châtenay-Malabry (June 16–17, 1973). A subsequent national campaign mainly encouraged informal or commercial activities, such as aerobics and fitness in growing numbers of gyms, rather than strengthening federation-based sports participation.

During this period, many emerging sports sought formal recognition and the establishment of their own federations, particularly when existing organizations were reluctant to incorporate them. This led to the development of competitions designed with spectacle and media coverage in mind, including road races, triathlon, BMX, mountain biking, roller skating, skateboarding, climbing, freestyle skiing, and extreme sports. Several of these disciplines have since been included in the Olympic Games: freestyle skiing (1992), mountain biking (1996), beach volleyball (1996), BMX (2008), and ski cross (2010). The growing popularity of recreational sports prompted the creation of new public infrastructures such as fitness trails, climbing walls, skateparks, and snow parks, alongside a commercial market for sports activities and equipment. Additionally, some organizations managing activities not originally considered physical sports, like the French Chess Federation, have been officially recognized as sports federations by the French state since the early 21st century.

=== Professionalism ===
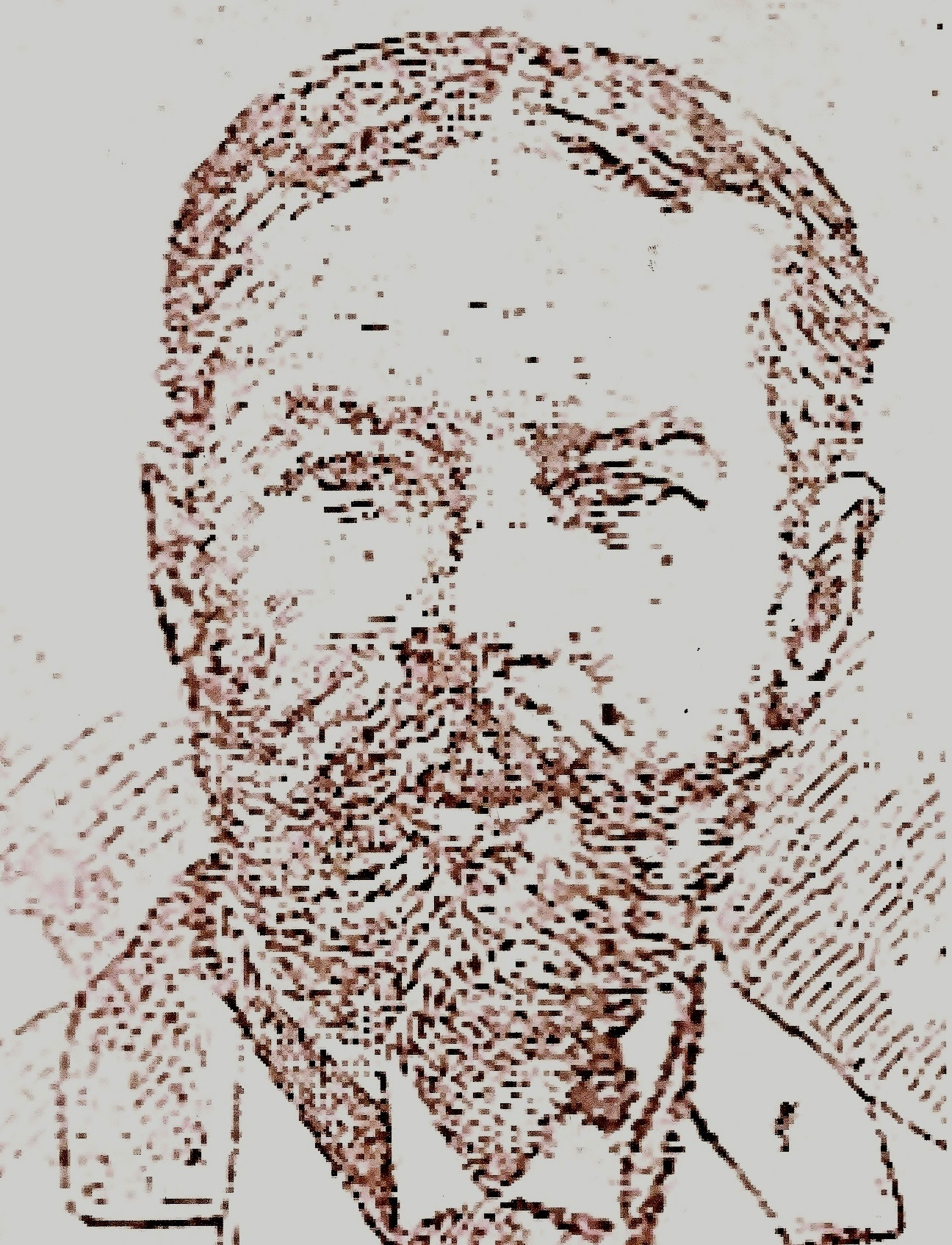
Georges de Saint-Clair, champion of amateurism.

During the first two-thirds of the 19th century, horse racing was the dominant sport in France, attracting large audiences and leading to the establishment of numerous racetracks. Several prestigious races were founded during this period, including the Prix du Jockey Club (1836), the Prix de Diane (1843), and the Grand Steeple-Chase de Paris (1874). By the end of the century, cycling had become the most popular sport, with professional competitions emerging as early as the 1870s and specialized media coverage following. However, horse racing already had dedicated press coverage since the 1820s. Professionalism was present in sports such as jockeying, real tennis, rowing—which held professional championships on the Seine since the 1830s—and footraces, which offered cash prizes from 1853. Professional runners were popularly nicknamed, reflecting their status. Despite this early professionalism, efforts to promote amateurism intensified in the mid-1880s with campaigns led by figures like Georges de Saint-Clair and Ernest Demay, who successfully banned betting on footraces. The conflict between professional and amateur sport persisted in France for decades, with professional sport banned entirely under the Vichy regime. This longstanding debate largely ended in the 1990s with the professionalization of the Olympic Games (1992) and rugby union (1995). Professional status was later adopted by other sports such as handball, basketball, and volleyball, though some disciplines, including women's football, have yet to achieve full professional recognition.

=== Medicalization and doping ===
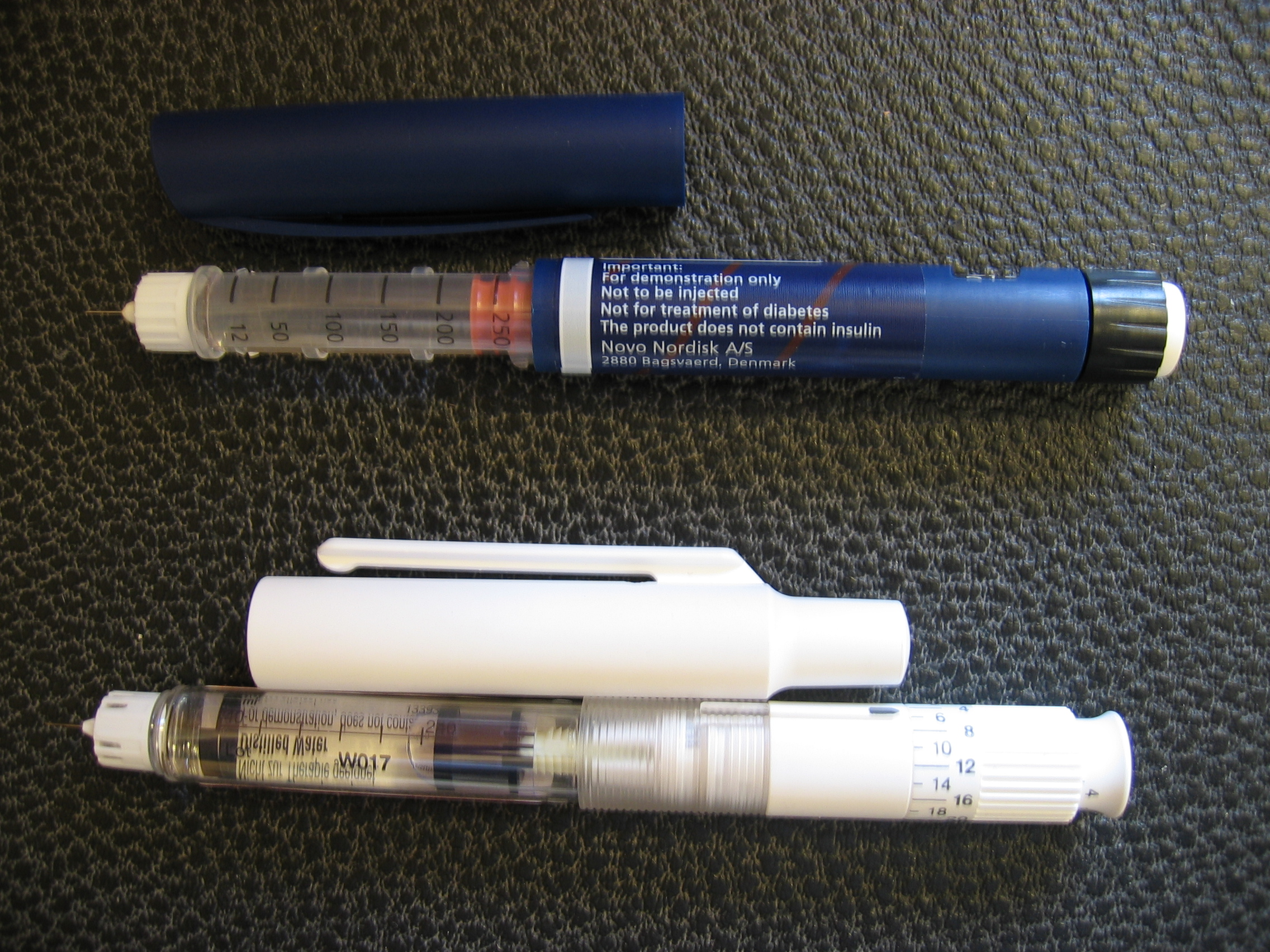
Doping equipment.

Doping in horse racing is a longstanding practice that later extended to early professional human competitions, particularly in various types of races, often using makeshift methods and veterinary products. After the Treaty of Versailles, the biological preparation of athletes became a scientifically studied topic at the Sporthochschule in Leipzig, Germany. This research intensified in preparation for the 1936 Summer Olympic Games in Berlin, where selected athletes of Jewish origin were reportedly used as test subjects. The knowledge gained, disseminated across Europe after 1945, became a significant factor in global sports during the Cold War. (Note: Piard 2001, p. 110) East Germany notably benefited from this research, while a laboratory dedicated to "anthropomaximology" was established at Lomonosov University in Moscow under biologist Vladimir Kuznetsov, who also served as president of the scientific commission of the International Gymnastics Federation (FIG).

By the late 1950s and early 1960s, biological preparation had become professionalized and widespread in some sports. The televised death of Tom Simpson during the 1967 Tour de France increased media attention to doping. In 1968, the International Olympic Committee (IOC) introduced official anti-doping controls and gender verification tests for women at the Summer Olympics. Surprise testing was not implemented until 1989. In response to requests from athletes and the IOC, the World Anti-Doping Code was revised and adopted on November 17, 2007, at a conference in Madrid. The code introduced financial penalties for athletes found guilty of doping, allowing each international or national federation, under Article 10.12, to apply these penalties alongside other sanctions such as suspensions. In France, the national anti-doping laboratory is located in Châtenay-Malabry.

=== Media coverage ===
Horse racing had a dedicated press in France as early as 1828 with the publication of Journal des Haras, followed by cycling in 1869 with Le Vélocipède illustré. By the end of the 19th century, sports coverage began appearing in general newspapers. Pierre de Coubertin founded La Revue Athlétique in 1890, while Le Vélo, launched in 1892, became the first daily multisport newspaper. On October 16, 1900, Henri Desgrange founded L’Auto-Vélo, later renamed L’Auto, which became the leading French sports daily until August 17, 1944. The newspaper notably created the Tour de France in 1903, contributing to its dominance over its competitor Le Vélo. Among L’Auto's contributors was Frantz Reichel, also a journalist for Le Figaro, where he established the sports section, and for Le Sport illustré. Reichel, a prominent all-around athlete, also founded the International Sports Press Association (AIPS), serving as its president from 1924 until his death in 1932.

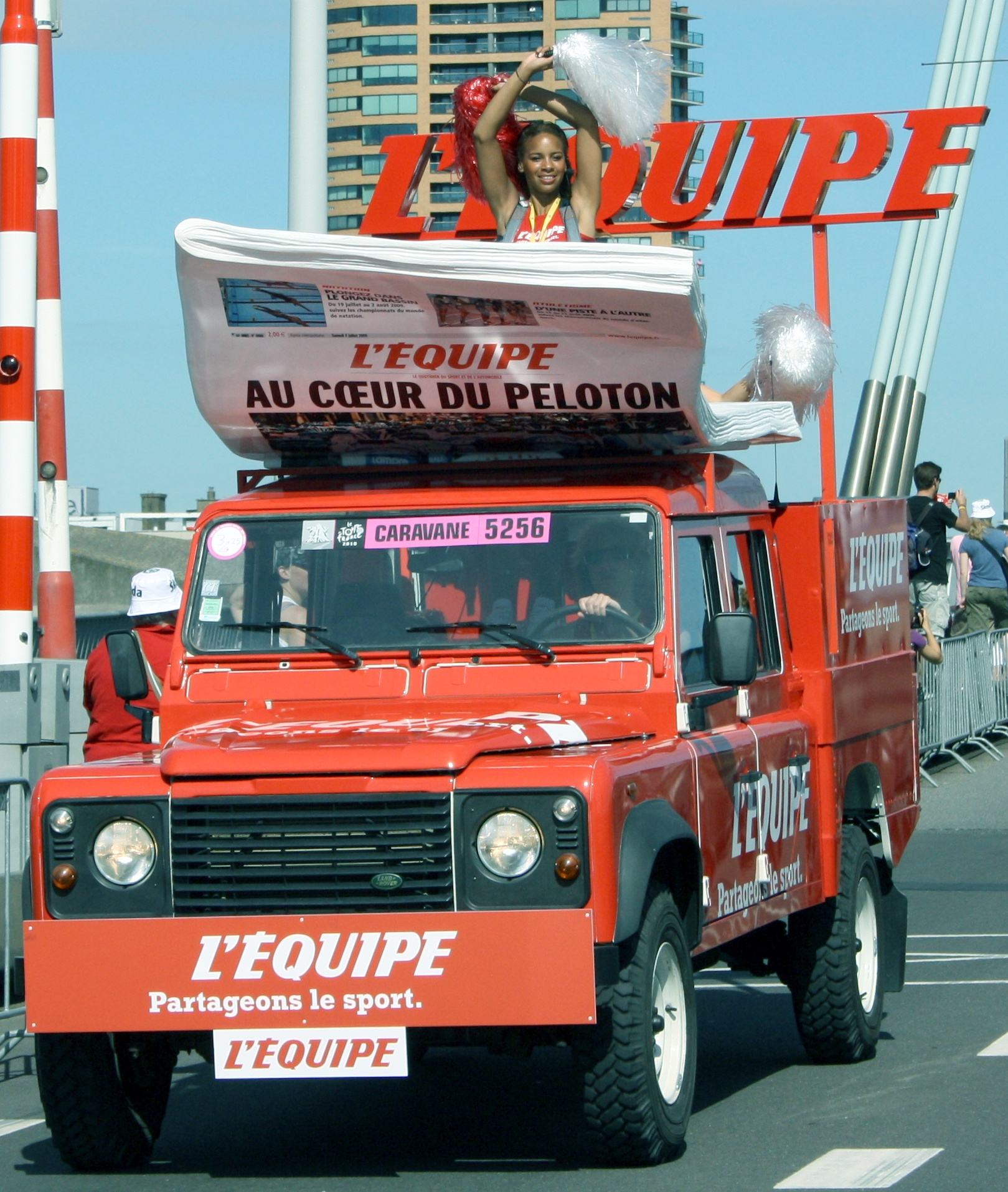
The team on the roads of the Tour de France.

Founded on February 28, 1946, by Jacques Goddet as the successor to L’Auto, the newspaper L’Équipe played a key role in the creation of the European Cup for champion clubs. Renowned sports journalists such as Pierre Chany, Gabriel Hanot, Jacques Marchand, Jacques Ferran, and Marcel Hansenne contributed to its reputation. The publication primarily covers football and motorsports, with other sports receiving increased attention during the Olympic Games. In parallel, most major national and regional newspapers in France developed substantial sports sections, often with regional specializations. For instance, Le Dauphiné Libéré emphasizes coverage of mountain sports and cycling, while Ouest-France and Sud Ouest focus heavily on sailing.

L'Équipe, a subsidiary of the Amaury Group, has operated a 24-hour sports news channel, L'Équipe TV, since 1998. (Note: Renamed L'Équipe 21 following its transition to digital terrestrial television (DTT) on December 12, 2012.) Television has been the primary medium for sports broadcasting since the 1980s. Football, rugby union, and cycling have historically dominated broadcasts, with tennis and motorsports gaining significant coverage from the early 1980s. The expansion of television channels and the rise of specialized networks have enabled the broadcasting of a diverse range of sports.

=== Sports betting ===
Since the 18th century, sports betting has been closely associated with sport in Anglo-Saxon countries. In the 19th century, Thomas Arnold, a British educator, sought to counter this by emphasizing the educational value of sport, an approach embraced by early 20th-century sports promoters in France. Sports betting faced significant opposition in France during the early 1950s (Note: This reaction is what led to the creation of the French Pierre-de-Coubertin Committee.) but was legalized in the mid-1980s under the leadership of Laurent Fabius, with Alain Calmat as Minister of Youth and Sports. The online gaming regulatory authority ("ARJEL"), established under Article 21 of Law No. 2010-476 of May 12, 2010, regulates the sports betting market in France.

== Stakeholders ==
=== Leaders ===
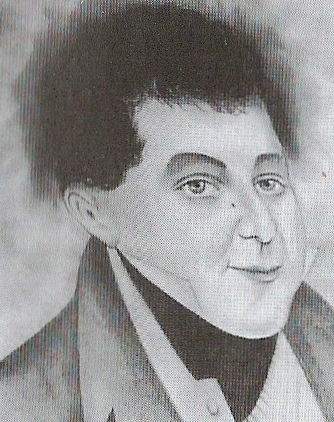
Don Francisco Amoros, the “father” of French gymnastics.

In the early development of physical practices, educators and humanist aristocrats, later joined by politicians, played a key role in promoting these activities to advance educational ideals. Over time, other groups engaged with this phenomenon, which can now be categorized into distinct types. Notable figures, such as Paul Bert, often spanned multiple categories, contributing to both science and politics, while several recent individuals listed under "athletes" also have significant political involvement.

- Humanists: Gymnastics and sport developed in France at the beginning of the 19th century in reference to the work of major German and Anglo-Saxon educators. Francisco Amoros, Eugène Paz, Charles Cazalet are heirs of the former; Georges de Saint-Clair and Pierre de Coubertin of the latter.
- Politicians: From the time of the Restoration, the State became interested in the work of the aforementioned, who often sought its support. But it was truly the Third Republic, with figures like Paschal Grousset, Félix Faure, and Paul Déroulède, that integrated physical practices into national life. Later on, others such as Gaston Vidal, Henry Hébrard de Villeneuve, Jean de Castellane, and Jean de Beaumont maintained this tradition of political interest in sport. In the early 21st century, the attitude of elected officials remains crucial to local sports policy. (Note: Piard 2001, p. 119)
- Scientists: The Third Republic was based on rationalism, so it is not surprising that it quickly entrusted biologists with the task of guiding educators charged with the nation's revival. Sport thus developed under medical supervision. Notable names include Paul Bert, Georges Demenÿ, Fernand Lagrange, Philippe Tissié, and André Latarjet.
- Champions: Those athletes who gravitated around the leadership and were willing were invited, once their careers ended, to take part in the governance and management of sport. This phenomenon was already noticeable in the early 20th century with Frantz Reichel, Armand Massard, and Jean Borotra. It continued into the 21st century with Guy Drut, Jean-François Lamour, Alain Calmat, as well as Maurice Herzog and Pierre Mazeaud.
- Economic actors: These are divided into two subcategories—patrons (such as Melchior de Polignac) and promoters, among whom today we find agents of certain professional and/or high-level athletes. (Note: Piard 2001, p. 120)

=== Technicians ===
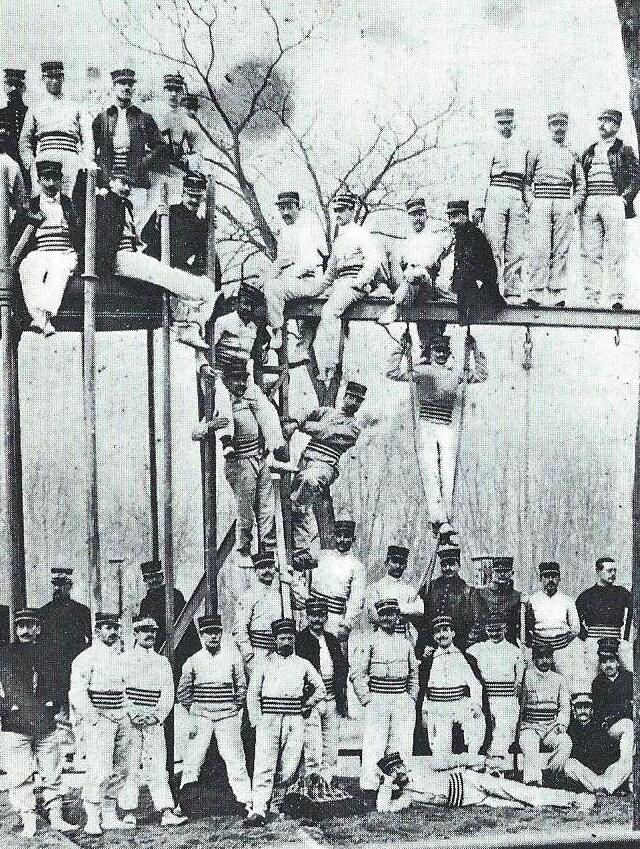
Student trainees in Joinville in the 19th century.

Fencing masters and riding instructors were among the earliest sports educators in France, initially serving as the primary trainers. In the early 19th century, gymnastics emerged, relying heavily on military personnel and Swiss instructors. To address the shortage of qualified instructors, the Military Gymnastics Normal School of Joinville was established on July 15, 1852, at the Faisanderie redoubt to train military gymnastics instructors. By 1872, it was renamed the Joinville Gymnastics and Fencing Normal School, and in 1925, it became the Higher School of Physical Education. In 1927, the USGF initiated its first annual civilian instructor training course in Dinard, marking the start of federal training programs. (Note: Latte 1948, p. 381) Supported by the National Sports Institute from 1945, these programs expanded sports techniques until the introduction of State certifications in the late 1960s. In 1958, a body of technical civil servants, including departmental ("CTD") and regional ("CTR") technical advisors, was established, overseen by a national technical director ("DTN") from 1962 to coordinate administrative, human, and technical aspects of sports. (Note: Piard 2001, p. 114) On August 6, 1963, a law regulated paid sports instruction, with a 1965 decree specifying required qualifications. A three-level State diploma for sports educators was introduced on June 15, 1972, (Note: Piard 2001, p. 121) with subsequent laws clarifying these provisions.

=== Champions ===
French athletes have significantly influenced the global history of various sports. In the early 20th century, gymnasts Joseph Martinez, Marcel Lalu, and Marco Torrès achieved world dominance. In 1934, the French women's basketball team won the world championship, defeating the United States 34–23 on August 11, 1934, at White Hall in London, marking the first such victory for a French women's team. French athletes have since excelled in multiple disciplines, earning accolades such as the Ballon d’Or in football ("Raymond Kopa," "Michel Platini," "Jean-Pierre Papin," "Zinédine Zidane") and Hall of Fame recognition in rugby ("Jean Prat," "Philippe Sella," "André and Guy Boniface," "Serge Blanco," "Lucien Mias") and basketball ("Robert Busnel," "Jacky Chazalon"). The French International Sports Federation annually honors top athletes through the Gloires du sport ceremony, with 287 names (Note: Which can be found in the eponymous article.) inscribed on the Wall of Fame at the CNOSF, prominently featuring athletics, fencing, skiing, and cycling. Notable absences include some multi-time world and Olympic champions with concluded careers. (Note: Among others: Stéphane Diagana and Marie-José Pérec (track and field), Tony Estanguet (canoe-kayak), Pierre Trentin and Jeannie Longo (cycling), Laure Manaudou (swimming), Raphaël Poirée (Nordic skiing), Claude Bergeret and Jean-Philippe Gatien (table tennis), Jean-Pierre Amat (shooting), Sébastien Flute (archery), etc.) Handball, particularly the French men's teams’ dominance from 2008 to 2014, led by the "Barjots," is also noteworthy.

=== Public partners ===
French sport is closely integrated with various systems. Beyond its formal ties to the State (Note: Piard 2001, p. 113) through public service delegation, its connections with local authorities, which own and manage sports facilities, are essential. Municipalities and departmental councils shape sports activities and associations through their policy decisions. The National Federation of Municipal Sports Offices (FNOMS) and the National Association of Elected Sports Officials (ANDES) serve as key intermediaries. Additionally, the National Education system influences sports through its autonomous decisions on Physical and Sports Education, impacting local recruitment and activity choices for associations. Some associations, lacking dedicated sports schools, recruit based on activities offered by school sports programs in nearby institutions. Contracts between these parties are common, and the National Education system supports elite athlete development through sports-study programs within federations.

== Major events ==
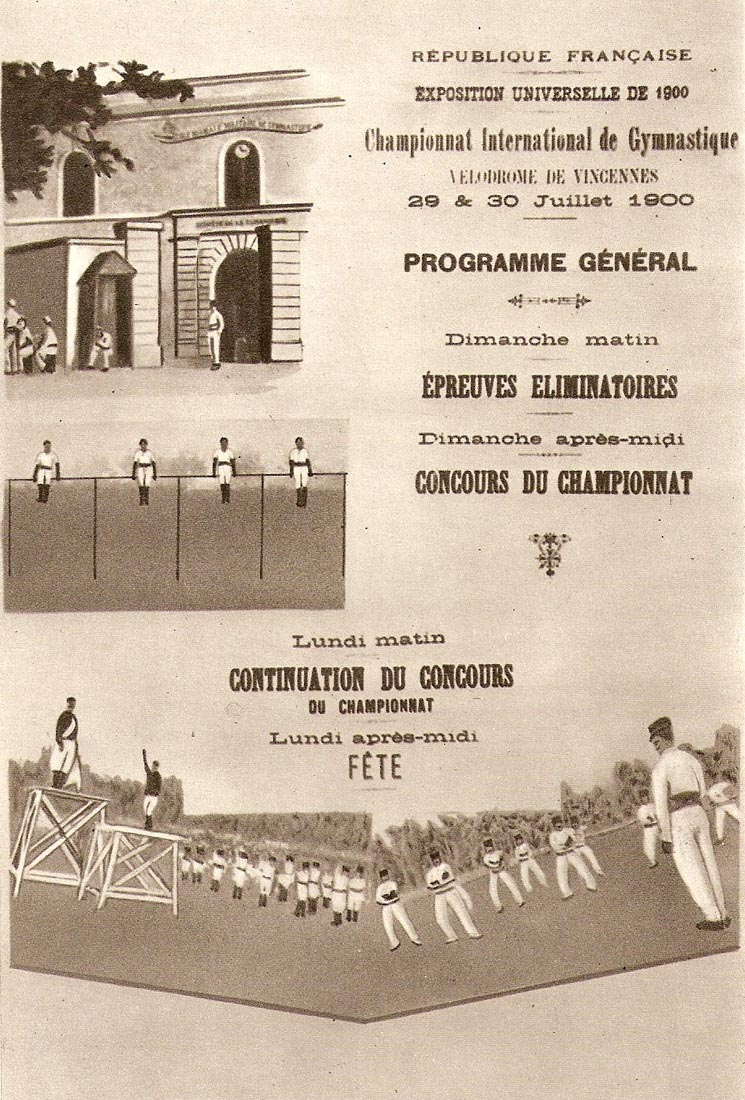
Federal holiday during the World's Fair

In addition to horse racing, which drew significant crowds from the early 19th century, France began hosting various major national and international sporting events.

=== Federal festivals ===
The Festival of National Regeneration, initiated by the USGF on May 16, 1878, under Jules Simon's presidency, established the annual Federal Festival as France's primary national sporting event. In 1889, at the 15th Federal Festival held at the Vincennes Polygon in Paris, Joseph Sansbœuf gathered over 10,000 gymnasts from 830 French and foreign societies in the presence of President Sadi Carnot, strengthening ties between gymnastics and the French state. Subsequent Presidents of the Republic regularly attended the event. (Note: And gymnastics societies are "authorized to march behind the military troops with their music and flags.") The 1900 Paris festival, part of the Olympic Games program, marked the opening of the Vincennes Velodrome. From 1898, the FGSPF organized a comparable annual event. The emergence of the Tour de France in 1903 began to rival these festivals in public attention.

=== Olympic games ===
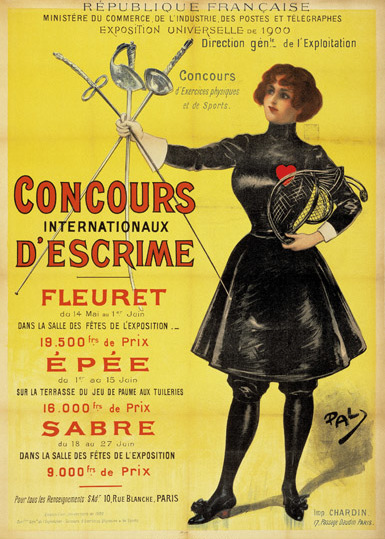
Poster for the 1900 Games in Paris.

The Olympiades de la République, held in Paris in 1796, 1797, and 1798, marked the first use of the metric system in a sporting context. During this period, Esprit-Paul De Laffont-Poulotti advocated for the revival of the Olympic Games, submitting a proposal to the Paris municipal government, which was not adopted. The International Olympic Committee recognized his efforts in 1924. The Olympic Games, revived by Pierre de Coubertin in 1894, were first held in France during the 1900 Paris Universal Exposition. Paris hosted the Summer Olympics again in 1924, the same year Chamonix hosted the inaugural Winter Olympic Games. Subsequent Winter Olympics took place in Grenoble in 1968 and Albertville in 1992. Paris is hosting the Summer Olympic Games for the third time in 2024.

=== Tour de France ===
The Tour de France, established in 1903 by Henri Desgrange and the newspaper L’Auto, is an annual multi-stage cycling race held in France in July. In 2009, it was broadcast by 78 television channels across 170 countries. The event's organizer claims it is the world's largest annual sporting competition.

=== World championships ===
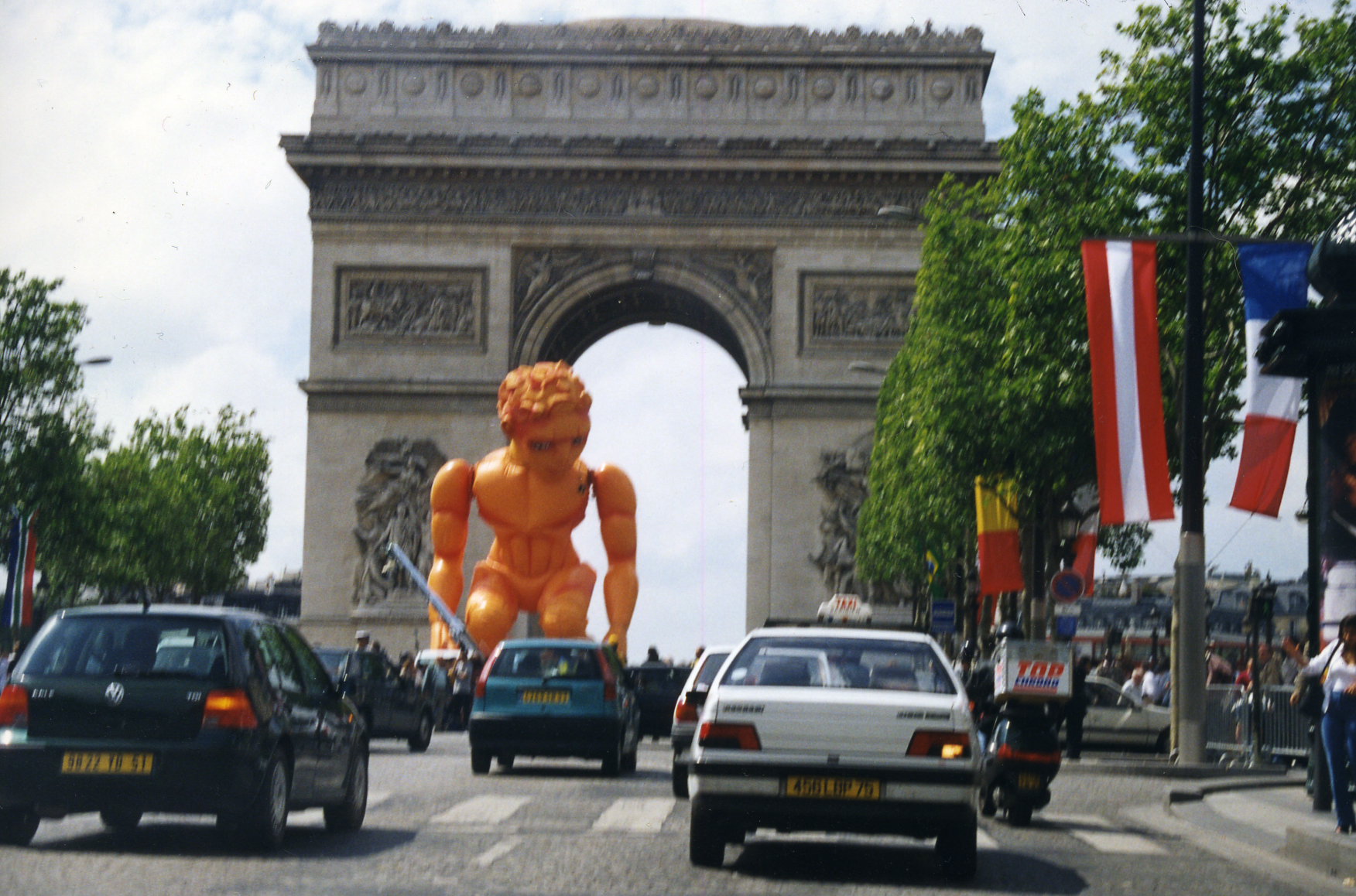
Opening parade of the 1998 World Cup in Paris.

The earliest recorded world championship in any sport was the jeu de paume tournament held in France in 1740, where Frenchman Clergé became the first world champion. Following the success of shooting at the 1896 Summer Olympics, Lyon hosted the inaugural Shooting World Championships in 1897, with the international federation established a decade later. The first recurring international tournament was the European gymnastics tournament, hosted by France in Bordeaux (1905), Paris (1913), and Lyon (1926). In 1930, Chamonix initiated the first Ice Hockey World Championship outside the Olympic framework, though it was relocated to Berlin and Vienna due to weather; Paris later hosted the event in 1951 and co-hosted it with Cologne, Germany, in 2017. The first Artistic Gymnastics World Championships took place in Paris in 1931 during the Colonial Exhibition, (Note: Latte 1948, p. 301) with subsequent events in France in 1978 and 1992. The World Figure Skating Championships were held in Paris in 1936 and returned to France five times through 2000. In 1937, Paris hosted the inaugural World Fencing Championships, with France hosting the event eight times, most recently in 2010. France hosted the FIFA World Cup in 1938 and again in 1998. After World War II (1939–1945), the number of world championships grew, with France hosting the Judo World Championships in 1979, 1982 (women's), 1997, and 2011; wrestling in 1987; athletics in 2003; and rugby union in 2007.

=== Grand Prix and major events ===
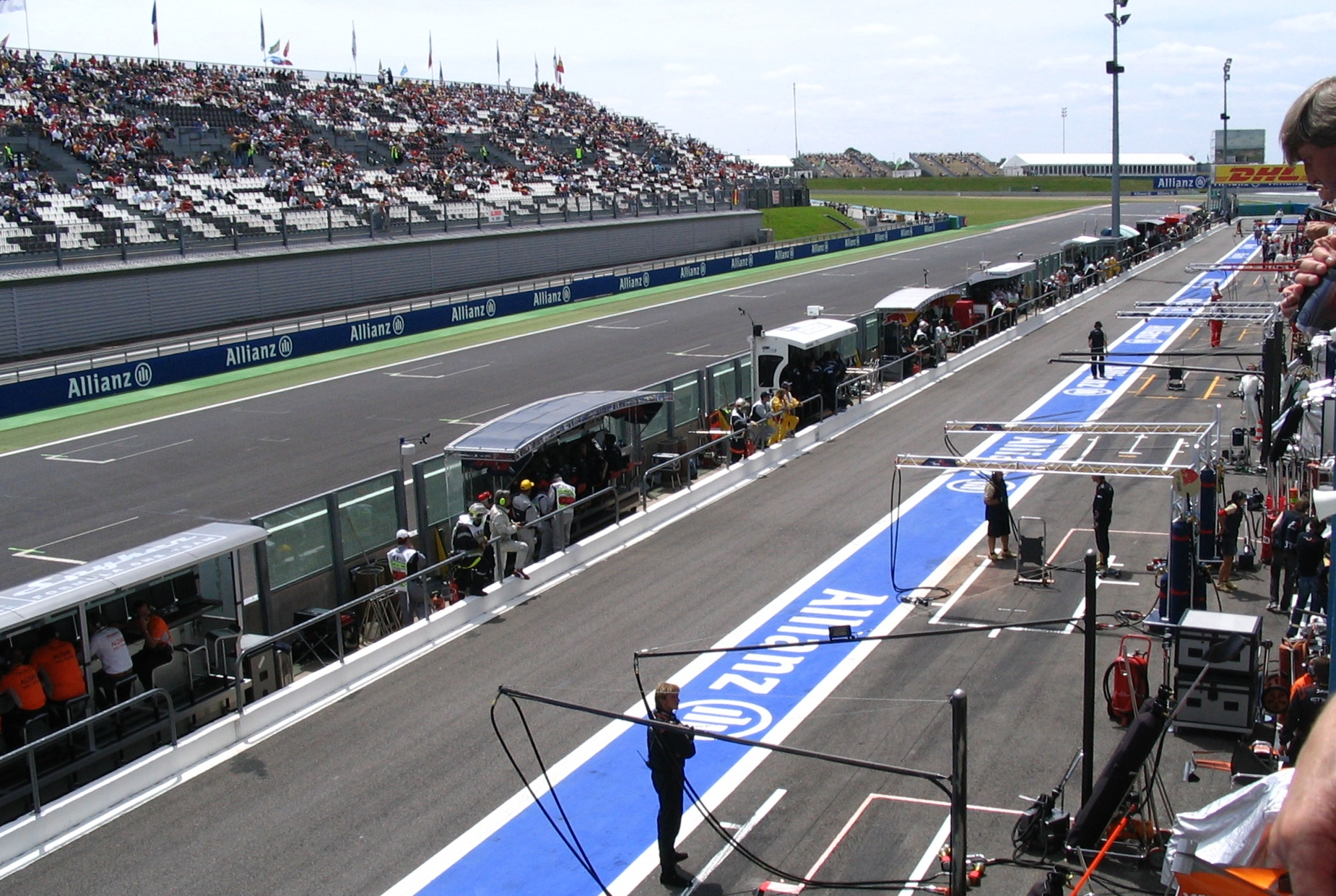
French Grand Prix at Magny-Cours.

The term "Grand Prix" originated in 1863 with the "Grand Prix de Paris" in horse racing and later expanded to other sports, including cycling, automobile racing with the "Grand Prix de Pau" in 1901, motorcycle racing, and tennis with Roland-Garros in 1925. Major bilateral international matches in team and individual sports, along with the finals of French national championships, are also significant. Notably, the French football cup final, presided over by the President of the Republic since 1927, (Note: Gaston Doumergue inaugurated this tradition on May 8, 1927.) and the French rugby union championship final, presided over annually by the Prime Minister, hold particular prominence.

=== Francophonie games ===
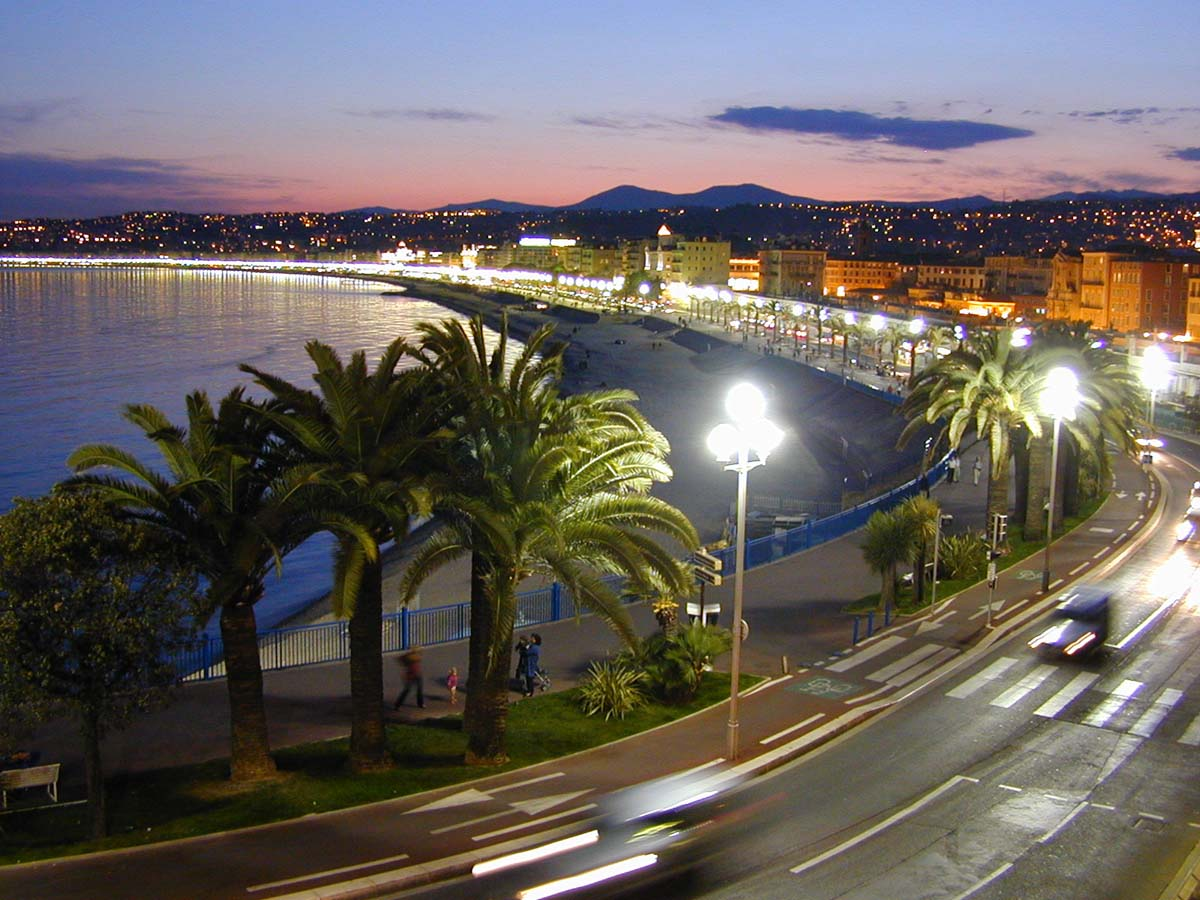
In 2013, Nice will host the Francophone Games.

French remains one of the few languages, alongside English, used in international sports terminology, particularly as the official language of the International Fencing Federation and the Olympic Games. Since the 2004 Athens Games, the Organisation internationale de la Francophonie ("OIF") has appointed a prominent figure as a senior observer to ensure compliance with this linguistic rule. Appointees designated by OIF Secretary-General Abdou Diouf have included Hervé Bourges, Lise Bissonnette, Jean-Pierre Raffarin, Pascal Couchepin, and Michaëlle Jean, former Governor General of Canada.

The Jeux de la Francophonie, organized by the International Committee of the Francophonie Games ("CIJF") under the Organisation internationale de la Francophonie ("OIF"), is a key platform through which France maintains prominence in global sports. Established in 1987 during the Francophone summit in Quebec, the games were managed by the Conference of Ministers of Youth and Sports of French-speaking countries ("CONFEJES") until 2004, when the CIJF became an OIF entity. France hosted the event in Nice in 2013.

== At the dawn of the 21st century ==
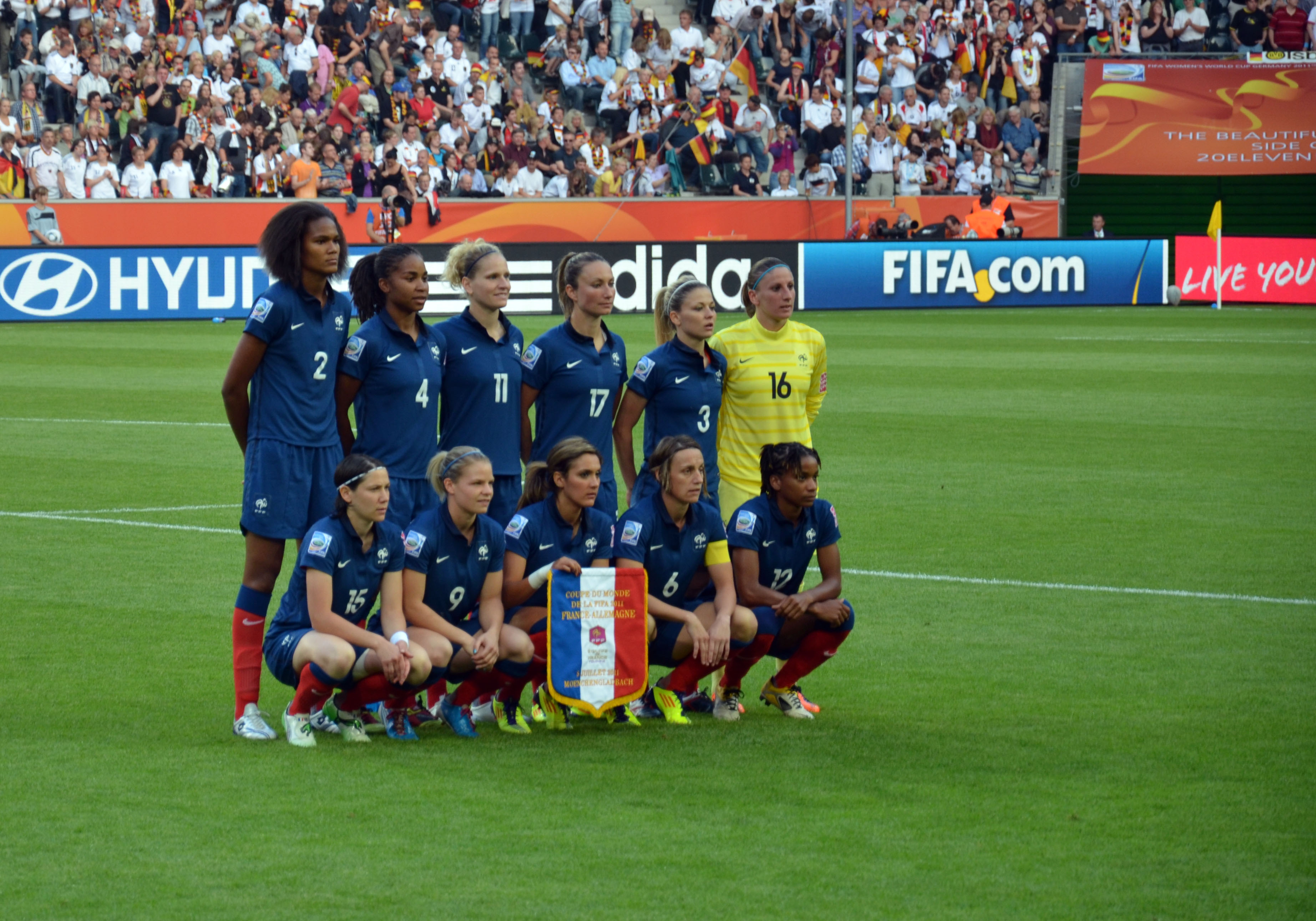
2011 French women's national soccer team.

Over the past century, modern sport in France has evolved from individual initiatives to a politically significant activity, transitioning from a national associative partner to a public service delegate of the State. The oversight of sports has shifted from retrospective control of public fund usage to proactive regulation, including mandatory statutory provisions. The degree of State intervention varies, primarily occurring when sports organizations fail to self-manage effectively. Ongoing territorial reforms, decentralizing fundingm and decision-making are expected to influence the current hierarchical structure. A conference in Lyon in November 2012, attended by over 500 local government representatives, highlighted uncertainties surrounding these changes.

The distinction between professional and amateur sport in France was a significant issue until the 1990s when the professionalization of the Olympic Games in 1992 and rugby union in 1995 resolved this long-standing debate. Professional status was extended to handball, basketball, and volleyball in the 1990s, though some sports, such as women's football, remain amateur, while women's basketball and volleyball have professionalized. In 1963, the National Sports Museum, directed by Jean Durry, opened in Paris as a symbolic tribute to French sport history and its notable athletes, blending art and sport. The museum closed in December 2012 and reopened in Nice on June 27, 2014.

== See also ==
- Sport in France

== Bibliography ==
=== Works used in the writing ===
- Arnaud, Pierre (2002). Le sport et les Français pendant l'occupation [Sport and the French during the occupation] (in French). Vol. 1. Paris: L'Harmattan. ISBN 2-7475-2077-3.
- Arvin-Bérod, Alain (2003). Et Didon créa la devise olympique [And Dido created the Olympic motto] (in French). Grenoble: Scriforius. ISBN 2-908854-16-3.
- Barrull, Raymond (1984). Les étapes de la gymnastique au sol et aux agrès en France et dans le monde [The stages of floor and apparatus gymnastics in France and around the world] (in French). Paris: French Gymnastics Federation. ISBN 978-2950060303.
- Comité des travaux historiques et scientifiques (1992). Jeux et sports dans l'histoire [Games and sports throughout history] (in French). Vol. 1: associations et politiques. Paris: CTHS.
- Escot, Richard; Rivière, Jacques (2010). Un siècle de rugby [A century of rugby] (in French) (13th ed.). Calmann-Lévy. ISBN 978-2-7021-4118-2.
- Hervet, Robert (1948). La FSF de 1898 à 1948 [The FSF from 1898 to 1948] (in French). OCLC 66302325.
- Latte, Jean (1948). La gymnastique [Gymnastics] (in French). Paris: Vigot.
- Lebecq, Pierre-Alban (2004). Sports, éducation physique et mouvements affinitaires au XXe siècle [Sports, physical education, and related movements in the 20th century] (in French). Paris: L'Harmattan. ISBN 2-7475-5974-2.
- Mehl, Jean-Michel (1990). Les jeux au royaume de France du XIIIe au XVIe siècle [Games in the Kingdom of France from the 13th to the 16th century] (in French). Paris: Fayard.
- Merkel, Michel (2012). -14-18, le sport sort des tranchées. Un héritage inattendu de la Grande Guerre [-14-18, sport emerges from the trenches. An unexpected legacy of the Great War] (in French). Toulouse: Le pas de l'oiseau. ISBN 978-2-917971-26-0.
- Mueller, Norbert (1998). Coubertin et l'Olympisme. Questions pour l'avenir [Coubertin and Olympism. Questions for the future] (in French). Walla Walla Press. ISBN 0958707952.
- Nadot, Sébastien (2012). Le spectacle des joutes: sport et courtoisie à la fin du Moyen âge [The spectacle of jousting: sport and courtesy in the late Middle Ages] (in French). Rennes: Presses universitaires de Rennes. ISBN 978-2-7535-2148-3.
- Piard, Claude (1974). Vers une nouvelle politique sportive [Towards a new sports policy] (in French). Paris: Amphora.
- Piard, Claude (2000). Où va la gym ?: l'éducation physique à l'heure des STAPS [Where is physical education headed? Physical education in the age of sports science] (in French). Paris: L’Harmattan. ISBN 2-7384-9242-8.
- Piard, Claude (2001). Éducation physique et sport: petit manuel d'histoire élémentaire [Physical education and sport: a brief history] (in French). Paris: L’Harmattan. ISBN 2-7475-1744-6.
- Terret, Thierry (1996). Histoire des sports [History of sports] (in French). Paris: L’Harmattan.
- Terret, Thierry (1998). L'institution et le nageur : histoire de la Fédération française de natation (1919-1939) [The institution and the swimmer: history of the French Swimming Federation (1919-1939)] (in French). Lyon: Presses Universitaires de Lyon. ISBN 2-7297-0601-1.
- Ulmann, Jacques (1977). De la gymnastique aux sports modernes: histoire des doctrines de l'éducation physique [From gymnastics to modern sports: history of physical education doctrines] (in French). Paris: Vrin. ISBN 978-2711607136.
- Zoro, Jean (2002). 150 ans d'EPS [150 years of physical education] (in French). Paris: AEEPS. ISBN 2-90-2568-13-4.

=== Further reading ===
- Arnaud, Pierre; Camy, Jean (1986). La naissance du mouvement sportif associatif en France [The birth of the sports association movement in France] (in French). Lyon: Presses universitaires de Lyon.
- Arvin-Bérod, Alain (1996). Les enfants d'Olympie (1796-1896) [The Children of Olympia (1796–1896)] (in French). Paris: CERF.
- Attali, Michaël (2010). Sports et Médias. Du XIXe siècle à nos jours [Sports and Media. From the 19th Century to the Present Day]. Musée National du Sport (in French). Biarritz, Paris: Atlantica. ISBN 978-2-7588-0160-3.
- Bui-Xuân, Gilles; Gleyse, Jacques (2002). L'émergence de l'éducation physique. Georges Demenij et Georges Hébert [The emergence of physical education. Georges Demenij and Georges Hébert] (in French). Paris: Hatier.
- Brossard, Philippe (1994). Pierre de Coubertin (in French). Vol. 21. Paris: Maître-Sport.
- Comité des travaux historiques et scientifiques (1992a). Jeux et sports dans l'histoire [Games and sports throughout history] (in French). Vol. 2: pratiques sportives. Paris: CTHS.
- Dumons, Bruno; Pollet, Gilles; Berjat, Muriel (1987). Naissance du sport moderne [The birth of modern sport] (in French). Lyon: La Manufacture.
- Fieschi, Jean-Toussaint (1983). Histoire du sport français de 1870 à nos jours [History of French sport from 1870 to the present day] (in French). Paris: PAC. ASIN B0000EA1G1.
- Freccero, Renata (2002). La Fabrica dei corpi [The Body Factory] (in Italian). Turin: Levrotto e Bella.
- Gleyse, Jacques (1995). Archéologie de l'Education Physique au XXe siècle en France [Archaeology of Physical Education in the 20th Century in France] (in French). Paris: PUF.
- Gleyse, Jacques (1997). L'Instrumentalisation du corps [The Instrumentalization of the Body] (in French). Paris: L'harmattan.
- Gleyse, Jacques (1999). L'Education Physique au XXe siècle en France. Approches historique et culturelle [Physical Education in the 20th Century in France. Historical and Cultural Approaches] (in French). Paris: Vigot.
- Gounot, André; Jallat, Denis; Caritey, Benoît (2007). Les politiques au stade. Étude comparée des manifestations sportives du XIXe au XXIe siècle [Politics in the stadium. A comparative study of sporting events from the 19th to the 21st century] (in French). Rennes: PUR.
- Hubscher, Ronald (1992). L'histoire en mouvements, le sport dans la société française (XIXe - XXe siècle) [History in motion: sport in French society (19th–20th centuries)] (in French). Paris: Armand Colin.
- Jusserand, Jean-Jules (1901). Les sports et jeux d'exercice dans l'ancienne France [Sports and exercise games in ancient France] (in French). Paris, Geneva: Champion- Slatkine.
- Kssis-Martov, Nicolas (2020). Terrains de jeux, terrains de luttes: Militant-e-s du sport [Playgrounds, battlefields: Sports activists] (in French). Ivry: Editions de l’Atelier. ISBN 978-2-7082-4625-6.
- Merdrignac, Bernard (2002). Le Sport au Moyen Âge [Sport in the Middle Ages] (in French). Rennes: Presses universitaires de Rennes.
- Mugnier, Raphaël (1992). Jeux et sports dans l'histoire : Les sports d'hiver à travers les Jeux olympiques de Chamonix Mont-Blanc en 1924 [Games and sports in history: Winter sports through the 1924 Olympic Games in Chamonix Mont-Blanc] (in French). Paris: CTHS. ISBN 2735502465.
