= French Gymnastics Championships =

French Gymnastics Championships (French: Les championnats de France Elite de gymnastique) are an annual gymnastics competition, organized by the French Gymnastics Federation. The men's and women's national championships in artistic gymnastics and the national championships in rhythmic gymnastics usually take place at the same time. The winners claim the title of "Champion of France".

== Winners ==
Year	Location	Date	Winners in the individual all-around			Detailed results
Year	Location	Date	MAG	WAG	RG	Detailed results
2003	Albertville	5 April	Benoît Caranobe	Marine Debauve	Aurélie Lacour	
2004	Le Mans	3–4 April	Benoît Caranobe	Coralie Chacon	Delphine Ledoux	
2005	Metz	2–3 April	Yann Cucherat	Marine Debauve	Delphine Ledoux	
2006	Nantes	1 April	Raphaël Wignanitz	Rose-Éliandre Bellemare	Delphine Ledoux	
2007	Toulouse	7–8 April	Dimitri Karbanenko	Katheleen Lindor	Delphine Ledoux	
2008	Toulon	14–15 June	Dimitri Karbanenko	Pauline Morel	Delphine Ledoux	
2009	Liévin	29–31 May	Benoît Caranobe	Marine Petit	Delphine Ledoux	
2010	Albertville	21–23 May	Hamilton Sabot	Marine Brevet	Delphine Ledoux	
2011	Toulouse	20–22 May	Cyril Tommasone	Marine Petit	Delphine Ledoux	
2012	Nantes	9–10 June	Pierre-Yves Bény	Anne Kuhm	Delphine Ledoux	link
2013	Mulhouse	23–24 March	Arnaud Willig	Valentine Sabatou	Kseniya Moustafaeva	link
2014	Agen	5–6 April	Kévin Antoniotti	Youna Dufournet	Kseniya Moustafaeva	
2015	Rouen	14–15 March	Axel Augis	Loan His	Kseniya Moustafaeva	
2016	Mulhouse	18–19 June	Julien Gobaux	Marine Boyer	Kseniya Moustafaeva	
2017	Les Ponts-de-Cé	27–28 May	Zachari Hrimèche	Mélanie de Jesus dos Santos	Kseniya Moustafaeva	
2018	Caen	19–20 May	Julien Gobaux	Mélanie de Jesus dos Santos	Kseniya Moustafaeva	
2019	Saint-Brieuc	8–9 June	Loris Frasca	Mélanie de Jesus dos Santos	Célia Joseph-Noël	
2021	Mouilleron-le-Captif	5–6 June	Julien Gobaux	Carolann Héduit	Maelle Millet	
2022	Elancourt	7–8 July	Paul Degouy	Carolann Héduit	Maelle Millet	
2023	Saint-Brieuc	16–18 June	Benjamin Osberger	Djenna Laroui	Maelle Millet	
2024	Lyon	7–9 June	Léo Saladino	Mélanie de Jesus dos Santos	Hélène Karbanov	
2025	Agen	18–20 April	Léo Saladino	Lorette Charpy		
2026	Mulhouse	5–7 June	Leeroy Traore-Malatre	Elena Colas		

== See also ==
- French Rhythmic Gymnastics Championships
