= France at the Olympics =

- IOC code: FRA
- NOC: French National Olympic and Sports Committee
- Website: www.franceolympique.com (in French)
- Medals Ranked 6th: Gold 293 Silver 329 Bronze 363 Total 985

Summer appearances
- 1896; 1900; ~~1904~~; 1908; 1912; 1920; 1924; 1928; 1932; 1936; 1948; 1952; 1956; 1960; 1964; 1968; 1972; 1976; 1980; 1984; 1988; 1992; 1996; 2000; 2004; 2008; 2012; 2016; 2020; 2024; 2028

Winter appearances
- 1924; 1928; 1932; 1936; 1948; 1952; 1956; 1960; 1964; 1968; 1972; 1976; 1980; 1984; 1988; 1992; 1994; 1998; 2002; 2006; 2010; 2014; 2018; 2022; 2026

Other related appearances
- 1906 Intercalated Games

The modern Olympic Games were founded by French historian Pierre de Coubertin. France has competed in every edition (both Summer and Winter), with the possible exception of the 1904 Games (as sources disagree about whether athlete Albert Corey competed for the United States or France).

Through the Paris 2024 Games, French athletes had won 815 medals at the Summer Olympic Games in a wide variety of sports, achieving particular success in fencing, cycling and judo. France has won an additional 138 medals at the Winter Olympic Games, notably in alpine skiing and biathlon.

Several French athletes have left a significant mark on Olympic history. Biathlete Martin Fourcade holds the national record for Olympic titles with six gold medals, followed by judoka Teddy Riner and fellow biathlete Quentin Fillon Maillet, each with five gold medals. The record for the most total Olympic medals by a French athlete is held by Fillon Maillet, who won nine medals overall between 2022 and 2026. Fillon Maillet is followed by fencers Philippe Cattiau and Roger Ducret, each with eight medals earned during the 1920s and 1930s. Fourcade and Riner follow closely with seven medals each, and are trailed by fellow fencing legends Lucien Gaudin, Christian d'Oriola, and Philippe Riboud, who each amassed six medals over their Olympic careers.

== Hosted Games ==
French host cities of the Olympic Games

In June 1894, during the first Olympic Congress in Paris, on the initiative of Pierre de Coubertin, it was decided to resume the Olympic Games and to found the IOC. In 1900, Paris hosted the second modern Summer Olympic Games, which took place as part of the World Exhibition. The Olympics were held there in Paris a second time in 1924 and a third time in 2024. This makes Paris, together with London, the current record city host, to which Los Angeles will also be added with its third hosting of the Summer Olympics in 2028. In total, France has hosted the Olympic games on six occasions and is scheduled to host a seventh with the 2030 Winter Olympics in the French Alps.

Games	Host city	Dates	Nations	Participants	Events
1900 Summer Olympics	Paris	14 May – 28 October	24	997	95
1924 Winter Olympics	Chamonix	25 January – 4 February	16	258	16
1924 Summer Olympics	Paris	5 – 27 July	44	3,089	126
1968 Winter Olympics	Grenoble	6 – 18 February	37	1,158	35
1992 Winter Olympics	Albertville	8 – 23 February	64	1,801	57
2024 Summer Olympics	Paris	26 July – 11 August	206	10,714	329
2030 Winter Olympics	French Alps	1 – 17 February	TBC	TBC	TBC

== Medal tables ==
=== Medals by Summer Games ===
Host country

Games	Athletes	Gold	Silver	Bronze	Total	Rank
(Kingdom of Greece) 1896 Athens	13	5	4	2	11	4
(French Third Republic) 1900 Paris	491	31	41	40	112	1
(United States) 1904 St. Louis	did not participate					
(United Kingdom) 1908 London	363	5	5	9	19	4
(Sweden) 1912 Stockholm	119	7	4	3	14	5
(Belgium) 1920 Antwerp	304	9	19	13	41	8
(French Third Republic) 1924 Paris	401	13	15	10	38	3
(Netherlands) 1928 Amsterdam	255	6	10	5	21	7
(United States) 1932 Los Angeles	103	10	5	4	19	3
(Nazi Germany) 1936 Berlin	201	7	6	6	19	5
(United Kingdom) 1948 London	316	10	6	13	29	3
(Finland) 1952 Helsinki	245	6	6	6	18	7
(Australia) 1956 Melbourne	137	4	4	6	14	11
(Italy) 1960 Rome	238	0	2	3	5	25
(Japan) 1964 Tokyo	138	1	8	6	15	21
1968 Mexico City	200	7	3	5	15	6
(West Germany) 1972 Munich	227	2	4	7	13	17
(Canada) 1976 Montreal	206	2	3	4	9	15
(Soviet Union) 1980 Moscow	121	6	5	3	14	8
(United States) 1984 Los Angeles	238	5	7	16	28	12
(South Korea) 1988 Seoul	266	6	4	6	16	9
(Spain) 1992 Barcelona	350	8	5	16	29	9
(United States) 1996 Atlanta	299	15	7	15	37	5
(Australia) 2000 Sydney	336	13	14	11	38	6
(Greece) 2004 Athens	308	11	9	13	33	7
(China) 2008 Beijing	323	7	16	20	43	10
(United Kingdom) 2012 London	330	11	11	13	35	7
(Brazil) 2016 Rio de Janeiro	401	10	18	14	42	7
(Japan) 2020 Tokyo	385	10	12	11	33	8
(France) 2024 Paris	573	16	26	22	64	5
(United States) 2028 Los Angeles	future event					
(Australia) 2032 Brisbane	future event					
Total (29/30)	7,887	243	279	302	824	5

Notes

- ^{ART} Art competitions (1912–1948) are not included in the medal table above, as they were non-sports events formerly part of the Olympic Games. (Note: In 1952, art competition medals, as well as the gold medal awards for feats in alpinism and aeronautics, were removed from the official national medal counts. Only since 2021 have they been officially listed again by the IOC in the medal tables and respective National Olympic Committee (NOC) profiles on its website.) France won a total of 13 art competition medals (4 gold, 4 silver, and 5 bronze), across the 1912, 1920, 1924, 1928, 1932, and 1948 Summer Olympics.
- ^{NAT} Athletes at the early Olympic Games (1896–1904) are attributed by the International Olympic Committee (IOC) according to the national affiliation of their club or team, rather than their nationality. (Note: In 2024, the IOC reinstated its original and current attribution policy for athletes at the early Olympic Games (1896–1904). From 2021 to 2024, the IOC briefly attributed medals in individual events according to the athlete's nationality, even when the athlete represented a foreign club or team. Since 2024, participation and medals have instead been attributed according to the national affiliation of the club or team represented by the athlete.)
  - 1900 Olympic Games:
    Luxembourgish Michel Théato (LUX) (athletics; one gold), British Lloyd Hildebrand (GBR) (cycling; one silver), and American Abbie Pratt (USA) (golf; one bronze) represented French clubs, and their results were attributed to France.
  - 1904 Olympic Games:
    Conversely, Frenchman Albert Corey competed at the 1904 Summer Olympics for an American club, winning the silver medal in marathon. As a representative of an American club, his participation and medals were attributed to the United States.
- ^{MIX} At the 1900 Summer Olympics seven team event medals (3 gold, 2 silver, and 2 bronze) won by French clubs competing as mixed teams—composed primarily of French athletes alongside a few non-French participants—were attributed to France: one gold in rugby, two golds in sailing, one silver each in cricket and tug of war, and one bronze each in polo, and water polo.

=== Medals by Winter Games ===
Host country

Games	Athletes	Gold	Silver	Bronze	Total	Rank
(France) 1924 Chamonix	43	0	0	3	3	9
(Switzerland) 1928 St. Moritz	38	1	0	0	1	5
(United States) 1932 Lake Placid	8	1	0	0	1	7
(Nazi Germany) 1936 Garmisch-Partenkirchen	28	0	0	1	1	10
(Switzerland) 1948 St. Moritz	36	2	1	2	5	5
(Norway) 1952 Oslo	26	0	0	1	1	12
(Italy) 1956 Cortina d'Ampezzo	32	0	0	0	0	–
(United States) 1960 Squaw Valley	26	1	0	2	3	10
(Austria) 1964 Innsbruck	24	3	4	0	7	5
(France) 1968 Grenoble	75	4	3	2	9	3
(Japan) 1972 Sapporo	40	0	1	2	3	16
(Austria) 1976 Innsbruck	35	0	0	1	1	16
(United States) 1980 Lake Placid	22	0	0	1	1	16
(Socialist Federal Republic of Yugoslavia) 1984 Sarajevo	32	0	1	2	3	13
(Canada) 1988 Calgary	68	1	0	1	2	11
(France) 1992 Albertville	109	3	5	1	9	7
(Norway) 1994 Lillehammer	98	0	1	4	5	17
(Japan) 1998 Nagano	106	2	1	5	8	13
(United States) 2002 Salt Lake City	114	4	5	2	11	6
(Italy) 2006 Turin	82	3	2	4	9	10
(Canada) 2010 Vancouver	108	3	2	6	11	11
(Russia) 2014 Sochi	116	4	4	7	15	10
(South Korea) 2018 Pyeongchang	106	5	4	6	15	9
(China) 2022 Beijing	86	5	7	2	14	10
(Italy) 2026 Milano Cortina	160	8	9	6	23	6
(France) 2030 French Alps	future event					
(United States) 2034 Utah	future event					
Total (25/25)	1,618	50	50	61	161	11

Number of medals won by France at the Olympic summer games from 1896 to 2012.

Number of medals won by France at the Olympic winter games from 1924 to 2014.

=== Medals by summer sport ===
Leading in that sport

Sport	Gold	Silver	Bronze	Total
Fencing	45	47	38	130
Cycling	44	29	29	102
Judo	18	15	34	67
Sailing	17	15	21	53
Equestrian	15	16	14	45
Athletics	14	28	30	72
Swimming	12	17	21	50
Shooting	9	13	9	31
Canoeing	9	11	19	39
Weightlifting	9	3	3	15
Rowing	8	15	13	36
Archery	7	12	8	27
Boxing	6	11	11	28
Tennis	5	6	8	19
Wrestling	4	4	10	18
Handball	4	3	1	8
Gymnastics	3	10	9	22
Croquet	3	2	2	7
Rugby	2	3	0	5
Volleyball	2	0	0	2
Taekwondo	1	3	6	10
Football	1	2	0	3
Water polo	1	0	3	4
Triathlon	1	0	2	3
Surfing	1	0	1	2
Karate	1	0	0	1
Water motorsports	1	0	0	1
Basketball	0	6	1	7
Modern pentathlon	0	2	2	4
Table tennis	0	1	3	4
3x3 basketball	0	1	0	1
Breaking	0	1	0	1
Cricket	0	1	0	1
Diving	0	1	0	1
Tug of war	0	1	0	1
Artistic swimming	0	0	1	1
Golf	0	0	1	1
Marathon swimming	0	0	1	1
Polo	0	0	1	1
Totals (39 entries)	243	279	302	824

=== Medals by winter sport ===
Sport	Gold	Silver	Bronze	Total
Biathlon	19	12	14	45
Alpine skiing	16	18	18	52
Figure skating	5	3	7	15
Snowboarding	4	5	5	14
Freestyle skiing	3	6	7	16
Nordic combined	2	1	1	4
Ski mountaineering	1	1	1	3
Cross-country skiing	0	4	4	8
Bobsleigh	0	0	1	1
Curling	0	0	1	1
Military patrol	0	0	1	1
Ski jumping	0	0	1	1
Totals (12 entries)	50	50	61	161

*Military patrol is considered to be the precursor to biathlon, however the official website of the Olympic Movement designates military patrol as a separate discipline. The Official Report of the 1924 Games regards it as an event within the sport of skiing.

Best results in non-medaling sports:

Summer
Sport	Rank	Athlete	Event & Year
Badminton	5th	Hongyan Pi	Women's singles in 2008
Beach volleyball	9th	Anabelle Prawerman & Cécile Rigaux	Women's tournament in 2000
Field hockey	4th	France men's team	Men's tournament in 1920
Field hockey	4th	France men's team	Men's tournament in 1932
Rhythmic gymnastics	6th	Aïnhoa Dot-Espinosa; Manelle Inaho; Célia Joseph-Noël; Justine Lavit; Lozéa Vilarino	Women's group in 2024
Trampoline gymnastics	4th	David Martin	Men's individual in 2000
Skateboarding	4th	Vincent Milou	Men's street in 2020
Sport climbing	5th	Mickaël Mawem	Men's combined in 2020
Winter
Sport	Rank	Athlete	Event & Year
Ice hockey	5th	France men's team	Men's tournament in 1924
Ice hockey	5th	France men's team	Men's tournament in 1928
Luge	11th	Georges Tresallet & Ion Pervilhac	Men's doubles in 1968
Short track speed skating	5th	Marc Bella; Arnaud Drouet; Rémi Ingres; Claude Nicouleau	Men's 5000 metre relay in 1992
Short track speed skating	5th	Bruno Loscos	Men's 1500 metres in 2002
Short track speed skating	5th	Stéphanie Bouvier; Min Kyung Choi; Myrtille Gollin; Céline Lecompére	Women's 3000 metre relay in 2006
Short track speed skating	5th	Jean Charles Mattei; Benjamin Macé; Thibaut Fauconnet; Maxime Chataignier; Jeremy Masson	Men's 5000 metre relay in 2010
Skeleton	14th	Philippe Cavoret	Men's individual in 2006
Speed skating	4th	Hans van Helden	Men's 1500 metres in 1984
Speed skating	4th	Alexis Contin	Men's 10000 metres in 2010
Speed skating	4th	Timothy Loubineaud	Men's 10,000 metres in 2026

== Summary by summer sport ==
=== Aquatics ===
==== Artistic Swimming ====
France's only artistic swimming medal came in the Women's duet at the 2000 Summer Olympics.

Games	Swimmers	Events	Gold	Silver	Bronze	Total
2000 Sydney	9	2/2	0	0	1	1
Total			0	0	1	1

==== Diving ====
France's only diving medal came in the women's three-metre springboard in 1952.

Games	Divers	Events	Gold	Silver	Bronze	Total
1952 Helsinki	4	4/4	0	1	0	1
Total			0	1	0	1

==== Swimming ====
France first competed in swimming at the Paris 1900 Games, with 47 swimmers, taking five medals, including one Gold.

Games	Swimmers	Events	Gold	Silver	Bronze	Total
1900	47	7/7	1	2	2	5
1932	5	5/11	0	1	0	1
1948	17	11/11	0	0	2	2
1952	16	11/11	1	1	1	3
1964	16	8/18	0	1	0	1
1968	16	?/29	0	0	1	1
1984	16	15/29	0	1	1	2
1988	25	29/31	0	0	2	2
1992	25	25/31	0	0	3	3
2000	19	22/32	0	1	0	1
2004	21	23/32	1	2	3	6
2008	35	27/34	1	2	3	6
2012	31	24/34	4	2	1	7
2016	30	24/34	0	2	1	3
2020	28	28/37	0	1	0	1
2024	33	30/37	4	1	2	7
Total			12	17	22	51

==== Water Polo ====
France was a winner of 1924 tournament, and have twice more finished third.

Games	Water polo players	Events	Gold	Silver	Bronze	Total
1900 Paris	11	1/1	0	0	2	2
1924 Paris	11	1/1	1	0	0	1
1928 Amsterdam	9	1/1	0	0	1	1
Total			1	0	3	4

=== Archery ===
France competed in archery in its first Olympic appearance in Paris 1900. The French team there took 13 of the 20 medals, including gold in 4 of the 7 events.

Games	Archers	Events	Gold	Silver	Bronze	Total	Rank
1900	129	7	4	5	4	13	1
1904	Did not compete						
1908	15	3	1	1	1	3	2
1912	No competition						
1920	8	10	1	4	1	6	2
1924-1968	Did not compete						
1972	5	2	0	0	0	0	-
1976	2	2	0	0	0	0	-
1980	Did not compete						
1984	2	2	0	0	0	0	-
1988	6	4	0	0	0	0	-
1992	6	4	1	0	0	1	2
1996	4	4	0	0	0	0	-
2000	5	4	0	0	0	0	-
2004	6	4	0	0	0	0	-
2008	5	4	0	0	1	1	5
2012	4	4	0	0	0	0	-
2016	3	4	0	1	0	1	3
2020	4	5	0	0	0	0	-
2024	6	5	0	1	1	2	2
Total			7	12	8	27	4

=== Athletics ===
France first competed in athletics at the inaugural 1896 Games, winning a silver and a bronze. The nation's first gold medal in the sport is a disputed one; Michel Théato was Luxembourgish but living in Paris; his win in the 1900 marathon is credited to France by the International Olympic Committee, which rejected a petition by Luxembourg to change the Olympic record of Théato's nationality.

Games	Athletes	Events	Gold	Silver	Bronze	Total	Rank
1896	5	9/12	0	1	1	2	
1900	23	18/23	1	4	2	7	
1976		37	1	0	0	1	11
1980	25	28	0	0	1	1	16
1984	21	41	1	1	2	4	9
1988	55	42	0	0	1	1	18
1992	57	43	1	0	0	1	13
1996	49	44	3	0	1	4	4
2000	53	46	0	0	0	0	-
2004	61	46	0	0	2	2	33
2008	52	57	0	1	2	3	27
2012	52	47	1	1	1	3	12
2016	54	47	0	3	3	6	21
2020	61	48	0	1	0	1	31
2024	90	48	0	1	0	1	31
Total			14	27	29	70	16

=== Basque pelota ===
In the only appearance of basque pelota as a medal sport at the Olympics in 1900, the French team (one of only two teams to enter) withdrew shortly before the competition started, and the match was not played. The Spanish pair is credited with the gold medal.

Games	Players	Events	Gold	Silver	Bronze	Total
1900 Paris	2	1/1	0	0	0	0
Total			0	0	0	0

=== Cricket ===
France is one of two nations to have competed in the only Olympic cricket competition, in 1900. The French team lost to a British team, taking second place.

Games	Players	Events	Gold	Silver	Bronze	Total
1900 Paris	12	1/1	0	1	0	1
Total			0	1	0	1

=== Croquet ===
France was the only nation to compete in the only Olympic croquet competitions, in 1900.

Games	Players	Events	Gold	Silver	Bronze	Total
1900 Paris	10	3/3	3	2	2	7
Total			3	2	2	7

=== Cycling ===
France first competed in cycling in 1896, winning four of the six cycling events—all of the events which France contested. France has won more gold medals (41) and total medals (91) in the sport than any other nation.

Games	Cyclists	Events	Gold	Silver	Bronze	Total	Rank
1896 Athens	2	4/6	4	1	1	6	
2004	22	18	1	1	1	3	6
2008	28	18	2	3	1	6	2
2012	23	18	1	3	0	4	3
2016	21	18	0	0	1	1	18
2020	30	22	0	0	2	2	21
2024	31	22	3	3	3	9	1
Total			41	27	23	91	

=== Equestrian ===
France has won the third-most gold medals and fourth-most total medals in equestrian sports. The nation hosted the first equestrian events in Paris 1900, winning gold medals in two of the five events.

Games	Riders	Events	Gold	Silver	Bronze	Total	Rank
1900	39	5	2	2	4	8	2
1912	4	5	1	1	1	3	2
1920	12	7	0	2	0	2	4
1924	12	5	0	0	1	1	6
1928	9	6	0	2	0	2	5
1932	3	5	2	1	0	3	1
1936	9	6	0	1	0	1	2
1948		6	2	1	1	4	1
1952		6	1	1	1	3	2
1956		6	0	0	0	0	-
1960	7	5	0	0	1	1	7
1964		6	1	1	0	2	3
1968		6	1	1	0	2	4
1972		6	0	0	0	0	-
1976		6	1	0	0	1	4
1980	Did not compete						
1984	11	6	0	0	0	0	-
1988	12	6	1	1	1	3	2
1992	12	6	0	0	1	1	7
1996		6	0	0	1	1	7
2000	10	6	0	0	0	0	-
2004	9	6	1	0	0	1	4
2008	7	6	0	0	0	0	-
2012	10	6	0	0	0	0	-
2016	12	6	2	1	0	3	2
2020	9	6	0	0	1	1	6
2024	9	6	0	1	1	2	3
Total			15	16	14	45	3

=== Fencing ===
France has won the second-most gold medals and second-most total medals in fencing, in each case behind Italy.

Year	Fencers	Events	Gold	Silver	Bronze	Total	Rank
1896	4	3	1	2	0	3	2
1900	211	7	5	5	5	15	1
1904	Did not compete						
1908	22	7	2	1	1	4	1
1912	Did not compete						
1920	18	7	1	4	3	8	2
1924	24	7	3	3	0	6	1
1928	20	7	2	3	0	5	1
1932	11	7	2	1	0	3	2
1936	19	7	0	2	1	3	3
1948	21	7	3	1	0	4	1
1952	21	7	2	0	1	3	3
1956	18	7	1	1	2	4	3
1960	21	8	0	0	0	0	-
1964	20	8	0	2	3	5	4
1968	20	8	1	0	1	2	4
1972	19	8	0	1	2	3	5
1976	18	8	0	1	2	3	6
1980	16	8	4	1	1	6	1
1984	20	8	2	2	3	7	3
1988	19	8	2	1	0	3	2
1992	20	8	2	0	3	5	3
1996	15	10	2	2	3	7	3
2000	16	10	1	4	1	6	3
2004	19	10	3	1	2	6	2
2008	17	10	2	2	0	4	1
2012	11	10	0	0	0	0	–
2016	15	10	1	1	1	3	4
2020	18	12	2	2	1	5	2
2024	18	12	1	4	2	7	5
Total			45	47	38	130	2

=== Football ===
France competed in the first men's Olympic football "tournament", winning one match and losing another to earn a second place finish currently recognized as a silver medal performance. The nation was a frequent competitor from then through 1996, peaking with a gold medal win in 1984. France did not qualify for the men's tournament from 2000 to 2016, but has qualified for the 2020 Games.

France did not qualify for the first four women's tournaments from 1996 to 2008. The French women debuted in 2012, placing 4th, and followed that with a 5th-place finish in 2016.

Games	Players	Events	Gold	Silver	Bronze	Total
1900 Paris	13	1/1	0	1	0	1
1984 Los Angeles	17	1/1	1	0	0	1
2024 Paris	18	2/2	0	1	0	1
Total			1	2	0	3

=== Golf ===
France competed in the first Olympic golf tournaments in 1900, which the nation hosted. The French golfers' best results that year were 4th place for the women and 10th place for the men. France did not compete in the 1904 golf tournaments. When the sport returned to the Olympics in 2016, France had two men and two women compete; the best result was Grégory Bourdy's 21st-place finish.

Games	Fencers	Events	Gold	Silver	Bronze	Total
1900 Paris	7	2/2	0	0	0	0
2016 Rio de Janeiro	4	2/2	0	0	0	0
Total			0	0	0	0

=== Gymnastics ===
France had one gymnast participate in one event in the inaugural 1896 Games. The nation's first medals in the sport came when Paris hosted the Games in 1900; the only event on the schedule was the men's individual all-around, in which France swept the top 18 places (having 108 of the 135 competing gymnasts).

Games	Gymnasts	Events	Gold	Silver	Bronze	Total
1896 Athens	1	1/8	0	0	0	0
1900 Paris	108	1/1	1	1	1	3
Total			3	10	9	22

=== Polo ===
France competed at two of the five editions of Olympic polo tournaments, both occasions when Paris hosted the Games in 1900 and 1924. The nation is formally credited with no medals, though French players competed on a mixed team in 1900 (along with a British player) that took bronze. France had a fully-French team as well in 1900, which took fifth place. Both the all-French and the mixed team went 0–1 (losing to the same team), with the mixed team placed higher due to a bye. The French team in 1924 went 0–4 in the round-robin tournament. Thus, the overall Olympic record of teams with French polo players is 0–6.

Games	Players	Events	Gold	Silver	Bronze	Total
1900 Paris	7	1/1	0	0	0	0
1924 Paris	5	1/1	0	0	0	0
Total			0	0	0	0

=== Rowing ===
France hosted the inaugural Olympic rowing contests in Paris 1900. France won 2 of the 5 gold medals, and a French boy served as cox in the final for the otherwise Dutch team that won the coxed pair.

Games	No. Sailors	Events	Gold	Silver	Bronze	Total	Ranking
1896 Athens	Event wasn't held						
1900 Paris	59	(21)/5	2	3	1	6	1
1904 St Louis	0	0/5	0	0	0	0	
1908 London	0	0/5	0	0	0	0	
1912 Stockholm	19	(3)/4	0	0	0	0	
1916	Games Cancelled						
1920 Antwerp	14	3/5	0	1	1	2	5
1924 Paris	26	7/7	0	3	0	3	5
1928 Amsterdam	26	7/7	0	1	0	1	8
1932 Los Angeles	5	2/7	0	0	1	1	9=
1936 Berlin	20	5/7	0	0	2	2	8
1940	Games Cancelled						
1944	Games Cancelled						
1948 London	22	6/7	0	0	0	0	
1952 Helsinki	17	6/7	1	1	0	2	3
1956 Melbourne	14	2/7	0	0	1	1	8=
1960 Rome	16	3/7	0	1	0	1	6=
1964 Tokyo	23	5/7	0	1	0	1	7=
1968 Mexico City	16	5/7	0	0	0	0	
1972 Munich	18	4/7	0	0	0	0	
1976 Montreal	14	5/14	0	0	0	0	
1980	16	6/14	0	0	0	0	
1984 Los Angeles	23	6/14	1	0	0	1	
1988	12	5/14	0	0	0	0	
1992 Barcelona	25	8/14	0	0	0	0	
1996 Atlanta	21	8/14	0	1	3	4	12
2000 Sydney	19	8/14	2	0	1	3	4
2004 Athens	21	6/14	1	1	0	2	5=
2008 Beijing	21	8/14	0	0	2	2	
2012 London	14	5/14	0	1	0	1	11=
2016 Rio	18	7/14	1	0	1	2	8
2020 Tokyo	12	5/14	1	1	0	2	5
2024 Paris	4	2/14	0	0	0	0	
Total	515	264	9	15	13	37	12

=== Rugby ===
France hosted the inaugural Olympic rugby union contest in 1900, winning the gold medal over Germany and Great Britain. France did not play in 1908, but returned in 1920 (losing the single match to the United States) and 1924 (beating Romania but losing again to the United States).

With the return of rugby, in the form of rugby sevens, in 2016, France competed again. France had both men's and women's teams in 2016; both advanced out of pool play to the quarterfinals but were defeated there.

Games	Players	Events	Gold	Silver	Bronze	Total
1900 Paris	17	1/1	1	0	0	1
1920 Antwerp	15	1/1	0	1	0	1
1924 Paris	30	1/1	0	1	0	1
2016 Rio de Janeiro	25	2/2	0	0	0	0
Total			1	2	0	3

=== Sailing ===
France hosted the first Olympic sailing competitions in 1900, earning 24 total medals in the 13 events, including 5 golds.

Games	No. Sailors	Events	Gold	Silver	Bronze	Total	Ranking
1900	451	130/13	5	9	10	24	1
1908	3	1/4	0	0	1	1	4
1912	3	1/4	1	0	0	1	3
1920	3	1/14	0	1	0	1	6
1924	9	3/3	0	0	1	1	5
1928	13	3/3	1	0	0	1	3
1932	3	2/4	1	0	0	1	3
1936	14	4/4	0	0	0	0	
1948	17	5/5	0	0	0	0	
1952	9	4/5	0	0	0	0	
1956	8	4/5	0	0	0	0	
1960	11	5/5	0	0	0	0	
1964	3	2/5	0	0	0	0	
1968	9	4/5	0	0	0	0	
1972	11	5/6	1	1	0	2	2
1976	10	5/6	0	0	0	0	
1980	0	0/6	0	0	0	0	
1984	11	6/7	0	0	1	1	8
1988	13	7/8	2	0	0	2	1
1992	17	10/10	2	0	0	2	2
1996	13	8/10	0	0	0	0	
2000	12	7/11	0	0	0	0	
2004	18	11/11	1	0	1	2	7
2008	18	11/11	0	1	2	3	9
2012	16	10/10	0	0	1	1	12
2016	15	10/10	1	0	2	3	6
2020	14	9/10	0	2	1	3	8
2024	14	10/10	0	1	1	2	8=
Total	738	278 / 205	15	15	21	51	4

=== Shooting ===
France competed in shooting at the inaugural 1896 Games, with one shooter in one event, winning no medals. The nation's first medals came when France hosted the Games in 1900, with 3 golds and 10 total medals that year.

Games	Shooters	Events	Gold	Silver	Bronze	Total
1896 Athens	1	1/5	0	0	0	0
1900 Paris	37	9/9	3	4	3	10
Total			9	14	10	33

=== Tennis ===
France first competed in tennis at the inaugural 1896 Games, with one player competing in men's singles and losing in the first round.

Games	Athletes	Events	Gold	Silver	Bronze	Total
1896 Athens	1	1/2	0	0	0	0
1900 Paris	14	4/4	0	1	1	2
Total			5	6	8	19

== See also ==
- List of flag bearers for France at the Olympics
- Category:Olympic competitors for France
- France at the Paralympics
- List of Olympic female gymnasts for France
