= Maëlys Laporte =

French rhythmic gymnast

- Born: 31 December 2006 (age 19) Le Chesnay

Gymnastics career
- Discipline: Rhythmic gymnastics
- Country represented: France (2021-)
- Club: GR Elancourt Maurepas
- Head coach: Anna Baranova
- Assistant coach: Sara Bayón
- Choreographer: Gregory Milan
Medal record
Rhythmic Gymnastics
Representing France
Event	1st	2nd	3rd
FIG World Cup	0	0	1
Total	0	0	1
European Championships
Silver medal – second place	2025 Tallinn	5 Ribbons

Maëlys Laporte (born 31 December 2006) is a French rhythmic gymnast. She represents France as a member of the senior group.

== Biography ==
Laporte took up the sport at age 4. In December 2020 she was invited to a training stage to spot gymnasts for the future home Olympics. The following year she joined the French national team.

In 2022 she was selected for the Gymnasiada along Ainhoa Dot-Espinosa, Eleonore Caburet, Justine Lavit, and Emma Brochard. The group decided to withdraw for medical reasons, they were nevertheless awarded the bronze medal since the competition only included 3 groups.

On 28 April 2023 she took part in a demonstration in Miramas. In May it was revealed she was named as one of the group reserves for the European Championships in Baku. In August she was present in another demonstration in Thiais. In July she was again seleceted as a reserve for the World Championships in Valencia.

The following year she took part in the Thiais Grand Prix. In April she participated in an event in Paris to celebrate the to celebrate the hundred days remaining until the Olympic Games. The she was listed as a reserve for the European Championships in Budapest.

In 2025, with the retirement of some of the members of the previous group, she became a starter making her debut at the Grand Prix in Thiais. There she won silver in the All-Around and bronze with 5 ribbons. In April the group competed in the World Cup in Sofia, being 8th overall, 10th with 5 ribbons and 8th with 3 balls & 2 hoops. Weeks later they were in Tashkent, taking 6th place in the All-Around, 6th place with 5 ribbons and 4th place in the mixed final. In May they participated in the stage in Portimão, finishing 5th with 5 ribbons, 6th with 3 balls & 2 hoops and winning bronze in the All-Around. She was then selected for the European Championships in Tallinn, where the group was 9th overall and won silver in the 5 ribbons final.
