= Eleonore Caburet =

French rhythmic gymnast (born 2004)

- Born: 2 February 2004 (age 22) Rennes, France

Gymnastics career
- Discipline: Rhythmic gymnastics
- Country represented: France (2019-)
- Club: ASPTT Nice GR
- Head coach: Anna Baranova
- Assistant coach: Sara Bayón
- Former coaches: Alexia Laffage, Thierry Tochon, Irina Slitenko, Ludmila Pyankova
- Choreographer: Gregory Milan
Medal record
Rhythmic gymnastics
Representing France
Event	1st	2nd	3rd
FIG World Cup	1	2	5
Total	1	2	5

Eleonore Caburet (born 2 February 2004) is a French rhythmic gymnast, member of the French national group.

== Personal life ==
Caburet took up rhythmic gymnastics at age six, she was initially interested in dance as her mother worked as a dance teacher, as she was getting bored of it her sister showed her a video of a Russian gymnast and she fell in love with the sport. Her ambition is to be part of the French group that will compete at the Olympic Games 2024 in Paris. Her favourite apparatuses are ball and clubs. Outside the sporting hall her hobbies are drawing, painting and reading. She plans to study law or political sciences, she speaks French, English and Spanish.

== Career ==
Eleonore was included into the national senior group in 2019, she now trains for 40 hours per week at the National Institute for Sport, Expertise and Performance [INSEP] in Paris.

She made it to the starting five in 2022, debuting at the World Cup in Athens where the group won All-Around gold. One month later, in April, they won bronze in both the All-Around and 5 hoops in Sofia. In June Eleonore and the group travelled to Pesaro, being 6th in the All-Around and 4th with 5 hoops. Ten days later she competed at the 2022 European Championships in Tel Aviv along the senior group, seniors Hélène Karbanov and Lily Ramonatxo and juniors Chloé Ineze, Shana Loxton-Vernaton, Margot Tran, where France was 6th in the All-Around, 7th in the 5 hoops final and 5th in the 3 ribbons + 2 balls' one. In September Caburet made her World Championships debut in Sofia along Emma Delaine, Ainhoa Dot, Manelle Inaho, Ashley Julien, Lozea Vilarino and the two individuals Hélène Karbanov and Maelle Millet, taking 11th place in the All-Around.

In 2023 the group was 8th in the All-Around and 5th with 3 balls + 2 ribbons in Athens, in Sofia they won 3 bronze medals. In April she competed in Baku, the group was 8th in the All-Around and 6th with hoops. In April the girls won all the gold medals at the tournament in Thiais. It was later revealed she was among the selected gymnasts for the European Championships in Baku along Emma Delaine, Manelle Inaho, Lozea Vilarino, Celia Joseph-Noel, Justine Lavit and the individuals Hélène Karbanov and Maelle Millet. In May, at the stage in Portimão, they won a silver medal in the 3 ribbon and 2 hoops final.
