= Ashley Julien =

French rhythmic gymnast

- Born: 29 December 2004 (age 21) Saint-Aubin-lès-Elbeuf, France

Gymnastics career
- Discipline: Rhythmic gymnastics
- Country represented: France (2020-)
- Club: Normandie Regroupement Gymnique
- Head coach: Anna Baranova
- Assistant coach: Sara Bayón
- Former coach: Géraldine Pinson
- Choreographer: Gregory Milan
Medal record
Rhythmic gymnastics
Representing France
Event	1st	2nd	3rd
FIG World Cup	1	0	2
Total	1	0	2

Ashley Julien (born 29 December 2004) is a French rhythmic gymnast, member of the French national group.

== Personal life ==
Julien took up the sport at age 10, she now trains for 40 hours per week at the National Institute for Sport, Expertise and Performance [INSEP] in Paris, her dream is to be part of the group that will represent France at the 2024 Olympics Games. When she retires she plans of becoming a school teacher.

== Career ==
Ashley was included into the national senior group in 2020, she made it to the starting five in 2021 debuting at the World Championships in Kitakyushu, they were 11th in the All-Around, 12th with 3 hoops + 4 clubs and 8th in the final with 5 balls.

In 2022, debuting at the World Cup in Athens where the group won All-Around gold. One month later, in April, they won bronze in both the All-Around and 5 hoops in Sofia. In June Ashley and the group travelled to Pesaro, being 6th in the All-Around and 4th with 5 hoops. Ten days later she competed at the 2022 European Championships in Tel Aviv along the senior group, seniors Hélène Karbanov and Lily Ramonatxo and juniors Chloé Ineze, Shana Loxton-Vernaton, Margot Tran, where France was 6th in the All-Around, 7th in the 5 hoops final and 5th in the 3 ribbons + 2 balls' one. In September Julien took part in the World Championships in Sofia along Eleonore Caburet, Ainhoa Dot, Manelle Inaho, Emma Delaine, Lozea Vilarino and the two individuals Hélène Karbanov and Maelle Millet, taking 11th place in the All-Around.
