= Manelle Inaho =

French rhythmic gymnast

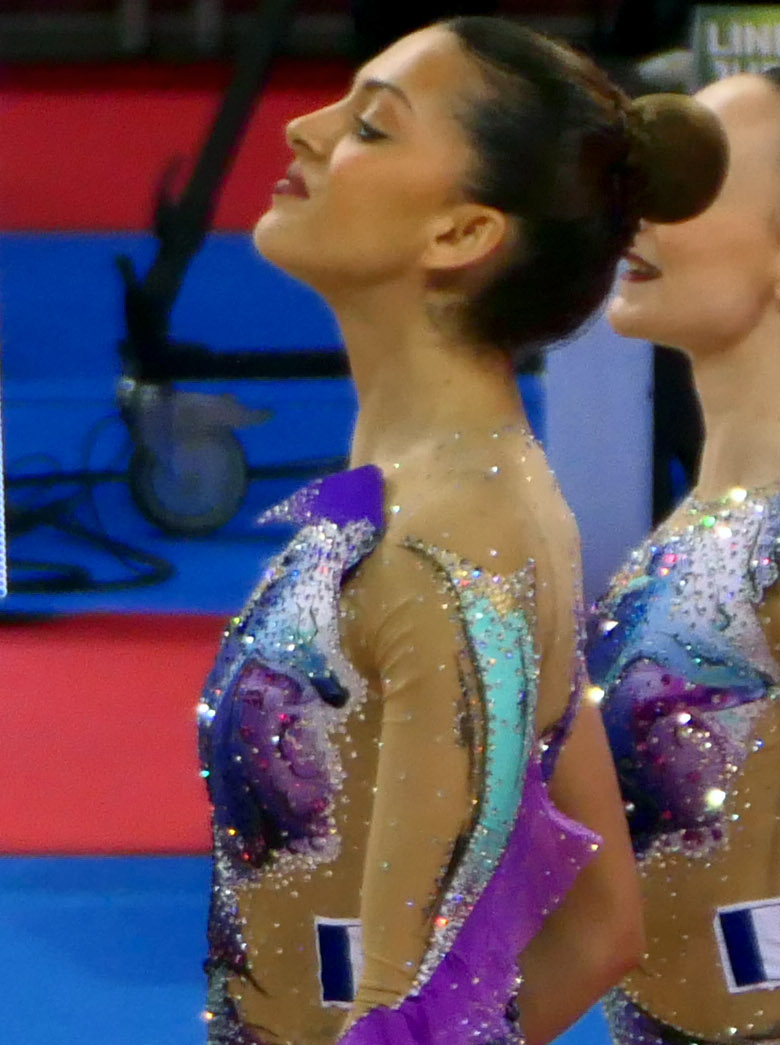
- Inaho in 2024

Personal information
- Born: 26 September 2003 (age 23) Villeneuve Saint Georges, France

Gymnastics career
- Discipline: Rhythmic gymnastics
- Country represented: France; (2018-)
- Club: SCA 2000 Évry
- Head coach: Anna Baranova
- Assistant coach: Sara Bayón
- Former coach: Didi Anguelova
- Choreographer: Gregory Milan
Medal record
Rhythmic gymnastics
Representing France
Event	1st	2nd	3rd
FIG World Cup	1	1	5
Total	1	1	7

Manelle Inaho (born 26 September 2003) is a French rhythmic gymnast and a member of the French national group.

== Personal life ==
Inaho first tried gymnastics at age three, she now trains for 40 hours per week at the National Institute for Sport, Expertise and Performance [INSEP] in Paris. Her ambition is to be part of the French group that will compete at the Olympic Games 2024. Her sister Nour is also a rhythmic gymnast who has taken part in national competitions in France. Her favourite apparatuses are hoop and clubs. Outside the sporting hall her hobbies are reading, shopping, going to the movies, theatre, opera, listening to music, going for walks. She speaks French, Arabic, English, Russian, Spanish.

== Career ==
Manelle was included into the national team in 2018 when she was selected for the 2018 European Championships in Guadalajara, she competed with hoop and clubs finishing 69th in the All-Around, 13th with hoop and 14th with clubs. She was affected by injury during the 2019/20 winter and couldn't take part in competitions. In 2021 she entered the rooster of the national team, participating at the World Championships in Kitakyushu, they were 11th in the All-Around, 12th with 3 hoops + 4 clubs and 8th in the final with 5 balls.

In 2022, debuting at the World Cup in Athens where the group won All-Around gold. One month later, in April, they won bronze in both the All-Around and 5 hoops in Sofia. In June Manelle and the group travelled to Pesaro, being 6th in the All-Around and 4th with 5 hoops. Ten days later she competed at the 2022 European Championships in Tel Aviv, where France was 6th in the All-Around, 7th in the 5 hoops final and 5th in the 3 ribbons + 2 balls' one. In September Inaho took part in the World Championships in Sofia along Eleonore Caburet, Ainhoa Dot, Emma Delaine, Ashley Julien, Lozea Vilarino and the two individuals Hélène Karbanov and Maelle Millet, taking 11th place in the All-Around.

In 2023 the group was 8th in the All-Around and 5th with 3 balls + 2 ribbons in Athens, in Sofia they won 3 bronze medals. In April she competed in Baku, the group was 8th in the All-Around and 6th with hoops. In April the girls won all the gold medals at the tournament in Thiais. It was later revealed she was among the selected gymnasts for the European Championships in Baku along Eleonore Caburet, Emma Delaine, Justine Lavit, Lozea Vilarino, Celia Joseph-Noel and the individuals Hélène Karbanov and Maelle Millet. In May, at the stage in Portimão, they won a silver medal in the 3 ribbon and 2 hoops final.
