= Charles Cazalet =

President of the Union of Gymnastics Societies of France

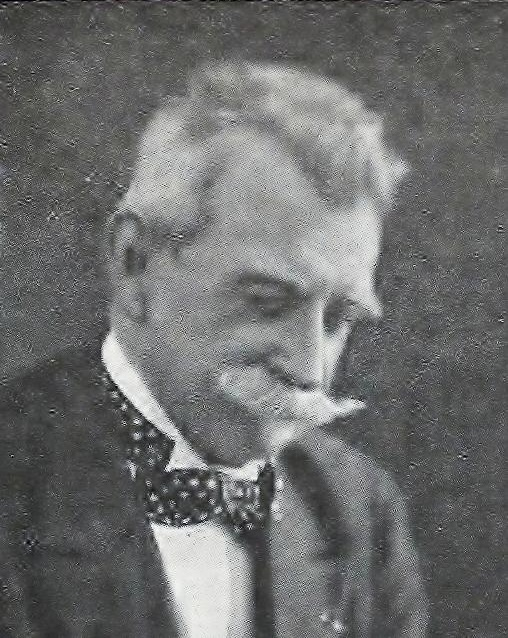
- Charles Cazalet circa 1900.
- Born: June 22, 1858; Cenon, Gironde
- Died: January 18, 1933 (aged 74); Bordeaux
- Occupation: President of USGF (1897-1931) FIG President (1924-1933)
- Awards: Grand officer of the Legion of Honor; Officer des palmes académiques

Charles Cazalet (June 22, 1858 – January 18, 1933) was president of the Union of Gymnastics Societies of France from 1896 to 1931 and of the International Gymnastics Federation from 1924 to 1933.

Son of a Protestant family of Bordeaux wine merchants, Cazalet worked in the family business after completing his studies at the Lycée de Bordeaux. A philanthropic businessman, he initiated several social measures and created the first neighborhood gymnastics association. Elected to the Bordeaux city council, he took advantage of this mandate to innovate by creating popular shower baths, low-cost housing, and allotments. Then, without neglecting his professional commitments, he devoted himself more specifically to the development of gymnastics. President of the Union des sociétés de gymnastique de France in 1897, he held this position for 34 years, adding in 1924 the presidency of the new International Gymnastics Federation, which he held until he died in 1933.

== Biography ==
Charles Cazalet, a major figure in Bordeaux, is intimately linked to the city's life at the beginning of the 20th century. He was born in Cenon on June 22, 1858, into a Protestant family of wine merchants. Married in 1885 to Alice Hauchecorne, he had three children, including a son killed in the First World War on September 3, 1916.

=== Professional and civic commitments ===
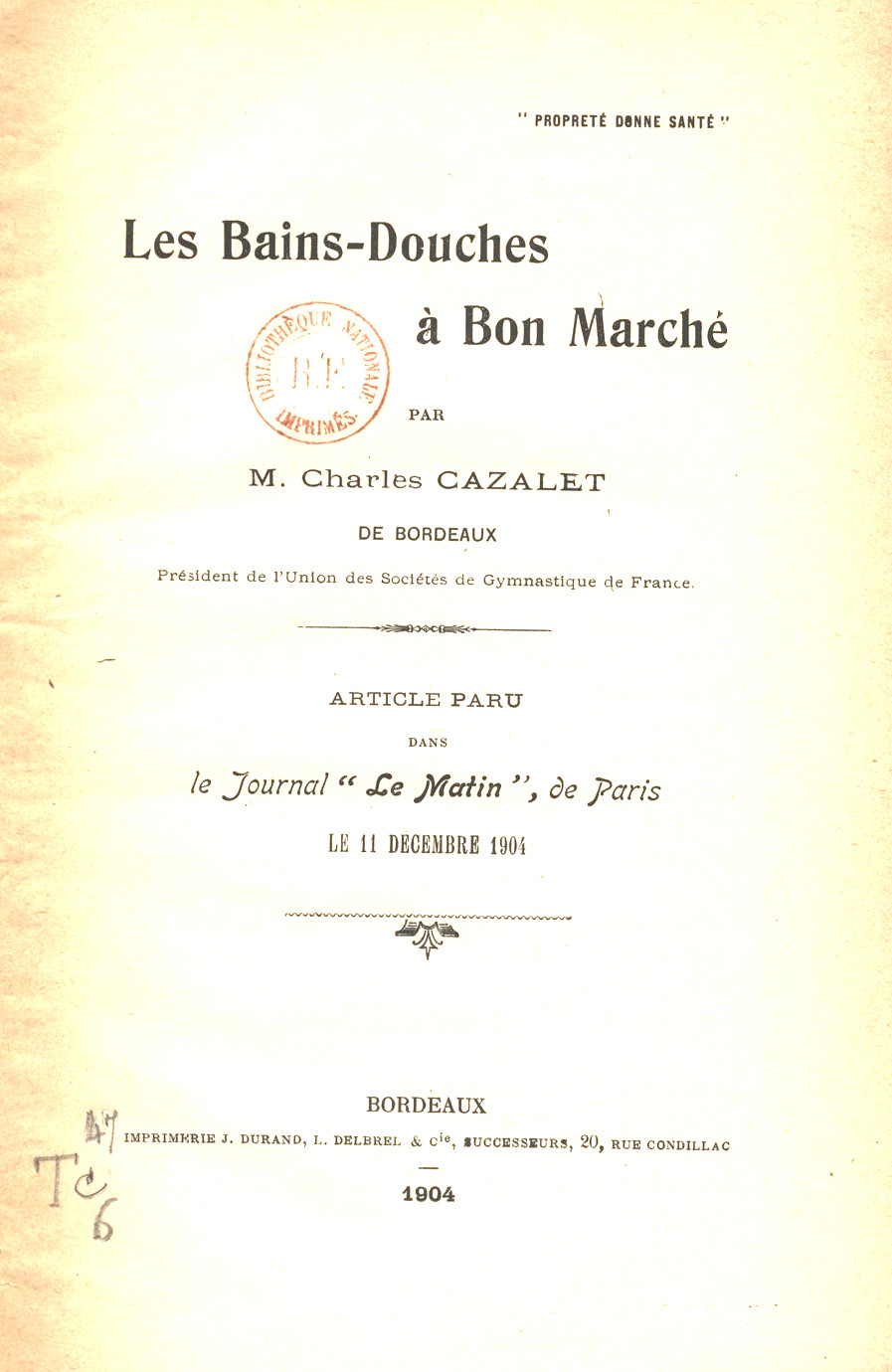
Charles Cazalet and the promotion of bains-douches.

After studying at the Lycée de Bordeaux, he began assisting his father in 1878, introducing a profit-sharing scheme for employees. In 1881, he became secretary of the Chambre syndicale du commerce en gros des vins et spiritueux de la Gironde. A true social patron, his convictions led him to found and preside over the La Bastidienne gymnastics society in 1884, to invigorate the neighborhood of his neighbors and employees. In 1887, he took over the management of the family businessC 2. In 1893, he founded and chaired the Société anonyme du pont à transbordeur de Bordeaux. In 1908, he chaired the Syndicat général du commerce d'importation et d'exportation de Bordeaux, the Comité régional des conseillers du commerce extérieur and was vice-president of the Comité national.

Married in 1889, he also became involved in social issues, helping his young wife to found the La Bastide crèche in 1891, the same year he organized a public heating system for the underprivileged during a particularly harsh winter. Elected to the Bordeaux city council and deputy mayor from 1892 to 1896, he made a considerable contribution to improving the situation of his fellow citizens. On April 13, 1892, he was responsible for setting up the Œuvre bordelaise des bains-douches à bon marché (Bordeaux low-cost shower-baths charity), chaired by the mayor of Bordeaux and of which he was general secretary. This was the starting point for the public shower-bath establishments invented sometime earlier for prisons. From 1899 onwards, he imported them to the capital, from where they spread to other cities.

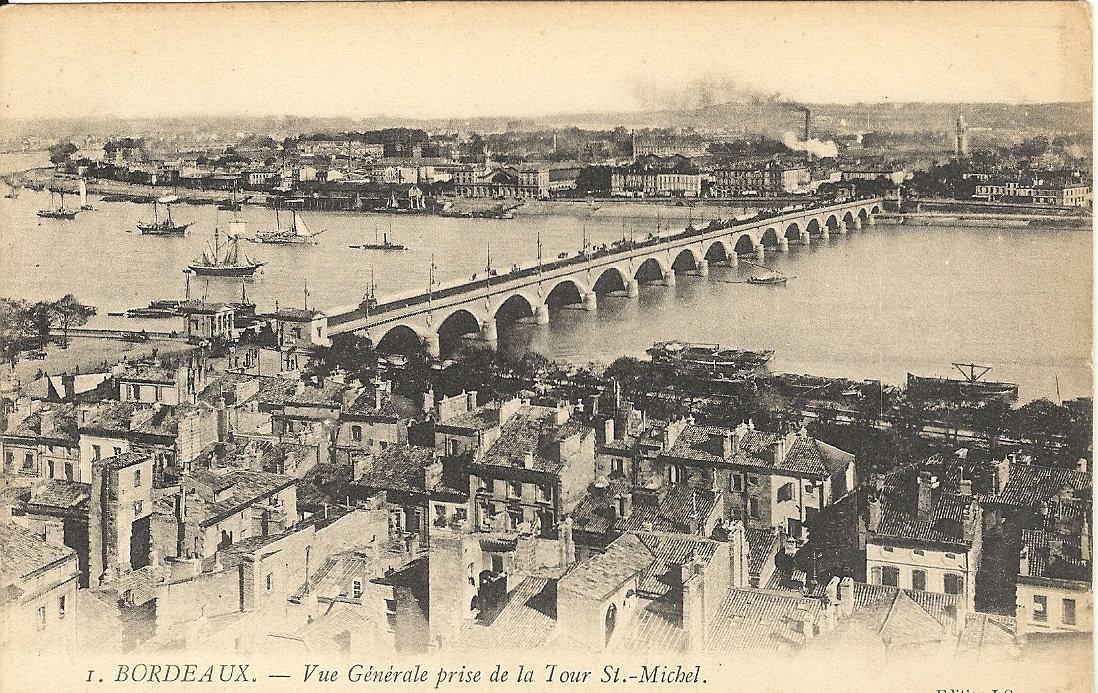
View of the Bastide district in 1907, from the Saint-Michel tower.

On the following December 28, he founded the Société bordelaise des habitations à bon marché, which expanded rapidly from 1902 onwards. Although he gave up his municipal duties in 1896, perhaps disillusioned with political life, he remained faithful to his social and civic commitments right to the end. In 1905 he founded the Œuvre bordelaise des jardins ouvriers and in 1911 the Société de crédit immobilier de Gironde. The same year, he joined the Board of Governors of the Ligue de l'enseignement. In 1918, he created the Banque Populaire de la Gironde, and in 1927 opened the Clinique de La Bastide. According to Jean-Paul Callède, “Cazalet is unquestionably one of the Bordeaux personalities who contributed most to the evolution of local society under the Third Republic”. However, Cazalet's fame extended beyond the city and its major achievements, for from 1896 to 1931, he acquired a national dimension by becoming president of the Union des sociétés de gymnastique de France (USGF), which he transformed from a patriotic educational organization into a sports organization.

In 1929, Maison Cazalet et fils was hit hard by the economic crisis, and Charles Cazalet, affected by the death of his wife, relinquished the main responsibilities he had held until then.

=== Republic gymnastics ===
Indeed, gymnastics was to be the best means of expressing his commitment. In 1873, his parents enrolled him in the Bordeaux Gymnastics Society, where he was a student instructor in 1878 and a member of the board of directors in 1881. In 1884, he founded and chaired La Bastidienne, Bordeaux's first popular gymnastics society. The following year, he helped organize the XIth Fête Fédérale in Bordeaux: to this end, his Bordeaux friend Daniel Merillon (Note: Pierre-François-Daniel Mérillon (1852, Bordeaux-1925, Nontron) was a lawyer at the Bordeaux bar, deputy mayor from 1878 to 1884 and deputy for Gironde in 1885. He was also founding president of the Union nationale des sociétés de tir de France in 1886, vice-president of the Société d'encouragement à l'escrime and honorary president of the Société aérostatique et météorologique de France. Grand Cross of the Légion d'honneur) had been elected President of the USGF at the Fête Fédérale in Amiens the previous year. Cazalet also set up the first instructors' course in Bordeaux. In 1890, he was rapporteur for the finance committee of the USGF, whose presidency and board changed with each federal festival. At the 1893 Congrès de l'éducation physique, he spoke in defense of gymnastics and the games.

In 1894, La Bastidienne inaugurated its new gymnasium in the presence of Joseph Sansboeuf, and the following year, Cazalet again became rapporteur for the USGF finance committee. He was elected president in 1897, after helping to revise the statutes. Up until the dawn of the 20th century, the USGF was primarily a think-tank whose steering committee boasted the scientific, political, literary, and media luminaries of the day. Proud of the organization of its major federal festivities since 1875, it nevertheless remained reserved, to say the least, about sporting competition per se, in line with the positions of the European board chaired by the Belgian Cupérus. As a result, only one French gymnast took part in the gymnastics tournament at the Athens Olympic Games in 1896. Charles Cazalet took over the presidency a year later, a position he held until 1931.

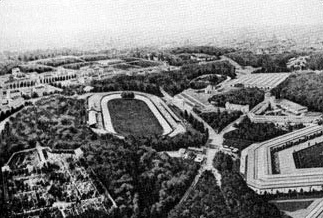
During the 1900 Olympic Games, the USGF federal festival inaugurates the new Vincennes velodrome.

In 1900, at the Paris Olympics, gymnastics, along with cycling, was the most popular sport in France. It was also at the heart of the Third Republic's physical and moral education and, according to Jules Ferry, the true “peaceful avant-garde of the fatherland in arms”. On June 3 and 4, the USGF inaugurated the brand-new Vincennes velodrome with its federal festival, attended by 8,050 gymnasts from all over France. The ensuing international competition, held on July 29 and 30 as part of the Universal Exhibition, was won by Gustave Sandras and was a great success for the French gymnasts, who relegated the first foreigner, a Swiss, to 18th place. On September 2, the competition organized by the Association des Sociétés de Gymnastique de la Seine brought the gymnastics festivities to a close. Cazalet, already convinced of the value of competition, capitalized on the craze and lobbied the European office for the regular organization of gymnastics competitions.

At the same time, he was determined to make the opportunity a permanent one in France, and invited the painter Octave Denis Victor Guillonnet to the next federal festival in Nice on April 7 and 8, 1901. 3,000 French gymnasts marched past Gambetta's tomb in a solemn national tribute. He arranged for the work immortalizing the moment to be etched and reproduced on a large scale. In a letter to Étienne Dujardin-Beaumetz, Under-Secretary of State at the Ministry of Fine Arts, dated October 2, 1909, he stated his objective: “propaganda engravings which, I believe, would serve admirably the patriotic cause to which we are attached; the memory of this great event, the ideas it evokes, the memory of Gambetta and the defense of the nation are all radiating forces to further increase the patriotic and republican feelings of all our youth”. In 1905, he organized the Fête Fédérale in Bordeaux, in the presence of Émile Loubet, President of the Republic, and again to mark the inauguration of a monument to Gambetta.

=== Sports development at USGF ===
On April 12, 1903, the USGF was recognized as a public utility and the first international tournament was held in Antwerp under the aegis of the European office. France took first place in the team event. The USGF had entered the sporting era, and President Charles Cazalet took charge of the next tournament, held in Bordeaux in 1905 on the occasion of the Fête Fédérale: France did it again and Marcel Lalue, from Limoges, won the individual ranking. In 1908, Charles Cazalet headed 100 French gymnasts to the London Games. Until the Great War, France disputed first place with Bohemia, never finishing higher than second. Individually, in addition to Lalue, Josef Martinez and Marco Torres reached the top of the podium, the latter twice. Like Martinez, Torres hails from Algeria, which quickly proved to be a region of gymnastic excellence. The USGF organized its French championship there in 1930 to celebrate the centenary of the Sidi-Ferruch landing.

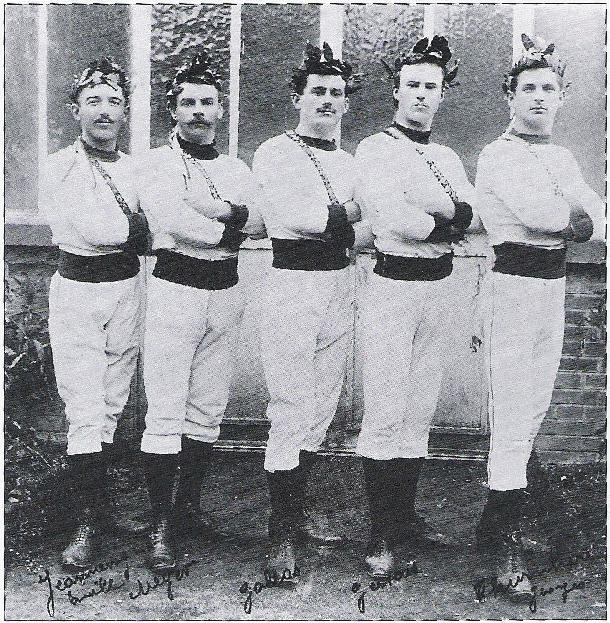
Team of Belfort gymnasts, circa 1920.

Cazalet attached great importance to the training of managers, most of whom were military personnel or former military personnel from the École de Joinville. To provide them with a higher level of training, in 1903 he financed the Cours Supérieur d'Education Physique created at the Sorbonne by Georges Demenÿ, Étienne-Jules Marey's assistant at the Parc des Princes physiological station. This course foreshadowed the university integration of teacher training. Attacked by his compatriot Philippe Tissié, Demenÿ saw the dispute temporarily turn to his advantage. The USGF's main objective remained patriotic, and it played a major role in providing the nation with the soldiers it was hoping for to ensure its revenge, thus securing all the ministerial support it needed. To this end, its competition program remains above all collective and highly eclectic. Champion titles are decided just as much in the pole vault or the sledgehammer as in the high bar; even at the world championships, this continued to be the case until 1954. Only the Olympic Games tournaments were limited to gymnastic apparatus.

The USGF, which comprised 1,100 associations in 1914, was exclusively male. In 1912, the Union française des sociétés de gymnastique féminine was created, followed in 1916 by the Fédération de sociétés féminines françaises de gymnastique et des sports (FSFFGS) and then, on October 12 of the same year, the Fédération féminine française de gymnastique et d'éducation physique (FFFGEP). One hundred thousand gymnasts were killed in the First World War, during which Cazalet distinguished himself as a senior officer and lost his only son. Nevertheless, in June 1919, the USGF was able to organize the first post-war federal festival in Nancy, which had returned to the bosom of France.

Under his presidency, the USGF also invested in the colonial Empire: in his book, Jean Latte cites Algéria-Sports and the Tricolore de Dakar among the USGF's major associations. Although the USGF had already organized its federal festival in Algiers in 1896, it returned there in 1930 to celebrate the 100th anniversary of the conquest of Algeria. However, international results declined: France fell back to third place at the international tournaments in Ljubljana in 1922 and Lyon in 1926, before moving up to second place in 1930 in Luxembourg. From the following year onwards, international tournaments gave way to world championships, and France fell back again in the overall rankings.

During this period, the USGF remained a strong showcase for the defense of the republican ideal, and Cazalet mobilized his federal party whenever necessary: in 1929 in Orleans to mark the secular state's claim to Joan of Arc as a national heroine, and in 1931 in Paris for the Paris International Colonial Exhibition.

Despite his services, his never-ending duel with Tissié and his medical colleagues finally turned to his disadvantage in 1923: the higher education course fell out of the hands of the USGF, which had to give up the right to govern the training of physical education teachers. Cazalet refocused on training the gymnastics managers of his associations, and from 1927 onwards the USGF organized an annual course for civilian instructors in Dinard. The course was moved to Saint-Maur during the Occupation. In 1931, Cazalet, suffering from his professional setbacks, stepped down as president and died two years later.

== Notoriety ==
=== International dimensions ===
His relations with the Czech sokols led to his appointment as Czechoslovak consul in Bordeaux, and his professional connections enabled him to expatriate the federal festival to North Africa on three occasions (Algiers in 1896 and 1930, Tunis in 1912). In 1924, at the Paris Congress, Charles Cazalet, vice-president of the Bureau des fédérations européennes de gymnastique (BFEG) since 1910 succeeded the Belgian Cupérus at the head of the Fédération internationale de gymnastique (FIG), which had replaced the BFEG founded in 1881 two years earlier. He became its second president and remained in office until he died in 1933. It was during his term of office that the biennial international tournament was transformed into the Gymnastics World Championships in 1931. These were then organized in Paris by the international federation itself.

=== Awards ===
He was promoted to the rank of officier d'académie in 1886, and officier de l'Instruction publique in 1895. He received the medal of honor from the Société nationale d'encouragement au bien in 1895 and the gold medal from Assistance publique in 1908.

The recipient of numerous foreign awards, his promotion to the Legion of Honor was meteoric: knight in 1896, officer in 1900, and commander in 1912. This last promotion was confirmed in 1919 to Lieutenant-Colonel Charles Cazalet for his exemplary behavior at Verdun and on the Somme. In 1923, he was awarded the plaque of Grand Officer.

In 1931, he was awarded a Grand Prix at the Paris International Colonial Exhibition.

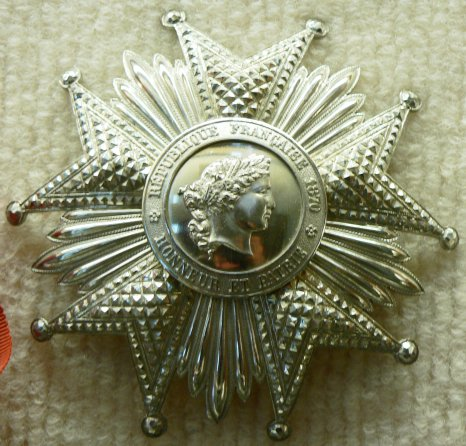
Grand Officer of the Legion of Honor plaque

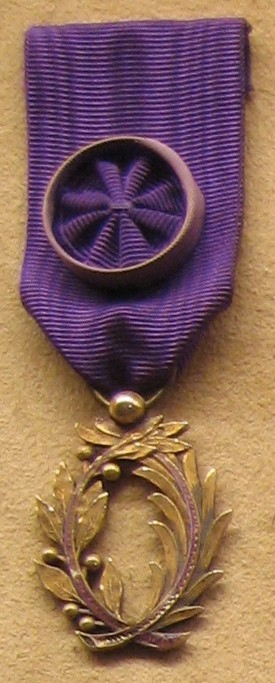
Médaille d'officier des palmes académiques

== See also ==
- Legion of Honor
- French Gymnastics Federation

== Bibliography ==
- Barrull, Raymond (1984). Les étapes de la gymnastique au sol et aux agrès en France et dans le monde. Paris: Fédération française de gymnastique. ISBN 978-2-9500603-0-3.
- Bourzac, Albert (2004). Les bataillons scolaires, 1880-1891, l'éducation militaire à l'école de la République. Paris: l’Harmattan. ISBN 2-7475-6975-6.
- Cabanel, Patrick; Encrevé, André; Société d'histoire du protestantisme français (2015). Dictionnaire biographique des protestants français de 1787 à nos jours, coll. « Bibliothèque PR ». Paris: Les Éditions de Paris-Max Chaleil. ISBN 978-2-84621-190-1.
- Callède, Jean-Paul (1999). "Charles Cazalet (1858-1933), patron bordelais. Philanthropie, réseaux d'action sociale et modernisation de la vie locale". Bulletin d'histoire de la sécurité sociale. ISSN 0982-6300.
- Cazalet, Charles (1904). Les Bains-Douches à bon marché, Bordeaux. L. Delbrel.
- Deleplace, Jean-Michel (1999). Le sportif, l'entraîneur, le dirigeant, xixe et xxe siècle. Paris: l'Harmattan. ISBN 2-7384-7649-X.
- Guérin, Jean; Guérin, Bernard; Mauriac, François (1957). Des hommes et des activités autour d'un demi-siècle. BEB.
- Latte, Jean (1948). La gymnastique. Paris: Vigot.
- Piard, Claude (2001). Éducation physique et sport: petit manuel d'histoire élémentaire. l’Harmattan. ISBN 2-7475-1744-6.
