= Justine Lavit =

French rhythmic gymnast

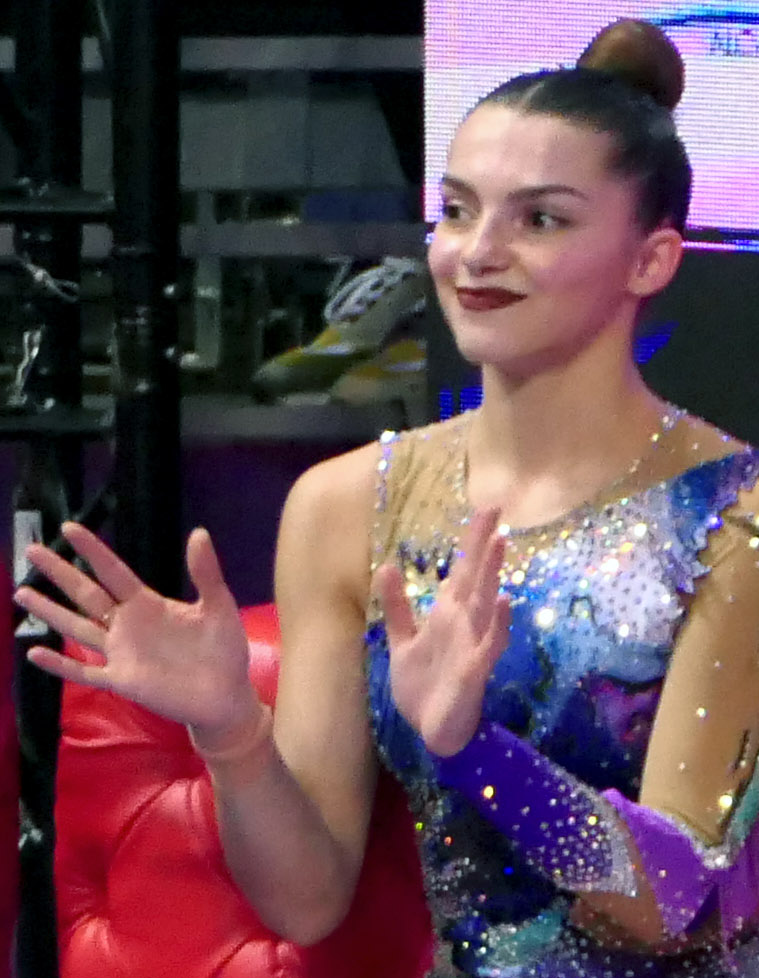
- Lavit at the 2024 Sofia World Cup

Personal information
- Born: 19 July 2006 (age 20) Tarbes, France

Gymnastics career
- Discipline: Rhythmic gymnastics
- Country represented: France; (2021-2025)
- Club: G.R.S Odos
- Head coach: Anna Baranova
- Assistant coach: Sara Bayón
- Choreographer: Gregory Milan
- Retired: yes
Medal record
Rhythmic gymnastics
Representing France
Event	1st	2nd	3rd
FIG World Cup	0	1	3
Total	0	1	3
Group Rhythmic Gymnastics
European Championships
Silver medal – second place	2025 Tallinn	5 Ribbons

Justine Lavit (born 19 July 2006) is a French retired rhythmic gymnast who was a member of the national group. She competed in the group event at the 2024 Summer Olympics.

== Career ==
=== Junior ===
Lavit competed as an individual up through the junior category. She participated in her first international competition in 2017 at age 11, and she was 13th at the junior national championships in 2019.

She began training in Montpellier in 2016. In October 2020, she participated in the selection process for the team for the European Championships in Kyiv at the National Institute for Sport, Expertise and Performance (INSEP). She placed third and was not selected. In January 2021, she won bronze at a review competition in Calais. In September, she began training at INSEP, trying to achieve her dream of competing at the 2024 Olympic Games.

=== Senior ===
Lavit began competing as part of the national senior group in 2022. In May, she was bothered by a foot injury. However, she competed at the Gymnasiade, and the group won silver in the all-around.

In March 2023 she debuted as a member of the group at the international tournament in Fellbach-Schmiden, where they took 6th place in both finals. Lavit only competed in the 5 hoops routine. She then participated in the World Cup in Sofia, replacing Ashley Julien, where France won three bronze medals. In April she competed in the World Cup in Baku. The group was 8th in the all-around and 6th with hoops. In April, the group won all three gold medals at the Grand Prix in Thiais.

She was among the selected gymnasts for the European Championships in Baku, along with fellow group members Eleonore Caburet, Emma Delaine, Manelle Inaho, Lozea Vilarino, Celia Joseph-Noel, and the individuals Hélène Karbanov and Maelle Millet. The group finished 7th with 5 hoops and 8th in the 3 ribbons + 2 balls final. She also competed at the 2023 World Championships, where she and the group had a particularly strong performance with 5 hoops and were able to win a quota for the 2024 Summer Olympics. A French group had not qualified for the Olympics in 24 years.

In April 2024, Lavit and the group won the gold medal in the 3 ribbons + 2 balls final as well as silver in the all-around at the World Cup in Tashkent. They also won bronze in the all-around and with 5 hoops at World Challenge Cup in Portimão. At the Grand Prix in Thiais in April, they again won gold in the all-around, as well as with 3 ribbons + 2 balls, and won bronze with 5 hoops. In May, at the European Championships, they finished in 11th place.

Lavit was the youngest member of the group at the Olympics. At the Olympics in August, the group had a strong performance in the qualification round and qualified for the final in 4th place. Lavit said the group was already very proud of themselves and commented on how exciting it was to compete in front of the French crowd. In the final, they scored several points lower and finished in 6th place.

Lavit was the only member of the group that competed at the Olympics to continue competing the next year. At the 2025 European Championships in Tallinn, Lavit and the French group placed 9th in the all-around and won silver medal in 5 ribbons final.

She announced her retirement from competition in January 2026, citing repeated foot injuries that did not heal as well as a back injury. She also noted that she struggled to recreate the same connections she had with the Olympic group in the newly formed 2025 group, which had made training less enjoyable.
