= Lozéa Vilarino =

French rhythmic gymnast

Lozea Vilarino
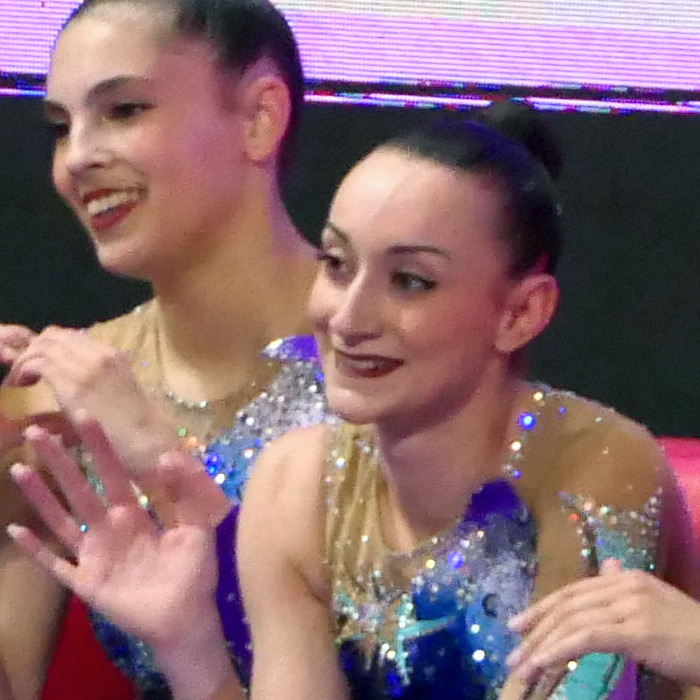
- Vilarino in 2024

Personal information
- Born: 3 February 2003 (age 23) Rillieux-la-Pape, France

Gymnastics career
- Discipline: Rhythmic gymnastics
- Country represented: France; (2017-)
- Club: Association Thionville Gymnastique Rythmique et Sportive
- Head coach: Anna Baranova
- Assistant coach: Sara Bayón
- Former coach: Katia Guillière
- Choreographer: Gregory Milan
Medal record
Rhythmic gymnastics
Representing France
Event	1st	2nd	3rd
FIG World Cup	1	1	5
Total	1	1	5

Lozea Vilarino (born 3 February 2003) is a French rhythmic gymnast, member of the French national group.

== Personal life ==
Vilarino took up the sport at age five in 2008, she now trains for 40 hours per week at the National Institute for Sport, Expertise and Performance [INSEP] in Paris, her dream is to be part of the group that will represent France at the 2024 Olympics Games. Her favourite apparatuses are hoop and clubs. Outside the sporting hall her hobbies are going to the movies, dancing. She speaks French, English, German and Russian, when she retires she plans of working in the medical field.

== Career ==
Even if Lozea was included into the national senior group in 2017, she made it to the starting five in 2021 debuting at the World Championships in Kitakyushu, they were 11th in the All-Around, 12th with 3 hoops + 4 clubs and 8th in the final with 5 balls.

In 2022, debuting at the World Cup in Athens where the group won All-Around gold. One month later, in April, they won bronze in both the All-Around and 5 hoops in Sofia. In June Lozea and the group travelled to Pesaro, being 6th in the All-Around and 4th with 5 hoops. Ten days later she competed at the 2022 European Championships in Tel Aviv, where France was 6th in the All-Around, 7th in the 5 hoops final and 5th in the 3 ribbons + 2 balls' one. In September Vilarino took part in the World Championships in Sofia along Eleonore Caburet, Ainhoa Dot, Manelle Inaho, Emma Delaine, Ashley Julien and the two individuals Hélène Karbanov and Maelle Millet, taking 11th place in the All-Around.

In 2023 the group was 8th in the All-Around and 5th with 3 balls + 2 ribbons in Athens, in Sofia they won 3 bronze medals. In April she competed in Baku, the group was 8th in the All-Around and 6th with hoops. In April the girls won all the gold medals at the tournament in Thiais. It was later revealed she was among the selected gymnasts for the European Championships in Baku along Eleonore Caburet, Emma Delaine, Manelle Inaho, Justine Lavit, Celia Joseph-Noel and the individuals Hélène Karbanov and Maelle Millet. In May, at the stage in Portimão, they won a silver medal in the 3 ribbon and 2 hoops final.
