= French Rhythmic Gymnastics Championships =

Annual rhythmic gymnastics competition

The French Rhythmic Gymnastics Championships French: Les championnats de France de gymnastique rythmique) are an annual rhythmic gymnastics competition, organized by the French Gymnastics Federation.

They usually take place at the same time as the men's and women's national championships in artistic gymnastics.

== Winners in the all-around ==
- 2026: Maëna Millon
- 2025: Maëna Millon
- 2024: Hélène Karbanov
- 2023: Maelle Millet
- 2022: Maelle Millet
- 2021: Maelle Millet
- ~~2020~~: Canceled due to the COVID-19 pandemic
- 2019: Célia Joseph-Noël
- 2018: Axelle Jovenin
- 2017: Kseniya Moustafaeva
- 2016: Kseniya Moustafaeva
- 2015: Kseniya Moustafaeva
- 2014: Kseniya Moustafaeva
- 2013: Kseniya Moustafaeva
- 2012: Delphine Ledoux
- 2011: Delphine Ledoux
- 2010: Delphine Ledoux
- 2009: Delphine Ledoux
- 2008: Delphine Ledoux
- 2007: Delphine Ledoux
- 2006: Delphine Ledoux
- 2005: Delphine Ledoux
- 2004: Delphine Ledoux
- 2003: Aurélie Lacour
- 2002: Aurélie Lacour
- 2001: Aurélie Lacour
- 2000: Aurélie Lacour
- 1999: Amélie Villeneuve
- 1998: Eva Serrano
- 1997: Eva Serrano
- 1996: Eva Serrano
- 1995: Eva Serrano
- 1994: Eva Serrano
- 1993: Eva Serrano
- 1992: Chrystelle Sahuc
- 1991: Chrystelle Sahuc
- 1990: Stéphanie Cottel
- 1989: Aurore Retuerto
- 1988: Stéphanie Cottel
- 1987: Annette Walle - Stéphanie Cottel - Emmanuelle Serre
- 1986: Annette Walle
- 1985: Annette Walle
- 1984: Annette Walle
- 1983: Benedicte Augst
- 1982: Benedicte Augst
- 1981: Martine Vital-Fournier
- 1980: Martine Vital
- 1979: Catherine Féraud
- 1978: Catherine Féraud
- 1977: Catherine Féraud
- 1976: Catherine Féraud
- 1975: Patricia Vanauld
- 1974: Josette Pinon-Bellanger
- 1973: Patricia Vanauld
- 1972: Patricia Vanauld
- 1971: Josette Pinon
- 1970: Marceline Mouren
- 1969: Marceline Mouren
- 1968: Anne-Marie Estivin

== See also ==
- French Gymnastics Championships
