= Célia Joseph-Noël =

French rhythmic gymnast

Celia Joseph-Noel
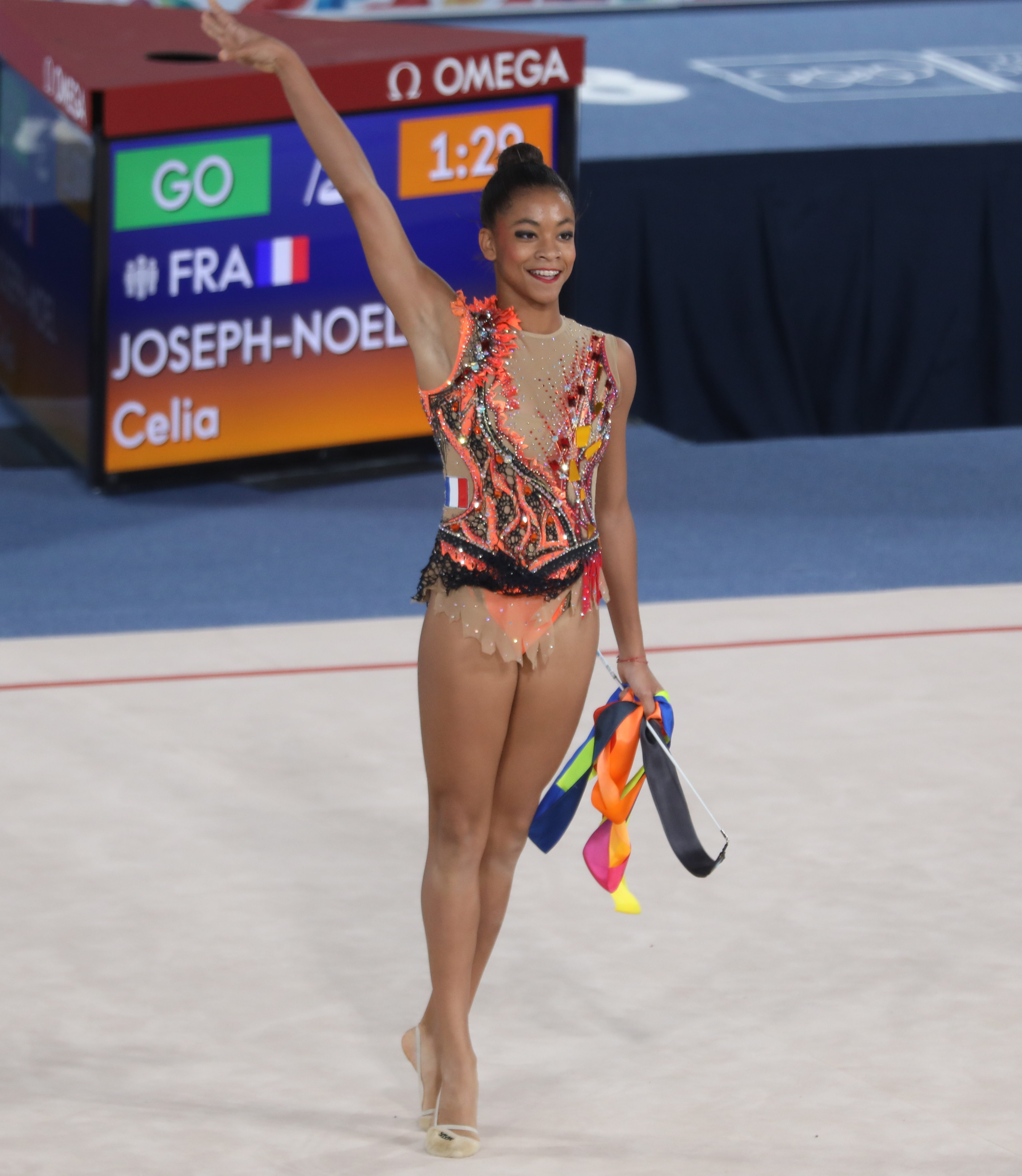

Personal information
- Born: 5 November 2003 (age 22) Paris, France

Gymnastics career
- Discipline: Rhythmic gymnastics
- Country represented: France; (2018-)
- Club: Issy Gymnastique Rythmique et Sportive
- Head coach: Anna Baranova
- Assistant coach: Sara Bayón
- Former coaches: Claire Munch, Julie Duboc
- Choreographer: Gregory Milan
Medal record
Rhythmic gymnastics
Representing France
Event	1st	2nd	3rd
FIG World Cup	0	1	0
Total	0	1	0

Celia Joseph-Noel (born 5 November 2003) is a French rhythmic gymnast, member of the national group. She was also the French representative at the Youth Olympics in 2018.

== Personal life ==
Joseph-Noel took up the sport at age six in Issy les Moulineaux; she now trains for 40 hours per week at the National Institute for Sport. Outside the gym, her hobbies are reading, going to the movies, and cooking. She plans to become a sports physician when she retires. She speaks French, English, and Spanish.

== Career ==
=== Junior ===
Joseph-Noel joined the national team in 2018 when she was selected for the European Championships in Guadalajara. She was 72nd in the all-around, and 8th in teams, with hoop and with ribbon. In October, she competed at the Youth Olympics in Buenos Aires, where she was 13th place.

=== Senior ===
In 2019 Joseph-Noel became a senior. Her first competition was the World Cup in Pesaro, where she finished 46th in the all-around. She then competed at the European Championships in Baku, finishing 39th in the all-around, 49th with hoop, 39th with ball, 46th with clubs and 40th with ribbon.

She ended her season and individual career by winning the French National Championship. The next season, she was invited to join the French group, and she accepted it as she enjoyed working with the other gymnasts as a team.

In 2021, she competed at the World Championships in Kitakyushu. The French group was 11th in the all-around, 8th with 5 balls and 12th with 3 hoops and 2 pairs of clubs.

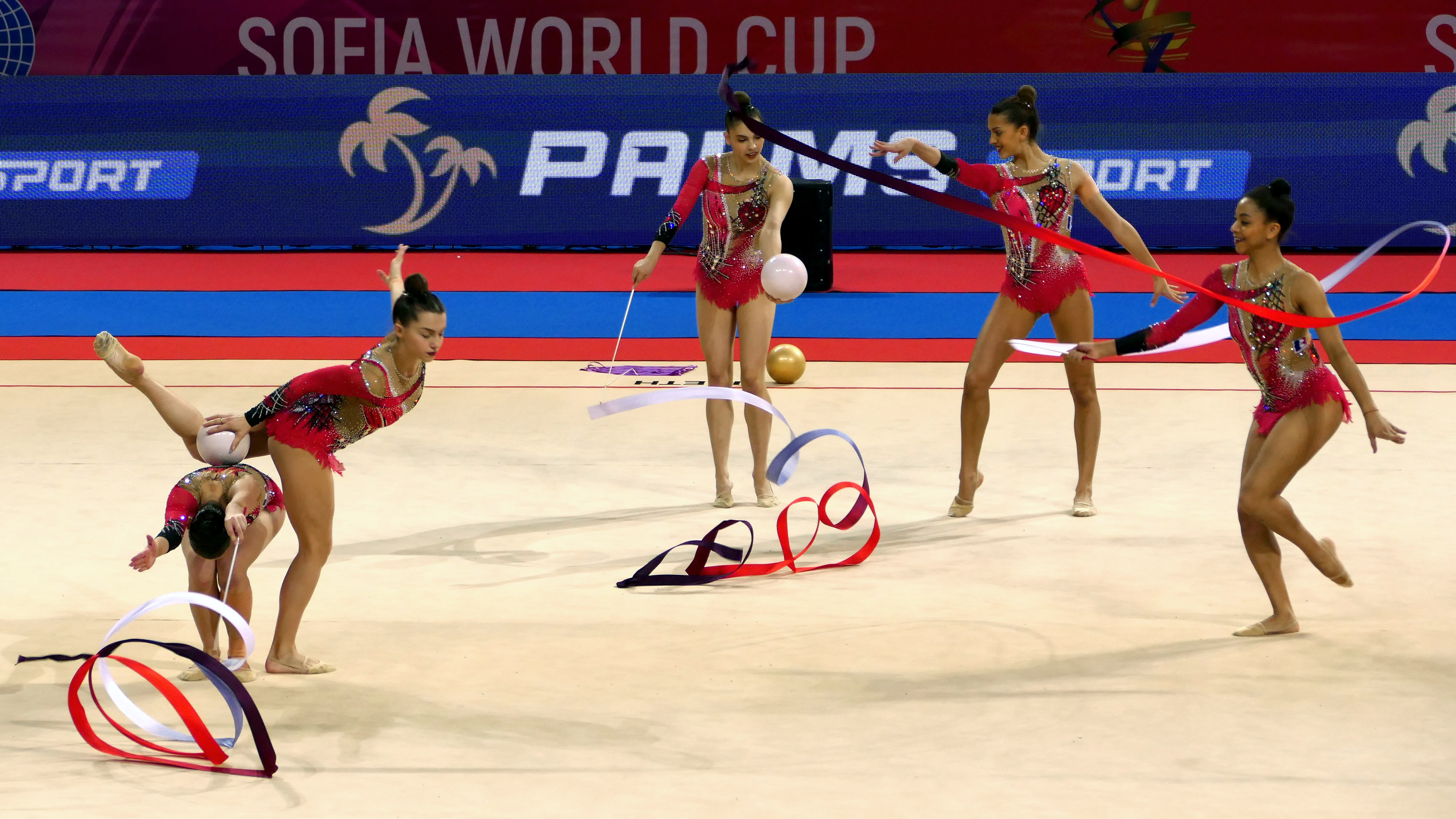
Joseph-Noel (far right) competing at the 2024 Sofia World Cup

On 27 April 2023, she replaced Ainhoa Dot in the roster of the World Cup in Portimão. As a member of the group, she won a silver medal in the 3 ribbon and 2 hoops final. It was also announced she was among the selected gymnasts for the European Championships in Baku along with fellow group gymnasts Eleonore Caburet, Emma Delaine, Manelle Inaho, Lozea Vilarino, Justine Lavit and the individuals Hélène Karbanov and Maelle Millet. The French group was 10th in the all-around and qualified to compete in both event finals.

In 2024, she competed at the 2024 World Cup in Sofia and was part of the group in both events of the qualifying round. The French group placed 4th in the all-around and qualified to both event finals. At the 2024 European Championships, the French group placed 11th in the all-around. They qualified for the 5 hoops final and finished in 8th place.
