= Aurélie Lacour =

French rhythmic gymnast

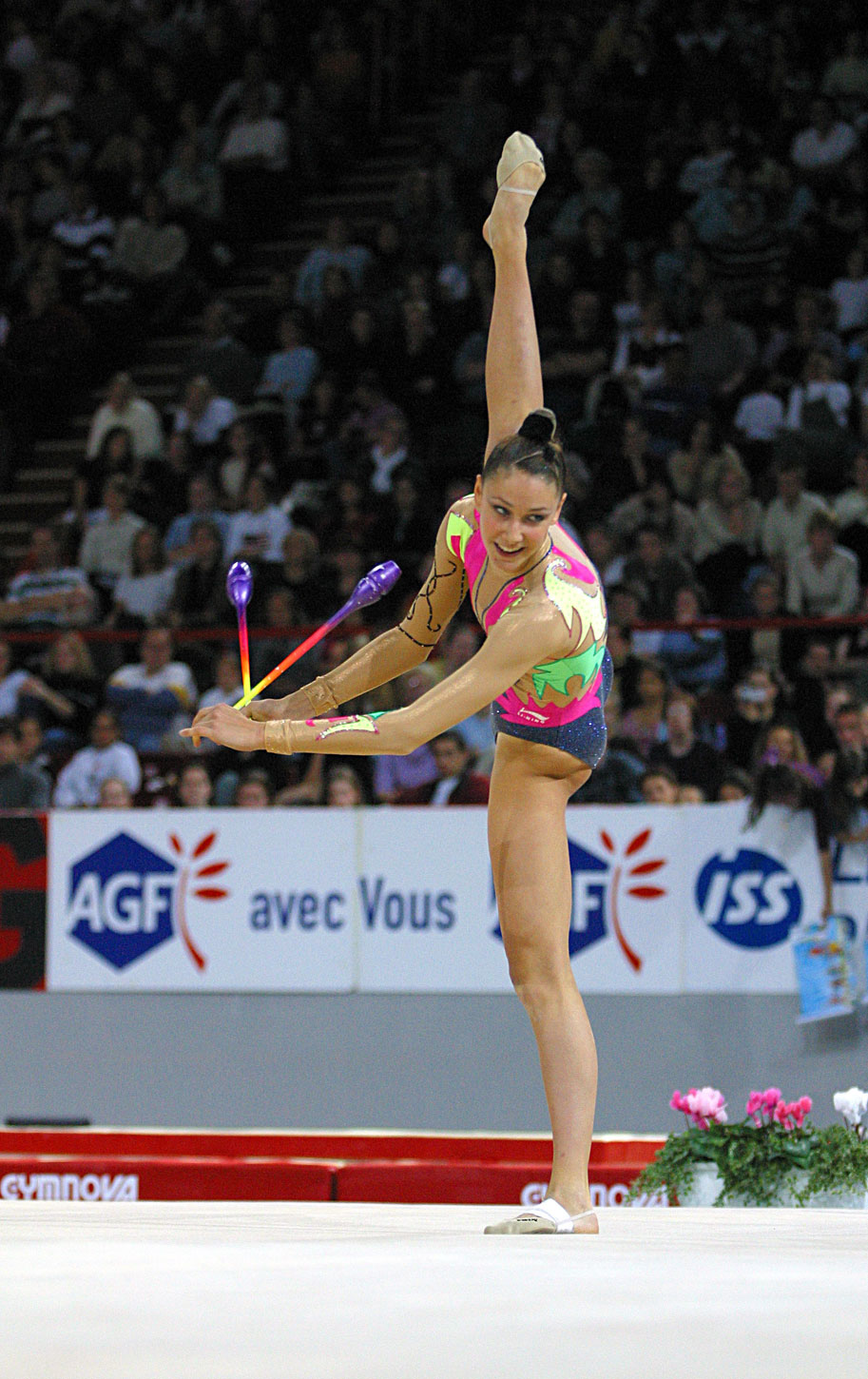

Personal information
- Born: 24 June 1984 (age 42) Trappes, France
- Height: 171 cm (5 ft 7 in)

Gymnastics career
- Discipline: Rhythmic gymnastics
- Country represented: France (1997-2008)
- Club: Corbeil-Essonnes / Pôle d'Evry
- Head coaches: Géraldine Miche, Nadia Mimoun, Clément Bouchonnet
- Former coach: Dimitrina Angelova
- Retired: yes

Aurélie Lacour (born 24 June 1984) is a former French rhythmic gymnast. She represented her country in international competitions.

== Personal life ==
Lacour took up rhythmic gymnastics at age 6 in Corbeil-Essonnes, During her career her strengths were expression, dynamism, originality and apparatus handling. Her favorite apparatuses were ribbon and ball. Her dream was to compete at the 2008 Olympic Games. She has one brother and one sister.

== Career ==
Aurélie had been training at the Évry Pole since the age of 7, a year after discovering the sport. She entered the French junior team in 1997. Her first international competition was the Cerceau d'Or tournament in Bulgaria where she was 9th. She was 8th at the French Rhythmic Gymnastics Championships in the junior category. In 1998 she was 8th at the Gymnasiada in Shangai, 9th at the Portimao International Tournament, 18th at the World Youth Games in Moscow and won gold at the Vienna International Tournament. That same year she won silver at nationals.

In 1999 Lacour debuted in the senior category at the Corbeil international tournament and made her World Championships debut in Osaka, finishing 10th in team and 40th in the All-Around. At the French Championships she won silver in the All-Around (behind Amélie Villeneuve) and ball, and gold with rope, hoop and ribbon

She was selected for the 2000 European Championships in Zaragoza, where she was 7th in the team competition. She also competed at the pre Olympic event in Sydney ending in 21st place. At national level she won All-Around gold as well as in every event final.

With the start of the new Olympic cycle Aurélie competed at the 2001 European Championships in Geneva, where she was 17th with ball, 15th with clubs, 10th with hoop and 13th with rope. In October she took part in the World Championships in Madrid finishing 11th in the team competition and 25th in the All-Around. Aurélie retained her gold medal at the French Championships.

In 2002 she won again gold at nationals in the All-Around, with clubs, ball and hoop. as well as bronze with rope. Lacour took also part in the European Championships in Granada, she was 9th in teams with Delphine Ledoux and 22nd in the All-Around.

She became once again national champion in 2003, winning gold with clubs and ribbon and silver hoop and ball. In September she competed at the World Championships in Budapest along Nathalie Fauquette and Ketty Martel, finishing 21st in the team category and 115th in the All-Around as she had for forfeit after two apparatuses.

Lacour rested the whole season in 2004, competing again in 2005. That year she was the national runner-up behind Ledoux, also winning silver with rope, ribbon and clubs and bronze with ball. She teamed up with Ledoux for the European Championships in Moscow, she was 14th in teams, 32nd with ball, 29th with rope, 26th with clubs and 27th with ribbon. Later she took part in the Mediterranean Games in Almeria, finishing 13th in the All-Around. In October she was selected for the World Championships in Baku ending 12th in the team competition, 37th in the All-Around, 40th with rope, 51st with ball, 32nd with clubs and 31st with ribbon.

In 2006 she switched to the national group, debuting at the Thiais tournament ending 6th with both 5 ribbons and 3 hoops + 4 clubs. The group participated in the World Cup stage in Genoa, they were 8th with 5 ribbons and 6th with 3 hoops + 4 clubs. The group also competed at the European Championships in Moscow taking 6th place in the All-Around and 8th in the 5 ribbons' final.

In 2007 Aurélie and the group competed at the World Championships in Patras, they were 16th in the All-Around, thanks to a bad execution of their 3 hoops + 4 clubs' routine that ranked them 22nd, and therefore they didn't qualify for the Beijing Olympics, they were 8th in the 5 ropes finals.

Aurélie retired at the end of the year.
