= Shana Loxton-Vernaton =

French rhythmic gymnast

- Born: 21 May 2007 (age 19) Chalon-sur-Saône, France

Gymnastics career
- Discipline: Rhythmic gymnastics
- Country represented: France; (2021-)
- Club: Dynamique Bisontine
- Head coach: Anna Baranova
- Assistant coach: Sara Bayón
- Choreographer: Gregory Milan
Medal record
Rhythmic Gymnastics
Representing France
Event	1st	2nd	3rd
FIG World Cup	0	0	1
Total	0	0	1
European Championships
Silver medal – second place	2025 Tallinn	5 Ribbons

Shana Loxton-Vernaton (born 21 May 2007) is a French rhythmic gymnast, currently a member of the national group.

== Career ==
Shana first caught the eye of the national team coordinators in 2019, when she was invited for a training camp among other pre junior gymnasts.

In 2021, she integrated the national team, when she was again selected for a training camp and an internal routine review with the 2022-2024 code of points.

In February 2022, she won gold among the juniors born in 2007 in the first internal control. In March she was again the winner, among all the juniors this time, and therefore sent to the international tournament in Sofia along Chloé Ineze, where Shana was 15th in the All-Around and second reserve in the hoop and ball finals. In May she won silver at nationals behind Ineze, she was selected for the European Championships in Tel Aviv along the senior group, senior individuals Hélène Karbanov and Lily Ramonatxo and Chloé Ineze and Margot Tran, there Loxton competed with ribbon and was 11th in teams and 23rd with the apparatus. From 2 to 4 June she was also a member of the French team for the Mediterranean Gymnastics Confederation Championships in Mersin, she was 6th in teams and 4th in the ribbon final.

In 2023, she became a senior and was invited to join the national senior group, training under Anna Baranova and Sara Bayòn with the dream of competing at the 2028 Olympic Games. On April 14, she was revealed as a reserve for the European Championships in Baku, on the 28th she participated in a demonstration in Miramas.

At the 2025 European Championships in Tallinn, Shana and the French group placed 9th in the all-around and won silver medail in 5 ribbons final.
