= Kseniya Moustafaeva =

French rhythmic gymnast

Kséniya Moustafaeva
- Born: 8 June 1995 (age 31) Minsk, Belarus
- Height: 163 cm (5 ft 4 in)

Gymnastics career
- Discipline: Rhythmic gymnastics
- Country represented: France; (2010 - 2021)
- Club: Bourges
- Head coach: Svetlana Moustafaeva
- Assistant coach: Irina Nechoroshkova
- Choreographer: David Kowalik, Mickael Avakov
- Retired: yes
- World ranking: 24 WC 41 WCC (2017 Season); 19 (2016 Season); 15 (2015 Season); 11 (2014 Season); 18 (2013 Season); 20 (2012 Season)
Medal record
Rhythmic Gymnastics
Representing France
Mediterranean Games
Bronze medal – third place	2013 Mersin	All-around

Kséniya Moustafaeva (born 8 June 1995 in Minsk, Belarus) is a French individual rhythmic gymnast of Belarusian origin. She is a 5-time French National all-around champion.

== Career ==
Moustafaeva started gymnastics at 4 years of age. She and her mother, Svetlana moved to France in 2000. She has been member of the French national team since 2010. She won the silver in all-around in the 2011, 2012 French Nationals behind Delphine Ledoux. She competed at the 2012 London Olympics Test Event and finished 22nd, she did not qualify for the 2012 Olympics.

In 2013, she competed in the World Cup and Grand Prix Series. She then competed at the 2013 European Championships. She won the bronze medal in all-around at the 2013 Mediterranean Games behind Greek gymnast Varvara Filiou. In the 2013 World Championships, Moustafaeva finished 12th in the All-around final.

In 2014, she began the season competing at the 2014 Moscow Grand Prix finishing 19th in the all-around. She finished 10th in all-around at the 2014 Thiais Grand Prix and won her first Grand Prix medal, a bronze in ball. Moustafaeva then competed at the 2014 Stuttgart World Cup finishing 11th in all-around and 5th in ball final. She followed her next event at the 2014 Pesaro World Cup, where she finished 7th in all-around and qualified to all 4 event finals for the first time in her World Cup competitions. Moustafaeva then competed at the 2014 MTM International Tournament and won the all-around silver medal behind Katsiaryna Halkina. On 9–11 May Moustafaeva competed at the 2014 Corbeil-Essonnes World Cup and finished 10th in all-around, she qualified to 2 event finals and won her first World cup medal, a bronze medal in hoop. On 30 May - 1 June Moustafaeva competed at the 2014 Minsk World Cup and finished 5th in all-around behind Maria Titova, she qualified to 2 event finals (hoop, clubs). On 10–15 June Moustafaeva competed at the 2014 European Championships and finished 8th in all-around. At the 2014 World Cup Final in Kazan, Russia. Moustafaeva finished 6th in all-around with a total of 69.450 points behind Korea's Son Yeon-Jae. She qualified to 3 event finals. On 22–28 September Moustafaeva competed at the 2014 World Championships where she finished 11th in the all-around with a total of 67.890 points. She qualified to 1 event final finishing 8th in clubs.

In 2015, she began the season competing at the 2015 Moscow Grand Prix finishing 8th in the all-around. her next event at the 2015 Thiais Grand Prix she won the all-around silver ahead of Israel's Neta Rivkin, she qualified to all 4 event finals winning bronze (ball, clubs, ribbon) and placed 8th in hoop. Moustafaeva finished 10th in all-around at the 2015 Bucharest World Cup, she qualified to 3 event finals and won bronze in clubs. Moustafaeva competed at the 2015 European Championships and finished 8th in hoop and ribbon finals. Moustafaeva finished 14th in all-around at the 2015 Berlin Grand Prix. On 15–21 June Moustafaeva competed at the inaugural 2015 European Games where she finished 7th in the all-around. Moustafaeva then finished 9th in all-around at the 2015 Summer Universiade, she qualified to 3 event finals finishing 5th in ribbon and 6th in clubs, hoop. In August, Moustafaeva competed at the 2015 Budapest World Cup finishing 12th in all-around. At the 2015 World Cup Final in Kazan, Moustafaeva finished 9th in the all-around with a total of 68.800 points, she qualified to 3 apparatus finals finishing 4th in hoop, ball, clubs. On 9–13 September Moustafaeva competed at the 2015 World Championships in Stuttgart where she qualified to 1 apparatus final finishing 7th in ribbon (17.750). In the All-around finals, Moustafaeva finished in 12th place with a total of 69.715 points, behind Korean Son Yeon-Jae.

In 2016 Season, Moustafaeva started her season competing at the 30th Thiais Grand Prix event in Paris, she finished 7th in the all-around and qualified to 3 apparatus finals. On 1–3 April Moustafaeva competed at the 2016 Pesaro World Cup where she finished 7th in the all-around with a total of 71.700 points; she also qualified to hoop, ball and clubs final. Recovering from injury, Moustafaeva withdrew from the 2016 European Championships nomination list; her quota was then replaced by Finland's Jouki Tikkanen. On 8–10 July Moustafaeva returned to competition from her at the 2016 Kazan World Cup where she finished 12th in the all-around with a total of 70.500 points and qualified to the ball finals. On 22–24 July, culminating the World Cup of the season in 2016 Baku World Cup, Vladinova finished 6th in the all-around with a total of 71.750 points, she qualified to 3 apparatus finals. On 22–24 July, culminating the World Cup of the season in 2016 Baku World Cup, Moustafaeva finished 4th in the all-around with a total of 73.350 points - a New Personal Best, she qualified to all apparatus finals winning bronze in hoop, clubs, 4th in ball and 7th in ribbon.

On 19–20 August Moustafaeva competed at the 2016 Summer Olympics held in Rio de Janeiro, Brazil. She qualified to the rhythmic gymnastics individual all-around final where she finished in 10th place with a total of 68.240 points.

In 2017 Season, Moustafaeva debuted her new routines at the Kiev Grand Prix where she finished 12th in the all-around. Her next competition was at the Thiais Grand Prix where she finished 4th in the all-around, she qualified to 3 event finals winning bronze in hoop, ribbon and finished 5th in clubs. Moustaafeva won her 4th consecutive National title at the 2017 French Championships. On 7–9 April Moustafaeva competed at the 2017 Pesaro World Cup finishing 16th in the all-around. Moustafaeva then competed at the 2017 Baku World Cup finishing 13th in the all-around. On 19–21 May Moustafaeva represented the individual senior for France at the 2017 European Championships, she qualified in the clubs final. On 23–25 June Moustafaeva competed at the 2017 Grand Prix Holon finishing 6th in the all-around. Moustafaeva competed at the quadrennial held 2017 World Games in Wrocław, Poland, from 20 to 30 July, she qualified in 2 apparatus finals finishing 6th in clubs and 8th in ribbon. On 11–13 August Moustafaeva competed at the 2017 Kazan World Challenge Cup finishing 15th in the all-around, she qualified in the clubs final finishing in 7th place. Moustafaeva withdrew from the nominative list of participants at the 2017 World Championships after suffering a torn ligament.

== Personal life ==
Kseniya is coached by her mother Svetlena Moustafaeva who was also a rhythmic gymnast. Kseniya speaks four languages: Russian, French, Spanish and English.

== Routine music information ==
Year	Apparatus	Music title
2021	Hoop	No Rules Of Engagement by The City of Prague Philharmonic Orchestra, Brian Tyler y David Sabee
2021	Ball	Ecoutez-moi by Scylla y Sofiane Pamart
2021	Clubs	Doowit by Pharrell Williams
2021	Ribbon	Runnin by Ludwig Görannson feat A$AP Rocky & Jacob Banks
2019	Hoop	Psycho Girls and Psycho Boys by Solal
2019	Ball	The silence (original mix) by Recovery Mafia
2019	Clubs	She Wants Me Dead by CAZZETTE vs. AronChupa ft. The High Sound
2019	Ribbon	?
2018	Hoop	Psycho Girls and Psycho Boys by Solal
2018	Ball	The silence (original mix) by Recovery Mafia
2018	Clubs	She Wants Me Dead by CAZZETTE vs. AronChupa ft. The High Sound
2018	Ribbon	?
2017	Hoop	"Fire on the Floor" by Beth Hart
2017	Ball	" Lasciatemi Qui" by Mónica Naranjo
2017	Clubs	"Lioness Eye" by Xavier Rudd
2017	Ribbon	"Mutant Brain" by Sam Spiegel, Assassin
2016	Hoop	"Song on the Beach", by Arcade Fire
2016	Ball	"In the Middle Somewhat Elevated" by Thom Willems
2016	Clubs	"Escape From East Berlin", music from The Man from U.N.C.L.E by Daniel Pemberton
2016	Ribbon	"Je Vais T'Aimer", by Michel Sardou
2015	Hoop	"Sling The Decks", by The Crystal Method
2015	Ball	"Ne me quitte pas" by Jacques Brel
2015	Clubs	"Mutation", music by Cirque du Soleil
2015	Ribbon	"Elements (Orchestral Version)", music by Lindsey Stirling
2014	Hoop	"Flute", music by New World Sound, Thomas Newson
2014	Ball	"Code Name Vivaldi", music by The Piano Guys
2014	Clubs	"Mutation", music by Cirque du Soleil
2014	Ribbon	"Carnavalera", music by Havana Delirio
2013	Hoop	"Game On", music from Madagascar 3, music by Hans Zimmer
2013	Ball	"Primavera", music by Corciolli
2013	Clubs	"Land Of A Thousand Dances", music by Jessica Mauboy
2013	Ribbon	"United We Stand, Divided We Fall", music by Two Steps from Hell
2012	Hoop	The 5th by David Garrett
2012	Ball	"The 5th", music by David Garrett
2012	Clubs	Mission Imposible
2012	Ribbon	"The Circle Dance" by Didulya
