= Aïnhoa Dot-Espinosa =

French rhythmic gymnast

Aïnhoa Dot
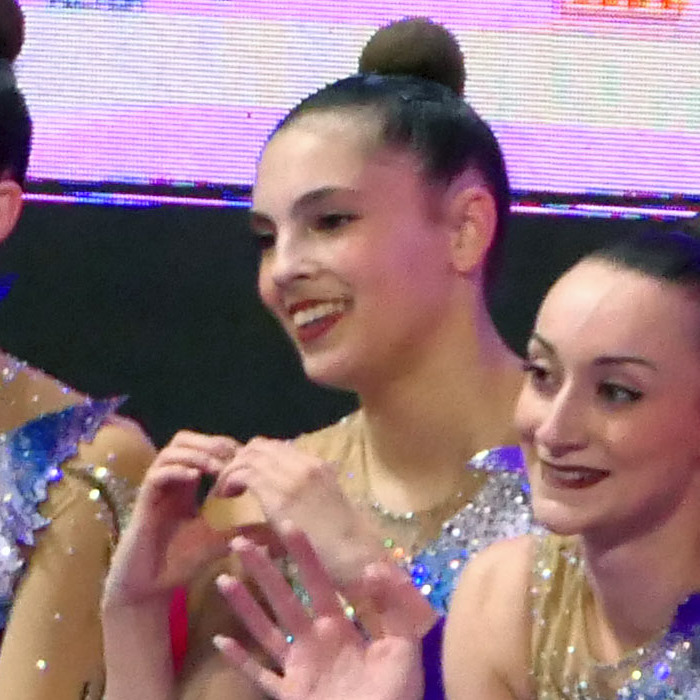
- Dot-Espinosa in 2024

Personal information
- Full name: Aïnhoa Dot-Espinosa
- Born: 15 May 2005 (age 21) Orleans, France

Gymnastics career
- Discipline: Rhythmic gymnastics
- Country represented: France; (2019-)
- Club: Société Municipale d’Orléans Gymnastique
- Head coach: Anna Baranova
- Assistant coach: Sara Bayón
- Former coaches: Jeanne Dot, Isabelle Andre, Snejana Mladenova
- Choreographer: Gregory Milan
Medal record
Rhythmic gymnastics
Representing France
Event	1st	2nd	3rd
FIG World Cup	1	0	2
Total	1	0	2

Aïnhoa Dot-Espinosa (born 15 May 2005) is a French rhythmic gymnast, member of the French national group.

== Personal life ==
Dot took up rhythmic gymnastics at age two in 2007, she now trains for 40 hours per week at the National Institute for Sport, Expertise and Performance [INSEP] in Paris. Her ambition is to be part of the French group that will compete at the Olympic Games 2024. Her sister Thelma is also a rhythmic gymnast. Her favourite apparatuses are ball and clubs. Outside the sporting hall her hobbies are reading, dancing, going to the cinema and listening to music. She plans to become a pediatric surgeon, she speaks French, English and Spanish.

== Career ==
Even though Ainhoa was included into the national senior group in 2019 she made it to the starting five in 2022, debuting at the World Cup in Athens where the group won All-Around gold. One month later, in April, they won bronze in both the All-Around and 5 hoops in Sofia. In June Dot and the group travelled to Pesaro, being 6th in the All-Around and 4th with 5 hoops. Ten days later she competed at the 2022 European Championships in Tel Aviv, where France was 6th in the All-Around, 7th in the 5 hoops final and 5th in the 3 ribbons + 2 balls' one. In September, Ainhoa made her World Championships debut in Sofia along Emma Delaine, Eleonore Caburet, Manelle Inaho, Ashley Julien, Lozea Vilarino and the two individuals Hélène Karbanov and Maelle Millet, taking 11th place in the All-Around.
