= Kaz Hawkins =

Irish singer-songwriter

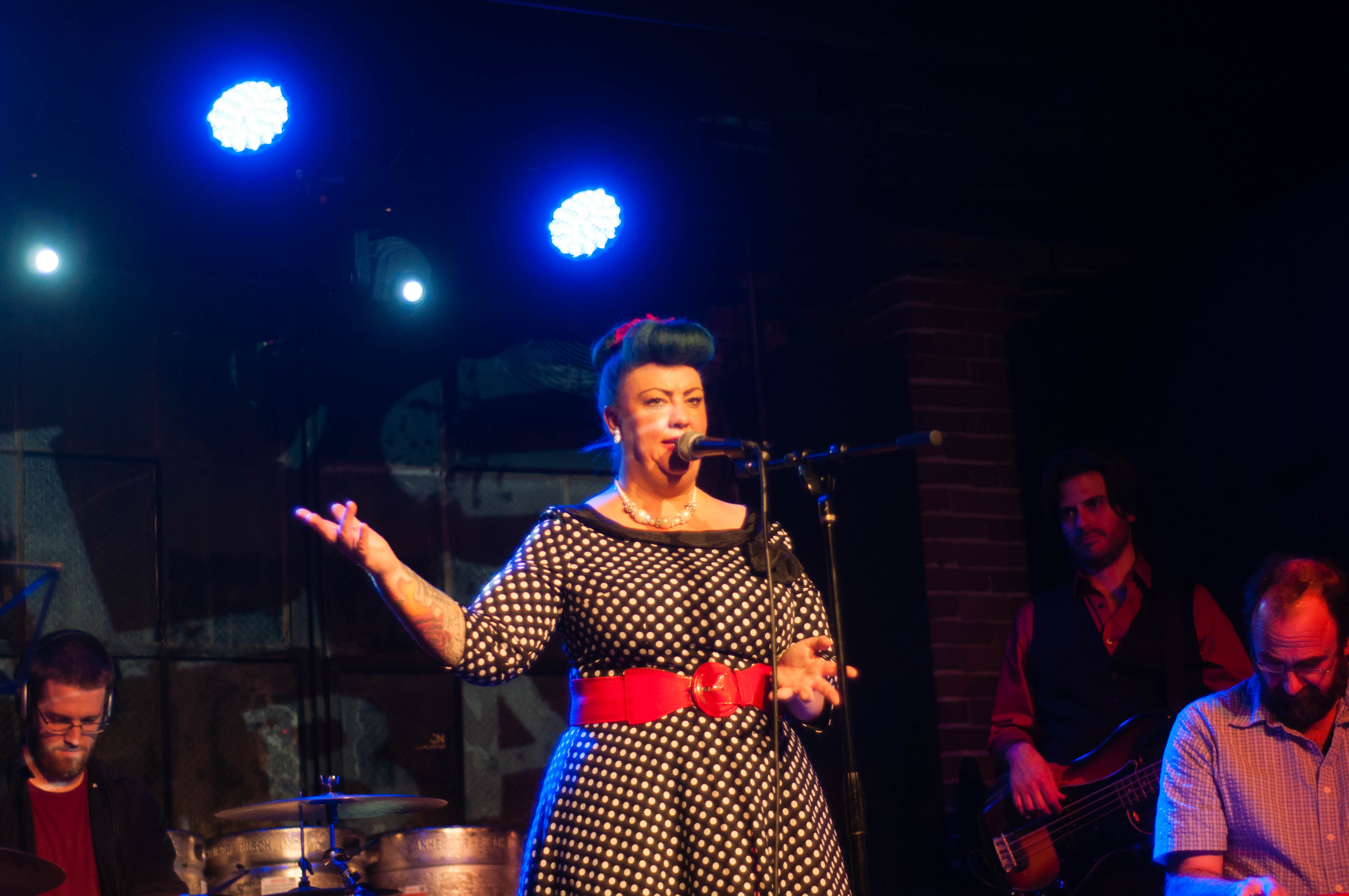
- Hawkins at Bill's Bar & Lounge, Boston, 3 December 2014

Background information
- Born: Belfast, Northern Ireland
- Genres: Jazz, blues, soul, folk, Americana
- Occupation: Singer-songwriter
- Instruments: Vocals, guitar, piano, bodhrán drum
- Label: Dixiefrog Records
- Website: kazhawkins.com

Kaz Hawkins is a Northern Irish blues, folk, jazz and soul singer and songwriter signed to Dixiefrog Records in Paris, France and Earlybird Records in Germany.

== Career ==
Hawkins was born in Belfast, Northern Ireland but now lives in a rural part of France and sang in cover bands for 20 years before she began creating original material.

Hawkins has released 6 studio albums, two EPs (no longer available), and three live albums (one no longer available). She has also released one compilation album exclusively on vinyl. Upon signing with Dixiefrog Records, an anthology of her back catalogue called My Life and I, was released. A seventeen track CD and double vinyl was released in 2022. In 2023 Until We Meet Again (2023) and Live In Brezoi (I) (2024) was also released on the Dixiefrog label.

In 2025 A French documentary called "My Life And You" that was made about Hawkins early traumatic years by France Televisions was released and is now currently streaming online by France.TV. This production was produced by French film company Oxymore in partnership with Festival Éclats d'Émail Jazz in Limoges, France where Hawkins now lives.

Collaborations with other artists have helped her enter other genres. The latest in July 2024 with English DJ Craig Charles featuring Hawkins song "Shake" on his album Trunk Of Funk Volume 3 (2024). In January 2024 a duet called "A Place Like Home" with French soul artist Thomas Kahn . In December 2023 Hawkins featured on a gospel single "Life Is A Road" with Italian duo Superdownhome. In 2019, she featured on French house & funk Dj Eugène de Rastignac's single "Won't You Save My Soul" released on SPACE PARTY Records. In 2020, On This Little Island was released as a duet with German composer Mathis Richter-Reichhelm (Swimming The Nile) on Early-Bird Records in Germany.

Hawkins was invited to Florence Academy of Art in Alabama, to join in a various artists album Something In The Water, to help highlight children not having access to arts in Alabama. The album included one of the original Muscle Shoals Rhythm Section, David Hood and musicians Clayton Ivey and Will McFarlane - supporting a line up of international artists covering songs recorded in Alabama.

In April 2022, Hawkins was given the honorable title of Godmother of the oldest blues festival in France. Cahors Blues Festival asked her permission in front of gathered press at the launch of the 40th anniversary of the festival. She accepted the honour of 'Marraine du festival'. She joined Grammy Award winning Christone "Kingfish" Ingram, Popa Chubby and Kirk Fletcher as festival headliners in July 2022, in the town of Cahors, France.

Hawkins has regularly been invited by the Irish composer and Golden Globe nominee Brian Byrne, to perform in Ireland and Los Angeles on his compositions. She joined an international cast including Fra Fee, Joe Rooney, Adele King, as well as a 70-member choir, and the RTÉ Concert Orchestra for the launch of the production of Angel of Broadway in Dublin.

In 2017, Hawkins reached the semi-finals of The Blues Foundation International Blues Challenge which then led to her winning the European Blues Challenge in Horsens, Denmark representing the United Kingdom. It was the first time the UK had an artist win at the challenge, beating 21 countries. In the same year, Hawkins began presenting a blues show on BBC Radio Ulster, called Kaz Hawkins Got The Blues, produced by Ralph McLean. As of 2026, a total of 10 series have been recorded by Hawkins for BBC Radio.

== Awards ==
- Winner - Best Album for My Life And I - Innocent Award. Berlin, Germany (2022).
- NI Music Prize nominee in 2014, 2015, 2016 and 2022
- Winner - Northern Ireland Blues Act of the Year - UK Blues Award (2018).
- Winner - European Blues Challenge in Denmark (2017).
- Semi-finalist - Blues Foundation International Blues Challenge, Memphis (2017).
- Winner - UK Blues Challenge (2016).
- Winner - Pure M Magazine Awards - Ireland Best Female and Best Video for "This Is Me" (2016).
- Winner - Barry Middleton Memorial Award for Emerging Artist at the British Blues Awards (2015).

== Discography ==
=== Studio albums ===
- Get Ready (2014)
- Feelin' Good (2017) - Kaz Hawkins Band
- Feelin' Good (2017) (US Version)
- Feelin' Good (2018) (reissue)
- Don't You Know (2017)
- Until We Meet Again (2023)

=== Live albums ===
- Live at The Park Avenue Feat. Sam York (2018)
- Live at La Traverse (no longer available) (2020)
- Live in Brezoi (I) (2024)

=== Compilation albums ===
- The Collection on Vinyl (2018)
- Memories Of (2020)
- My Life And I (2022 Remastered) Dixiefrog Records
- My Life And I (Special Edition Vinyl Picture Disc (2025) Dixiefrog Records

=== Singles ===
- "On This Little Island" (2020) - Mathis & Kaz (Earlybird Records, Germany)
- "Slow Down" (2024)
- "Sail On (Orchestral Version)" (2024)
- "Sail On (Acoustic Version)" (2024)
- "My Mountain" (2025)

=== Appears on ===
- "Shake" (2014) Track 4 on Various – The Best Of 2014 (The blues magazine of Classic Rock later renamed Louder Sound)
- "Let it Be" (2015) Track 6 on Simon Murphy - Let it Be
- "Won't You Save My Soul" (2019) Single - Eugene De Rastignac
- "Something in the Water" (2019) Various Artists - Florence Academy of Fine Arts (FAFA), United States
- "Life Is A Road" (2023) Single - Superdownhome
- "A Place Like Home" (2024) Single - Thomas Kahn
- "Shake" (2024 Remaster) Track 13 on Craig Charles – Trunk Of Funk Volume 3
