= Union of Gymnastics Societies of France =

The Union of Gymnastics Societies of France (French: Fédération française de gymnastique) was the governing body of gymnastics in France from 1873 to 1942. It was succeeded by the French Gymnastics Federation.

It was founded on September 28, 1873, by Eugène Paz.
