= French Gymnastics Federation =

National governing body of gymnastics in France

- Sport: Gymnastics
- Jurisdiction: France
- Abbreviation: FFG
- Founded: 1942
- Affiliation: FIG
- Headquarters: Rue des Petites-Écuries, Paris
- President: Dominique Mérieux

Official website
- www.ffgym.fr
- (France)

The French Gymnastics Federation (French: Fédération française de gymnastique) is the governing body of gymnastics in France since 1942. It was preceded by the Union of Gymnastics Societies of France.

== See also ==
- Charles Cazalet
