= Delphine Ledoux =

French rhythmic gymnast (born 1985)

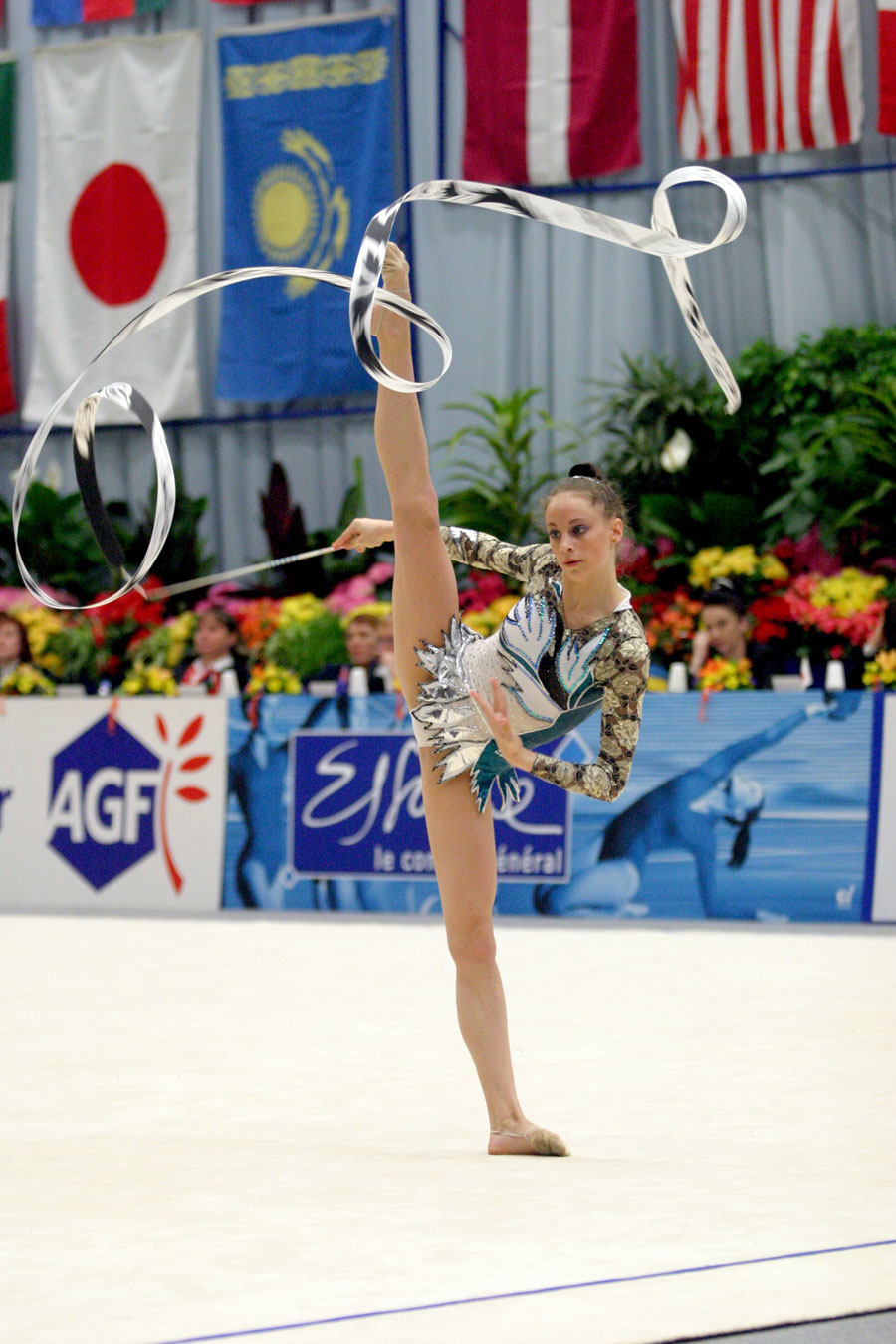
- Ledoux in 2003

Personal information
- Nickname: Delph
- Born: 15 May 1985 (age 41) Calais, France
- Height: 169 cm (5 ft 7 in)

Gymnastics career
- Discipline: Rhythmic gymnastics
- Country represented: France
- Club: Calais GRS
- Head coach: Katia Guillere
- Retired: 2012
Medal record
Women's rhythmic gymnastics
Representing France
Mediterranean Games
Silver medal – second place	2005 Almería	All-around
Silver medal – second place	2009 Pescara	All-around

Delphine Ledoux (born 15 May 1985 in Calais) is a French rhythmic gymnast. She is a nine-time French national all-around champion and represented France at the 2012 Summer Olympics.

== Personal life ==
Ledoux was born 15 May 1985 in Calais. She speaks English and Spanish in addition to French. She looked up to fellow rhythmic gymnast Olena Vitrychenko.

In 2013, a gymnasium in Calais was named in her honor. She was an Olympic torch bearer for the 2024 Summer Olympics.

== Career ==
Ledoux began gymnastics at seven years old. She was the French national champion for a national record of nine consecutive years (2004-2012). During her career, she trained more than 40 hours a week.

She began competing internationally in 1999. Ledoux missed competing at the 2003 World Championships due to an injury. However, she competed at the 2005 World Championships, where she qualified for the all-around final and finished 24th. At the next World Championships in 2007, she placed 35th in the qualification round and did not advance to the final.

She won the all-around silver medal at the 2009 Mediterranean Games. At the 2009 World Championships, she placed 19th in the all-around final.

Ledoux began studying for a degree in communications. However, in 2010, she put her studies on hold to make time for her third attempt at qualifying for the Olympics after having missed the 2004 and 2008 Games, despite already being considered unusually old for a rhythmic gymnast at 25. That year, she competed at the 2010 World Championships. She reached a World apparatus final for the first time, in rope, and finished 13th in the all-around.

At the 2011 World Championships, Ledoux was awarded the Longines Prize for Elegance. She finished 12th in the all-around, which qualified a quota for France at the 2012 Summer Olympics.

She competed in the individual all-around event at the 2012 Summer Olympics, where she placed 13th in the qualification round.

Ledoux retired after the Olympics to study physiotherapy. After three years of training, she graduated and joined a practice near Calais, where she also coaches child gymnasts part-time.
