= Maelle Millet =

French rhythmic gymnast (born 2004)

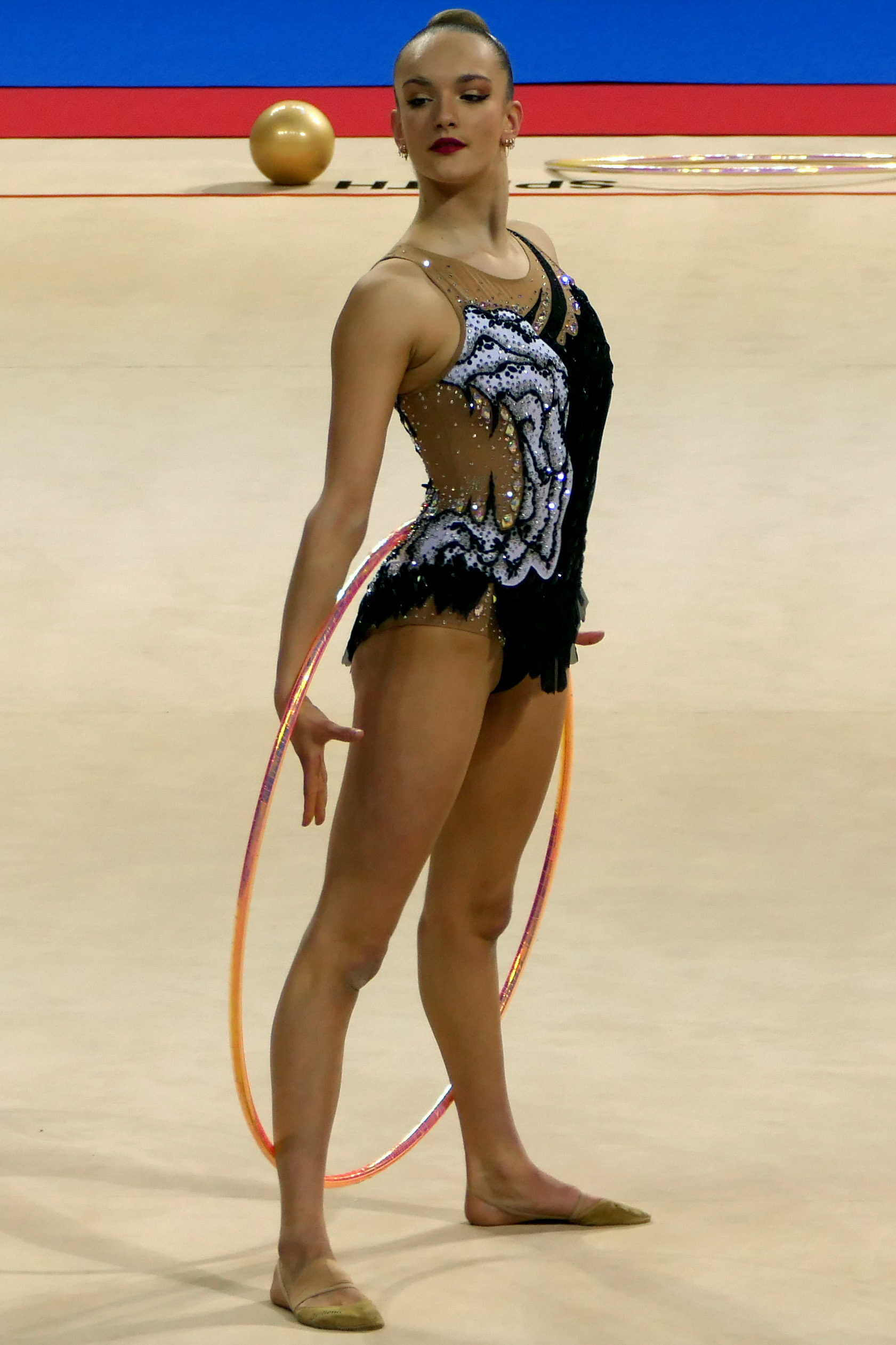
- Millet in 2024
- Born: 22 August 2004 (age 22) Saint Gaudens, France

Gymnastics career
- Discipline: Rhythmic gymnastics
- Country represented: France; (2019-2024)
- Club: Association Thionville Gymnastique Rythmique et Sportive
- Head coach: Alexandra Konova
- Assistant coach: Emilie Bohn
- Former coaches: Stéphanie and Magalie Fontan
- Choreographer: Fabrice Mineau
- Retired: yes
Medal record
Rhythmic gymnastics
Representing France
Event	1st	2nd	3rd
FIG World Cup	0	0	1
Total	0	0	1
National Championships
Gold medal – first place	2021 Calais	All-Around
Gold medal – first place	2022 Calais	All-Around
Gold medal – first place	2023 Mulhouse	All-Around

Maelle Millet (French: [maɛl mijɛ]; born 22 August 2004) is a retired French rhythmic gymnast. She is a three-time French national champion (2021-2023).

== Personal life ==
Millet took up rhythmic gymnastics at age six after a demonstration near her home. She moved to train at the national youth training hub (Pole Espoir) in Montpellier, France at age 11, and she trained for 26 hours per week. Her favourite apparatuses are ball and ribbon, and her ultimate ambition was to compete at the 2024 Olympic Games in Paris.

== Career ==
=== Junior ===
At the first Junior World Championships in Rhythmic Gymnastics in Moscow in 2019, she placed 14th with ball, the only apparatus she competed with.

=== Senior ===
She debuted in as a senior in 2021 at the World Cup Sofia, where she ended 19th in the all-around and didn't qualify for finals. She was selected to represent France at the 2021 European Championship in Varna, Bulgaria, along with Kseniya Moustafaeva. At the Championships, she competed with four apparatuses and did not qualify for the all-around final. Millet also competed at the World Championships, placing 19th in the all around.

In 2022 she took part at the World Cups in Sofia and Baku. She qualified for the hoop and ball finals in Sofia and won her first world cup medal, a bronze with hoop. Despite winning the French nationals she was only named reserve gymnast for the 2022 European Championship.

In 2024, she won the silver medal in the all-around behind Hélène Karbanov at the French National Championships. She retired in July.

== Routine music information ==
Year	Apparatus	Music Title
2024	Hoop	Casting by Christophe Maé
2024	Ball	Vole by Celine Dion
2024	Clubs	Alors on danse (Dubdogz Remix) by Stromae
2024	Ribbon	Non, je ne regrette rien by Édith Piaf
2023	Hoop	Obijmy by Okean Elzy
2023	Ball	Vole by Celine Dion
2023	Clubs	Alors on danse (Dubdogz Remix) by Stromae
2023	Ribbon	Bella by Gims
2022	Hoop	Obijmy by Okean Elzy
2022	Ball	Caruso by Lara Fabian
2022	Clubs	Alors on danse (Dubdogz Remix) by Stromae
2022	Ribbon	L'enfer by Stromae
2021	Hoop	Who Am I? by The Mystery of Bulgarian Voices
2021	Ball	Una Mattina by Ludovico Einaudi
2021	Clubs	Can't Hold Us by Macklemore & Ryan Lewis feat Ray Dalton
2021	Ribbon	Dark Angel (Original Mix) by 8 O'clock
2019	Rope	Knock On Wood by Safari Duo
2019	Ball	Comme toi by Amel Bent
2019	Clubs	I Wanna Dance by Artem Uznov
2019	Ribbon	Lon Lon (Ravel's Bolero) by Angelique Kidjo
