= Hélène Karbanov =

French rhythmic gymnast (born 2004)

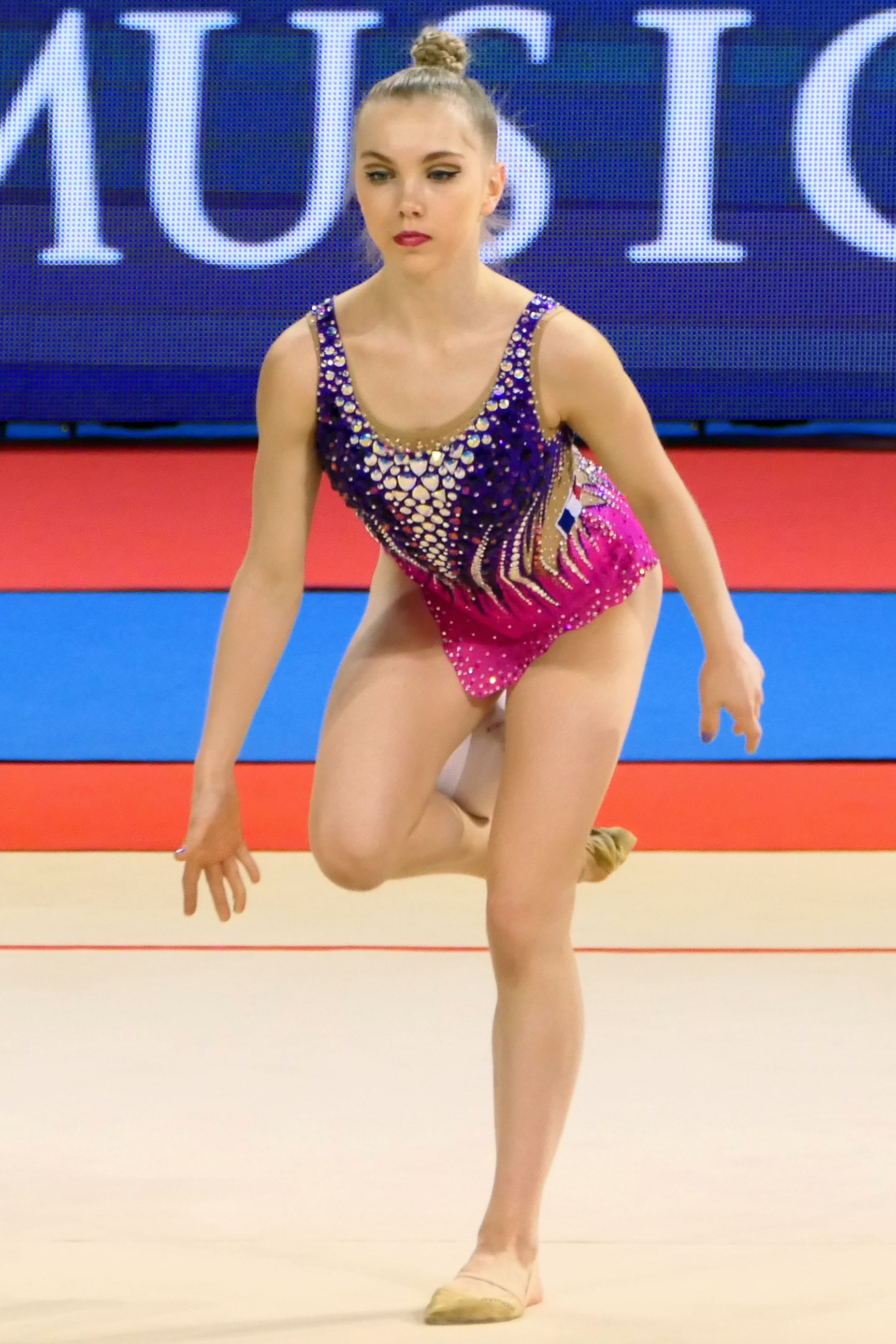
- Karbanov in 2024
- Born: 29 December 2004 (age 21) Lille, France
- Height: 158 cm (5 ft 2 in)

Gymnastics career
- Discipline: Rhythmic gymnastics
- Country represented: France; (2018)
- Club: Calais GRS
- Head coach: Katia Guillere
- Choreographer: Sacha Vangrevelynghe
- World ranking: 19 WC
Medal record
Representing France
Rhythmic Gymnastics
Event	1st	2nd	3rd
FIG World Challenge Cup	0	1	0
Grand Prix	1	1	3
Total	1	2	3
Gymnasiades
Gold medal – first place	2022 Normandy	All-around
Gold medal – first place	2022 Normandy	Ball
Gold medal – first place	2022 Normandy	Clubs
Bronze medal – third place	2022 Normandy	Hoop

Hélène Karbanov (born 29 December 2004) is a French individual rhythmic gymnast of Kazakh and Russian descent. She competed at the 2024 Paris Olympics in the rhythmic individual all-around and finished in 17th place in qualification.

On national level, she is the 2024 French all-around champion and the 2022 bronze medalist.

== Career ==
Karbanov took up rhythmic gymnastics at age eight. She first competed in the sport in 2013 with her club Calais GRS.

=== Junior ===
In her first junior season, she won the silver medal in the French National all-around behind Valérie Romenski, even though she still had Russian citizenship at that point. In January 2018, she obtained French citizenship. Being able to compete internationally for France, she was selected to represent her country at the 2018 European Championships in Guadalajara. She finished 8th in the team competition, 29th with ball and 30th with clubs.

In 2019 she became the French junior all-around champion, and she also won silver with ball and bronze with ribbon. She was selected to compete at the 2019 Junior World Rhythmic Gymnastics Championships in Moscow, Russia. She participated with clubs and ribbon, where she finished in 9th and 11th place respectively. Polina Murashko from Estonia had the same clubs score as her, but the Estonian gymnast was able to enter the final with her better execution score as the tiebreaker.

=== Senior ===
In 2022, she was part of French team that competed at the 2022 European Championships in Tel Aviv, Israel and took 7th place in the team competition. She placed 13th in the all-around Final and qualified for the ribbon final, where she finished 7th. That year, she also debuted at the senior World Championships. The competition was held in Sofia, Bulgaria, and she placed 22nd in the all-around qualifications.

In 2023, she competed at Portimao World Challenge Cup, where she took 8th place in the all-around and won a silver medal in the ribbon final. At the 2023 World Championships, she ended in 13th place in the all-around qualifications and qualified to the all-around final, where she took 17th place.

In 2024, she entered the World Cup stage in Sofia, where she placed 16th. In May, she competed at the 2024 European Championships in Budapest, Hungary and took 15th place in the all-around final. In June, she won her first senior National all-around title in front of Maelle Millet.

In August, she competed at the 2024 Summer Olympics. In the qualification round, she placed 17th and did not advance to the final. She said of competing at the Olympics in her home country, "It's unreal. I tried to make the most of it all."

In February 2025, she competed at 1st stage of Italian club champinoships Serie A, contributing to the result of club Polisportiva Varese. After that, she was absent for the entire season due to injury recovery. In November, she presented all of her new routines at national competition.

In 2026, she won the silver medal in the all-around at Gymnastik International in Fellbach Schmiden, Germany. On May 16-17, she competed at the FIG World Challenge Cup in Portimão, and took 21st place in all-around.

== Routine music information ==
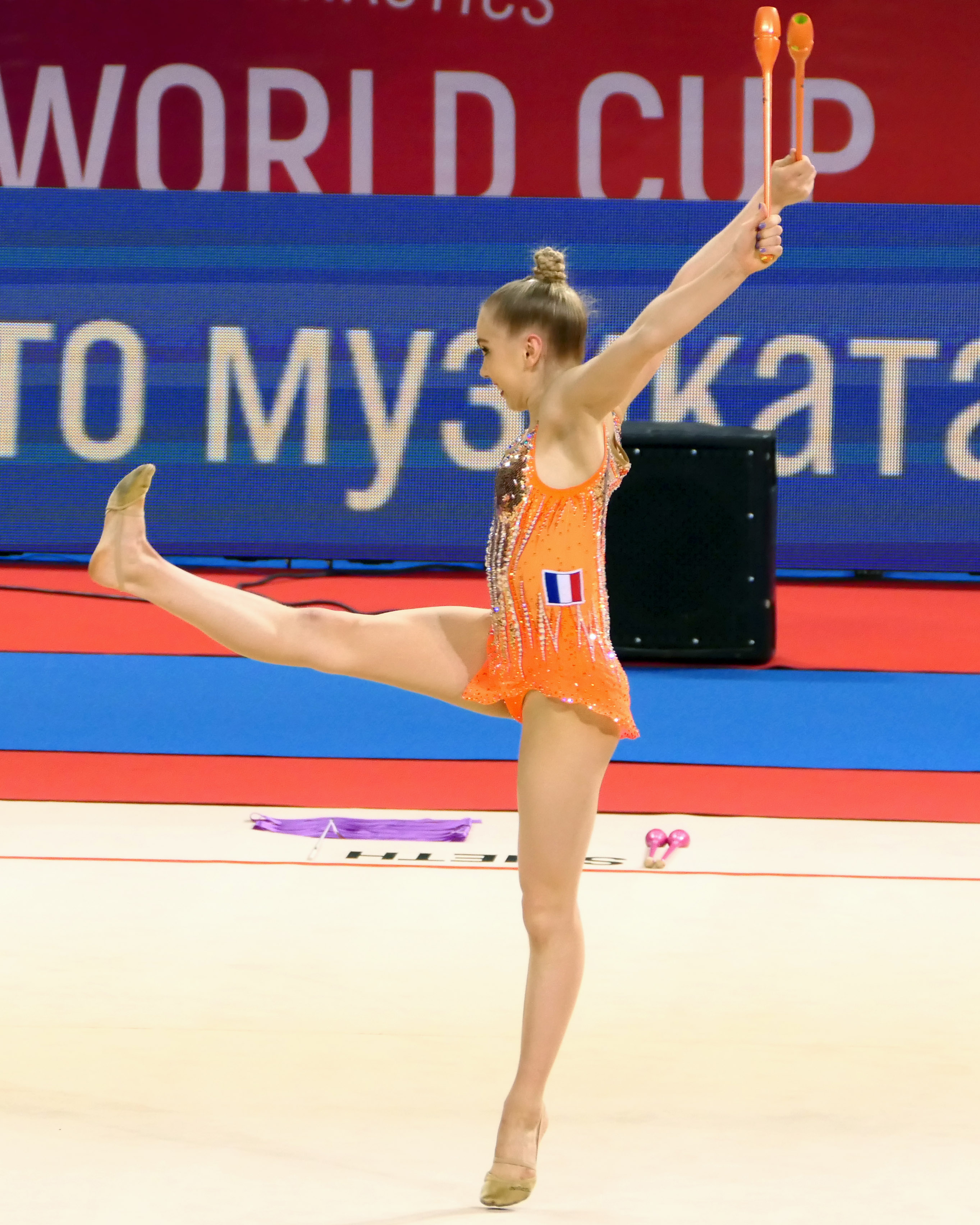
Karbanov competing with clubs at the 2024 Sofia World Cup

Year	Apparatus	Music title
2026	Hoop	Exister by Barbara Pravi
2026	Ball	Schindler's List
2026	Clubs	Bienvenida by Selena Gomez
2026	Ribbon	Rock of Lazarus (In a Box III Version) by Asaf Avidan
2025	Hoop	
2025	Ball	Schindler's List
2025	Clubs	
2025	Ribbon	Surviving by Kaz Hawkins, Sam York
2024	Hoop	"Carmina Burana" by Ed Starink
2024	Ball	"Le temps qui reste" by Serge Reggiani
2024	Clubs	"I Got You (I Feel Good)" by James Brown
2024	Ribbon	"Surviving" by Kaz Hawkins, Sam York
2023	Hoop	"Carmina Burana" by Ed Starink
2023	Ball	"Le temps qui reste" by Serge Reggiani
2023	Clubs	"Middle Of The Night" by Power-Haus, Tom Evans, Joel Sunny
2023	Ribbon	"Corps" by Yseult
2022	Hoop	"Torna a casa" by Måneskin
2022	Ball	"Le temps qui reste" by Serge Reggiani
2022	Clubs	"It's Raining Men" by Geri Halliwell
2022	Ribbon	"Corps" by Yseult
2020/2021	Hoop	"Je suis malade" by Lara Fabian
2020/2021	Ball	"Feelings" by Edvin Marton
2020/2021	Clubs	"Imagine" by Artem Uzanov
2020/2021	Ribbon	"Black Betty" by Ram Jam
