= Georges (name) =

- Pronunciation: French: [ʒɔʁʒ]
- Gender: Male
- Language: French

Origin
- Meaning: "Farmer"

Other names
- See also: George, Jürgen, Yuri, Georgy, Georg, Giorgio, Jorge

Georges is a French name with the same origin as the English name George. Notable people with the name include:

== Given name ==
=== A ===
- Georges Ibrahim Abdallah (born 1951), Lebanese communist militant serving a life sentence for complicity in murder
- Georges Abi-Saab, Egyptian lawyer, professor of international law, and an international judge
- Georges Abrial, French aerodynamicist
- Georges Adéagbo, Beninese sculptor
- Georges Adwan, Lebanese politician
- Georges Agabekov, Soviet spy and detector
- Georges Akieremy, Gabonese football striker
- Georges Altman, French journalist and resistance fighter
- Georges Anderla, Czech-born French economist
- Georges André, French bobsledder
- Georges Andrique, French painter
- Georges Anglade, Haitian–Canadian geographer, professor, writer and politician
- Georges Annenkov, Russian artist and writer
- Georges Aperghis, Greek composer of contemporary music theater
- Georges-Jean Arnaud, French author
- Georges Arvanitas, French jazz pianist and organist
- Georges Auguste, French chef and culinary writer
- Georges Auric, French composer
- Georges Azenstarck, French photographer

=== B ===
- Georges Ba, Ivorian-French footballer
- Georges Badin, French poet and painter
- Georges Balandier, French anthropologist and ethnologist
- Georges Ball, Canadian politician and lumber merchant
- Georges Bardet, French physician
- Georges-Isidore Barthe, Quebec lawyer, publisher, journalist and political figure
- Georges Bataille, French intellectual and philosopher
- Georges Beauchemin, Canadian singer and veterinarian
- Georges Beaucourt, French footballer
- Georges Bédard, Canadian politician
- Georges Bégué, French engineer
- Georges Bénédite, French Egyptologist
- Georges Bénézé, French philosopher
- Georges Bereta, French football player
- Georges Berger, Belgian racing driver
- Georges Bernanos, French author and a soldier in World War I
- Georges Bernier, French humorist
- Georges Bess, comic book creator
- Georges Besse, French businessman
- Georges Biassou, early leader of the 1791 slave rising in Saint-Domingue that began the Haitian Revolution
- Georges Bidault, French politician
- Georges Biscot, French actor
- Georges Bizet, French composer
- Georges-Henri Blouin, Canadian diplomat
- Georges Boillot, French racing driver and World War I in fighter pilot
- Georges Bonnet, French politician
- Georges Boucher, Canadian ice hockey defenseman
- Georges Boudarel, French academic and militant communist
- Georges Boulanger (violinist), Romanian violinist, conductor and composer
- Georges Bouriano, Romanian racing driver
- Georges Braque, French painter, collagist, draughtsman, printmaker and sculptor
- Georges Brassens, French singer-songwriter and poet
- Georges Bregy, Swiss football player
- Georges Briard, American designer
- Georges Brossard, Canadian entomologist
- Georges Brunschvig, Swiss lawyer and president of the Swiss Federation of Jewish Communities

=== C ===
- Georges Cadoudal, marshal of France
- Georges Canguilhem, French philosopher and physician
- Georges Capdeville, French football referee
- Georges Carnus, French football player
- Georges Carpentier, French boxer, actor and World War I pilot
- Georges Casolari, French footballer
- Georges Catroux, French Army general and diplomat
- Georges Antoine Chabot, French jurist and statesman
- Georges Chaperot, French screenwriter
- Georges Chappe, French road bicycle racer
- Georges Charpak, French physicist
- Georges Charpy, French scientist
- Georges Chastellain, Burgundian historian and poet
- Georges-André Chevallaz, Swiss historian, politician and member of the Swiss Federal Council
- Georges Chometon, French politician
- Georges Christen, Luxembourgish strongman
- Georges Claude, French engineer and inventor
- Georges Clemenceau, French politician and statesman
- Georges Clément, French athlete
- Georges Cochery, French politician
- Georges Condominas, French anthropologist
- Georges Corm, Lebanese politician, economist and historian
- Georges Corraface, Greek-French actor
- Georges Corriveau, Canadian politician
- Georges Corvington, Haitian historian
- Georges Coste, French rugby Union footballer and coach
- Georges Cottier, Swiss prelate and theologian of the Catholic Church
- Georges Coudray, French politician
- Georges Courteline, French dramatist and novelist
- Georges Couthon, French politician and lawyer
- Georges Croegaert, Belgian painter
- Georges Crozier, French international footballer
- Georges Cziffra, Hungarian-French virtuoso pianist and composer

=== D ===
- Georges d'Amboise, French Roman Catholic cardinal and minister of state
- Georges Dandelot, French composer and teacher
- Georges Danton, French lawyer and a leading figure in the French Revolution
- Georges Darboy, Catholic archbishop
- Georges Dard, French footballer
- Georges Darien, French author
- Georges d'Armagnac, French humanist, patron of arts, Cardinal and diplomat
- Georges de Beauregard, French film producer
- Georges de Brébeuf, French poet and translator
- Georges de Feure, French painter, theatrical designer, and industrial art designer
- Georges-Charles de Heeckeren d'Anthès, French soldier and politician
- Georges de la Falaise, French fencer
- Georges de la Nézière, French athlete
- Georges de La Tour, French Baroque painter
- Georges de la Trémoille, French diplomat
- Georges de Layens, French botanist and apiculturalist
- Georges-Daniel de Monfreid, French painter and art collector
- Georges De Moor, academic leader and physician
- Georges de Paris, French tailor
- Georges de Porto-Riche, French dramatist and novelist
- Georges de Rham, Swiss mathematician
- Georges de Scudéry, French novelist, dramatist and poet
- Georges de Selve, French scholar, diplomat and ecclesiastic
- Georges Decaux, French road bicycle racer
- Georges Delahaie, French artist
- Georges Delerue, French composer
- Georges Delfanne, Belgian collaborator and spy
- Georges-Isidore Delisle, Canadian politician
- Georges Demenÿ, French inventor, chronophotographer, filmmaker, gymnast and physical fitness enthusiast
- Georges Depping, German-French historian and writer
- Georges A. Deschamps, French American engineer
- Georges-Casimir Dessaulles, Canadian businessman, statesman and senator
- Georges Detreille, French racing cyclist
- Georges Dib Nehme, Lebanese businessman and politician
- Georges Diebolt, French sculptor
- Georges Dimou, Greek actor and singer
- Georges Dionne, Canadian politician
- Georges Dor, Canadian author, composer, playwright, singer, poet, translator, and theatrical producer and director
- Georges Doriot, French American general
- Georges Dottin, French philologist
- Georges Dransart, French sprint canoeist
- Georges Dreyer, Danish pathologist
- Georges Duboeuf, French wine merchant
- Georges Duby, French historian
- Georges Dufrénoy, French painter
- Georges Duhamel, French author
- Georges Dumas, French medical doctor and psychologist
- Georges Dumézil, French philologist, linguist, and religious studies scholar
- Georges Dumont, Canadian physician and politician
- Georges-Hilaire Dupont, Catholic bishop
- Georges-Hippolyte le Comte Dupré, Canadian politician
- Georges-Mathieu de Durand, Canadian academic
- Georges Duval de Leyrit, French colonial administrator

=== E ===
- Georges Eekhoud, Belgian writer
- Georges El Ghorayeb, Lebanese scouting leader
- Georges Elhedery, Lebanese banker
- Georges Eo, French football player and manager
- Georges Erasmus, Canadian politician

=== F ===
- Georges Farrah, Canadian politician
- Georges Fenech, French politician and magistrate
- Georges Feydeau, French playwright
- Georges Figon, French chemist and secret agent
- Georges Fleurix, Belgian water polo player
- Georges Florovsky, Russian Orthodox priest, theologian, and historian
- Georges Fouré, French-German philatelist and stamp forger
- Georges Fournier, French astronomer
- Georges Franju, French filmmaker
- Georges Frêche, French politician and legal historian
- Georges Friedel, French mineralogist and crystallographer
- Georges Friedmann, French sociologist and philosopher

=== G ===
- Georges Galinat, French boxer
- Georges Gandil, French sprint canoeist
- Georges Garnier, French footballer
- Georges Garvarentz, Armenian-French composer
- Georges Gauthier, Canadian Roman Catholic archbishop
- Georges Gautschi, Swiss figure skater
- Georges Géret, French actor
- Georges Gilles de la Tourette, French physician
- Georges Gilson, French Catholic bishop
- Georges Gimel, French painter
- Georges Girard, French biologist
- Georges Gorse, French politician and diplomat
- Georges Gourdy, French boxer
- Georges Goven, French tennis player
- Georges Goyau, French historian and essayist
- Georges-François-Xavier-Marie Grente, French Catholic cardinal
- Georges Grignard, French race car driver
- Georges Groussard, French road cyclist
- Georges Grün, Belgian association football player
- Georges Guenette (died 1944), Canadian Army deserter
- Georges Guibourg, French singer, author, writer, playwright, and actor
- Georges Guillain, French neurologist
- Georges Gurvitch, French sociologist and jurist
- Georges Guynemer, French flying ace

=== H ===
- Georges Hamacek, French resistance member
- Georges Hartmann, French music publisher, dramatist and opera librettist
- Georges Haupt, Romanian historian
- Georges-Eugène Haussmann, French official and politician
- Georges Hayem, French physician
- Georges Hebbelinck, Belgian writer
- Georges Hebdin, Belgian footballer
- Georges Hébert, French physical educator
- Georges Hector, Haitian painter
- Georges Hellebuyck, Belgian sailor
- Georges Heylens, Belgian footballer
- Georges Hilbert, French sculptor
- Georges Holvoet, Belgian politician
- Georges Hüe, French composer

=== I ===
- Georges Ifrah, French author and a self-taught historian of mathematics
- Georges Imbert, French chemical engineer and inventor
- Georges Izambard, French academic

=== J ===
- Georges Jacob, French master menuisier
- Georges Jacobs, Belgian economist
- Georges Janssen, Belgian lawyer, civil servant and governor of the National Bank of Belgium
- Georges Jean, French poet and essayist
- Georges Jobé, Belgian motocross racer
- Georges Jules Piquet, French colonial governor

=== K ===
- Georges J. F. Köhler, German immunologist
- Georges Kopp, Belgian educated engineer and inventor of Russian descent

=== L ===
- Georges-C. Lachance, Canadian politician
- Georges Lacombe (film director), French film director
- Georges Lacombe (painter), French painter and sculptor
- Georges Ladoux, French spy
- Georges Washington de La Fayette, French army officer
- Georges Lafontaine, Canadian politician
- Georges Lagouge, French gymnast
- Georges Lagrange, French Esperanto writer
- Georges Lakhovsky, Russian-French engineer, author, and inventor
- Georges Lamia, French football goalkeeper
- Georges-Émile Lapalme, Canadian politician
- Georges Laraque, Canadian ice hockey player
- Georges Lautner, French film director and screenwriter
- Georges Lech, French association football player
- Georges Leclanché, French electrical engineer
- Georges-Louis Leclerc, Comte de Buffon, French naturalist, mathematician, and cosmologist
- Georges Lecointe (disambiguation)
- Georges Leekens, Belgian footballer
- Georges Lefebvre, French historian
- Georges Legrain, French Egyptologist
- Georges Lemaire, Belgian road bicycle racer
- Georges Lemaître, Belgian scientist and priest
- Georges Lentz, Australian composer
- Georges Léonnec, French artist
- Georges Leredu, French politician
- Georges-Henri Lévesque, Canadian priest and sociologist
- Georges Lévis, French comic artist
- Georges Leygues, French politician, Prime Minister 1920–1921
- Georges Limbour, French poet and writer
- Georges Loustaunau-Lacau, French politician and Army officer

=== M ===
- Georges Madon, French flying ace
- Georges Mager, French musician
- Georges Malfait, French sprinter
- Georges Malkine, French painter
- Georges Mandel, French Jewish journalist, politician, and Resistance leader
- Georges Mandjeck, Cameroonian football player
- Georges Mantha, Canadian ice hockey player
- Georges Marchais, general secretary of the French Communist Party
- Georges Marchal, French actor
- Georges Mareschal, French surgeon
- Georges Marrane, French politician
- Georges Martin (engineer), French engineer and designer
- Georges Martin (freemason), French physician and politician
- Georges Matheron, French mathematician and geologist
- Georges Mathieu, French painter
- Georges Meekers, Belgian wine critic
- Georges Melchior, French actor
- Georges Méliès, French illusionist, actor, and film director
- Georges Menahem, French economist and sociologist
- Georges Meunier, French road bicycle racer
- Georges Miez, Swiss gymnast
- Georges Migot, French composer
- Georges Miquelle, French American cellist
- Georges Montefiore-Levi, Belgian politician, industrialist and inventor of Jewish extraction
- Georges Mora, German-born Australian entrepreneur, art dealer, patron, connoisseur and restaurateur
- Georges Moustaki, Egyptian-French singer-songwriter
- Georges Mouton, French soldier and political figure
- Georges Mouyémé, Cameroonian football player

=== N ===
- Georges Nagelmackers, Belgian civil engineer and businessman
- Georges Neveux, French writer
- Georges Nomarski, Polish physicist and optics theoretician
- Georges Niang, American basketball player

=== O ===
- Georges Ohnet, French writer
- Georges Oltramare, Swiss writer, journalist and politician

=== P ===
- Georges Painvin, French cryptographer
- Georges Palante, French philosopher and sociologist
- Georges Panayotis, Greek businessman and consultant
- Georges Parent, Canadian lawyer, politician and Speaker of the Senate of Canada
- Georges Pasquier, French racing cyclist
- Georges Passerieu, French cyclist
- Georges Patient, French politician
- Georges Paulais, French actor
- Georges Paulin, French dentist, automobile designer and coachwork stylist
- Georges Paulmier, French road bicycle racer
- Georges Péclet, French actor, director and screenwriter
- Georges Perec, French novelist, filmmaker, documentalist, and essayist
- Georges Périnal, French cinematographer
- Georges Perrier (born 1943), French chef
- Georges Perrier (geodesist) (1872–1946), French geodesist and general
- Georges Perros, French writer
- Georges Petit, French art dealer
- Georges Peyroche, French footballer
- Georges Pharand, Canadian politician and businessman
- Georges Philippe (disambiguation), several people
- Georges Pichard, French comic book artist
- Georges Picot, French diplomat and lawyer
- Georges Picquart, French general
- Georges Pintens, Belgian road bicycle racer
- Georges Piot, French rower
- Georges-René Pléville Le Pelley, French admiral
- Georges Politzer, French philosopher and Marxist theoretician of Hungarian Jewish origin
- Georges Polti, French writer
- Georges Pompidou, French politician
- Georges Pouchet, French naturalist and anatomist
- Georges Poulet, Belgian literary critic
- Georges Poulin, Canadian ice hockey player
- Georges Prêtre, French orchestral and opera conductor
- Georges Prud'Homme, Canadian boxer

=== Q ===
- Georges Querelle, Belgian protagonist and antihero

=== R ===
- Georges Raeders, Brazilian writer
- Georges Rawiri, Gabonese politician, diplomat and poet
- Georges Rayet, French astronomer
- Georges Reeb, French mathematician
- Georges Remi, Belgian comics writer
- Georges Renaud, French chess master, theoretician and organizer
- Georges Renavent, French-American actor
- Georges Rey, American philosopher
- Georges Ribemont-Dessaignes, French writer, artist and art historian
- Georges Ricard-Cordingley, French painter
- Georges Richard, French racing driver and automobile industry pioneer
- Georges Rigal, French swimmer and water polo player
- Georges Robin, French sculptor and designer
- Georges Reich, American actor and dancer
- Georges Rochegrosse, French painter
- Georges Rodenbach, Belgian Symbolist poet and novelist
- Georges Roesch, Swiss-born British automotive pioneer
- Georges Ronsse, Belgian racing cyclist
- Georges Rossignon, French boxer
- Georges Rouault, French painter, draughtsman, and print artist
- Georges Rousse, French photographer, painter, and installation artist
- Georges Roux (illustrator), French painter
- Georges Ruggiu, Belgian radio presenter

=== S ===
- Georges Saadeh, Lebanese politician
- Georges Sadoul, French film critic, journalist and cinema writer
- Georges Sagnac, French physicist
- Georges Saillard, French film actor
- Georges Sainte-Rose, French triple jumper
- Georges Santos, French footballer
- Georges Scelle, French judge
- Georges Schneider, Swiss alpine skier
- Georges Schoeters, Belgian resistance member
- Georges Schwizgebel, Swiss animation film director
- Georges Scott, French war correspondent and illustrator
- Georges Sébastian, French conductor
- Georges-Pierre Seurat, French painter
- Georges Simenon, Belgian writer
- Georges Sorel, French social thinker, political theorist, historian, and journalist
- Georges Speicher, French road bicycle racer
- Georges Spénale, French official and politician
- Georges St-Pierre, Canadian actor and former professional mixed martial artist
- Georges Stein, French painter
- Georges Stern, French jockey
- Georges Suarez, French writer, essayist and journalist
- Georges Sylvain, Haitian poet, lawyer and diplomat

=== T ===
- Georges Taillandier, French racing cyclist
- Georges Tanguay, Canadian politician
- Georges Tate, French ancient historian and archaeologist
- Georges Thenault, French pilot
- Georges Theunis, Belgian politician, prime minister 1921–1925 and 1934–1935
- Georges Thiébaud, French journalist, Bonapartist, and nationalist
- Georges Thierry d'Argenlieu, French Navy officer and admiral; Discalced Carmelite friar and priest
- Georges Thill, French opera singer
- Georges Thines, Belgian scientist
- Georges William Thornley, French painter and printmaker
- Georges Thurnherr, French gymnast
- Georges Thurston, Canadian singer, author, composer and radio show host
- Georges Touquet-Daunis, French athlete
- Georges Troisfontaines, Belgian writer and publisher
- Georges Turcot, Canadian politician

=== U ===
- Georges Urbain, French chemist

=== V ===
- Georges Vacher de Lapouge, French anthropologist, theoretician of eugenics and scientific racism
- Georges Valade, Canadian politician
- Georges Valensi, French telecommunications engineer
- Georges Valois, French journalist and national syndicalist politician
- Georges van Vrekhem, Belgian writer
- Georges Vandenberghe, Belgian cyclist
- Georges Vanier (disambiguation), several people
- Georges Vanier, Canadian governor general
- Georges Vantongerloo, Belgian visual artist
- Georges Vedel, French lawyer
- Georges Vereeken, Belgian socialist and politician
- Georges Verriest, French footballer
- Georges Vézina, Canadian ice hockey player
- Georges Vianès, French civil servant, corporate officer and politician
- Georges Vuilleumier, Swiss football player

=== W ===
- Georges Wakhévitch, Russian-born French art director
- Georges Wilson, French actor and film director
- Georges Wohlfart, Luxembourgish politician
- Georges Wolinski, French cartoonist and comics writer

=== Z ===
- Georges Zvunka, French football player and manager

== Surname ==
- Alphonse Joseph Georges (1875–1951), French army officer
- Annette Solange Georges (born 1957), Seychellois lawyer and politician
- Carla Georges, better known as simply Carla (born 2003), French singer
- Catherine Alicia Georges (born 1944), American nurse
- Julia Goerges (born 1988), German tennis player
- Myrtille Georges (born 1990), French tennis player
- Paul Georges (1923–2002), American painter
- Olga Georges-Picot (1940–1997), French actress

== Other names ==
- Paul Georges Dieulafoy (1839–1911), French physician and surgeon
- Marie-Georges Pascal (1946–1985), French actress
- Marie-George Buffet (born 1949), French politician
