= Lecointe (surname) =

Lecointe is a surname. Notable people with the surname include:

- Alphonse Lecointe (1817–1890), French general and politician
- Altheia Jones-LeCointe, (b. 1945) Trinidadian physician, research scientist, and British Black Panther Movement leader
- Antony Lecointe (born 1980), French football player
- Dominique Lecointe (born 1957), French rower
- Georges Lecointe (disambiguation), several people:
  - Georges Lecointe (explorer) (1869–1929), Belgian naval officer and explorer
  - Georges Lecointe (rower) (1897–1932), French rower
- Gérard Lecointe (1912–2009), French general
- Jean-François-Joseph Lecointe (1783–1858), French architect
- Joseph Sadi-Lecointe (1891–1944), French aviator
- Lucien Lecointe (1867–1940), French politician
- Matt Lecointe (born 1994), English football player
- Michel Mathieu Lecointe-Puyraveau (1764–1827), French politician

== See also ==
- Altheia Jones-LeCointe, (b. 1945) Trinidadian physician, research scientist, and British Black Panther Movement leader
- Joseph Sadi-Lecointe (1891–1944), French aviator
