= Georges Hébert =

French physical education pioneer (1875–1957)

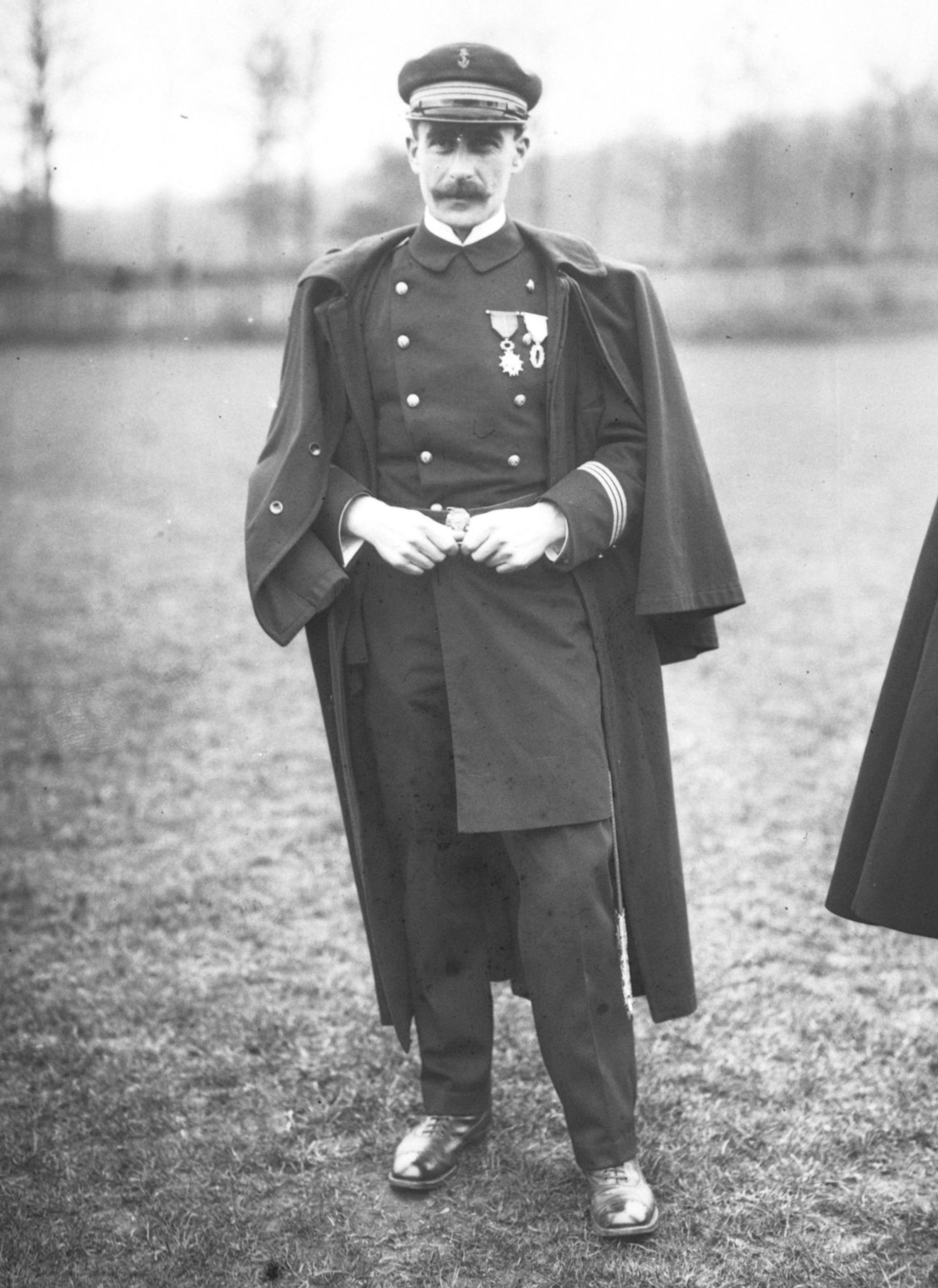
- Born: April 27, 1875; Paris, France
- Died: August 2, 1957 (aged 82); Tourgéville, Normandy, France

Georges Hébert (French: [ʒɔʁʒ ebɛʁ]; 27 April 1875 – 2 August 1957) was a pioneering physical educator in the French military who developed a system of physical education and training known as "la méthode naturelle" ("Natural Method") and a more wide training program known as Hebertism (built on his name). Hébert combined the training of a variety of physical capacities with the training of courage and ethics. His training methods strongly influenced the early philosophy of parkour.

== Early life ==
Hébert was born in Paris in 1875, which in historic terms was five years after the traumatic Franco-Prussian War and with the ferment of the start of the French Third Republic. Hébert's father was a breeder of horses for transportation vehicles in Paris, and through his father's interest in horses, Georges Hébert enjoyed attending equestrian performances in circuses when he was a child. The development of motorized vehicles ended his father's business, and his father subsequently moved to New Orleans where his family owned a bookshop. Adventure literature and access to travel spurred on Hébert's interest in a career in the navy.

=== Training in the French navy ===
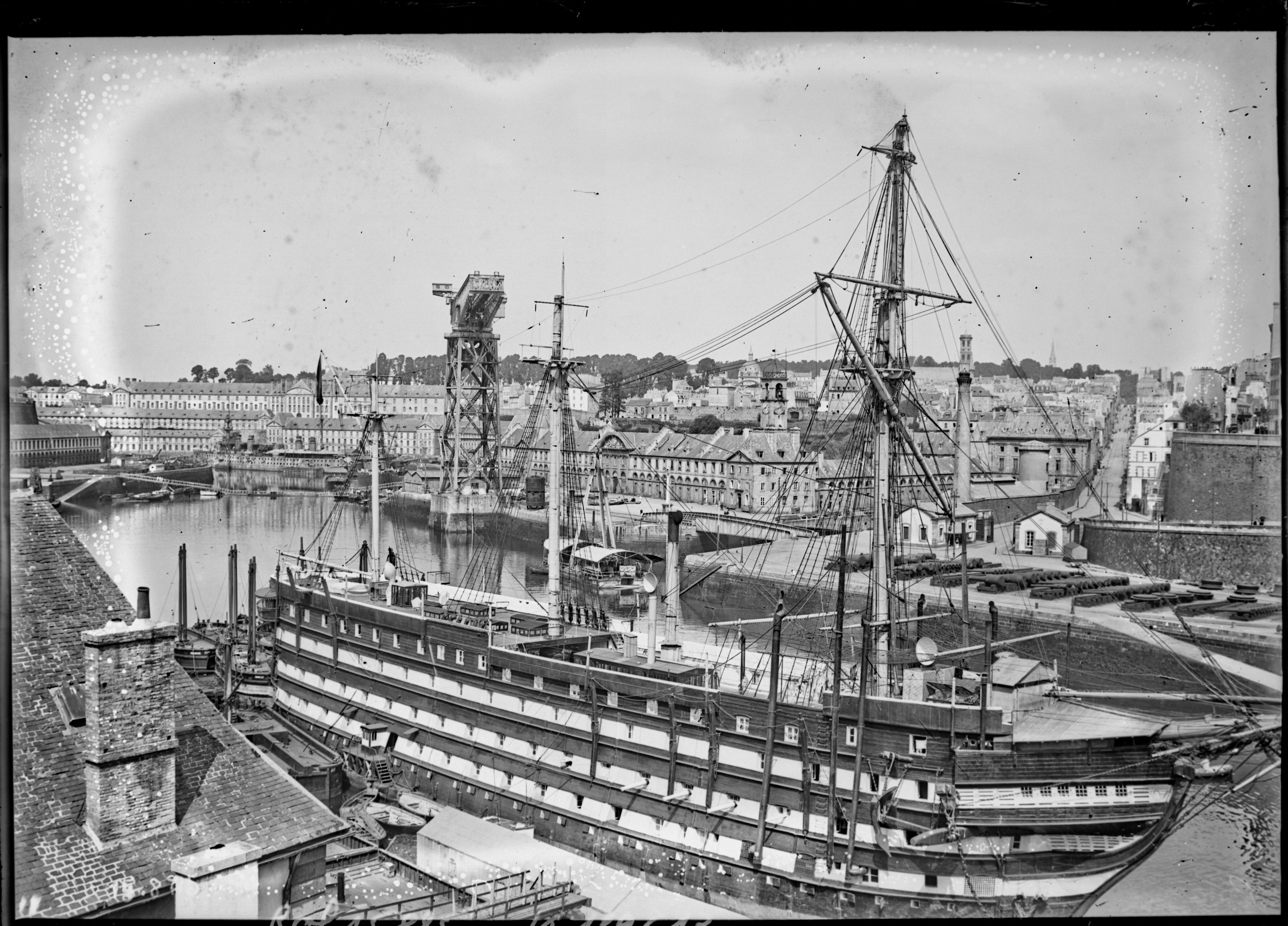
Training ship ("school ship") of the French navy, named the "Borda", from the time of the naval career of Hébert.

At age 18 Hébert entered the Naval School (École navale) in 1893 and completed the Naval School in 1896, and then he "navigated the seas" to the countries in South America, the West Indies and North America until 1903. His ranking at completion of the Naval School was sixtieth out of seventy-two graduates.

During his extensive travels, Hébert was impressed by the physical development and movement skills of indigenous peoples in Africa and elsewhere, writing:

"Their bodies were splendid, flexible, nimble, skillful, enduring, resistant and yet they had no other tutor in gymnastics but their lives in nature."

Hébert witnessed another example of this physical competence when he saw that French farmworkers could "outrun and outlive athletes" during the First World War.

=== Rescue efforts following the volcanic eruption on the island of Martinique ===
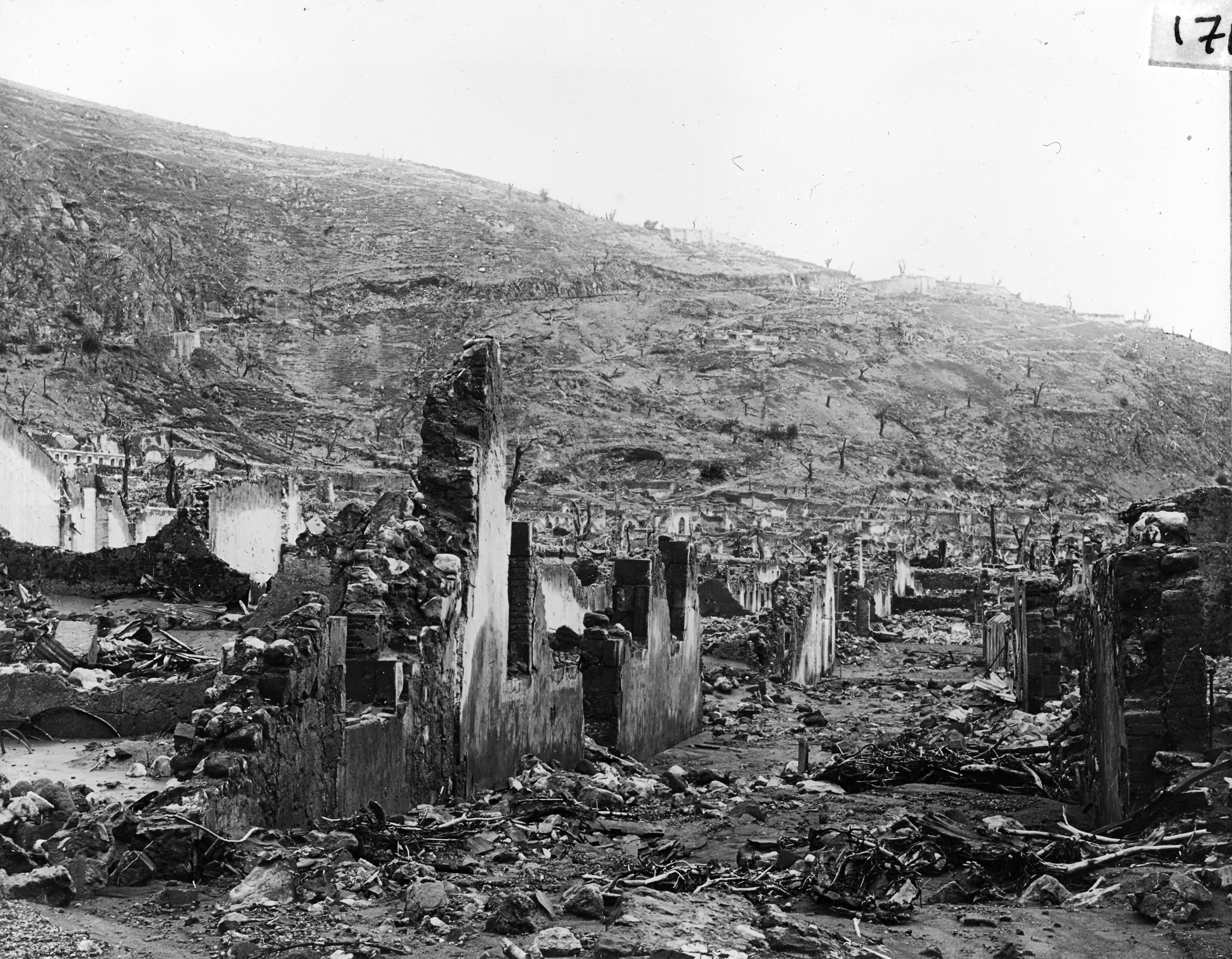
Ruins of the town of St. Pierre following the 1902 volcanic eruption.

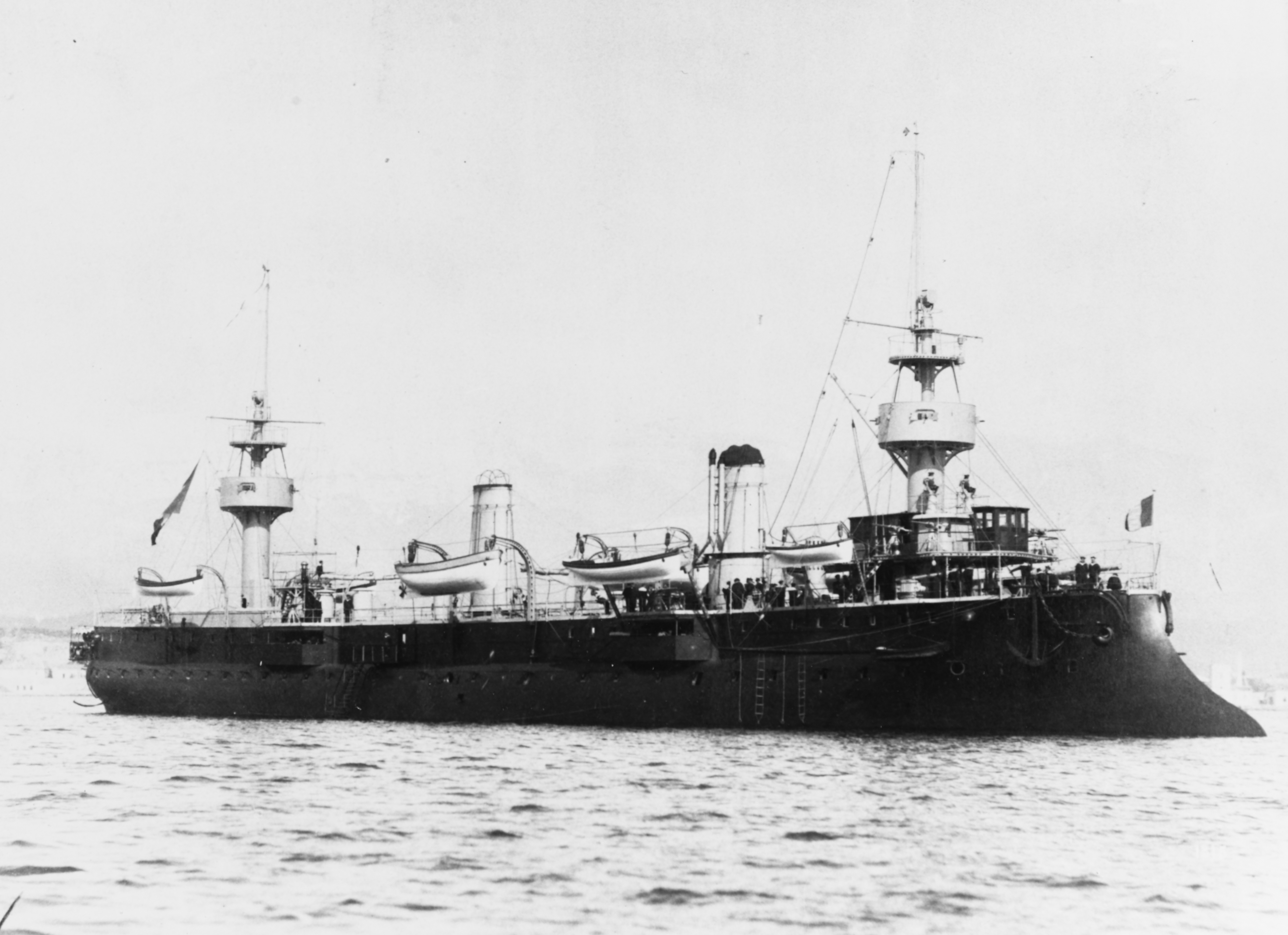
French cruiser "Suchet" on which Hébert was stationed. The "Suchet" helped rescue victims of the volcanic eruption at the Caribbean island of Martinique.

When he was 27 years old, as an officer in the French Navy prior to the First World War, he was at the island of Martinique in the Caribbean Sea.

On May 8, 1902, the town of St. Pierre on Martinique fell victim to a catastrophic volcanic eruption from Mount Pelée. At the time of the major volcanic eruption, Hébert was on shore leave about 30 kilometers away. His own ship the "Suchet" had already left port to head for St. Pierre, so he boarded another ship in order to reach St. Pierre to help survivors. Hébert helped coordinate the escape and rescue of some seven hundred people from this disaster. This experience had a profound effect on him, and reinforced his belief that athletic skill must be combined with courage and altruism. He eventually developed this ethos into his personal motto, "Être fort pour être utile" ("Be strong to be helpful").

== Hébertism ==
Hébertism as known today is the fruit of a lifetime's work. There are significant differences between Hébert's early books and the later volumes. His later ideas best represent the complete evolution of his thought.

=== Predecessors ===
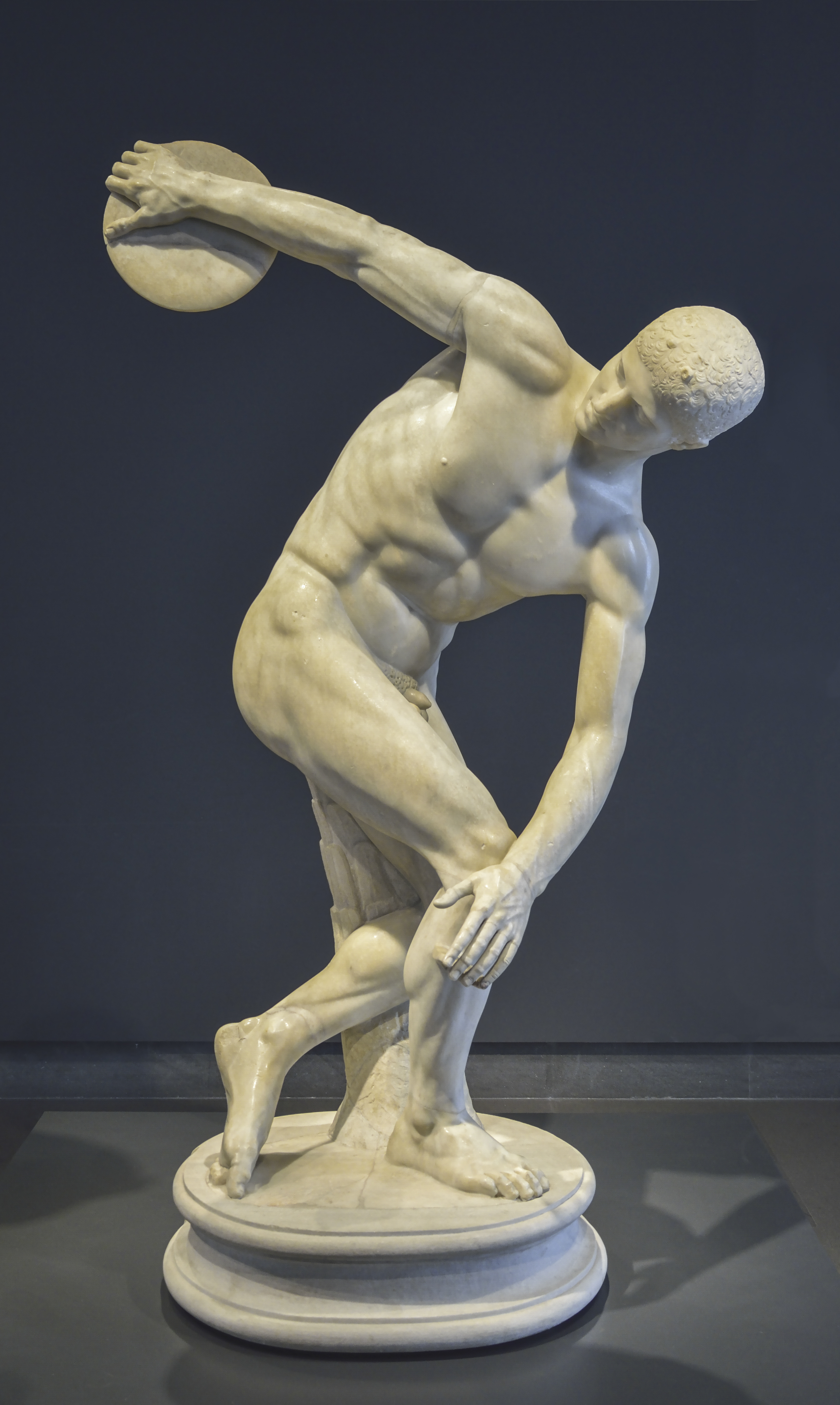
For one of Hébert's early books (Guide pratique d'éducation physique), he had a photograph taken of himself in this exact pose as shown by this Classical sculpture-- the Discobolus-- and the photograph was used on the cover of the book.

In addition to his observations of the natural movements of indigenous people, Hébert's method synthesized various influences, including but not limited to:

- The work of his predecessor Francisco Amorós (1770-1848), who published in 1847 Nouveau Manuel Complet d'Education Physique, Gymnastique et Morale ("New Complete Manual of Physical Education for Gymnastics and Morals"), which already encompassed a full range of practical movement skills.
- The work of German Prussian gymnastics educator Friedrich Ludwig Jahn (1778–1852), which was also an influence on the early physical training of the United States Marine Corps.
- The classical representations of the human body in Graeco-Roman statuary and by the ideals of the ancient Greek gymnasia.
- The "naturist" lifestyle principles of his friend Paul Carton (1875–1947), a French physician.
- The influence of Georges Demenÿ (1850–1917), a French inventor, chronophotographer, filmmaker, and gymnast who emphasized the progressivity and the scalability of the training.
- The founder of the modern olympic games, Pierre de Coubertin (1863–1937), who was among Hébert's early supporters.
- The French sculptor Auguste Rodin (1840–1917).

=== Early development ===
Hébert's reform of physical education consisted of replacing the gymnastic methods (movements which were more static and repetitive) which were in vogue with "natural" or "utilitarian" activities. From 1904 to 1912, Hébert "test-piloted" his training system on one thousand Marine fusiliers at the French military school in Lorient (École du Bataillon de Lorient), with a turnover of half the population of soldiers every six months, and in 1908 he also tested his method with 800 adolescents from 14 to 17 years old at a school, and then with about twenty instructors and fifty girls in 1913 at the "College d'athlètes" (his new training facility).

As a sidelight, as an "accomplished gymnast," in 1904 Hébert performed in an acrobatic act on a fixed bar at the amateur circus of Ernest Molier (1844-1933), known as the "Cirque Molier."

=== "Collège d'athlètes" ("Athletes' College" physical education training center) ===
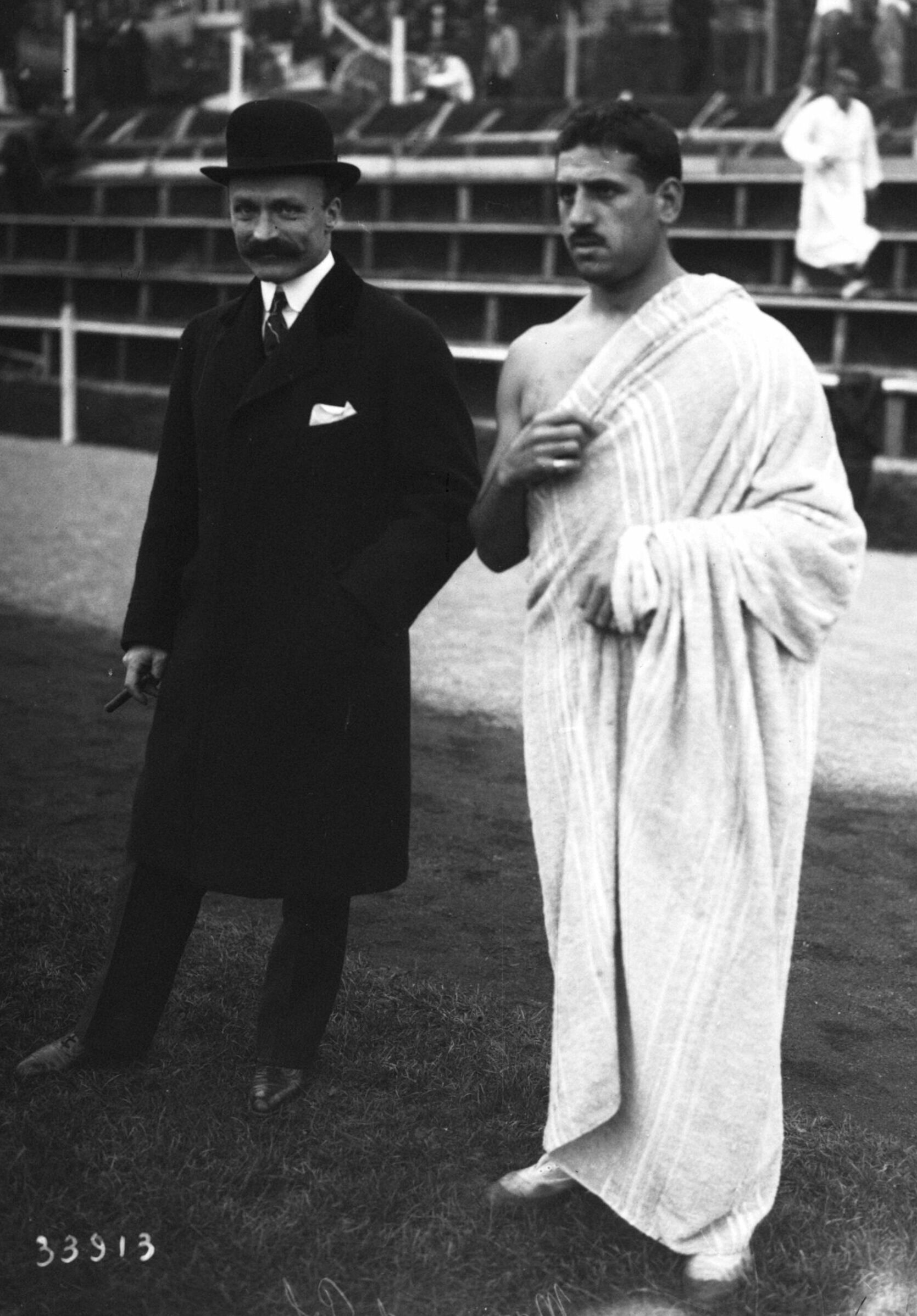
The Marquis de Polignac with the athlete Jean Bouin (standing at the right) at the Collège d'athlètes in 1913.

In March 1913 a large government-sponsored physical education conference was held in Paris. The conference was called "Congrès international de l'éducation physique" (the "International Congress of Physical Education"). The sport exhibition also included contemporary art, including the sculptures of Auguste Rodin.

There were gymnastic demonstrations from many nations around the world, and there was an outdoor demonstration by 350 males, aged from seven to twenty-two, who were trained in the method of Hébert. The performance of those trained by Hébert received public acclaim. (Note: Quotation from a contemporary newspaper article: The New York Times; Wed., April 2, 1913; title of the article: "A Peace Army": At the International Congress of Physical Education recently held at Paris the increase of public concern for the welfare and efficiency of the rising generation was made manifest to a striking degree. The most interesting among the various demonstrations of what has been done to further physical education in France, Sweden, Belgium, and elsewhere seems to have been that given by the pupils, apprentices, and riflemen of the French Navy. This demonstration consisted of exercises given under the supervision of Lieut. HEBERT, which were exact counterparts of the daily exercises followed in a large number of naval schools where the Hébert, or "natural," method of physical education is practiced... Their appearance produced a profound impression. Their chests were broad, their color was healthy, their muscles were hard. They marched with a well-disciplined and firm bearing. They went first erect and stiffly, then supple and relaxed, next half bending, and finally on all fours. They also climbed ropes, lifted weights proportioned to their strength, and, without pausing in their exercises, practiced different kinds of breathing as a means of rest.) His training method had been the result of "rigorous, long years of observations from four work sessions per week... multiple [performance] measurements, [with] individual sheets to note progress of each [trainee] and of a statistical treatment which...[gave] birth to the first serious rating table to assess the progress made." In 1912, a committee had been set up to found a national physical education training center. Following the demonstration of Hébert's students at the Paris sports conference, in April 1913 the committee appointed Hébert as director of the newly formed training center which was called Collège d'athlètes ("Athletes' College"), located in Reims, in north-east France.

The training center was officially inaugurated by the President of France Raymond Poincaré (1860-1934) in October, 1913. The Collège d'athlètes was funded by the Marquis de Polignac (1880-1950) and was built inside the Pommery park (later renamed as "Parc de Champagne") which he had previously opened in 1910. It took six months to construct the training facility, which included an oval running track, an indoor gymnasium measuring 40 meters by 20 meters and an outdoor swimming pool, along with boxing rings and fencing halls.

=== The 3–10–15 ===
Most of the philosophy of Hébertisme can be found in the first seven chapters of Volume 1 of "La Méthode Naturelle" (Full book title: L'éducation physique virile et morale par la méthode naturelle ["Virile and Moral Physical Education by the Natural Method"]).

It can be summarized by the "3–10–15" approach to fitness:

==== 3 main components for training ====
- Physical training: Heart, lungs, and muscles, but also speed, dexterity, endurance, resistance, and balance.
- Mental training: energy, willpower, courage, coolness, firmness
- Ethical behavior: friendship, collective work, altruism

==== 10 families of practical exercise ====
1. walking
2. running
3. crawling (quadrupedy)
4. climbing
5. jumping
6. balance
7. lifting and carrying
8. throwing
9. defence (wrestling, boxing)
10. swimming

==== 15 principles for training ====
1. Continuity of work and exercises
2. Alternating opposite efforts: fast/slow, intense/relaxed...
3. Progression of the intensity of efforts during the training
4. Initial warmup before training and final cool-down after training
5. Individualization of efforts (i.e., adapting the difficulty to each one's level)
6. Working with flexibility, relaxing inactive muscles (relax your mind)
7. Proper posture and sufficient breathing
8. Complete freedom of motion, even in group work – avoiding collective or synchronized movements
9. Cultivation of speed and skill
10. Correction of individual weaknesses
11. Taking advantage of open air and sun, obtaining the hardening benefits of the elements
12. Allowing the group to express joy and happiness
13. Cultivating the qualities of action (e.g., courage, willpower, cool headedness, firmness) by the execution of difficult exercises, for example, while seeking to control the fear of falling, of jumping, of rising, of plunging, of walking on an unstable surface, etc.
14. Cultivation of altruistic behaviour (e.g., altruism, collective work, mutual aid)
15. Cultivation of self-improvement via healthy competition

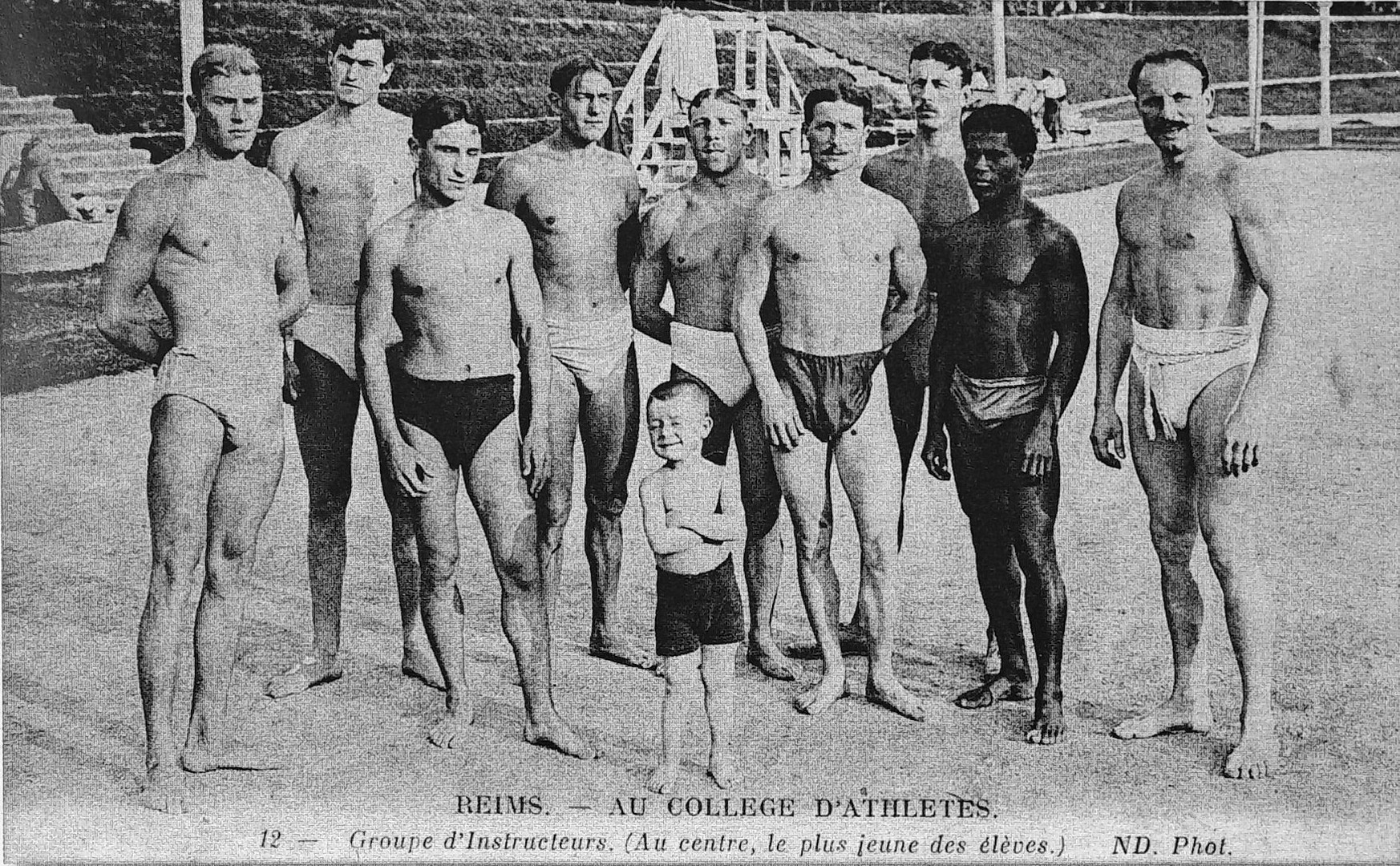
Instructors at the Collège d'athlètes (1914)

The ten families of movement were ideally to be performed in the following conditions: "the movements should be continuous, at a rapid and sustained pace and progressing over rugged terrain in a natural environment." The exercises were to be performed in "near nudity" (bare torso and legs) which improved physical endurance by being exposed to the elements; it also allowed for the trainer to more easily see how a movement was being performed in order to correct it.

Hébert wrote:

The final goal of physical education is to make strong beings. In the purely physical sense, the Natural Method promotes the qualities of organic resistance, muscularity and speed, towards being able to walk, run, jump, move on all fours, to climb, to keep balance, to throw, lift, defend yourself and to swim.

In the "virile" or energetic sense, the system consists in having sufficient energy, willpower, courage, coolness, and firmness.

In the moral sense, education, by elevating the emotions, directs or maintains the moral drive in a useful and beneficial way.

The true Natural Method, in its broadest sense, must be considered as the result of these three particular forces; it is a physical, virile and moral synthesis. It resides not only in the muscles and the breath, but above all in the "energy" which is used, the will which directs it and the feeling which guides it.

Differentiating Hebertism and other physical activities

== Expansion of Hébertism ==
Hébert's full "holistic" teaching approach consisted of six modules: (1) intensive use of the Natural Method (NM) physical exercises, (2) daily manual crafts, (3) mental and moral culture ("psychic gymnastics"), (4) intellectual culture (e.g., history of philosophy and sciences), (5) esthetic culture (e.g., the arts, "Atlantean studies" (connected with the teachings of Paul Le Cour (1871-1954)), dance, rhythmic movement (where music follows movement rather than controls movement), and (6) naturist modalities such as nutrition, hydrotherapy, and heliotherapy.

In an interview a few months before Hébert's death, he explained the difference between Hébertism and the "Natural Method." He said "the natural method is not Hebertism and it should not be called so." He pointed out that the "natural method" is "as old as the world," and that "Hebertism is something else." Hébert said that "it is the philosophy that must emerge from this natural method to encourage the individual to put at the service of others what he can derive from his physical and virile training. This therefore goes far beyond the framework of a physical culture to become a true education, an essential linking of the physical and the moral."

== World War I ==
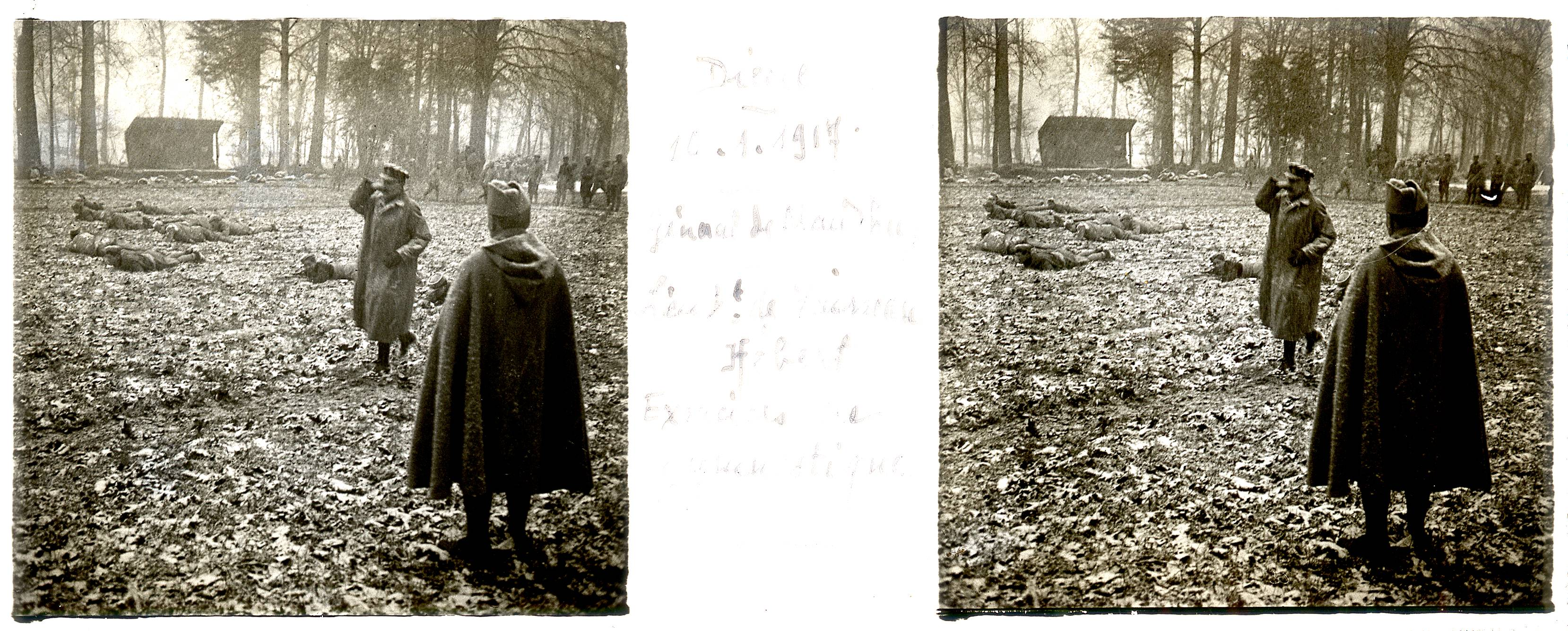
Physical exercises in an undergrowth near Dieue-sur-Meuse (Meuse). January 16, 1917. The exercises are led by General Maudhuy and Hébert, visible in the foreground. (The image is double because it was originally a stereoscopic photograph).

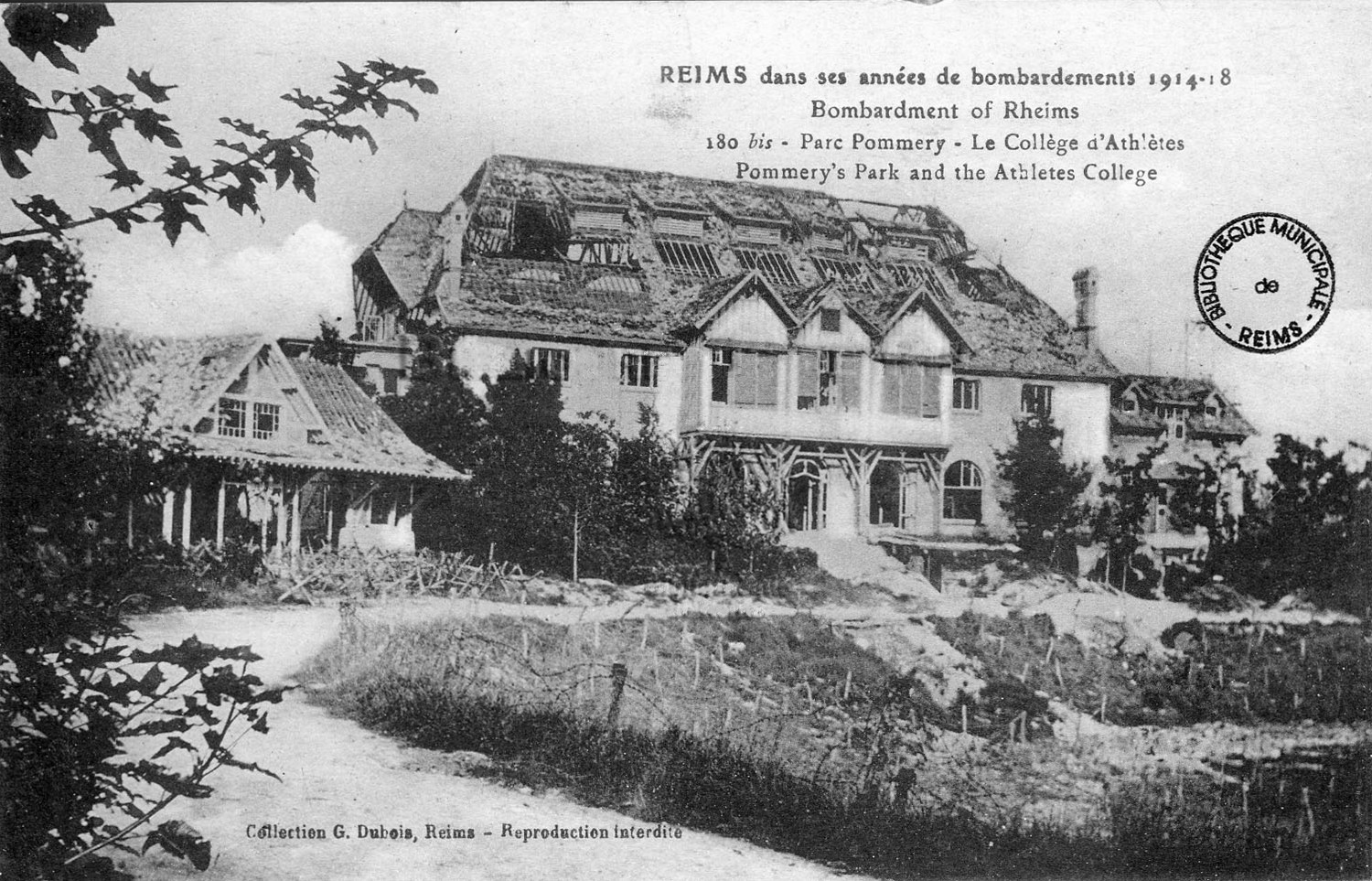
Example of the destruction from the war at the Collège d'athlètes in Reims.

Hébert was wounded in November, 1914 when he went into combat with a company of fusilier marines at the Battle of Diksmuide in Belgium during the First World War. He was shot in the left arm which left his arm severely disabled During World War 1 his training center, "Collège d'athlètes," was destroyed during frontline fighting and most of his "natural method" coaches had been killed in battle.

== Marriage ==
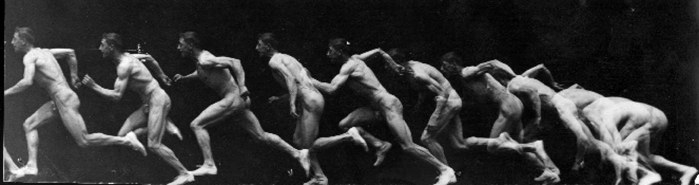
"Chronophotography" by Demenÿ, who was the former gymnastics teacher of Yvonne Moreau prior to her marriage with Hébert

In 1924 Hébert married Yvonne Moreau. She was a former gymnastics student of Demenÿ. In 1913 she became "Chief Instructor" at Hébert's "Collège d'athlètes."

In 1918 Hébert founded the "Palestra" which was a physical education training center for women and children near Deauville, on the coast in northern France, where Yvonne became a director. It is at the "Palestra" where "Hébertism" came to fruition. The schedule of daily activities provides an example of how Hébertism was carried out on a practical level. (Note: Excerpt from the article "Hebertist Palestra: Physical Education for Women, Leisure and Natural Lifestyle" by Pierre Philippe-Meden, 12 September 2019: 07:00 Wake-up call, getting washed and dressed, cleaning the rooms. 07:50 Roundup. A quick, short run through the forest. 08:15 Breakfast. 08:30-09:15 Roundup. Small housekeeping and gardening tasks. 09:15-10:00 Complete physical training class. 10:00-10:15 Break. 10:15-11:30 Completion of earlier manual tasks or starting new ones such as sewing, cooking, etc. 11:30-12:15 Rest, except for the girls in charge of designated tasks. 12:15-14:15 Lunch and rest. 14:15-16:00 Classes on topics related to physical education, hygiene, art, ancient history, etc. 16:00-16:30 Variety of games or in particular throwing games. 16:30-16:45 Afternoon tea. 16:45-18:00 Rhythmic dances and songs. 18:00-19:30 Rest. 19:30 Dinner. 20:30 Meeting in the hall. Reading. Parlour games. Once or twice a week: outdoor explorations.) (The word "palestra" is derived from the Latin word for "gymnasium.") The training center on the northern coast of France was open only for six months a year during the summer. In 1923 Hébert thus created a winter "palestra" in the southern French Riviera. Then in 1929 Hébert also created a "Women's Nautical School" or "marine palestra" aboard a ship. This training was intended for boys under age 14 and for girls of any age.

Georges and Yvonne Hébert had two children: Jeanne and Régis. Yvonne Hébert died in 1975. Régis Hébert died in 2017. The eldest son of Régis is Jacques Hébert.

== Legacy and influence ==
Georges Hébert's teaching continued to expand between and during the two World Wars, becoming the standard system of French military physical education.

He was also an early advocate of the benefits of exercise for women. In his work Muscle and Plastic Beauty, which appeared in 1921, Hébert criticized not only the fashion of wearing corsets but also the physical inactivity imposed upon women by contemporary European society. By following the natural method of synthesized physical, energetic and moral development, he wrote, women could develop self-confidence, willpower and athletic ability just as well as their male counterparts.

Hébert wrote:

A (Natural Method) session is composed of exercises belonging to the ten fundamental groups: walking, running, jumping, quadrupedal movement, climbing, equilibrium (balancing), throwing, lifting, defending and swimming.

A training session consists, then, of exercises in an outdoor environment, perhaps a few hundred meters to several kilometers, during which, one walks, one runs, one jumps, one progresses quadrupedally, one climbs, one walks in unstable balance, one raises and one carries, one throws, one fights and one swims.

This course can be carried out in two ways:

1. the natural or spontaneous way; i.e., on an unspecified route through the countryside.
2. within an especially designed environment.

All of the exercises can be carried out while progressing through this environment. A session can last from 20 to 60 minutes.

Thus, Hébert was among the earliest proponents of le parcours, or obstacle course, form of physical training, which is now standard in the military and has led to the development of civilian fitness trails and confidence courses. In fact, woodland challenge courses comprising balance beams, ladders, rope swings and so-on are often still described as "Hébertism" or "Hébertisme" courses both in Europe and in North America. It may even be possible to trace modern adventure playground equipment back to Hébert's original designs in the early 1900s.

As a former sailor, Hébert may have patterned some of his "stations" on the obstacles that are found on the deck of a ship; he was also a strong proponent of "natural" or spontaneous training in non-designed environments.

Hébert publicly condemned sport after the Olympic games in Paris in 1924. His view was that sport is "corrupted, not educational and immoral because of issues such as professionalization of sport, merchandising" and "unnecessary public exposure...of the athletes." In 1925, he published a book entitled Le sport contre l'éducation physique ("Sport versus Physical Education"). Hébert denounced the harms of modern sport due to its promoting specialization of movement, its "showmanship," and money (instead of altruism). At this time he broke with the modern Olympic movement founder de Coubertin. Hébert was not against using sport in physical education, but he felt that any conceited or selfish behavior arising from it should be contained.

In the mid-1930s he gradually withdrew himself from a wider involvement in society and in 1938 he broke with the so-called Hebertist movement (as exemplified by the "Groupement hébertiste") rather than be tied to a specific organization.

The "Palestra," which was Hébert's training center for women and children, near Deauville, France was destroyed by bombardment during World War 2.

The year 1955 marked the fiftieth anniversary of the Natural Method, and Hébert was named Commander of the Legion of Honor by the French government in recognition of his many services to his country. In 1953, Hébert had a stroke which affected his speech, but he relearned how to walk, speak and write. He died from a heart attack on August 2, 1957, at age 82 in Tourgéville, Calvados, France. His wife Yvonne Hébert died in 1975.

One researcher into the life and work of Hébert described him as being a "singular personality...at once brilliant, inventive, pugnacious, intransigent and dogmatic." Hébert called for "empiricism against scientism, syntheticism against analyticism, utilitarianism against Olympism."

There are still schools and gymnasia throughout Europe and elsewhere that are promoting the Natural Method of physical training, some maintaining their own elaborate "parcours" in natural surroundings, such as the Belgian Federation of Methode Naturelle (Fédération Belge d'Hébertisme) known as "Sport'nat."

Most recently, Hébert's teachings have been an important influence on the emergence of parkour (by David Belle) as a training discipline in its own right, as well as being an influence on Sebastian Foucan's "Freerunning," and "Athletic Explorations" by John-Edouard Ehlinger. Hébert stated that his method was based on observation and experiment and that therefore it could be perfected over time. Hébert expected that how well a person could perform a movement would improve as a result of an increased training volume (doing more of that activity) and consequently technical instruction was made secondary. But in light of current training methods, "the process of learning and improvement must be based on optimum technique right from the start." As one effort in building on Hébert's work, in the first decade of the 21st century, the French American physical education instructor Erwan Le Corre took inspiration from Hébert's "méthode naturelle" ("natural method") and has expanded on the training to form a system of natural movement which he has named "MovNat".

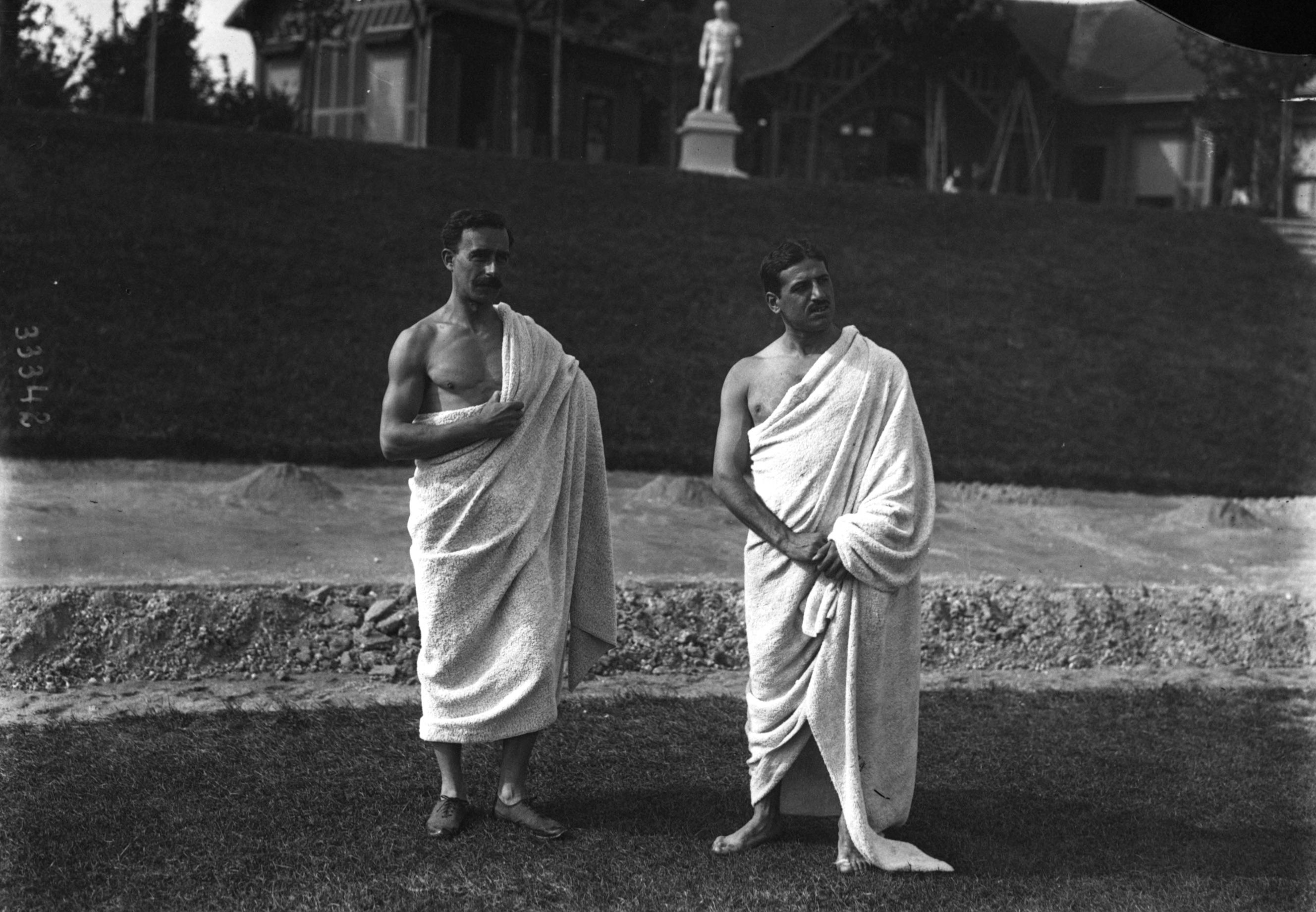
(1913) Reims, France; Collège d'athlètes. Hébert is standing to the left. The man to the right is Jean Bouin, the French mid-distance Olympic runner, who died at age 25 while fighting in the French army during the opening weeks of World War I, in the year 1914.

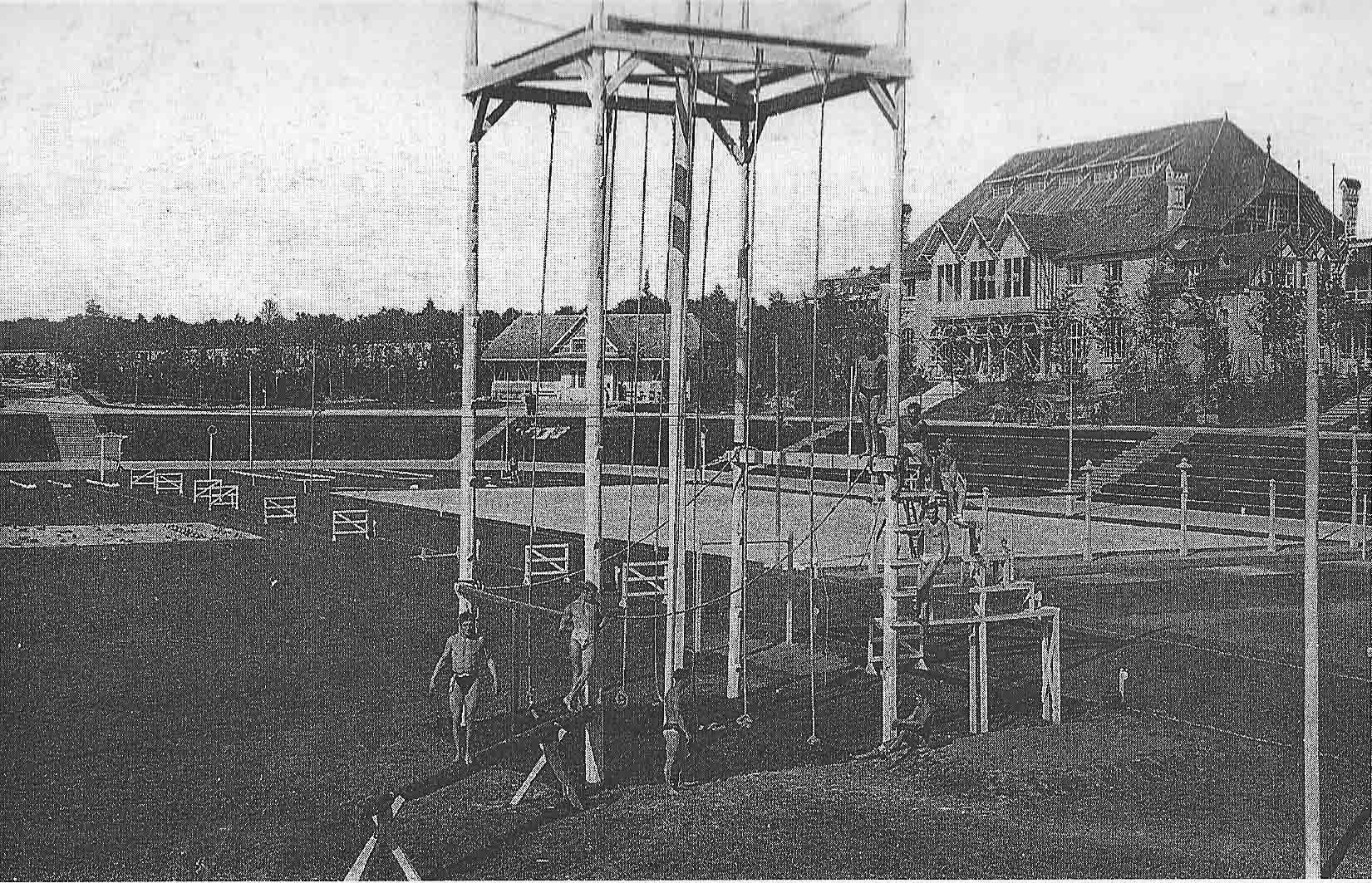
Collège d'athlètes ("Athletes' College") was a physical education training center opened in the city of Reims, in north-east France, in 1913. The center operated according to the principles of Georges Hébert. The training center was destroyed during World War I.

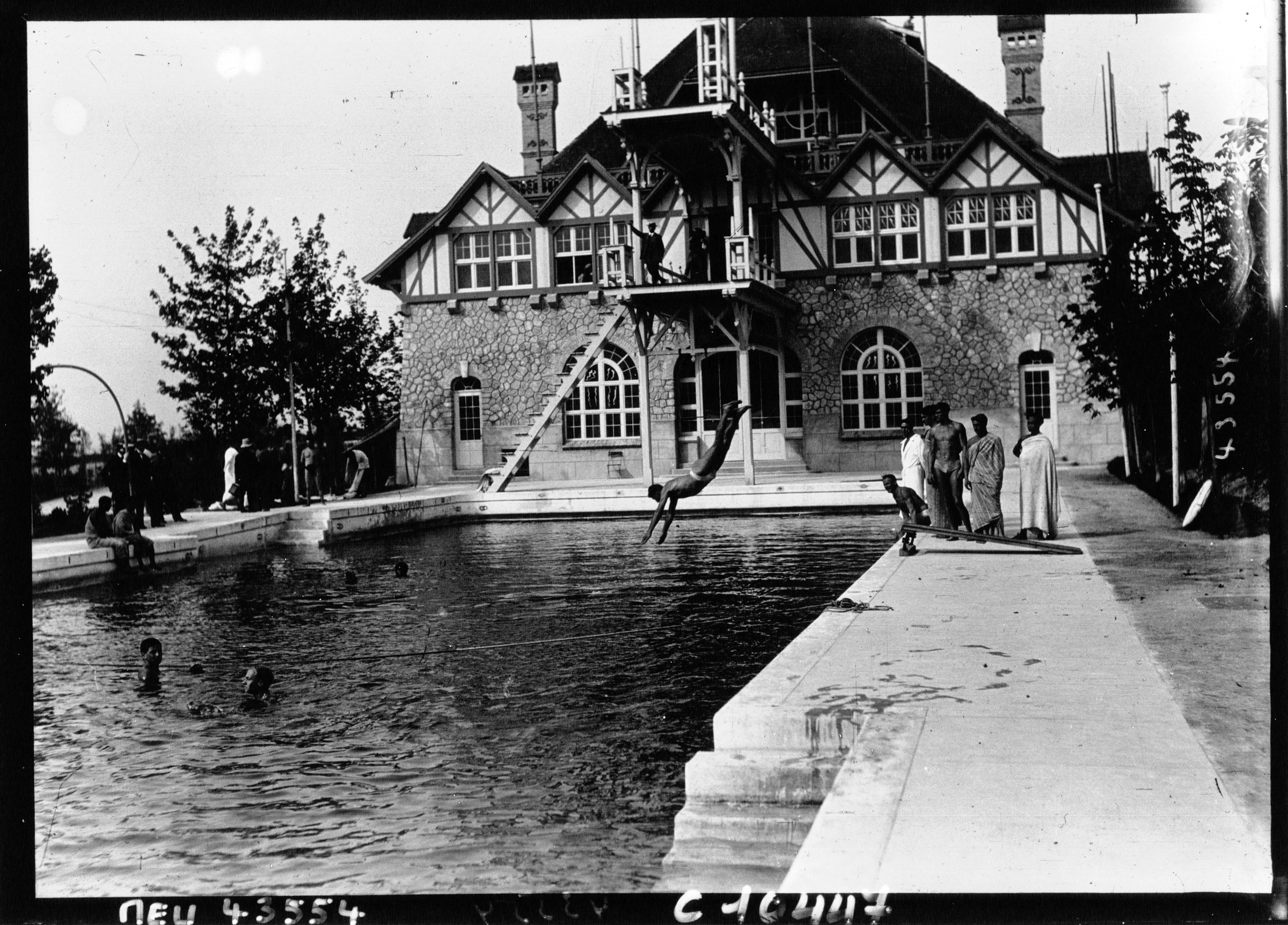
(1913) Reims, France; Collège d'athlètes. The swimming pool, located to the side of the large indoor training facility (gymnasium).

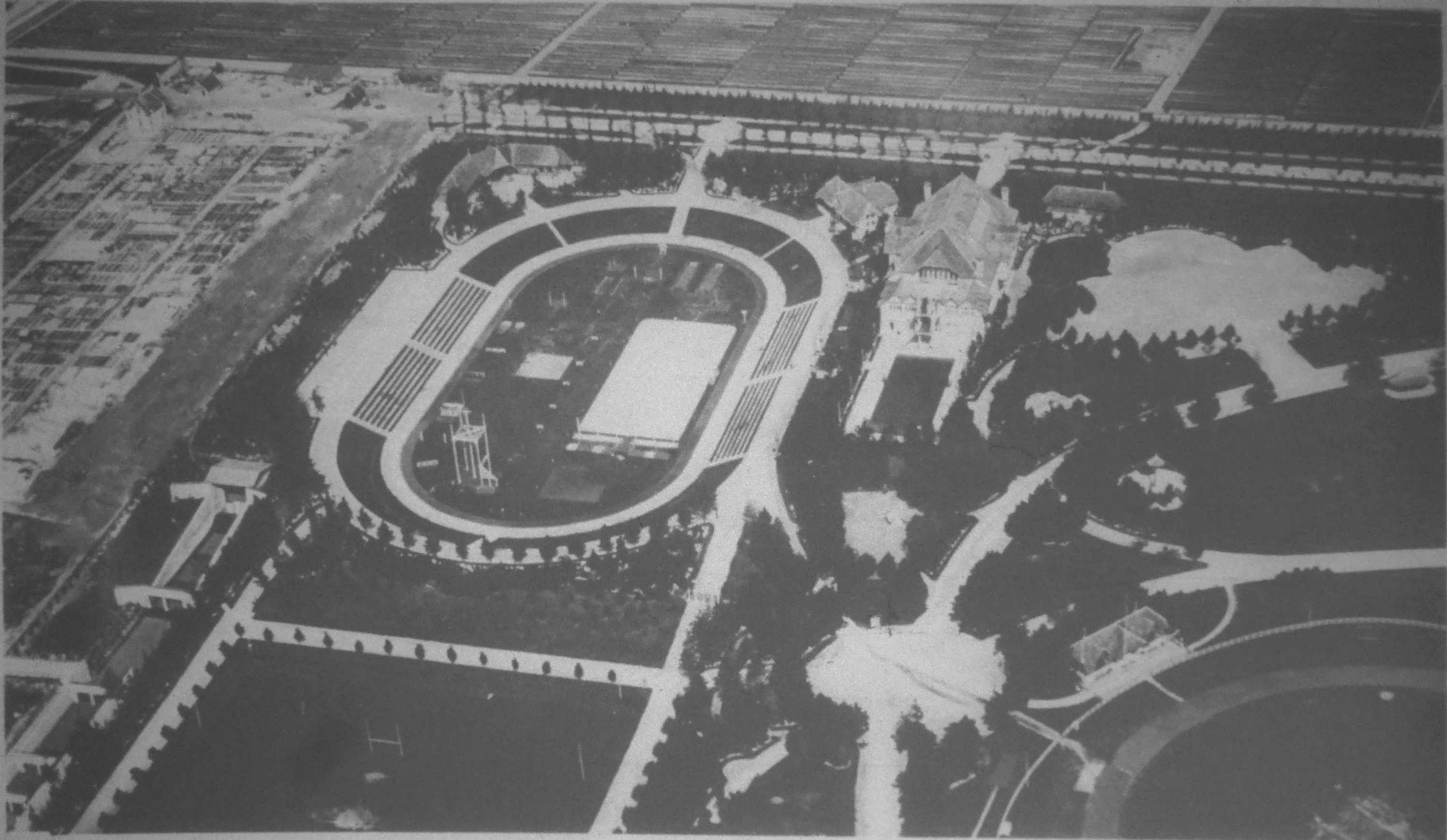
Aerial view of the Collège d'athlètes.

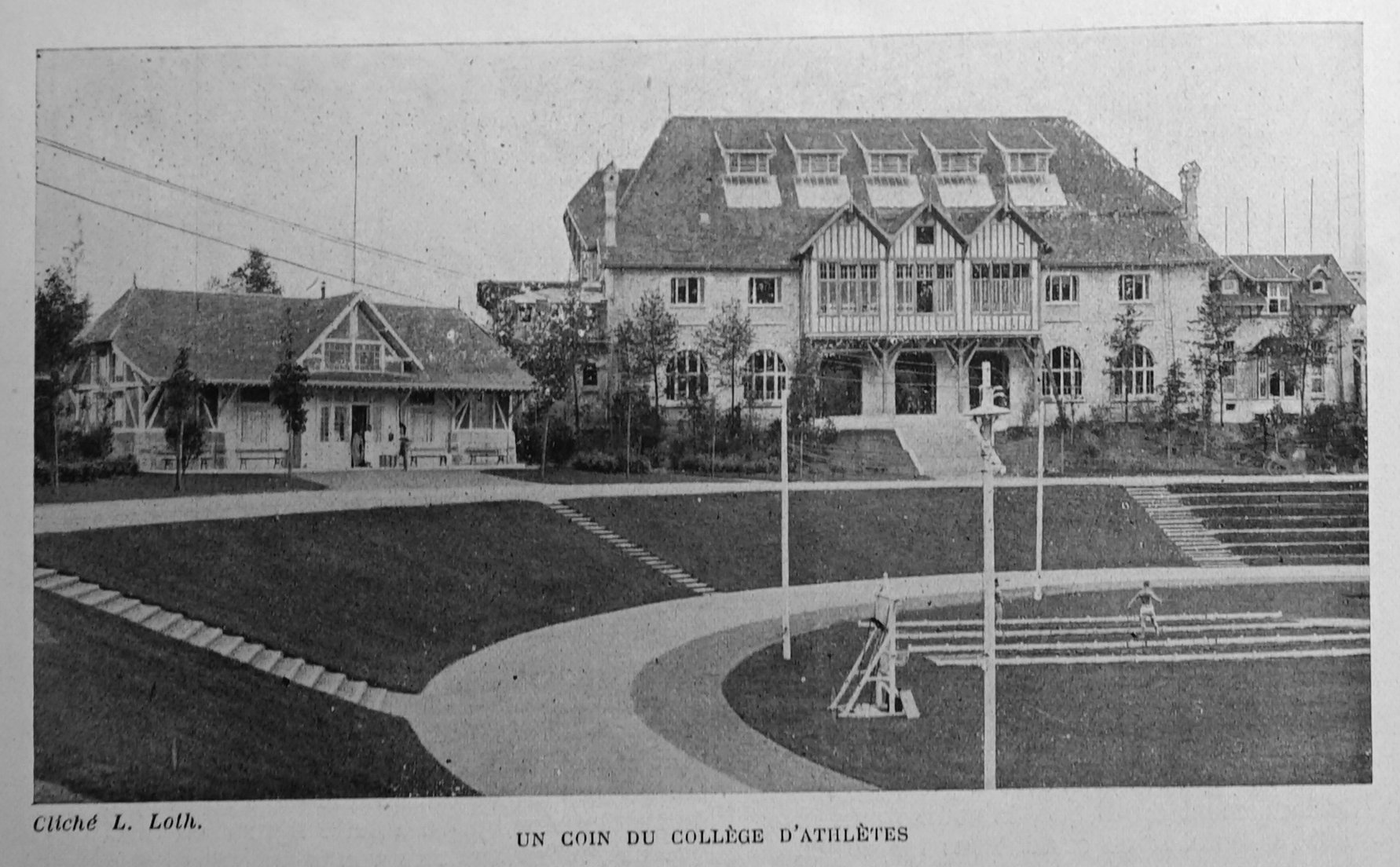
Oval running track and large indoor gymnasium, Collège d'athlètes (1914)

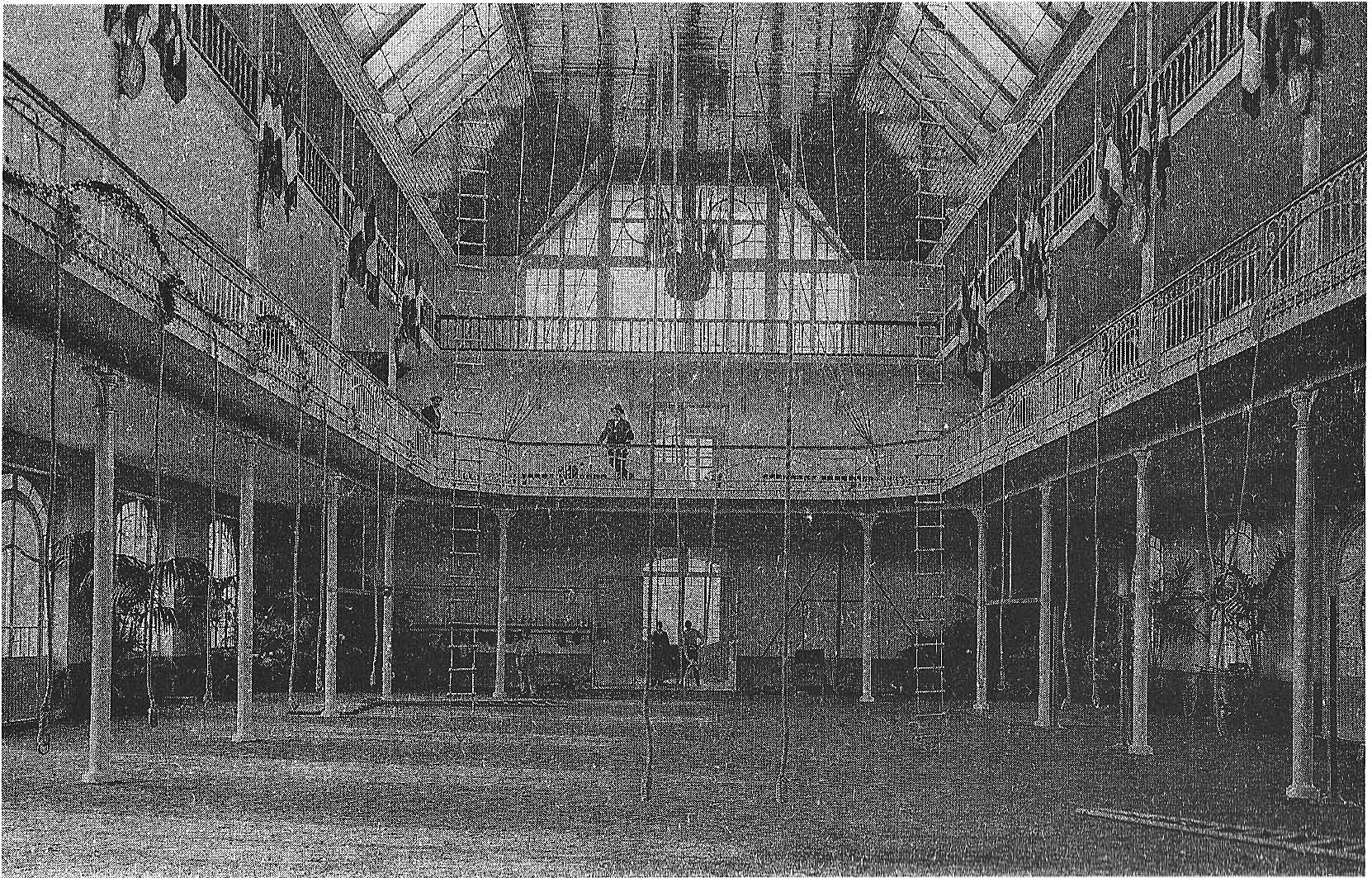
The interior of the gymnasium at the Collège d'athlètes

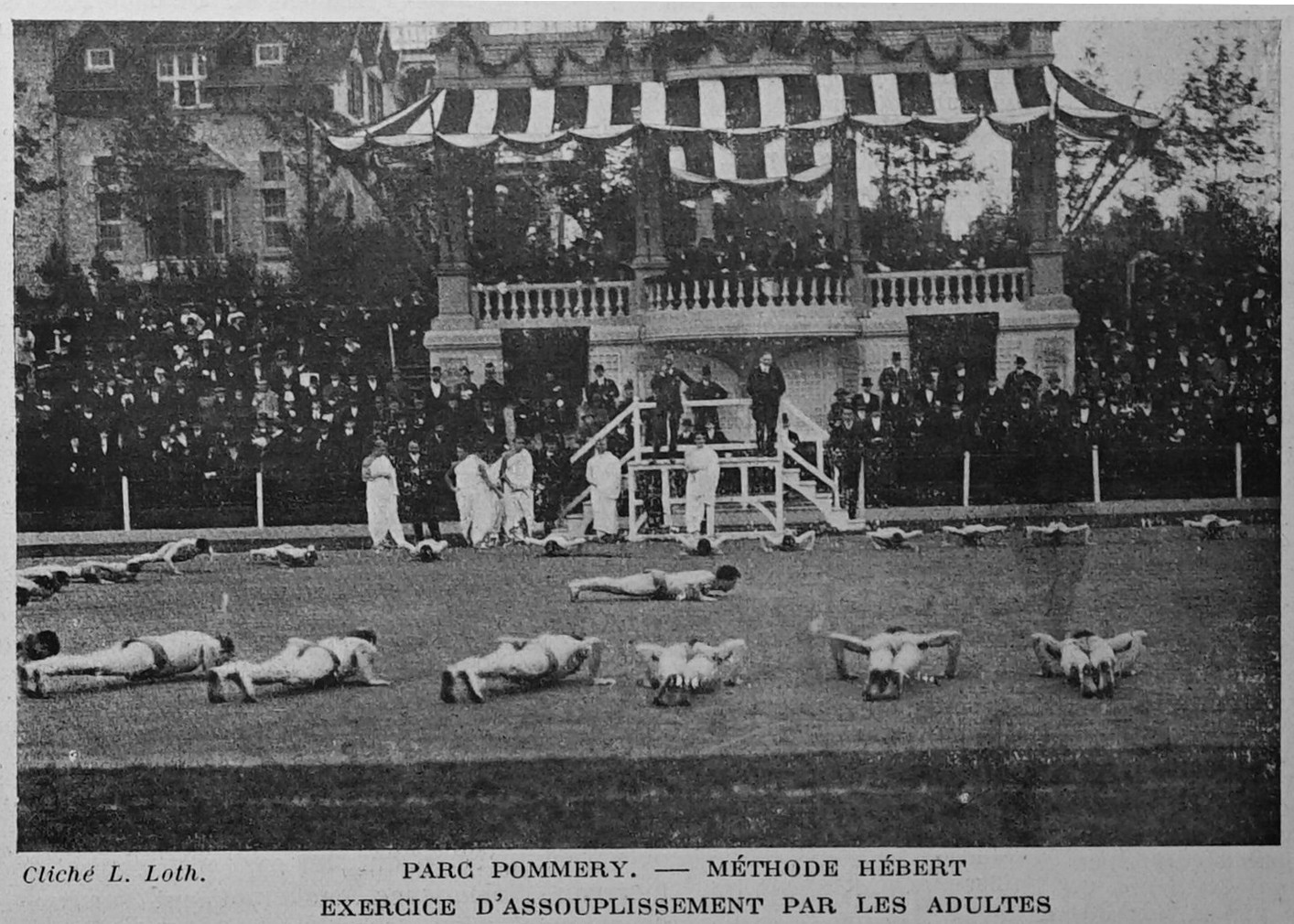
"Stretching exercise" in front of the reviewing stand at the Collège d'athlètes (1913)

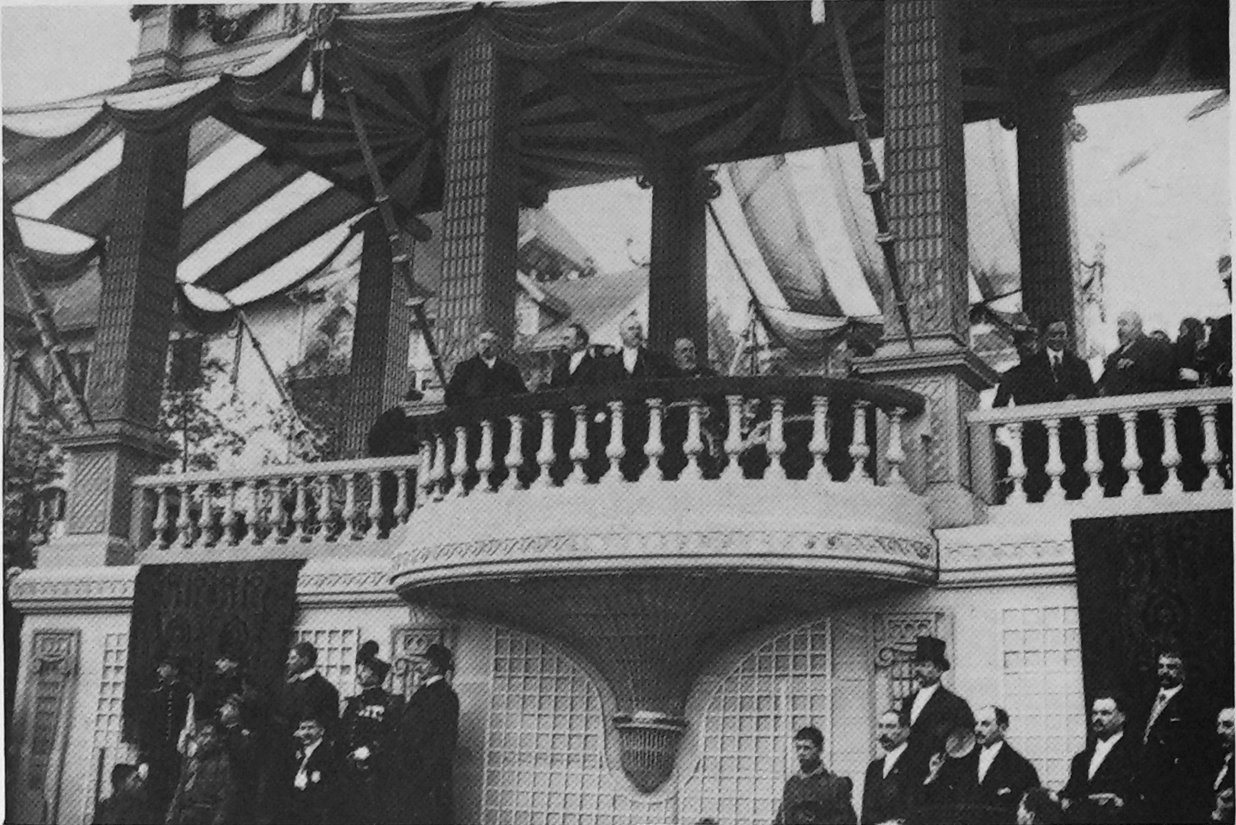
The President of France inaugurating the Collège d'athlètes (October, 1913)

== Publications ==
Selected publications; the publications listed are all in French

- (1910; 2nd edition: 1912) Guide pratique d'éducation physique ("Practical Guide to Physical Education").
- (1912) L'éducation physique ou l'entrainement complet par la méthode naturelle ("Physical Education or Complete Training by the Natural Method"). Published in Librairie Vuibert Paris, 85 pp.
- (1918) L'Entraînement physique complet par la méthode naturelle. Guide abrégé du moniteur chargé de l'entraînement dans les écoles, les sociétés de sport et de gymnastique, et en général dans les groupements de toutes sortes d'enfants ou d'adultes ("Complete physical training by the natural method. Abridged guide for the instructor in charge of training in schools, sports and gymnastic societies, and in general in groups of all kinds of children or adults").
- (1919) L'Éducation physique féminine. Muscle et Beauté plastique ("Women's Physical Education. Muscle and 'Structure' of Beauty").
- (1936–1959) L'éducation physique virile et morale par la méthode naturelle ("Virile and Moral Physical Education by the Natural Method.") 5 volumes.
  - Volume 1: Doctrinal Statement and Guiding Principles of Work.
  - Volume 2: Technique of Exercises. Technology. Walking. Running. Jumping.
  - Volume 3: Crawling. Climbing. Balancing.
  - Volume 4: Lifting. Throwing. Defending.
  - Volume 5: Swimming (published posthumously)

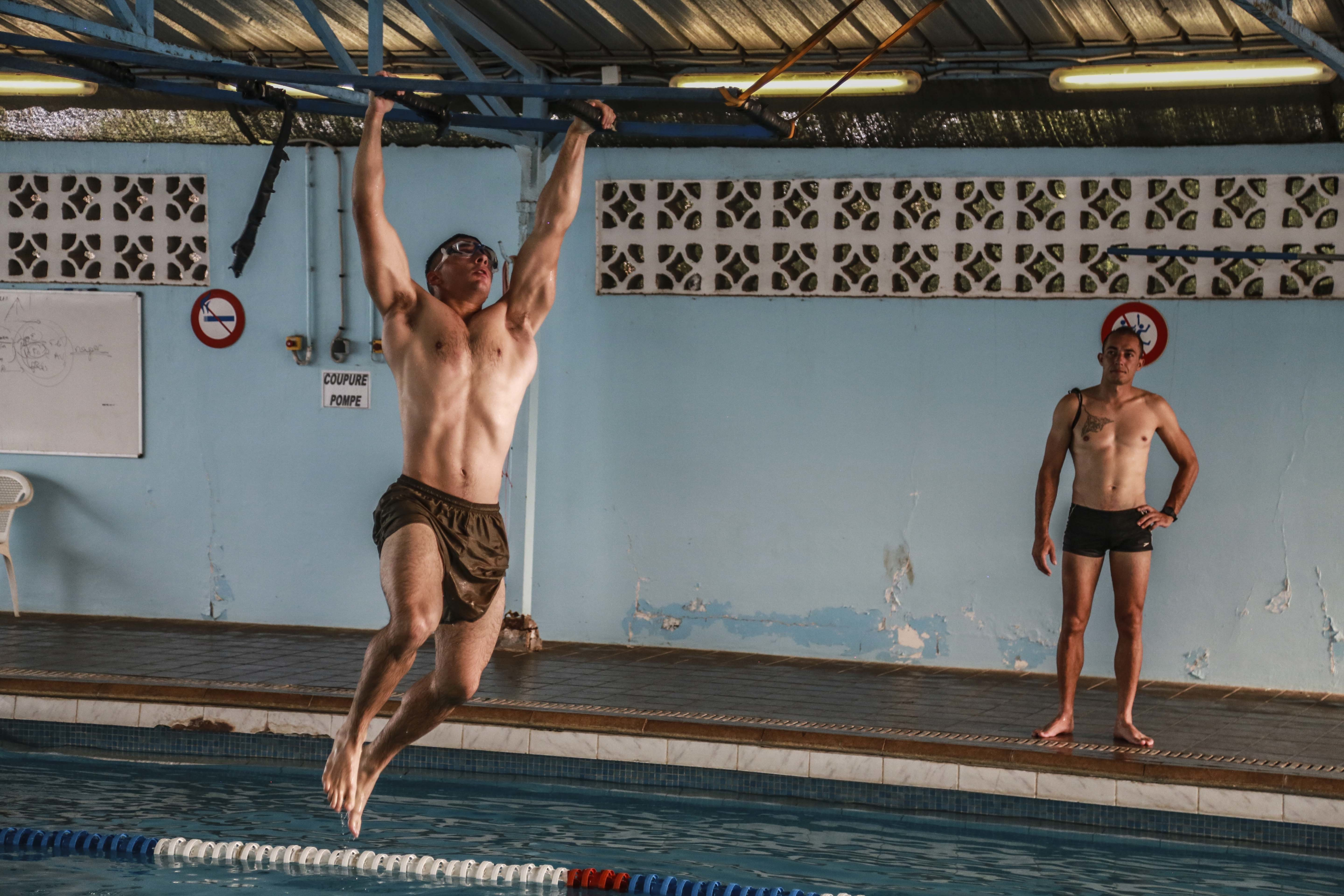
US Marines & French military training together

== See also ==
- Fitness trail
- Freerunning
- Obstacle course
- Parkour
- Ropes course

== Bibliography ==
- Angel, Julie (2016). Breaking the Jump: The Secret Story of Parkour's High-flying Rebellion. Arum Press. ISBN 978-1781315545
- Philippe-Meden, Pierre (2018) Chapter 2: Georges Hébert (1875-1957): A naturalist's invention of body ecology in Body Ecology and Emersive Leisure. Routledge. ISBN 978-1138569836 This is available as a 15-page PDF-document
- Scarth, Alwyn (2002). La Catastrophe: The Eruption of Mount Pelee, the Worst Volcanic Disaster of the 20th Century. Oxford University Press. ISBN 978-0195218398
- Andrieu, Gilbert (2012). A review article in French: Georges Hébert et l'éducation physique virile et morale par la méthode naturelle ("Georges Hébert and virile and moral physical education by the natural method"). Inflexions 2012/1 (N° 19), pp. 93 to 102.
