= Francisco Amorós y Ondeano =

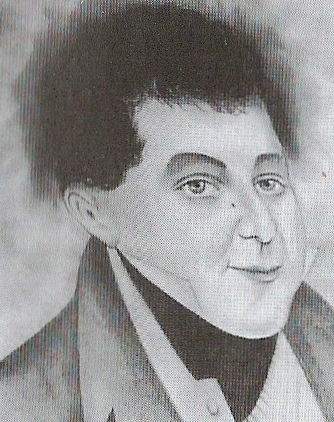
Francisco Amorós. Unterschrift Francisco Amorós (1770–1848)

Francisco Amorós y Ondeano, otherwise known as the Marquis of Sotelo (19 February 1770 – 1848), contributed to gymnastics in France and to the resurgence of sport in the modern era.

== Biography ==
Ondeano was born in Valencia, Spain, the son of a brigadier of the Spanish army. At the age of nine he studied at the San Isodoro College in Madrid. At sixteen years of age he entered the military, in the capacity of an infantry-man in the Cordoba Regiment, with which he took part in the campaigns in Oran in 1790. While in North Africa, he sustained a serious injury, the lasting physical effects of which altered his habits: from then on, he suffered from insomnia, leading him to take up reading and writing as his preferred pastimes.

By 1805, he had become a confidant (and secretary) to Manuel Godoy and played a decisive role in the establishment of the Pestalozzian Military Institute in Madrid. It was he who ultimately persuaded Godoy of the need to implement the educational method of the innovative Swiss pedagogue Johann Heinrich Pestalozzi throughout the territories of the Spanish monarchy. Amorós served as its second director from 7 August 1807, until its closure on 13 January 1808 and also introduced gymnastics into the institution’s curriculum. His reputation as an educator was such that Charles IV and Maria Luisa of Parma appointed him as tutor to the Infante Francisco de Paula in June 1807.

After the French occupation of Spain in 1808, he was one of the most prominent Afrancesados (pro-French collaborators) during the Peninsular War, receiving numerous public offices and decorations from the government of King Joseph Bonaparte: military and political governor and intendant of the Province of Santander, as well as a member of the Council of State (1808); Intendant-general of the Madrid Police and Royal commissioner for the provinces of Guipúzcoa, Álava, Vizcaya, and Burgos (1809); Knight of the Royal Order of Spain (October 25, 1809); interim minister of the General Police for the four Kingdoms of Andalusia (1810); and Royal commissioner in the territories occupied by the so-called “Army of Portugal” (1811).

In June 1813, as French troops began their withdrawal from the Peninsula, he was forced into exile. He chose to settle in Paris, the capital of the Empire, as a political refugee. Ondeano received the French nationality in 1816. He opened a gymnasium in Paris in 1817, and another in 1820, for the use of both the military and the general population.

Amongst other works, he published texts entitled:

- New Complete Manual of Physical Education for Gymnastics and Morals.
- Civil (or Civilian) French Gymnasium (of which there was an edition in print during the year 1819)

== See also ==
- Thomas Arnold
- Johann Bernhard Basedow
- William Penny Brookes
- Pierre de Coubertin
- Johann Christoph Friedrich GutsMuths
- Georges Hébert
- Pehr Henrik Ling
- Gymnastic and Sports Federation of French Patronages
