= Georges Stein =

French painter (1864–1917)

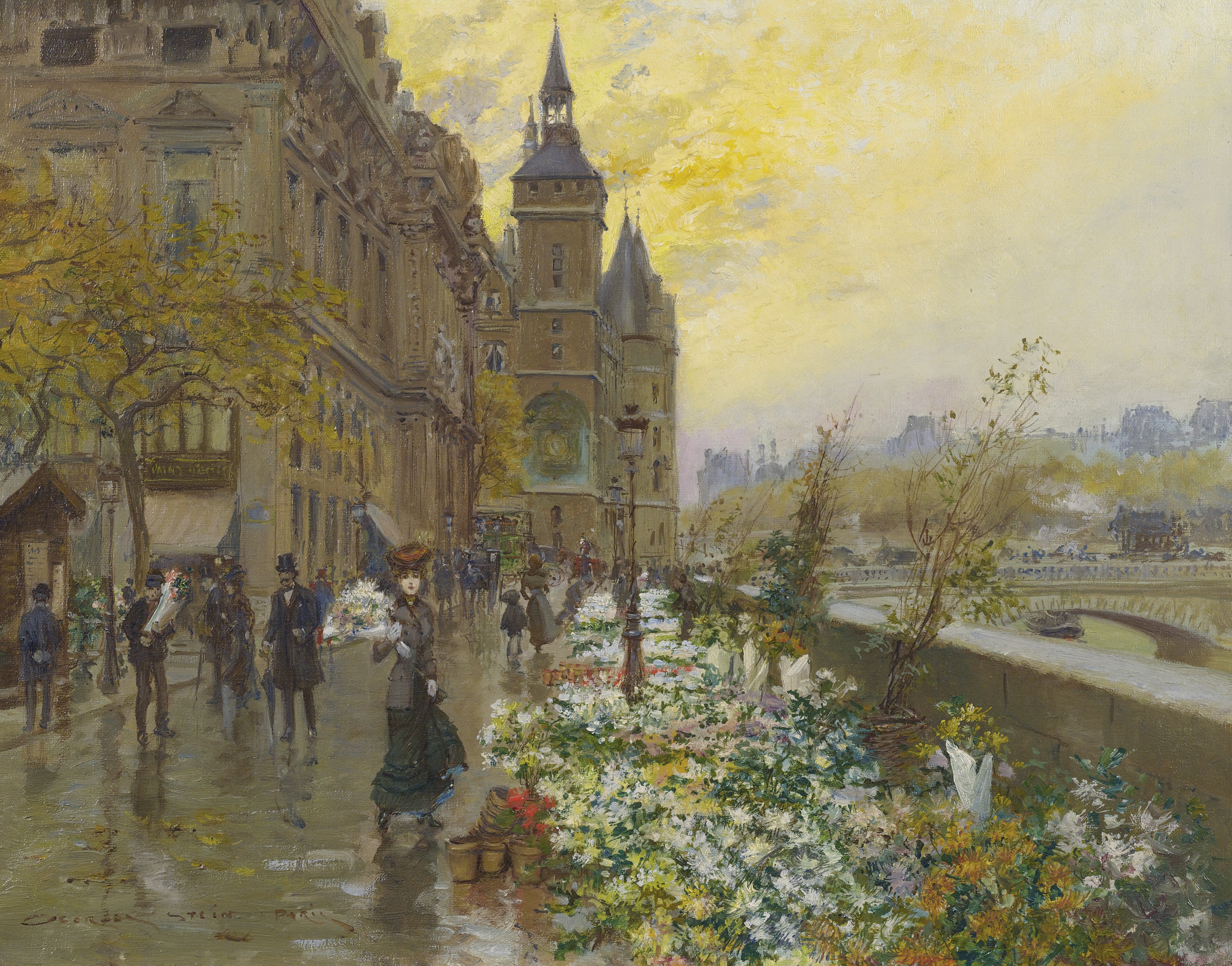
Flower Market (at the Quai de Corse in Paris)

Georges Stein, born Séverin Louis Stein (Paris, 12 February 1864 - Geneva, 1917), was a French Impressionist artist. Stein was a painter and draughtsman, and is known primarily for light-infused views of Paris and London. He also painted scenes from Melun, Vichy, Bern, Geneva, and Monte Carlo.

== Biography ==
Stein was born in Paris, the son of bookbinder Marc-Séverin and Barbe Kintziger. By 1906, he was living in Montigny-sur-Loing.

He was a member of the Société des artistes français, and exhibited at the Salon des artistes français from 1912 to 1914, during which time he lived in Melun.

He was a student of Jules Lefebvre and Gustave Boulanger.

== Style ==
Stein's works are marked by spontaneity, dynamism and movement, giving the viewer the feeling of participating in the scenes observed. Under the influence of Jean Béraud, he worked in particular on the treatment of light to translate the bustle of Parisian life. He populated his paintings with elegant women in a hurry as they went about their daily business.

In response to a commission in 1910 by Léon Roubot, director of the Élysée-Palace, Stein produced a set of four large canvases for the décor of a new casino in Vichy, which depicted carriage rides, visits to the brasseries, the casino and the racetrack.

== Salons ==
- Salon des indépendants :
  - 1906, 22nd exhibition:
    - Parisienne (effet de nuit)
    - La rue Auber au crépuscule
    - Promenade des Anglais à Nice
    - Le Quai de la Tournelle
    - Brouillard sur la Seine
    - Coin de forêt (Fontainebleau)
    - La rue de Sèvres
    - Boulevard des Italiens, pastel
- Salon des artistes français :
  - 1912, 130th official exhibition:
    - Le Pont de Westminster à Londres
  - 1913, 131st official exhibition:
    - La route de Turin à Nice, aquarelle
    - Crépuscule parisien, aquarelle rehaussée
  - 1914, 132nd official exhibition:
    - Soleil d'hiver à Nice
    - Dans la forêt de Fontainebleau
    - Sur le pont des Saints-Pères - crépuscule, aquarelle rehaussée
    - Crépuscule d'hiver, aquarelle rehaussée

== Exhibitions ==
- Exhibition of the Société des Arts de Seine-et-Marne, 1914, 8th exhibition.
- "Échappées bucoliques", Médiathèque Valery Larbaud, Vichy, 2009 :
  - L'arrivée des calèches et Fête des Fleurs devant la source des Célestins à Vichy, oil on canvas, 130 x 195 cm, private collection.

== Works in public collections ==
- Paris, musée Carnavalet :
  - Cavaliers et attelages, avenue du Bois, oil on canvas, 80 x 58 cm;
  - Grands magasins du Pont-Neuf, Paris, Jouets, Étrennes 1899, poster, 131 x 94 cm.
- Melun, Musée d'Art et d'Histoire :
  - Le Marché aux fleurs à Paris;
  - La Place de l'Opéra le soir, pastel;
  - Three paintings relating to the Jeanne d'Arc bridge (a.k.a. pont aux Fruits):
    - Vue de la Seine depuis la promenade de Vaux, oil on canvas;
    - Le Pont aux Fruits le soir, oil on canvas (dedicated « À Monsieur Émile Gaulard, bien affectueusement. G. Stein » and signed « SEVER LUD GEORGES STEIN. MELUN »);
    - Le Pont de Melun, oil on canvas.

== Conflict of sources ==
Sources conflict over Stein's dates of birth and death. The Benezit Dictionary of Artists gives the year of birth as "c. 1870". The auction house Christie's, among others, gives the dates 1855–1930. The French National Library now gives the dates 1864–1917.

There is some ambiguity on the web over Stein's gender; some gallery websites describe him as a female painter.

== Sources ==
- Gérald Schurr, Les Petits Maîtres de la peinture (1820-1920), Paris, Éditions de l'Amateur.
- Jean-Paul Crespelle, Les Maîtres de la Belle Époque, Paris, Éditions Hachette, 1966
- Aleksa Čelebonović, Peinture kitsch ou réalisme bourgeois : L'art pompier dans le monde, Paris, Seghers, 1974.
