= Georges Anderla =

Czech-born French economist

Georges Anderla (March 27, 1921 in Prague - April 26, 2005 in Antibes) was a Czech-born French economist, who served as a professor at the Paris Institute of Political Studies and the University of Paris, Sorbonne. While working for the OECD in 1973, he created a statistical model of the accumulation of human knowledge. He began by defining the known technology in 1 AD as a unit and showed that it had doubled in 1500, doubled again in 1750 and again in 1900. According to Anderla the next doubling only took fifty years, then ten, seven and finally six leading up to the year 1973. If Anderla is correct, the amount of human knowledge in 1973 was 128 times greater than in the year 1 AD.
