= Georges William Thornley =

French painter

Georges William Thornley (2 May 1857 – 31 August 1935) was a French painter and printmaker.

== Life ==
A student of the French landscape painter Eugène Cicéri and Edmond Yon, Thornley became a successful artist remembered for his seascapes from Normandy and his landscapes from the French and Italian Rivieras. He was the son of a Welsh immigrant Morgan Thornley.

He also was a watercolorist, engraver, and lithographer. His lithographs after the works of Corot, Pissarro, Degas and Puvis de Chavannes were acclaimed by his peers and awarded at the Salon de Paris.

His paintings were exhibited beginning in 1878. He won the Mention of Honor in 1881 and a Third Class medal in 1888. Thornley embraced the Impressionist movement early in his career, which brought him much success.

His style is characterised by bold brushwork and thick "impasto". This open landscape uses light and color to show an "impression of a panorama" while retaining a naturalistic character.
