= Georges Philippe =

Georges Philippe may refer to:

- Georges Philippe (chess player) (1935–2010), Luxembourgian chess player
- Philippe de Rothschild (1902–1988), member of the Rothschild banking dynasty
