= Georges Briard =

American designer

Georges Briard (May 17, 1917 – July 30, 2005 New York) was the professional name of Jascha Brojdo (born Jakub Brojdo), an American designer in the 1950s, 1960s, and 1970s. He is most well known for his signature dishware and glassware – everything from cups and plates to gold plated serving dishes. His signature collection was stocked at noted department stores, such as Neiman Marcus and Bonwit Teller.

== Biography ==
Born Jakub Brojdo in Ekaterinoslav, he emigrated to Chicago from Poland in 1937 in advance of the German invasion of Poland because, as a Jew, his life would have been in danger under the Nazi incursion. Once in the United states he adopted the name Jascha Brojdo. He studied at the Art Institute of Chicago where he earned his MFA, while living in Oak Park with his physician uncle Aaron Broyde. He served in the U.S. Army throughout World War II as a multi-lingual Russian and Polish interpreter on General George S. Patton's staff.

In 1947, Brojdo was discharged from the Army and started working in New York with Max Wille, whom he had met in art school. Wille was a subcontractor to Milton Klein's Jaxton Manufacturing Corp., which crafted hand-made wooden serving pieces and gift ware. Milton Klein designed many of these items himself (they are marked "a Klein design" on the bottom), and as his line expanded to include walnut wood cheese boards, he added inset glass and ceramic tiles as cheese-cutting surfaces. These parts were contracted out to other artists whose designs were compatible with his own style, and these sub-contractors included Max Wille. Brojdo began painting metal serving trays for Wille and evidently Wille came up with the name "Georges Briard" to mark Brojdo's commercial pieces.

Brodjo was also a painter and he used his real name on his art, but "Georges Briard" became his signature as a designer of commercial glass, ceramic, and metal articles. His mid century modern bar ware, kitchen ware, and gift ware often featured bright, gem-like blues and purples, accented with lavish overlays of 22 karat gold. Some of his designs were abstract or loosely geometrical, while others featured cheerful folk-art influenced images taken from nature, such as butterflies, birds, flowers, fruit, and leaves.

His softly square serving trays in clear or white glass with floral centers and formal borders in gold were both starkly modernistic and hauntingly evocative of the square shawls worn by European Jewish women before the war; he also produced a similar line of glass trays in rectangular form with paisley patterns based on Indian sari fabrics. His modernistic bar ware, featuring clear, bright blue, purple, or red designs overlaid with luxe gold, echoed medieval European stained glass, but was presented in a wittily, light-hearted, abstract and modern way. His later ceramic pieces in bright pop-art colours, while not as high-end as his glass designs, also found a wide market. Produced first by M. Wille Company, then marketed by Milton Klein's Jaxton Manufacturing, and later in a partnership with Philip Stetson, the "Georges Briard" line was always sold in elite shops, including the flagship Neiman-Marcus store in Dallas, Texas, and Bonwit Teller in New York City. Because each piece is signed, these popular luxury goods from the 1950s through the 1970s are highly sought after in the 21st century antiques trade.

In 2004, Jascha Brojdo was awarded the Frank S. Child Lifetime Achievement Award by The Society of Glass and Ceramic Decorators, in honor of his extraordinary contributions to the glass and ceramic decorating industry.

Brojdo was preceded in death by his Polish-born wife, Bronya Marks Brojdo (1905-1995). He died in New York City at the age of 88. Husband and wife were interred side by side in Shalom Memorial Park, Arlington Heights, Illinois.

Brojdo was also a collector. Estate lots at auction after his death included works by Jean Dubuffet, Alexej von Jawlensky, Paul Klee, Franz Kline, Fernand Leger, Henry Moore and Pablo Picasso.

== Sources ==
- Brojdo, Jascha (New York Times death notice), Aug. 23, 2005.
- Leslie Pina, Designed and Signed, Schiffer Publishing, 1996; contains a biographical introduction with a retrospective catalogue of 284 signature Briard designs.
