= Georges Raeders =

Georges Raeders (1896, Saint-Nazaire, France - 1980, São Paulo, Brazil) was a Brazilian writer. He graduated from the Pontifical Catholic University of São Paulo. In 1962, he won the Prix de la langue française from the Académie française for Bibliographie franco-brésilienne.
