= Georges Vanier (disambiguation) =

Georges Vanier (1888–1967) was a Canadian soldier and former Governor General of Canada.

Georges Vanier may also refer to:

- École secondaire Georges-P.-Vanier, a high school in Hamilton, Ontario
- École secondaire Georges-Vanier in Laval, Quebec
- Georges P. Vanier Junior High School in Fall River, Nova Scotia
- Georges P. Vanier Secondary School in Courtenay, British Columbia
- General Vanier Elementary School in Winnipeg, Manitoba
- General Vanier Intermediate School in Cornwall, Ontario
- Georges Vanier Catholic School, an elementary school in Ottawa, Ontario
- Georges Vanier Elementary School in Surrey, British Columbia
- Georges Vanier Secondary School in Toronto, Ontario
- Georges-Vanier (Montreal Metro), metro station in Montreal, Quebec
