= Georges Hector =

Haitian painter

Georges Paul Hector (1938–1990) was a Haitian painter. Born in the small rural town of Petite Rivière de l'Artibonite, Hector specialized in landscapes and murals. His works were exhibited in the Caribbean, the United States, and Senegal. Hector also served as General Secretary of the National Association of Haitian Artists (ANAH). He was married to Marie Solange Pierre at Saint Bernadette Church.

After his divorce, Georges Paul married Hope Marie Webley (teacher, aged 21) in the parish of St Andrew, Jamaica on 18 November 1973. Their daughter Paula Hector was born in Jamaica (December 1972).
