= Lucien Lecointe =

French politician

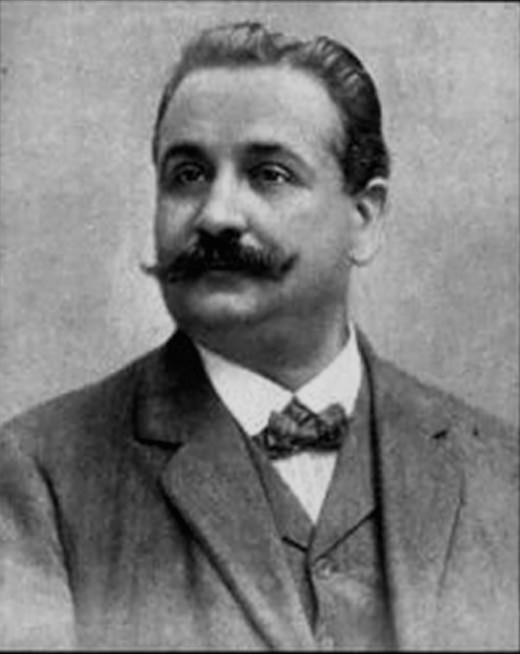
- Born: 14 April 1867; Amiens, Somme, France
- Died: 22 June 1940 (aged 73); Mirebeau, Haute-Vienne, France
- Occupation: Politician
- Political party: SFIO

Lucien Lecointe (14 April 1867 – 22 June 1940) was a French politician. He served as a member of the Chamber of Deputies from 1909 to 1919, 1924 to 1928, and 1932 to 1936, representing Somme. He was also the mayor of Amiens from 1925 to 1940.
