= Georges Vereeken =

- Born: 1896; Ghent, Belgium
- Died: 1978 (aged 81–82); Brussels, Belgium
- Occupation: Politician

Georges Vereeken was a Belgian socialist. He was born in Ghent, Belgium in 1896 and died in Brussels in 1978. He was a taxi driver by trade. From 1925, he was a member of the Central Committee of the Parti Communiste de Belgique (PCB), but he was active in Brussels in the Belgian Section of the International Left Opposition (ILO) and its successor, the International Communist League (ICL) during 1928–1935. He broke with the official Trotskyist movement to lead the Groupe Spartakus from 1935 to 1937, then re-joining the Parti Socialiste Révolutionnaire (PSR), of which he was the Secretary from 1937 to 1938. He broke with the official Trotskyists again in 1938, editing Contre le Courant from 1938 to 1945. Later, he was involved in the Tendance Marxiste Révolutionnaire (TMR) from 1964 to 1978.

He was closely allied to Dutch socialist Henk Sneevliet and to the Workers' Party of Marxist Unification (POUM) in Spain.
