= Georges Lecointe =

Georges Lecointe may refer to:

- Georges Lecointe (explorer) (1869–1929), Belgian naval officer and explorer
- Georges Lecointe (rower) (1897–1932), French rower
