= Georges Demenÿ =

French photographer

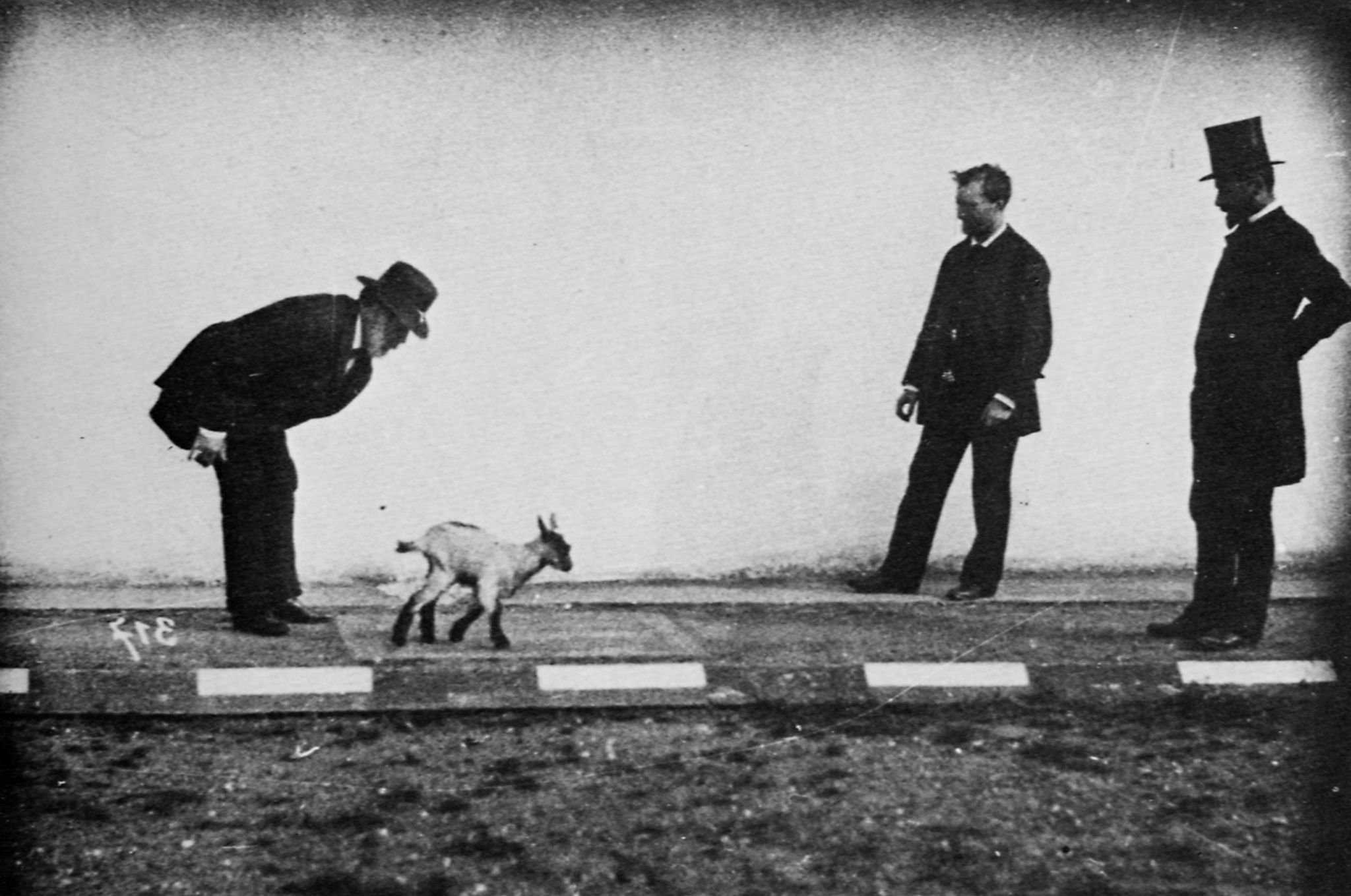
- Born: 12 June 1850; Douai
- Died: 26 October 1917 (aged 67); Paris
- Occupations: Photographer, inventor, physiologist

Georges Demenÿ (12 June 1850 in Douai – 26 October 1917 in Paris) was a French inventor, chronophotographer, filmmaker, gymnast and physical fitness enthusiast.

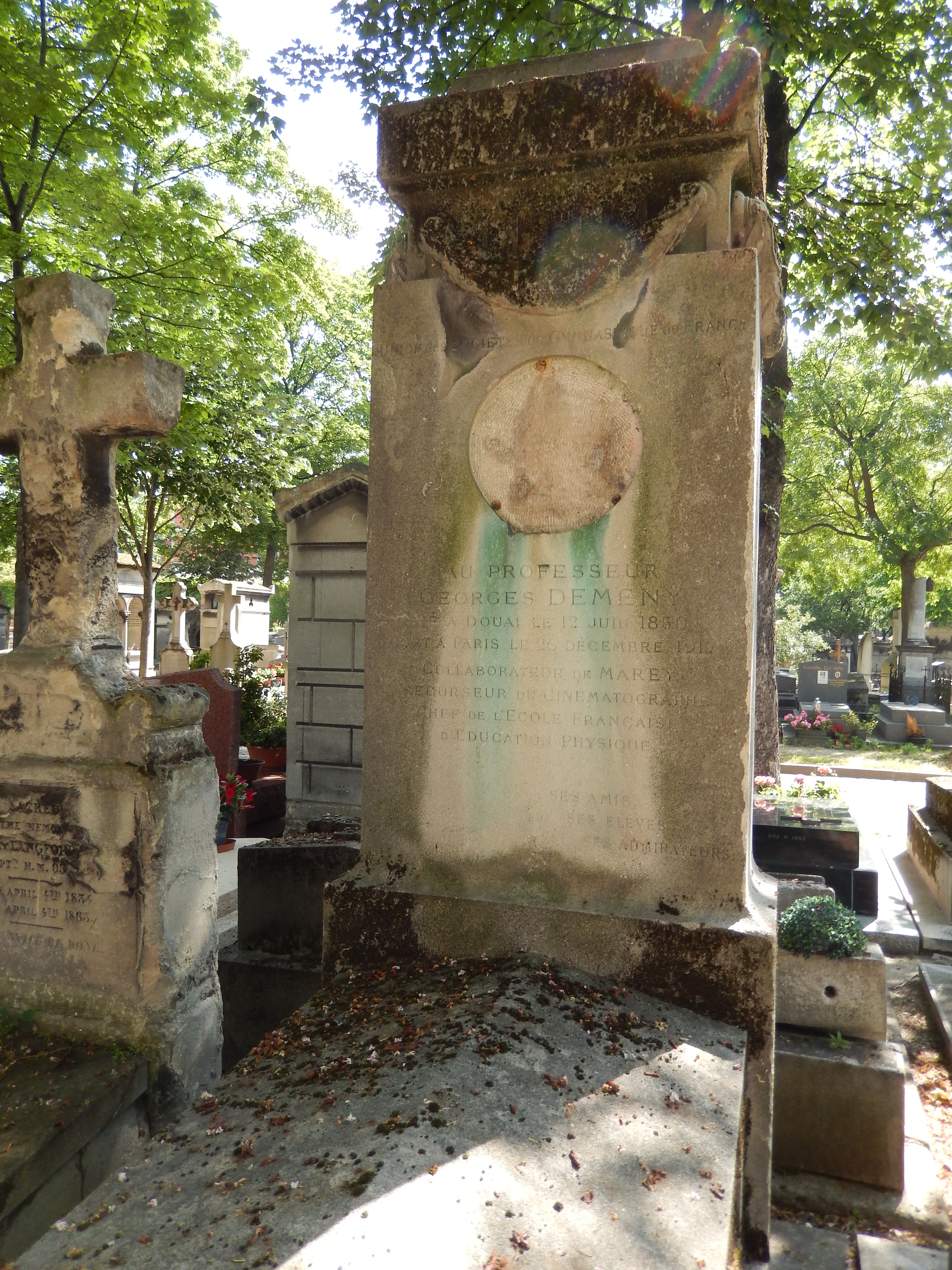
Georges Demenÿ's grave at Montmartre Cemetery

== Main publications ==
- L’Éducation physique en Suède, Paris, Société d'éditions scientifiques, 1892
- Guide du maître chargé de l'enseignement des exercices physiques dans les écoles publiques et privées, Paris, Société d'éditions scientifiques, 1900
- Les Bases scientifiques de l’éducation physique, Paris, Félix Alcan, 1902
- Physiologie des professions. Le violoniste, art, mécanisme, hygiène, Paris, A. Maloine, 1905
- Cours supérieur d'éducation physique, avec Jean Philippe et Georges-Auguste Racine, Paris, Félix Alcan, 1905
- Mécanisme et éducation des mouvements, Paris, Félix Alcan, 1904; 1905
- Danses gymnastiques composées pour les établissements d'enseignement primaire et secondaire de jeunes filles, avec A. Sandoz, 1908
- Les Origines du cinématographe, Paris, H. Paulin, 1909
- Science et art du mouvement. Éducation physique de la jeune fille. Éducation et harmonie des mouvements, Paris, Librairie des annales, 1911; 1920
- L’Éducation de l’effort, Paris, Félix Alcan, 1914 Texte en ligne
- Éducation physique des adolescents. Préparation sportive par la méthode synthétique avec l'art de travailler, Paris, Félix Alcan, 1917
