= Eyquem =

Eyquem (French pronunciation: [ekɛm]) is a French surname. Notable people with this surname include:

- Gilles Eyquem (born 1959), French footballer
- Marie-Thérèse Eyquem (1913–1978), French sportswoman, politician, and feminist
- Michel Eyquem de Montaigne (1533–1592), French philosopher
