= Sport in France =

Sport in France plays an important role in French society, which is reflected in its popularity among the French people and the nation's strong sporting history. Various types of sports are played and followed in France, notably cycling, fencing, football, and handball, which has earned France eight victories in world championships and five Olympic medal; France is also the four-time European champion of handball.

== History ==
France has a long history of sport and wide participation, as well as active support from the media and the government.

The origins of French sport reach back to ancient Gaul, where Celtic tribes engaged in activities like chariot racing, wrestling, and equestrian sports, often influenced by Roman traditions. The medieval era saw the rise of chivalric tournaments—jousting and martial arts that blended athleticism with social spectacle, reflecting the values and hierarchy of feudal society.

During the Renaissance, sports such as tennis and jeu de paume (the precursor to modern tennis) flourished among the aristocracy. These activities were closely linked to the royal court and symbolized status and refinement, reinforcing social stratification and the association of certain sports with the elite.

The French Revolution of the 1790s brought a new vision for sport, emphasizing physical education as a means to foster healthy, disciplined citizens aligned with republican ideals. This period saw the reinterpretation of traditional sports and the emergence of new forms of physical training, reflecting broader societal changes and the drive for egalitarianism.

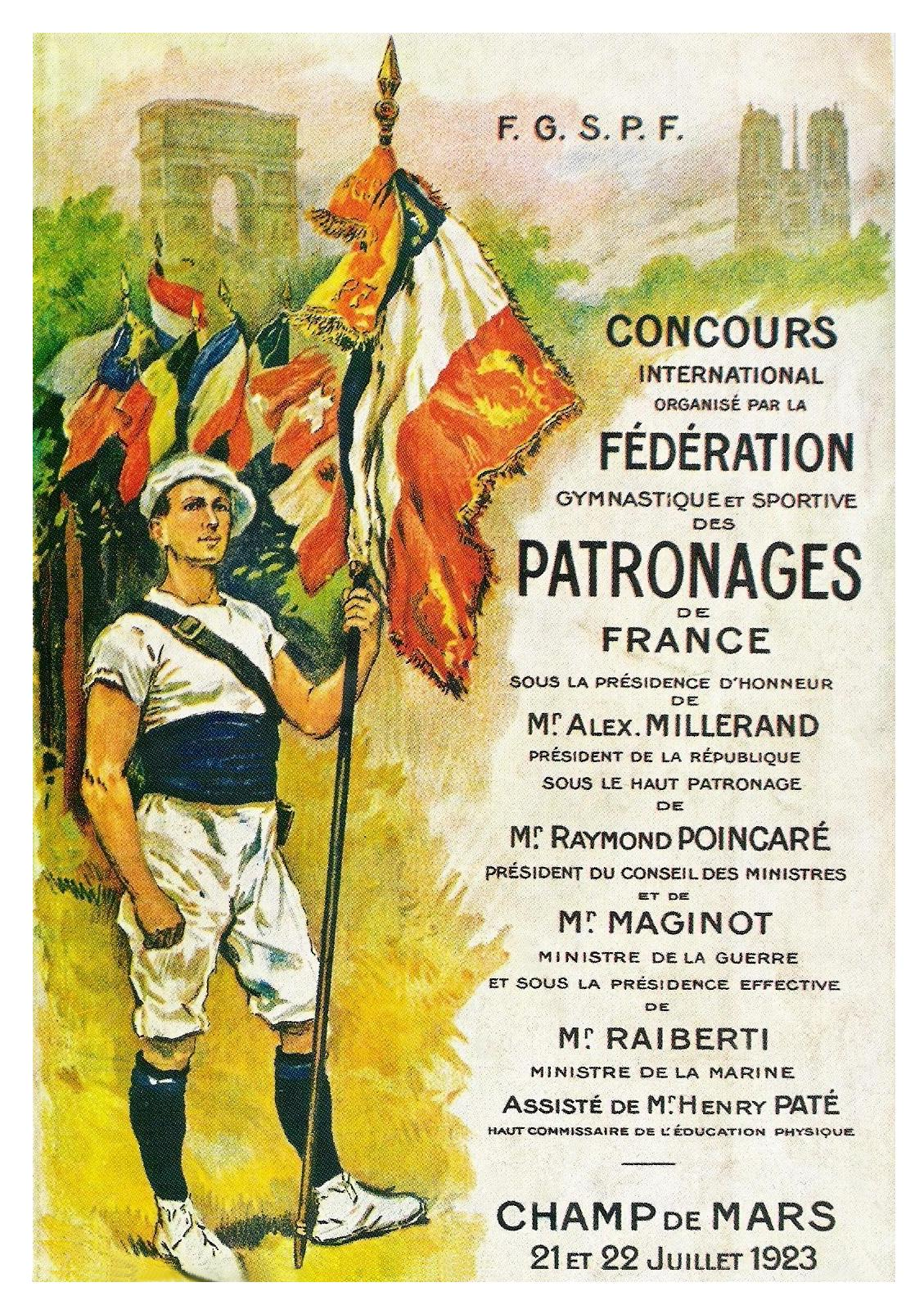
Gymnastic and Sports Federation of French Patronages, 1923

The late 19th and early 20th centuries marked the formal organization of sport in France. Pierre de Coubertin was co-founder of the International Olympic Committee (IOC) in 1894, becoming the father of the modern Olympics. National sports federations were formed to regulate and promote various disciplines, such as Gymnastic and Sports Federation of French Patronages. This period also saw the spread of sports through the French colonial empire, where physical education and organized sport were used as tools of cultural assimilation and imperial influence.

From the mid-20th century, sport became a matter of national concern and soft power in international affairs. The government invested in sports infrastructure, youth academies, and athlete development as a means to foster national unity, assimilate immigrants, and project international prestige. Football, in particular, became a symbol of multicultural integration, especially after the national team’s 1998 World Cup victory, which celebrated a multiethnic roster as a model of French identity and social cohesion.

The 20th century saw the democratization of sport, with football, rugby, cycling (notably the Tour de France), and tennis becoming central to French popular culture. These sports not only provided entertainment and national pride but also served as arenas for debates about class, gender, and regional identity.

Sport in France has often intersected with politics and social movements. For example, the May 1968 protests influenced the state’s approach to youth and sport, while issues of racism, immigration, and national identity have played out in the public sphere through high-profile sporting events and controversies involving national teams.

France has frequently hosted major international sporting events, including multiple Olympic Games, the FIFA World Cup, and the Rugby World Cup. They will host the FIBA Basketball World Cup in 2031. These occasions have reinforced France’s role as a global sporting nation and showcased its capacity for international leadership and cultural diplomacy.

== Main team sports ==
=== Football ===
Football (soccer) is the most popular sport in France, with 1,993,270 licensed players in the leagues. The sport was imported from England at the end of the 19th century, under the name of association football. In its early days, the sport gained followers mainly in the Paris area and the Northern part of the country - Nord-Pas-de-Calais and Normandy were the first teams that were created outside Paris. However, in southern France, football's competitor, rugby football, was more popular for a period of time. Established in 1919 from competing organizations, the Fédération française de football consists of 18,000 teams.

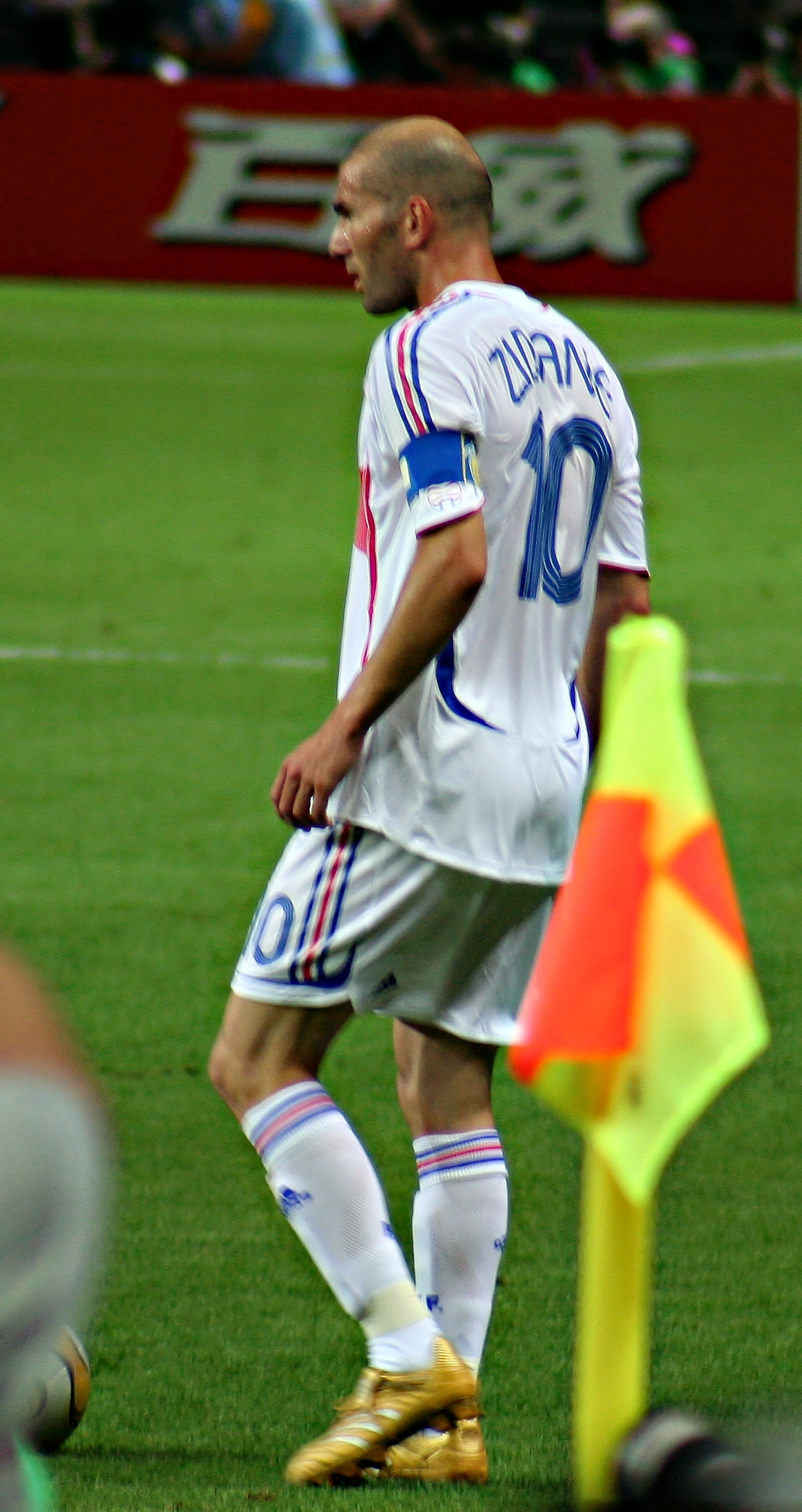
Zinedine Zidane, a renowned French footballer.

France is also one of only ten teams to have won the UEFA European Championship (1984 and 2000). They also finished as runners-up when they hosted the tournament in 2016. France was also the 1984 Olympic Champion and the 1998 and 2018 FIFA World Cup winner, hosting the 1998 tournament. They finished as World Cup runners-up in 2006 and 2022.

Ligue 1 is the French professional league for association football clubs. It is the country's primary football competition and serves as the top division of the French football league system. Contested by 18 clubs, it operates on a system of promotion and relegation with Ligue 2. The most successful club in the French first division history is Paris Saint-Germain with 13 championships, followed by AS Saint-Étienne with 10, Olympique de Marseille with 9 titles and FC Nantes with 8 titles. As of 2025, the current champions are Paris Saint-Germain.

The Coupe de France is the premier knock-out cup competition in French football. The Coupe de la Ligue is the second major cup competition in France. The Trophée des Champions is played each July as a one-off match between the Coupe de France winners and the Ligue 1 champions.

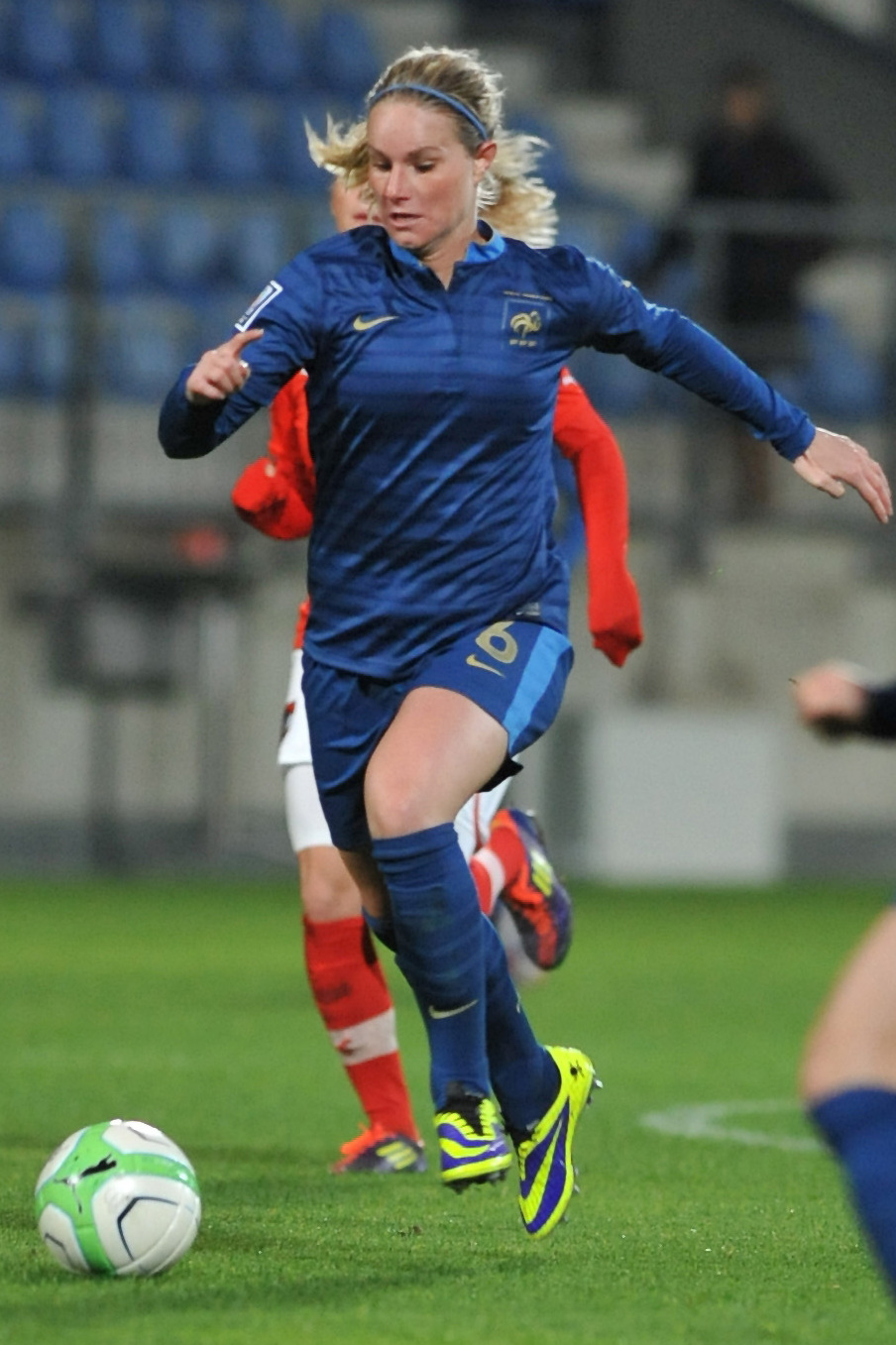
Amandine Henry footballer, captain of the France national team.

Only two French clubs have won the UEFA Champions League: Marseille in 1993 and Paris Saint-Germain in 2025 and 2026; furthermore, by winning the FIFA Intercontinental Cup, it became the first French club to be crowned Club World Champion in 2025.

Stade de Reims (1956, 1959 but winner of the Latin Cup in 1953), Saint-Étienne (1976), and AS Monaco (2004) have also been runners-up.

SC Bastia (1978), FC Girondins de Bordeaux (1996) and Olympique de Marseille (1999, 2004, 2018) have been runners-up in the UEFA Europa League. Paris Saint-Germain won the now defunct UEFA Cup Winners' Cup in 1996.

The France women's national football team's main international achievement has been fourth place at the 2011 FIFA Women's World Cup. They also hosted the 2019 Women's World Cup.

Women's national professional competitions are supervised by the Fédération française de football. The first division is the Première Ligue. Olympique Lyonnais is the most successful team in French first division history with 31 national titles, including a streak of fourteen consecutive league titles from 2007 to 2020. In the UEFA Women's Champions League, OL have won a record eight titles (2011, 2012, 2016, 2017, 2018, 2019, 2020 and 2022) and have been runners-up four times (2010, 2013, 2024 and 2026).

=== Basketball ===
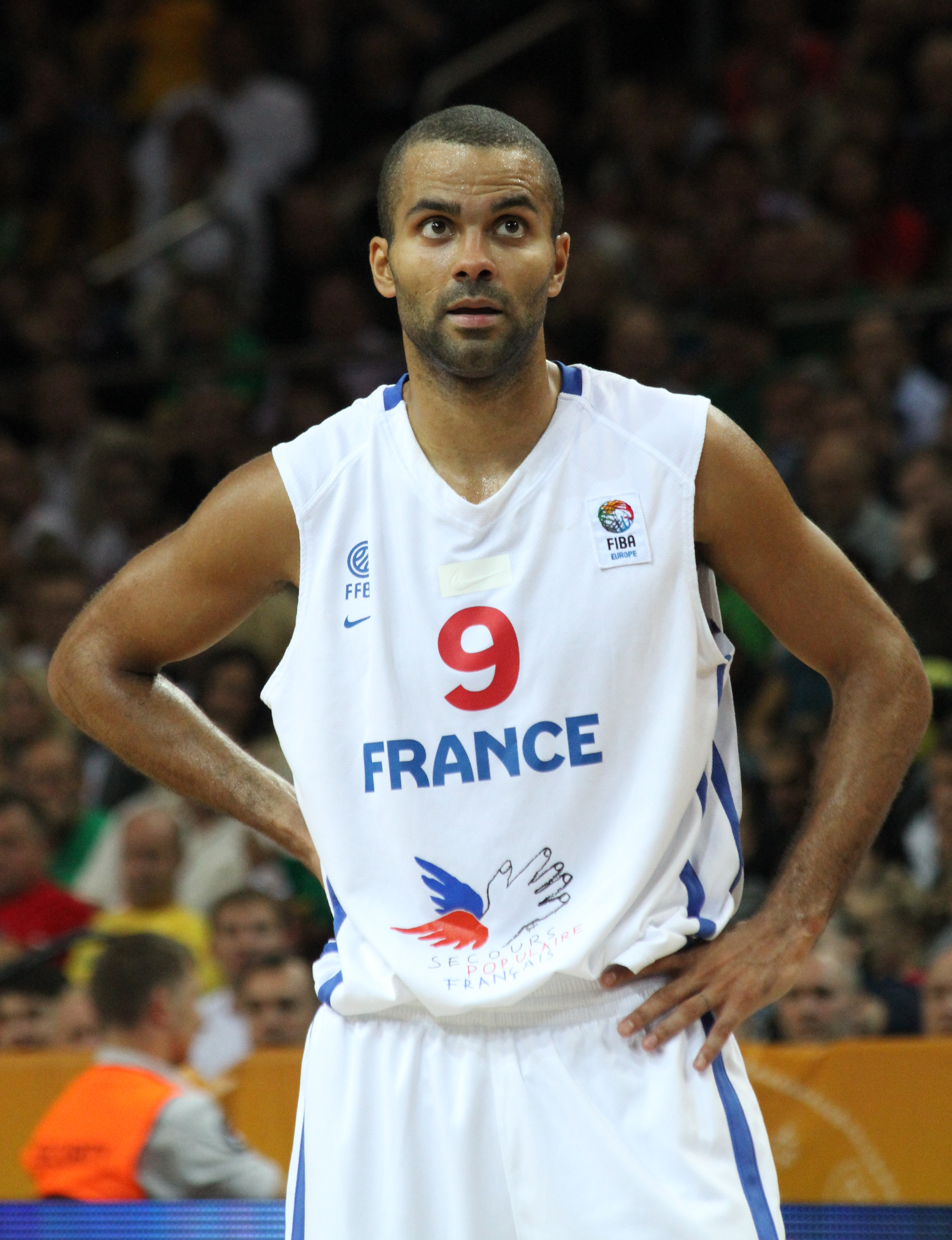
Tony Parker has drawn attention to French basketball

The France national basketball team has had good results in international competitions over the years, with the senior team winning their first title ever at the EuroBasket 2013. The team was runner-up at the 1948 Summer Olympics, EuroBasket 1949, the 2000 Summer Olympics, the EuroBasket 2011, the 2020 Summer Olympics and the 2024 Summer Olympics. France has also won medals at the FIBA World Cup in 2014, and 2019.

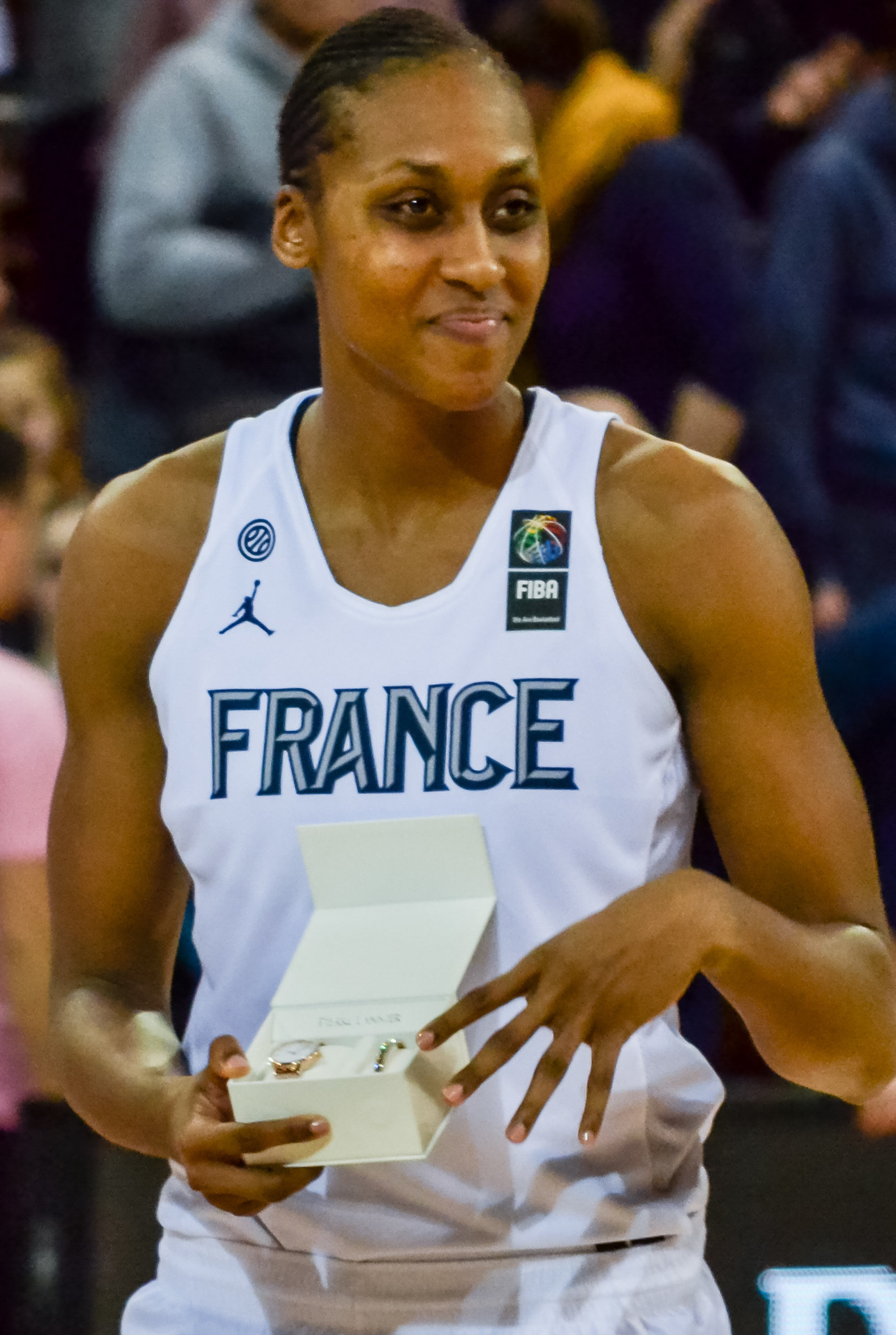
Sandrine Gruda basketball player, multiple European Championship medals.

As of the 2015–16 season, 22 French citizens have played in the NBA in the USA and Canada. San Antonio Spurs point guard Tony Parker won four NBA titles to his credit; Spurs forward Boris Diaw once; Utah Jazz center Rudy Gobert, who won back-to-back NBA Defensive Player of the Year awards in 2018 and 2019; and New York Knicks forward-center Joakim Noah, also notable for his college career at the University of Florida in which he starred on a team that won two NCAA titles with the same starting lineup. The New York Knicks former GM Phil Jackson selected Frank Ntilikina in the 2016-2017 NBA Draft. Victor Wembanyama won NBA Rookie of the Year in 2024. Men's national professional competitions are supervised by the Ligue Nationale de Basketball. There are two divisions: Pro A (first division) and Pro B (second division). ASVEL Lyon-Villeurbanne is the most successful team in French first division history with 17 titles from 1949 to 2009. Limoges CSP is the only French team to have won the EuroLeague in 1993.

The France women's national basketball team has twice been European champion (2001 and 2009), and also claimed a silver medal at the 2012 Summer Olympics.

Women's national professional competitions are supervised by the Fédération Française de Basket-Ball with the first division being the Ligue féminine de basket. Clermont Université Club is the most successful team in French first division history with 13 titles from 1968 to 1981. CJM Bourges (1997, 1998, and 2001) and US Valenciennes (2002 and 2004) have won the EuroLeague Women.

Besides regular basketball, 3x3 basketball has become increasingly popular in France.

=== Handball ===
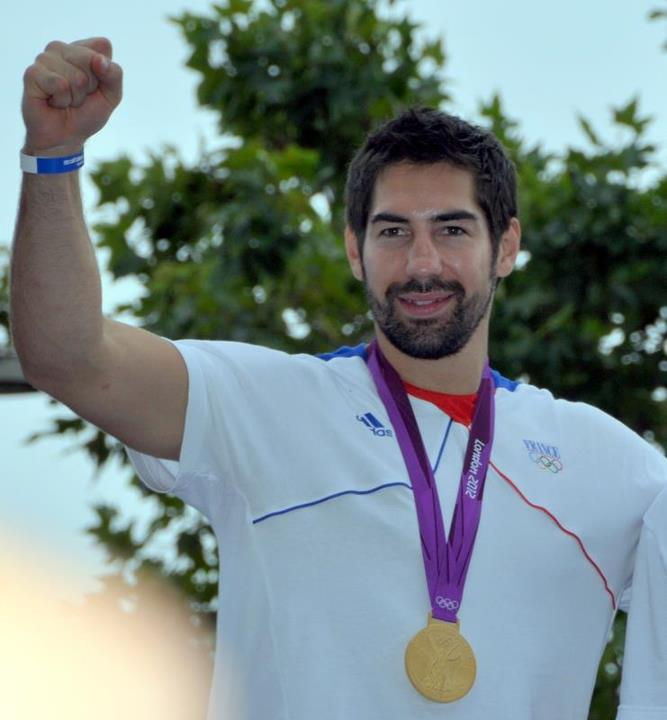
Nikola Karabatic is 4-times World champion, 3-times Olympic champion, and 4-times European champion.

There were 492,101 licensed handball players in France as of 2019.

The France men's national handball team is the first handball team to have held all three titles twice (the Danish women's team also held all three in 1997), and the only national team in its sport to hold six world titles and a total of thirteen medals at the World Men's Handball Championship. With a total of five medals, including three gold in 2008, 2012 and 2021, France is also the most successful handball team at the Summer Olympics. France was also recognized as the European champion of handball in 2006, 2010, 2014 and 2024.

The France women's national handball team, although less successful, won the Summer Olympics once (2020), the World Championship thrice (2003, 2017, 2023) and also the European Championship once (2018).

=== Rugby union ===
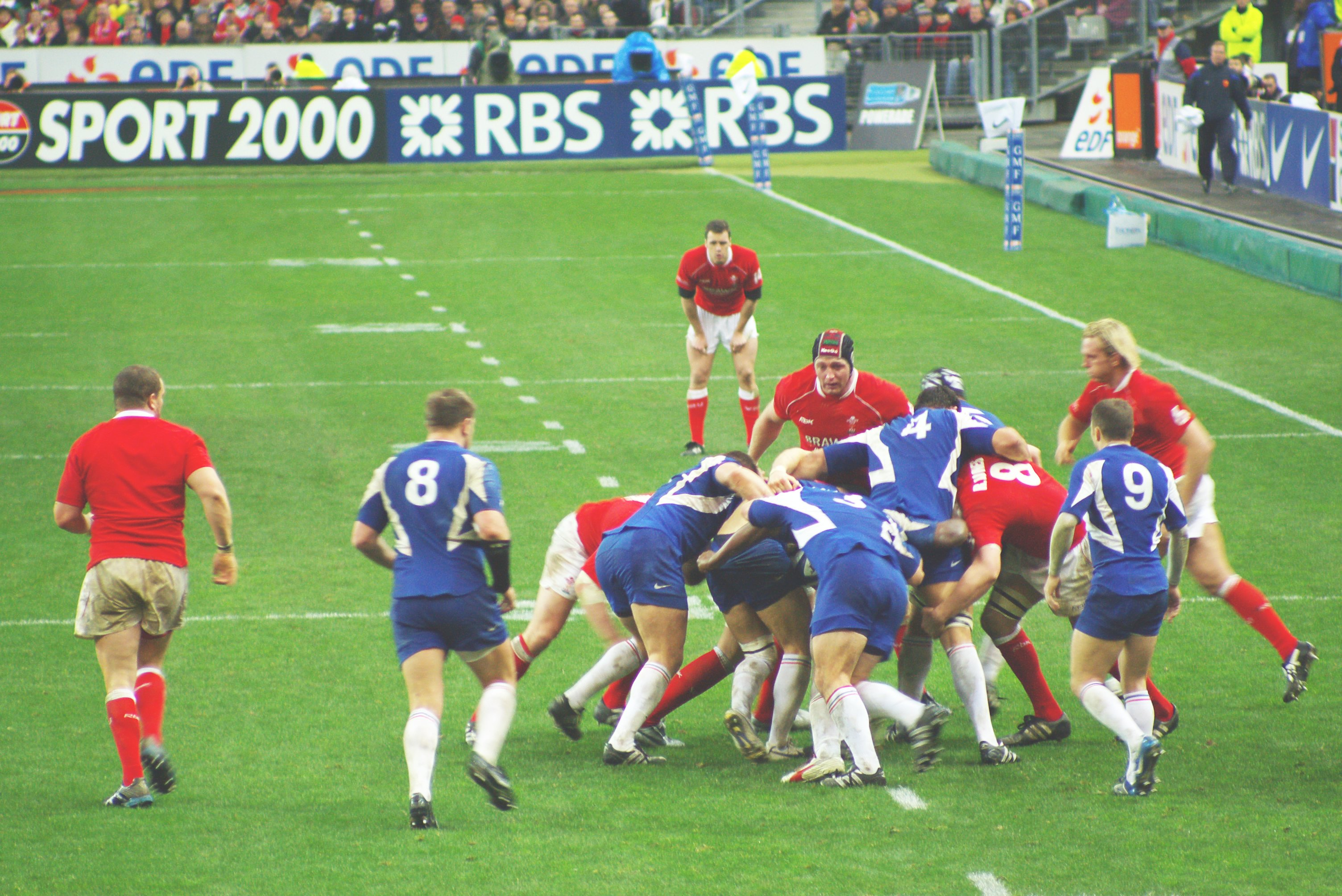
France playing Wales during the 2007 Six Nations Championship.

Rugby union (rugby à 15 or jeu à 15) was first introduced in the early 1870s by British residents. While football is much more popular nationally, rugby union is predominant in the southern half of the country, especially around Toulouse, the French Basque country and Catalonia. Elite French clubs participate in the domestic club competition - the Top 14. Clubs also compete in the European knock-out competitions, the European Rugby Champions Cup and European Rugby Challenge Cup. It is the seventh largest French team sport in the terms of licensed players with 360,847 licensed players (2014). There are 1,737 clubs in France and the number of licensed players has significantly increased over the recent years (up from 260,000 in 2000).

Toulouse, Brive, Toulon, La Rochelle and Bordeaux Bègles won the Champions Cup.

In 2010, the all-French final of the Heineken Cup between Toulouse and Biarritz in the Stade de France received 3.2 million viewers on France 2. In 2011, the final of the Top 14 gathered 4.4 million viewers on France 2 and Canal+ and the World Cup final between New Zealand and France gathered 15.4 million viewers on TF1, the highest audience on French TV since the start of the year.

The national side is one of the tier 1 national teams. World number one in July 2022. It competes annually in the Six Nations Championship, and won it outright 18 times. France has been to every Rugby World Cup since its inception in 1987, and has been a runner-up on three occasions, most recently in 2011. France hosted the 2007 and 2023 Rugby World Cups.

And the France national rugby sevens team became World Series champion in 2023–24.

=== Calendar of the major men's and women's professional sports leagues in France ===
January	February	March	April	May	June	July	August	September	October	November	December
Ligue 1 (Football)							Ligue 1 (Football)				
Top 14 (Rugby Union)								Top 14 (Rugby Union)			
LNB Élite (Basketball)								LNB Élite (Basketball)			
Starligue (Handball)									Starligue (Handball)		

January	February	March	April	May	June	July	August	September	October	November	December
Première Ligue (Football)								Première Ligue (Football)			
Élite 1 (Rugby Union)										Élite 1 (Rugby Union)	
LFB(Basketball)								LFB(Basketball)			
LFH Division 1 Féminine (Handball)									LFH Division 1 Féminine (Handball)		

== Main individual sports ==
=== Cycling ===
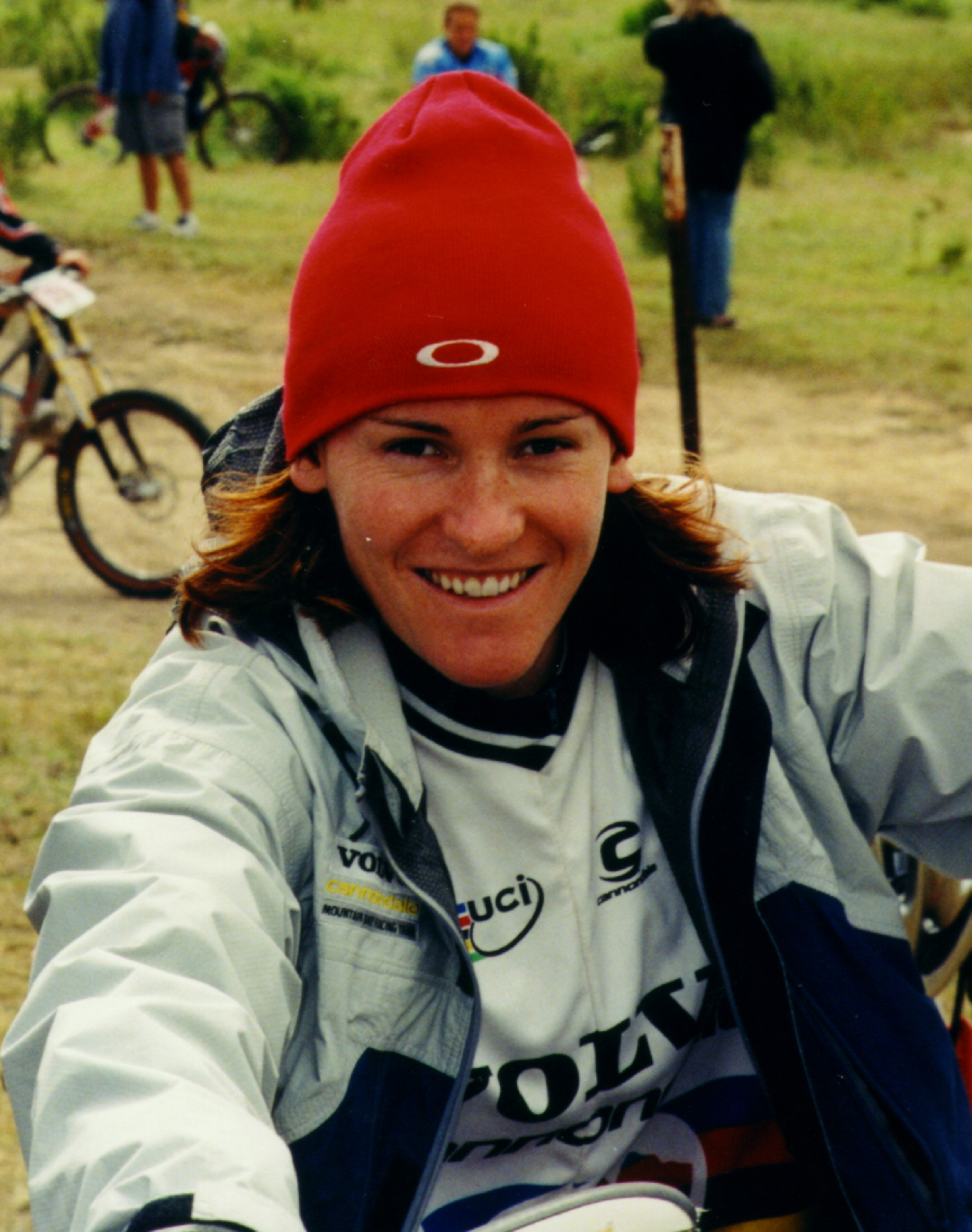
Anne-Caroline Chausson mountain biker and BMX racer, Olympic gold medalist.

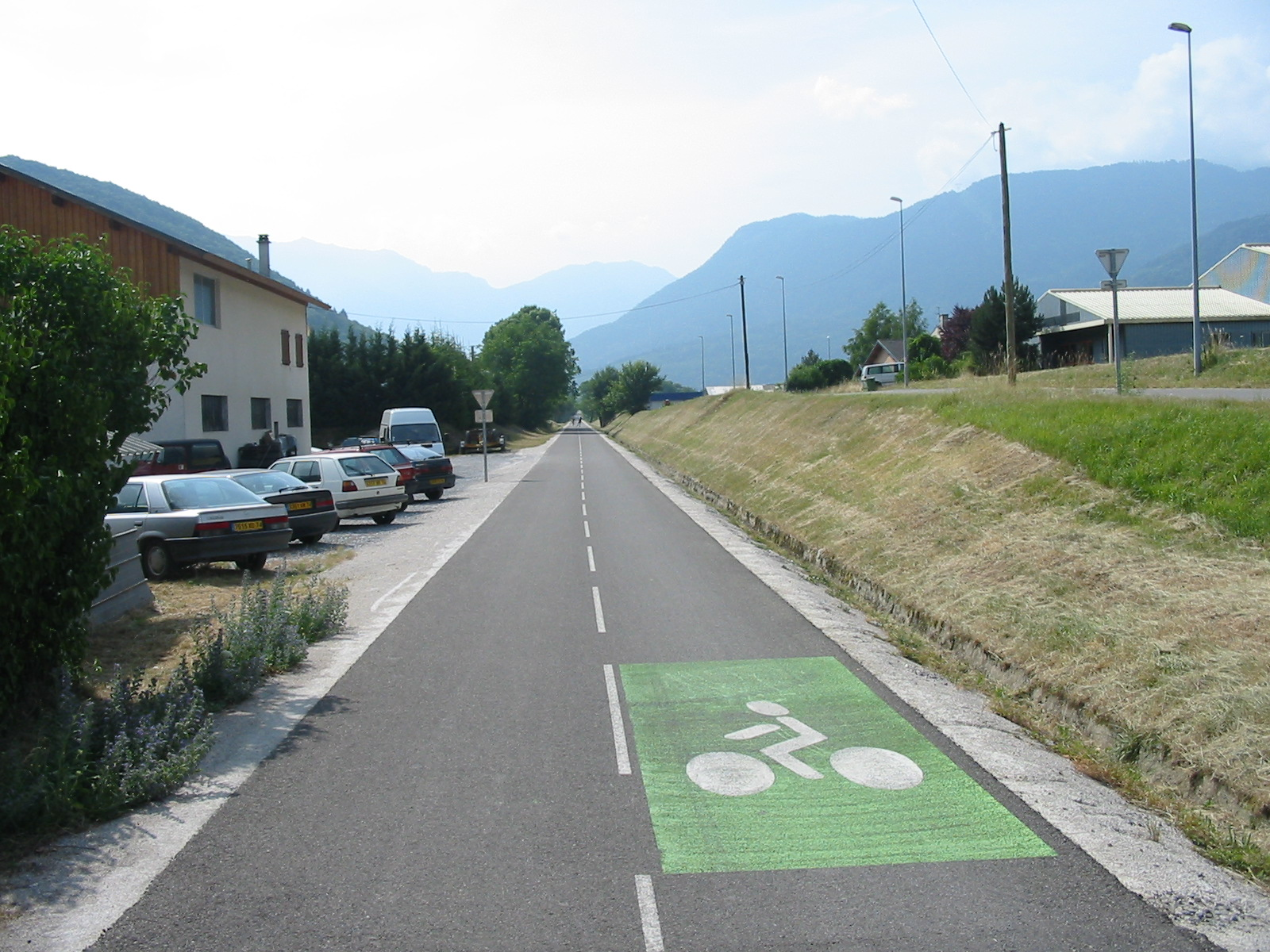
Everyday cycling infrastructure in France

France hosts "the world's biggest annual sporting event" called the Tour de France, a road cycling race, which takes place each July and lasts for three weeks. It is one of the three Grand Tours, which are the most prestigious stage races in road cycling. The Tour has been won 36 times by French cyclists in its 110-year history. Cycling is very popular in France, evident from the fact that the Tour de France race attracts more than 12 million people who travel to witness the race first hand. The Tour de France also attracts a television audience of 3.5 billion people worldwide. In addition, the north of France hosts the one-day race Paris–Roubaix, known as one of the cobbled classics famous for the use of cobblestones or setts as challenging terrain, and as one of the five "Monuments" which along with the road racing World Championship are the most important one-day classic cycle races. Other high-profile races which are included as part of the top-level UCI World Tour circuit include the stage races Paris–Nice and the Critérium du Dauphiné (often used as a warm-up race for riders competing in the Tour de France), and the one-day race GP Ouest-France.

Some of the most notable French riders are multiple Grand Tour winners Lucien Petit-Breton, André Leducq, Antonin Magne, Louison Bobet, Jacques Anquetil (along with historic contender Raymond Poulidor, who was a favorite of the crowd), Roger Pingeon, Bernard Thévenet, Bernard Hinault and Laurent Fignon, and multiple Monument winners Maurice Garin, Lucien Lesna, Hippolyte Aucouturier, Octave Lapize, Gustave Garrigou, Henri Pélissier, Charles Crupelandt, Jean Forestier, Gilbert Duclos-Lassalle and Laurent Jalabert.

In women's cycling Jeannie Longo is one of the most successful competitors of all time, having won the Tour de France Feminin three times, nine gold medals in road racing and time trialling at the UCI Road World Championships, and the gold in the road race at the 1996 Olympics. Pauline Ferrand-Prévot is a Olympic gold medalist and multiple time world champion in mountain bike and a world champion and Tour de France winner in road cycling.

=== Motorsports ===
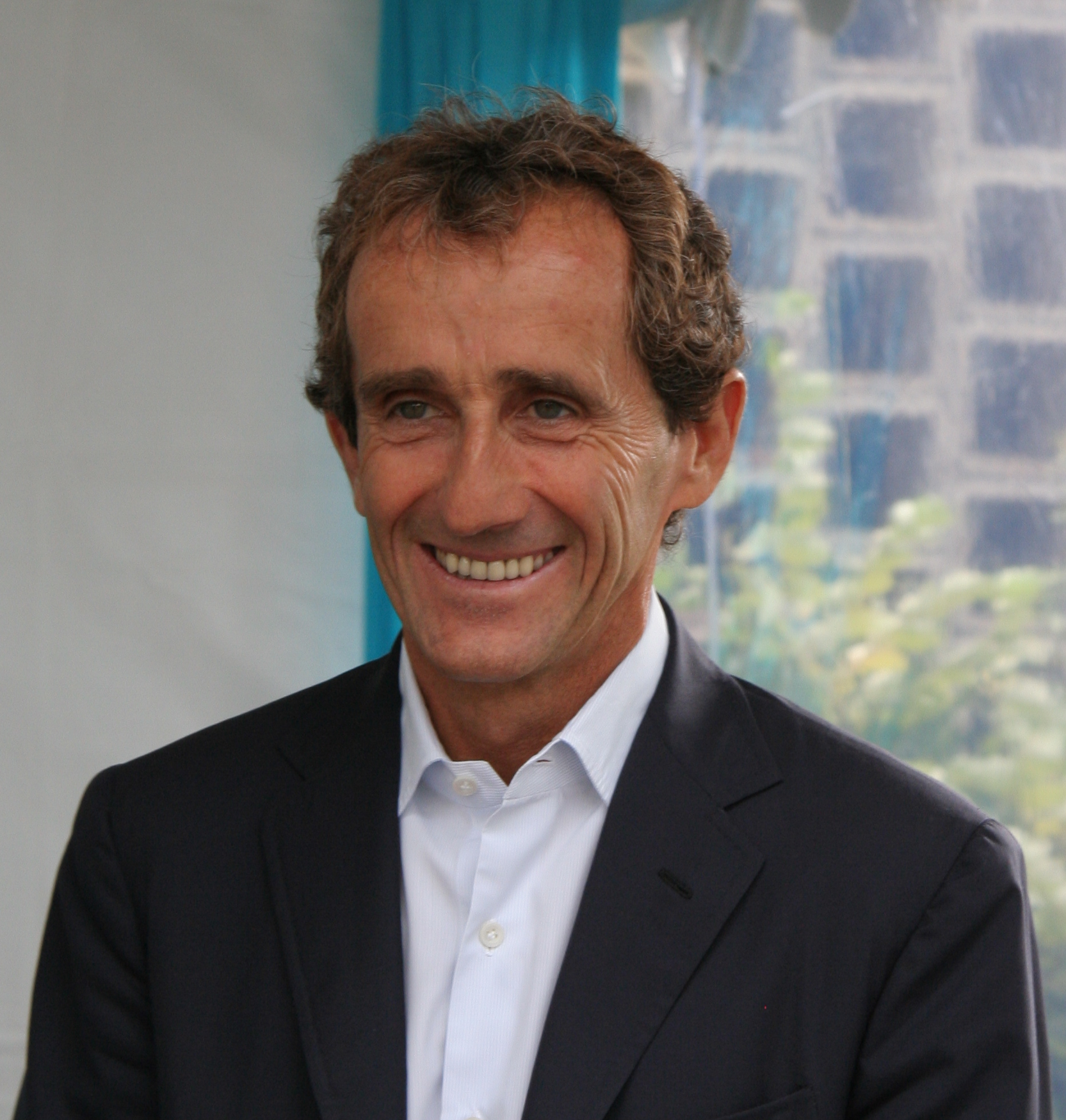
Alain Prost (in 2009) was world champion (4) of Formula One.

Motorsports are very popular in France, especially auto racing and motorcycle racing.

Formula One has a strong connection with and long history in France, having roots in European Grand Prix motor racing, which traces its birth to the 1906 French Grand Prix. Many French circuits have been used since the foundation of the Formula One Championships: Reims-Gueux (1950–1966), Rouen-Les-Essarts (1952–1958), Circuit Charade (1965–1972), Bugatti Circuit (1967), Circuit Paul Ricard (1971–1990 and 2018–2022), Dijon-Prenois (1974–1984), and Circuit de Nevers Magny-Cours (1991–2008). France is home of Formula One World's Constructors' Champions Matra (1969) and Renault (2005 and 2006), and Formula One World Drivers' Champion Alain Prost (1985, 1986, 1989, and 1993). The most recent French Formula One race winner is Esteban Ocon, having won the 2021 Hungarian Grand Prix while racing for Alpine.

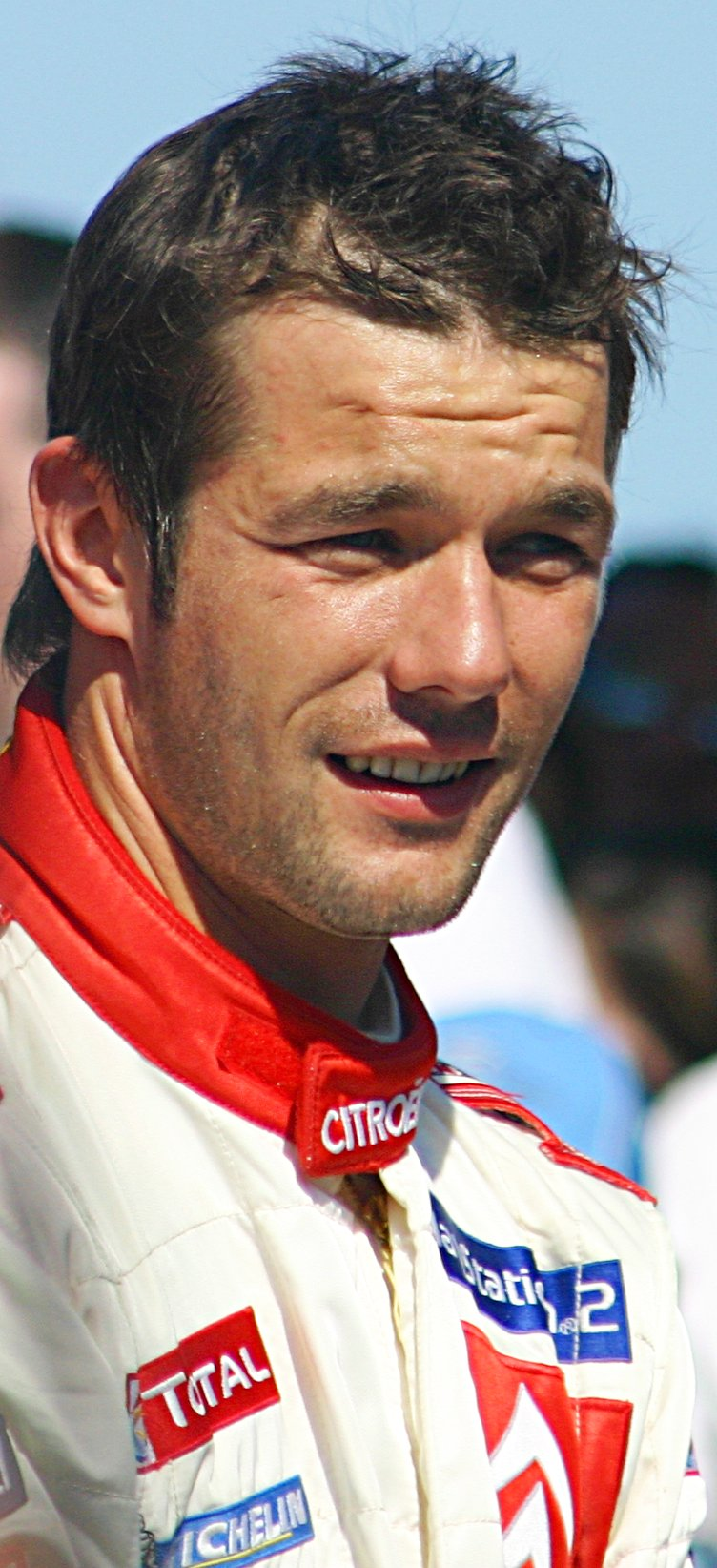
Sébastien Loeb (2005) had been world champion (9) of WRC.

France is also home to the most Champions in Formula Two history with Jean-Pierre Beltoise (1968), Johnny Servoz-Gavin (1969), Jean-Pierre Jarier (1973), Patrick Depailler (1974), Jacques Laffite (1975), Jean-Pierre Jabouille (1976), and René Arnoux (1977). French constructors have also been successful with Matra winning the Championships in 1967, 1968, and 1969, Automobiles Martini in 1975 and 1977, and Renault in 1976 and 1977. France produced five champions in the International Formula 3000 championship, the successor to the European F2 series: Jean Alesi (1989), Érik Comas (1990), Olivier Panis (1993), Jean-Christophe Boullion (1994) and Sébastien Bourdais (2002), tying with Italy as the most successful nation in the formula. Romain Grosjean won the GP2 Asia Series in 2008 and 2011 and the main GP2 Series in 2011, whilst Pierre Gasly won the GP2 title in the series' final season in 2016. Théo Pourchaire won the revived FIA Formula 2 Championship in 2023.

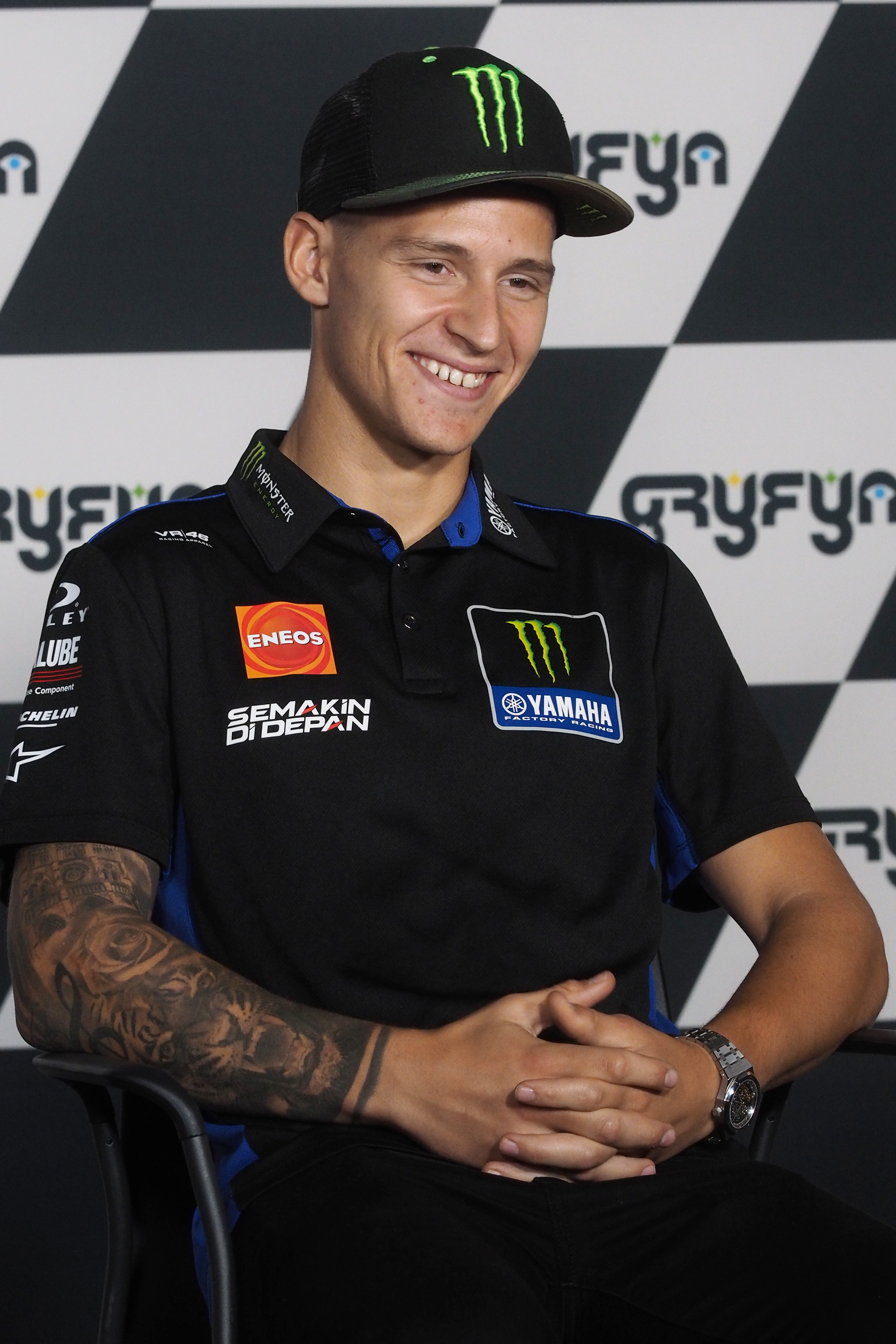
Fabio Quartararo (in 2022) the first French world champion in MotoGP

Touring car racing, although less popular in France than Formula One, has a strong following, especially with four time World Touring Car Championship Drivers' Champion Yvan Muller (2008, 2010, 2011 and 2013). In Sports car racing, France is home to the 24 Hours of Le Mans the world's oldest sports car race in endurance racing, held annually since 1923. Also, French auto racing team Hexis Racing is the current FIA GT1 World Team Champion.

Rallying is very popular in France, with two World Rally Championship rallies being held there: Tour de Corse (1973–2008) and Rallye d'Alsace (2010-today).

French drivers and manufacturers have been very successful in the World Rally Championship, especially since 2000, winning 32 championships (in total) in each competition. Champions include Didier Auriol (1994), Sébastien Loeb (2004, 2005, 2006, 2007, 2008, 2009, 2010, 2011 and 2012, an all-time record) and Sébastien Ogier (2013, 2014, 2015, 2016, 2017, 2018, 2020 and 2021) for the drivers, and Alpine (1973), Peugeot (1985, 1986, 2000, 2001, and 2002), and Citroën (2003, 2004, 2005, 2008, 2009, 2010, 2011, 2012) for the manufacturers.

France holds an annual ice racing championship at the end of each year, called the Andros Trophy.

Other types of auto racing (stock car racing, sports car racing, drag racing, etc.) are more favoured.

France host the French motorcycle Grand Prix currently in Le Mans.

Fabio Quartararo is the first Frenchman to win the premier class of MotoGP in 2021. Also, in Superbike World Championship only two French riders have been champions: Raymond Roche in 1990 and Sylvain Guintoli in 2014.

=== Pétanque ===
Pétanque is mostly played and highly popular in the South of France. Pétanque is not considered a sport by many northern Frenchmen, though the sport is internationally recognized by the IOC. Professional players play the competitive form of Pétanque, which is called Pétanque Sport, under precise rules. The competitive form is played by about 480,000 persons licensed with the Fédération Française de Pétanque et Jeu Provençal (FFPJP). The FFPJP is the 4th largest sports federation in France.

=== Sailing ===
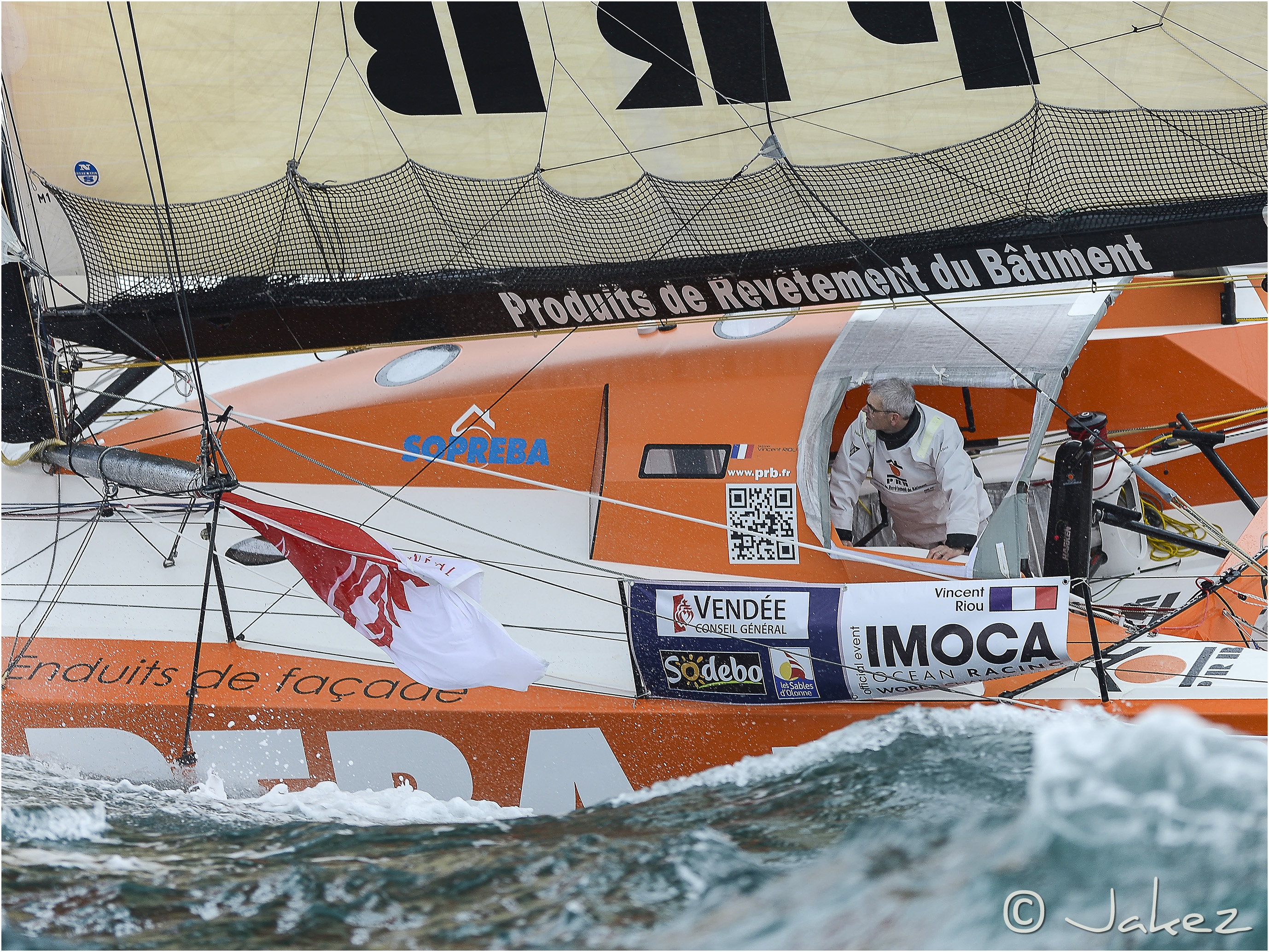
Vincent Riou won the Vendée Globe in 2004

Professional sailing in France is centered on singlehanded/shorthanded ocean racing with the pinnacle of this branch of the sport being the Vendée Globe singlehanded around the world race which starts every 4 years from the French Atlantic. Since its inception, every winner of the Vendée Globe has been French.

=== Skiing ===
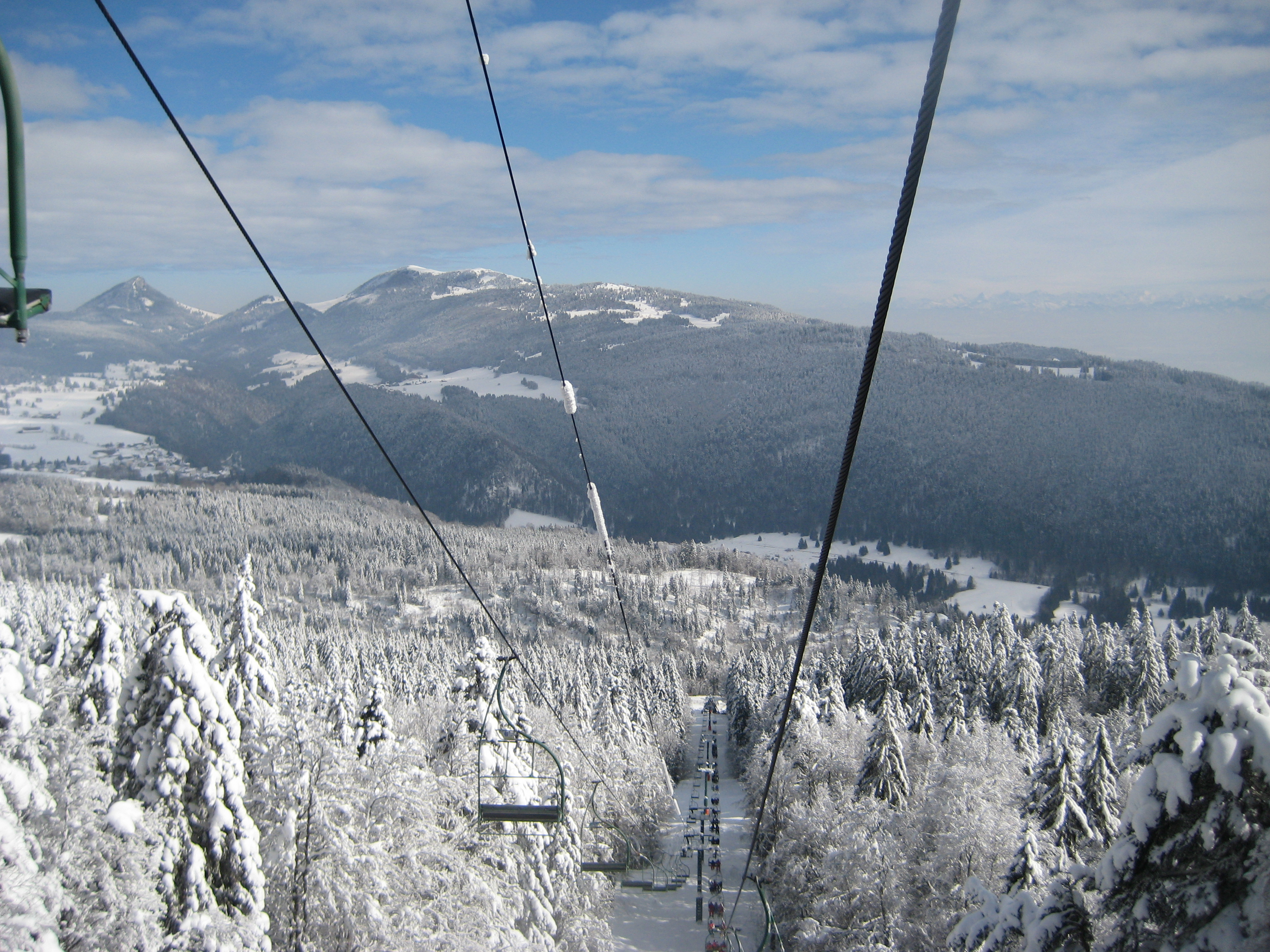
Winter chairlift above a snowy French mountain, a glimpse of alpine sport

Skiing is a popular sport in France. The best places for skiing are the mountainous areas in the east (Alps, Jura, Vosges), south (Pyrenees) and center (Massif Central) of the country, where most French ski resorts are located.

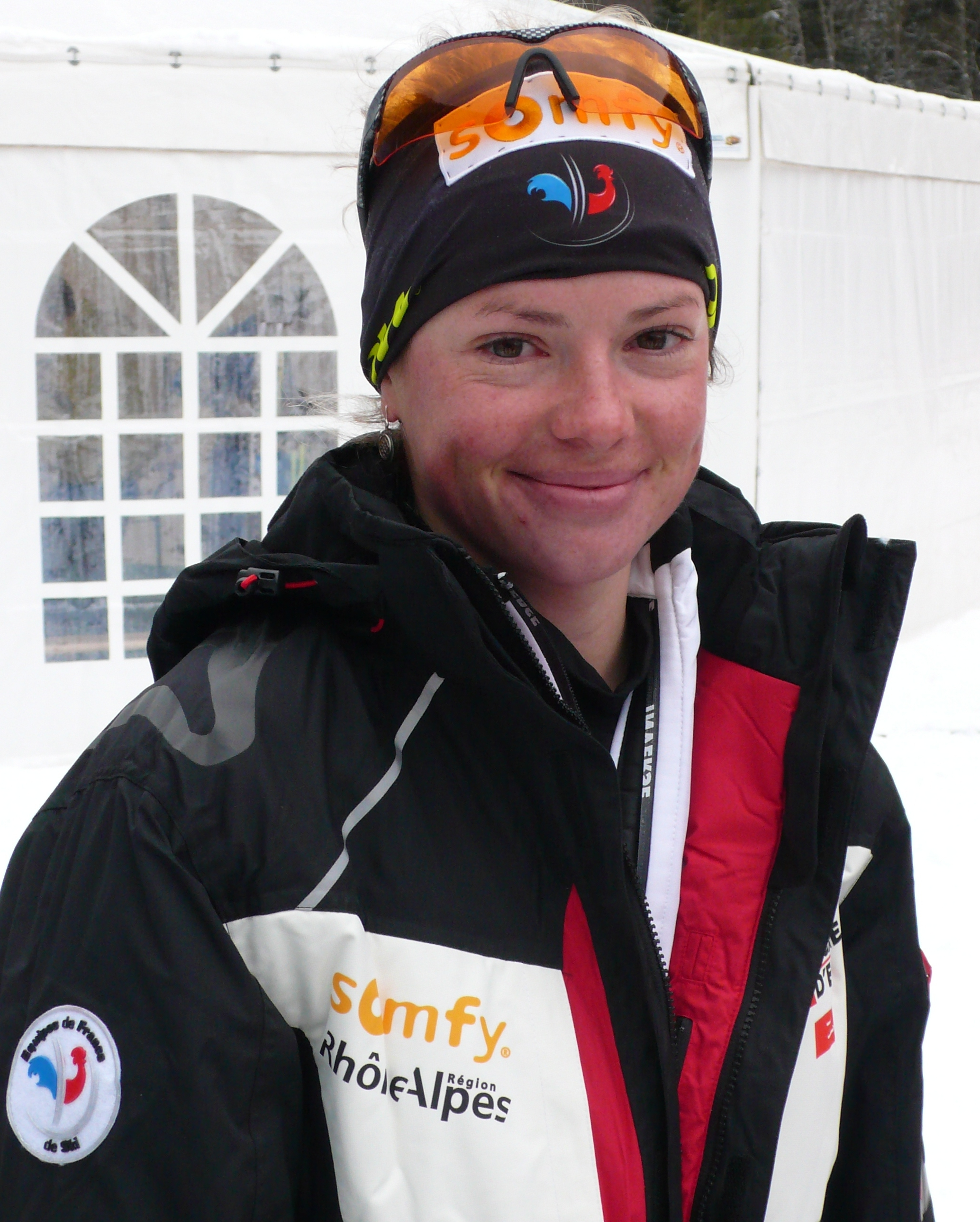
Marie Dorin-Habert biathlete, Olympic gold medalist and multiple World Championship medalist.

Émile Allais won four World Championship golds in the 1930s. Henri Oreiller won Olympic gold at the 1948 Winter Olympics. Jean-Claude Killy dominated alpine skiing in the late 1960s, winning all three alpine skiing golds on offer at the 1968 Winter Olympics on French snow in Grenoble. These events also served as the 1968 Alpine Skiing World Championships, and in addition, Killy won the World Championship Combined event in 1968 to add to golds in the Downhill and Combined won at the 1966 World Championships. He also won the first two overall Alpine Skiing World Cup titles. Marielle Goitschel won two Olympic golds, an additional five World Championship golds and three discipline World Cup titles in the 1960s. Guy Périllat was a double World Championship gold medallist in the 1960s. Fabienne Serrat won two golds at the 1974 World Championships. Carole Merle won six World Cup discipline titles in the late 1980s and early 1990s, and was World Champion in giant slalom in 1993. More recently Luc Alphand won the overall World Cup in 1997 and four discipline titles in Downhill and Super-G. Jean-Baptiste Grange was Slalom World Cup champion in 2009 and Slalom World Champion in 2011 and 2015. Tessa Worley was World Cup champion in giant slalom in 2017 and 2022 and won four World Championship golds in the 2010s. In January 2017 Alexis Pinturault set a new record for World Cup wins by a French skier when he took his 19th victory in a giant slalom in Adelboden, breaking Jean-Claude Killy's record.

French success in cross-country skiing has been somewhat more limited. However Vincent Vittoz did win a gold medal in the 15 km + 15 km double pursuit at the FIS Nordic World Ski Championships in 2005. He also finished as runner up in the Distance World Cup for three consecutive seasons from 2004/05 to 2006/07.

Jason Lamy-Chappuis has been an extremely successful competitor in Nordic combined. He won a gold medal in the Individual normal hill/10 km competition at the 2010 Winter Olympics as well as five World Championship golds and three consecutive FIS Nordic Combined World Cups between 2009/10 and 2011/12.

France has enjoyed success in Biathlon in recent years. Raphaël Poirée won seven Biathlon World Championship golds and four overall Biathlon World Cups. He is the joint second most successful male biathlete of all time in terms of winning overall World Cup titles, and scored 44 World Cup victories. Martin Fourcade has won 13 World Championship golds, 7 overall World Cup titles, 1 gold medal in Vancouver 2010 Olympic Games, 2 gold medals in the Sochi 2014 Olympic Games, and 3 gold medals in the Pyeongchang 2018 Olympic Games.

=== Horse riding ===
Equestrianism is the third most popular Olympic sport in France, and the leading sport for women.

=== Tennis ===
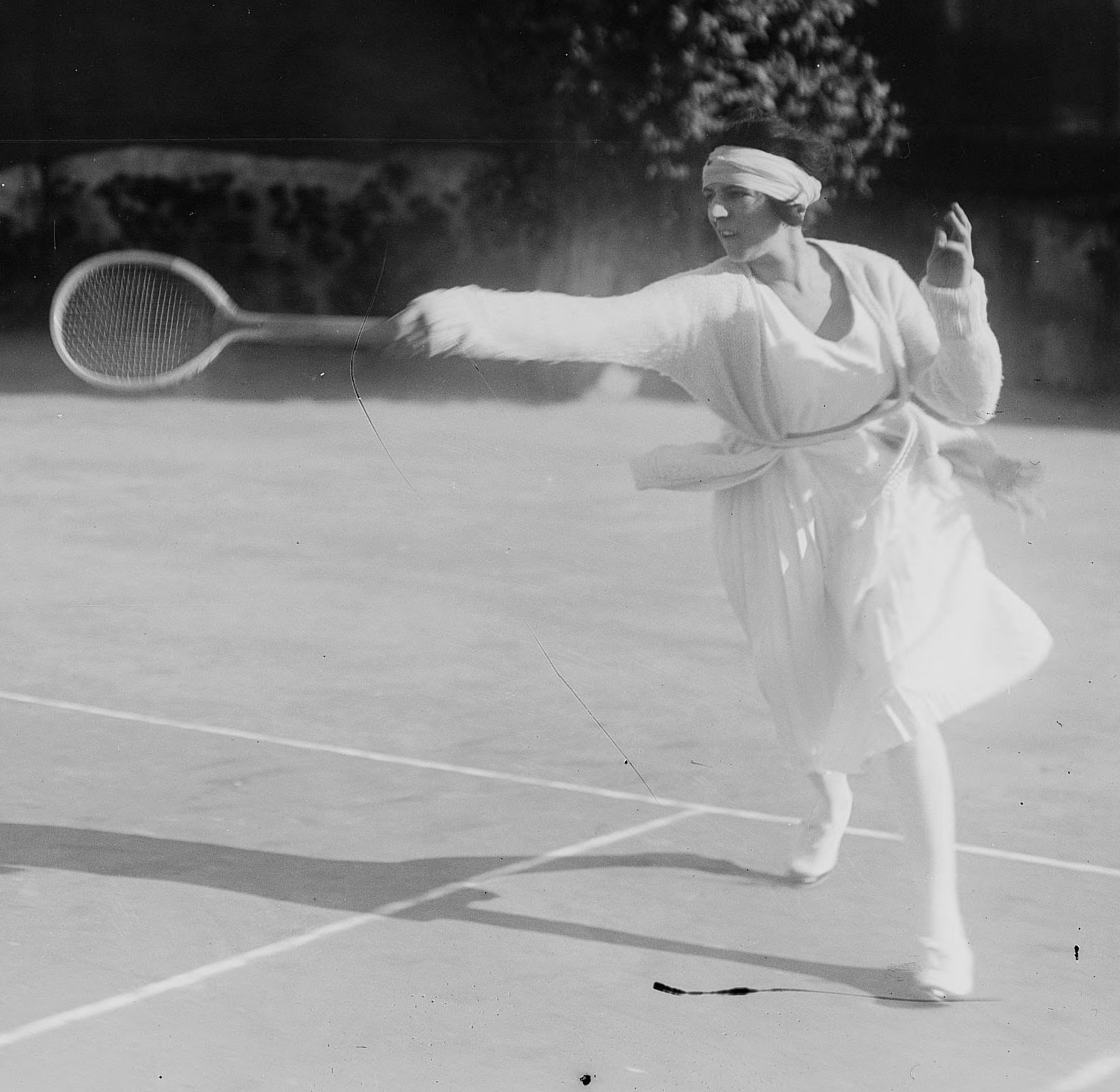
Suzanne Lenglen dominated tennis in the 1920s, winning multiple Grand Slam titles and Olympic gold medals.

Tennis is the second most popular French sport in terms of the number of licensed players with 1,111,316 licensed tennis players in France (2012).

France holds the tennis Grand Slam tournament Roland Garros. Some current French high-level players include Arthur Fils, Lucas Pouille and Kristina Mladenovic. Other stars from the past include Henri Cochet, René Lacoste, Yannick Noah, Guy Forget, Henri Leconte, Jo-Wilfried Tsonga, Gaël Monfils, Richard Gasquet, Françoise Dürr, Amélie Mauresmo, Mary Pierce, Marion Bartoli, Caroline Garcia and Alizé Cornet.

== Minor sports ==
=== Canoeing ===
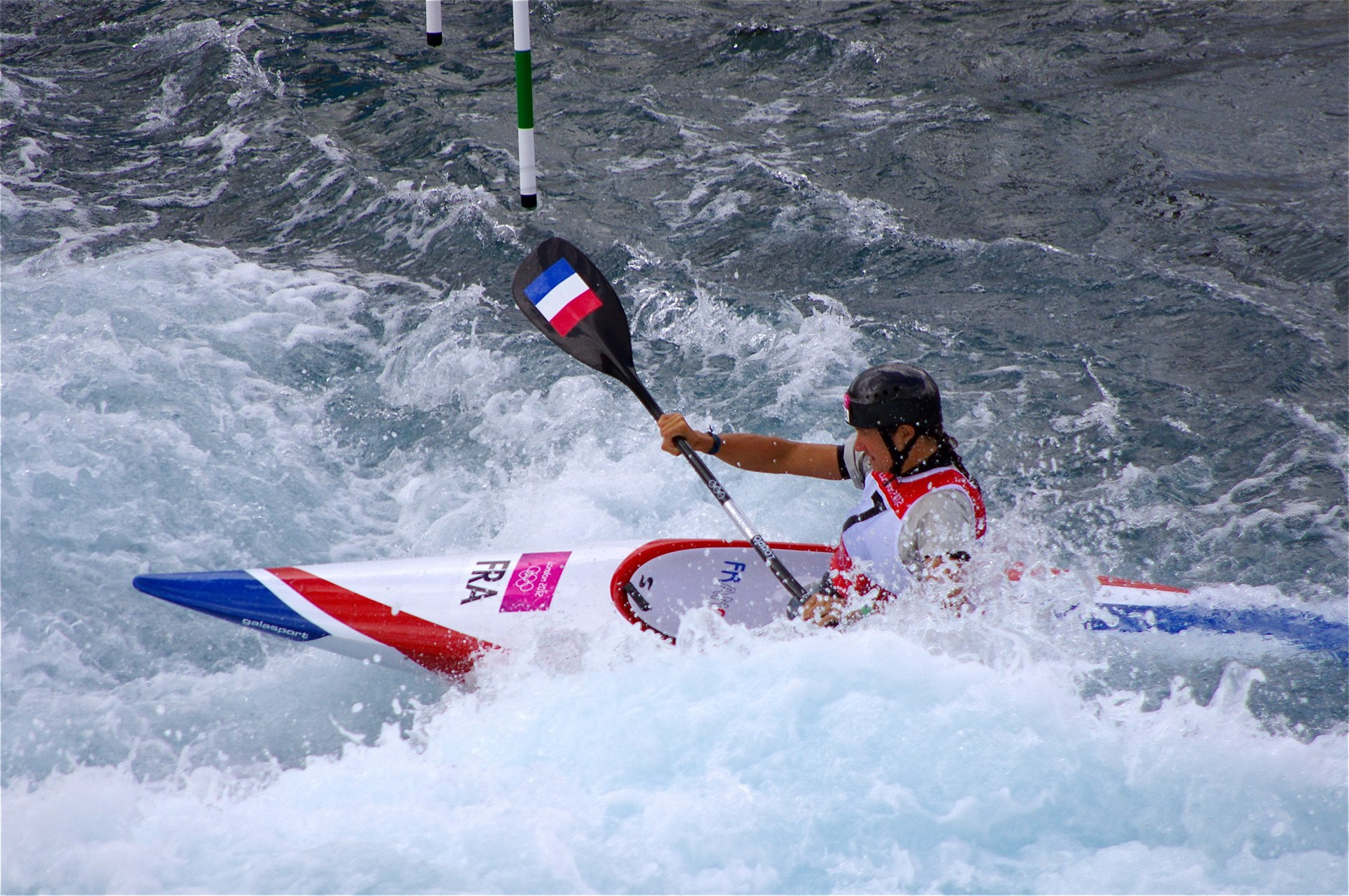
Émilie Fer canoeist, Olympic gold medalist.

France has a notable presence in canoeing, with several accomplished athletes achieving success at national and international levels. Some prominent French canoeists include Tony Estanguet, Denis Gargaud Chanut, Émilie Fer, Mathieu Goubel, and Sébastien Combot.

=== Ice hockey ===
Ice hockey is a minor sport in France. The governing body is the FFHG which administers the national championship, Ligue Magnus (founded in 1907). The national team is currently ranked in the top 20 in the IIHF World Ranking. In recent years, only a few French ice hockey players have played in the NHL, the premier ice hockey competition on the planet based in the United States and Canada, including Stanley Cup winner Cristobal Huet and Vancouver Canucks forward Antoine Roussel.

=== Judo ===
Teddy Riner, has twelve World Championship gold medals and five Olympic gold medals, is one of the most successful French judoka.

=== Roller hockey ===
Roller hockey (or "rink hockey" in American English), is steadily growing in France. The men's national team captured its first medal at the World Cup in 2022, whereas in the 2026 edition the maiden victory was sealed after a penalty shoot-out in the final.

=== Rugby league ===
Rugby league (rugby à treize) has been played in France since the 1930s, and is most popular, like rugby union, in the south of the country. The sport arguably achieved its height in popularity in the 1950s and 1960s when the France national team made it to World Cup finals and won test series against Australia, Great Britain and New Zealand. Two French-based teams, Catalans Dragons and Toulouse Olympique, participate in the Super League, the top level of the British rugby league system, which has helped boost the sport's profile and led to growth in player numbers.

=== Savate ===
Savate, also known as French boxing, is a French martial art, similar to kickboxing, that uses punches and kicks. Savate was developed in the 1800s on the sailing ships and back streets of France Savate, which translates to old shoe, differs from most other striking arts that use kicks, as Savate practitioners wear shoes and can only kick with their feet, wearing hard-tipped kicking shoes—kicking with one's shins is disallowed. At the beginning of the 20th century, it was one of the most popular martial arts in mainland Europe.

Savate was an Olympic sport, but only at the 1924 Summer Olympics in Paris.

Famous modern practitioners include former Savate world champion Gerard Gordeau, who competed at the first-ever UFC show, and made it to the tournament final at UFC 1.

In boxing, Georges Carpentier, Marcel Cerdan, and Fabrice Tiozzo are the most well-known and decorated figures from France on the international stage.

In MMA, Ciryl Gane became the first French heavyweight champion in 2026.

=== Swimming ===
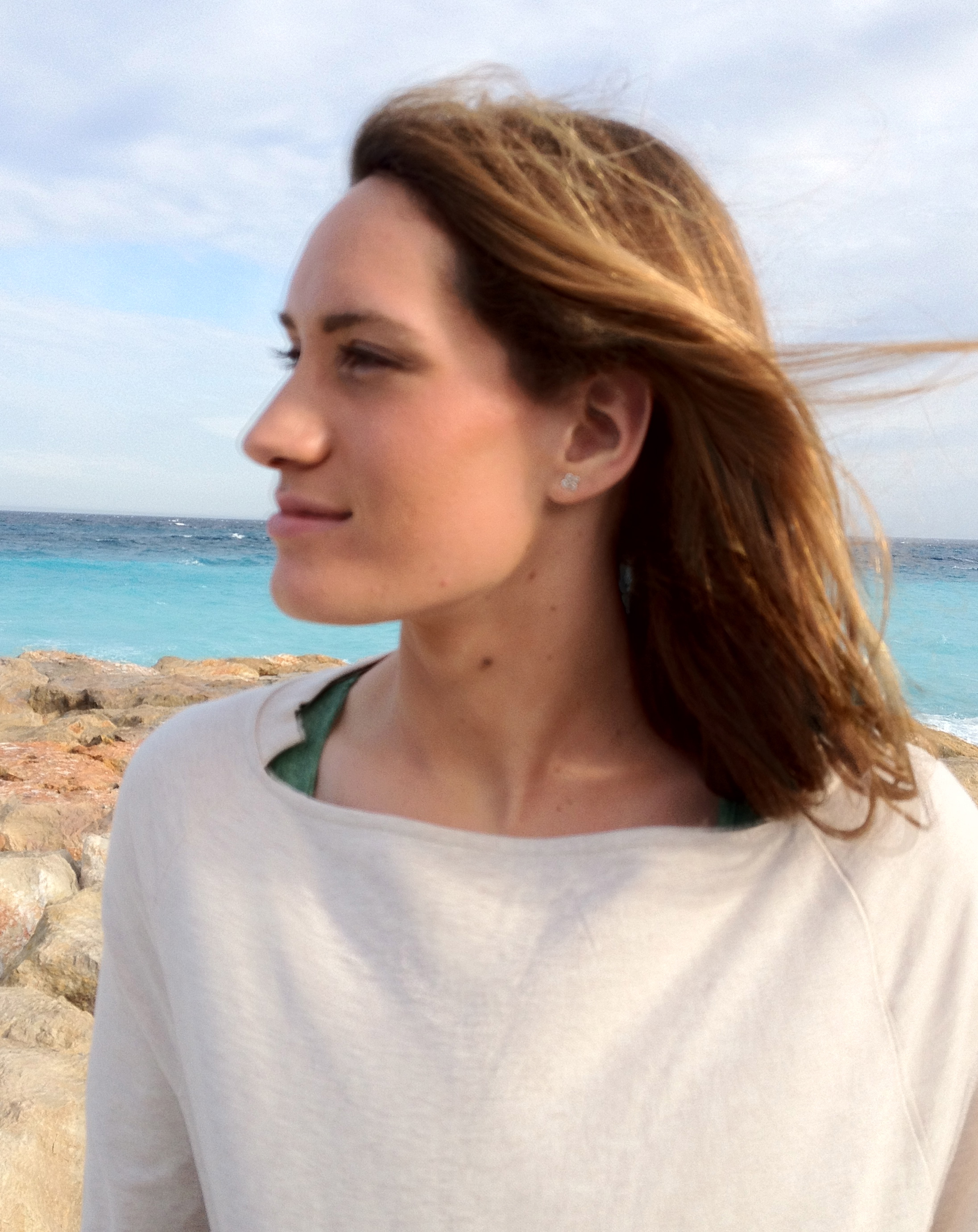
Camille Muffat former swimmer, Olympic and World Championship gold medalist.

Some notable French swimmers in competition are Camille Muffat, Laure Manaudou, Yannick Agnel, Alain Bernard, Virginie Dedieu, Florent Manaudou and Léon Marchand.

=== Track and field ===
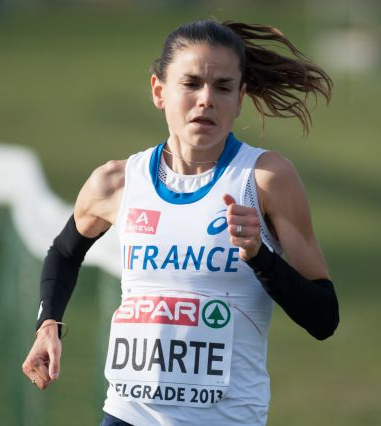
Sophie Duarte Long-distance runner, European Cross Country Championships gold medalist.

Some prominent French track and field athletes include Alain Mimoun, Michel Jazy, Guy Drut, Renaud Lavillenie, Marie-José Pérec, Pierre-Ambroise Bosse, Mahiedine Mekhissi-Benabbad, Christophe Lemaitre, Kevin Mayer and Marie Collonvillé.

=== Volleyball ===
And the France men's national volleyball team consecutively became double Olympic champion in 2021 and 2024, like the Soviets in the 1960s and the Americans in the 1980s.

Men's national team in beach volleyball that competed at the 2018–2020 CEV Beach Volleyball Continental Cup.

== See also ==
- History of sport in France
- Brevet d'État d'éducateur sportif
- Union des Sociétés Françaises de Sports Athlétiques
- Minister of Youth Affairs and Sports (France)
- Rayon Sportif Féminin
- History of sport in France
