= Rayon Sportif Féminin =

French Catholic sports movement

Rayon sportif féminin
- Sport: Women and multisport
- Abbreviation: RSF
- Founded: 1919
- Regional affiliation: Merger with FGSPF from October 1940
- Headquarters: 140, rue du Bac, Paris VII; 19, rue de Varennes, Paris VII

The Rayon Sportif Féminin (RSF, Female Sports Division) was a former Catholic sports movement exclusively for young girls. It was initiated in Paris in 1919 by the Daughters of Charity and was also one of France's first federal organizations for women's sports. At the request of the episcopate, it quickly expanded to other religious congregations and parish youth organizations. By the eve of World War II, it had amassed a membership of 60,000 gymnasts dispersed throughout the entire national territory. In the fall of 1940, the administration of the French State's General Education Secretariat, of which Marie-Thérèse Eyquem was a prominent member, compelled its affiliation with the Fédération Gymnastique et Sportive des Patronages de France, with which it was already closely associated. This merger was formalized after the Liberation in 1945, with the federation renamed the Fédération Sportive de France in 1947 and then the Fédération Sportive et Culturelle de France in 1968. Women's sports, particularly gymnastics, now constitute most of its licensed members.

== History ==
During the Restoration period, female religious education institutions began to prioritize physical exercises, a shift mirrored by the success of the book Callisthénie ou somascétique naturelle appropriée à l'éducation des jeunes filles (Calisthenics or Natural Somascetic Exercises Adapted to the Education of Young Girls) by Clias in 1843. The Third Republic further promoted the development of gymnastics, intending to prepare boys for military service and girls for civic engagement. (Note: Tranvouez 1999, p. 228) The emergence of the first French women's gymnastics societies in 1899 in Paris and Valenciennes marked a significant development in this regard. In 1912, the Union Française de Gymnastique Féminine (UFGF) was established to federate these groups, thereby fostering the growth and organization of the female gymnastics movement. In 1921, it underwent a merger with the women's sections of the Union des Sociétés Françaises de Sports Athlétiques (USFSA), resulting in the formation of the Fédération Féminine Française de Gymnastique et d'Éducation Physique (FFFGEP).

Catholic women's sports were not overlooked. In 1902, four years after establishing the new federation for male parish youth groups, Dr. Michaux, President of the Central Commission of Parish Groups, published recommendations on the subject in the Bulletin des Patronages. For instance, in Haute-Loire, Catholic sports emerged as early as 1911, well before the Great War, with the Jeune Garde Rubanière in Saint-Just-Malmont.

The war impacted the development of women's sports in France, as evidenced by the welcome given to female athletes at the USFSA's national athletics championship in 1917. A notable figure in this context was Irène Popard, the first female graduate of the higher education course in physical education. She had already introduced physical education into Parisian girl scouting, and her influence on the field was considerable. Concurrently, two Parisian associations, Femina Sports and Académia, established a federation known as the Fédération des Sociétés Féminines Sportives de France (FSFSF), which was officially recognized on January 18, 1918. The following year, Alice Milliat was appointed as the federation's president. Catholic women's sports, which only began to organize in 1919, rapidly established a structured framework, becoming one of the first French women's sports federations. By the eve of World War II, it claimed 60,000 gymnasts across the national territory.

=== Era of the Daughters of Charity (1919–1934) ===
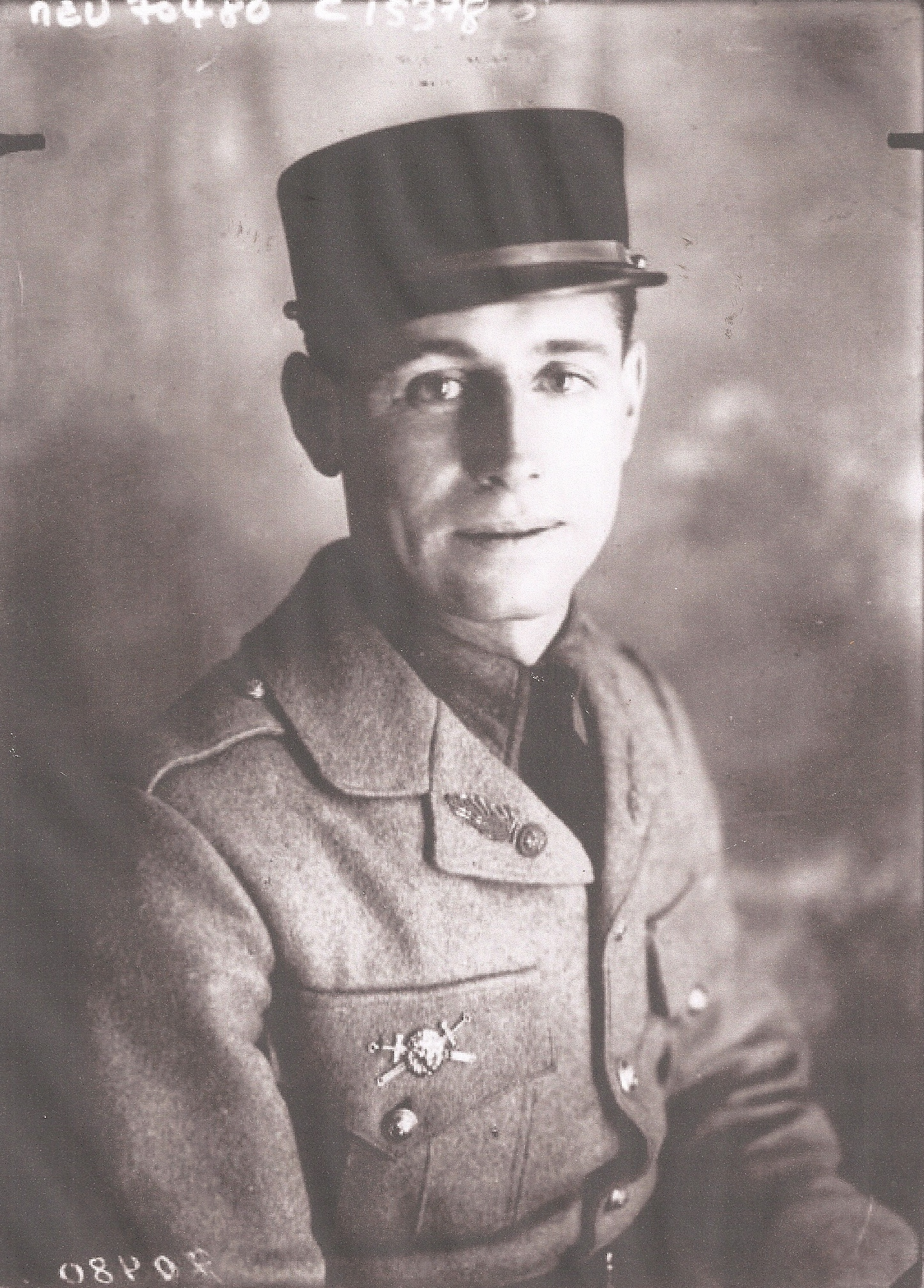
Félix Mathey, FGSPF athletics champion and RSF technical director.

In the aftermath of the war, the nuns, who had been excluded from the educational field, persisted in practicing physical exercises for the young girls attending their institutions. The National Bloc, which had authorized the re-establishment of activity for congregations, granted a Daughter of Charity, Sister Roussel, the opportunity to request a coach from the Gymnastic and Sports Federation of French Patronages (FGSPF) for her Enfants de Marie in Le Raincy in 1919. (Note: Groeninger 2004, p. 166) The federation appointed Félix Mathey, an eight-time federal athletics champion and future member of the Higher Council for Physical Education, (Note: Hervet 1948, p. 150) to oversee the program. Mathey, a member of the C.A. Rosaire, provided both technical and moral assurances, thus establishing the Stella Raincéenne. (Note: Hervet 1948, p. 100)

In the subsequent year, Mathey assumed leadership of a second Parisian society, the Tour d'Auvergne. (Note: Groeninger 2004, p. 167) Concurrently, many additional associations came into being, including Le Chardonnet, (Note: Hervet 1948, p. 101) Les Libellules de Saint-Mandé, Les Fauvettes Montmartroises, Les Libellules de Clamart, and Les Marines de Saint-Roch. (Note: Hervet 1948, p. 103) In 1920, the FGSPF Congress addressed the matter of women's sports, yet no definitive resolution was reached. The organization of annual events in Le Raincy served as a point of convergence for Parisian societies, while the religious hierarchy advocated for the expansion of sports sections within female parish groups, to safeguard young Christian girls from what was perceived as the influence of liberal ideas in secular societies. By 1926, the FGSPF Congress reported the establishment of a Women's Physical Education Federation, which had established a regional union for Île-de-France, under the oversight of Dr. Mayet, a federal vice president.

However, by 1928, the RSF had successfully regained control of the situation, largely due to the proactive efforts of Sister Bouvier. (Note: Groeninger 2004, p. 169) (Note: Sister Bouvier’s name was given to a street in the 5th district of Lyon.) The following year, the RSF emblem was formally presented at the Lyon competition by Cardinal Gerlier, a prominent proponent of social Catholicism. (Note: Tranvouez 1999, p. 229) The Daughters of Saint Vincent de Paul played a pivotal role in promoting physical education and sports, fostering an environment conducive to the growth and development of these activities. The symbolism of the rays emanating from the Virgin's hands on the Miraculous Medal at 140 Rue du Bac served as a source of inspiration and motivation for the RSF leaders who met there. (Note: Jouaret 2012, p. 137) The organization experienced consistent growth, reaching 80 societies in the Paris region by 1931. This milestone coincided with the official declaration of the RSF under its then-current name. (Note: Jouaret 2012, p. 136) During the same year, the RSF flag was formally blessed by Canon Pasteau during the Ivry competition.

=== Expansion of the Rayon Sportif Féminin (1934–1940) ===
The development of the RSF, which was in alignment with the desire of Pope Pius XI to see Catholicism adapt to the modern world, was not unnoticed by the Church of France. On February 14, 1934, the following declaration was made: "All the faithful are called to collaborate (in the apostolate) because all can work in the Lord's vineyard," the Archbishop of Paris also requested that the Daughters of Charity open their activities to parish youth groups and those affiliated with other religious orders. As the RSF grew, it began to attract the interest of public authorities as well. During the 1936 festival, which hosted numerous societies from the provinces, the Minister of Public Health expressed gratitude to the Daughters of Charity "on behalf of France." Collaboration with the FGSPF became particularly close, involving three technical commissions (Physical Education, Games, and Sports, and Free Education, which oversaw the initial and ongoing training of school staff), with many instructors participating in one or the other. (Note: Tranvouez 1999, p. 230) A notable outcome of this collaboration was the implementation of a medical certificate requirement for the practice of sports in 1937. This requirement, which had been in effect for seven years for male athletes under the initiative of Dr. Récamier, served as a model for the subsequent adoption of similar measures in other countries.

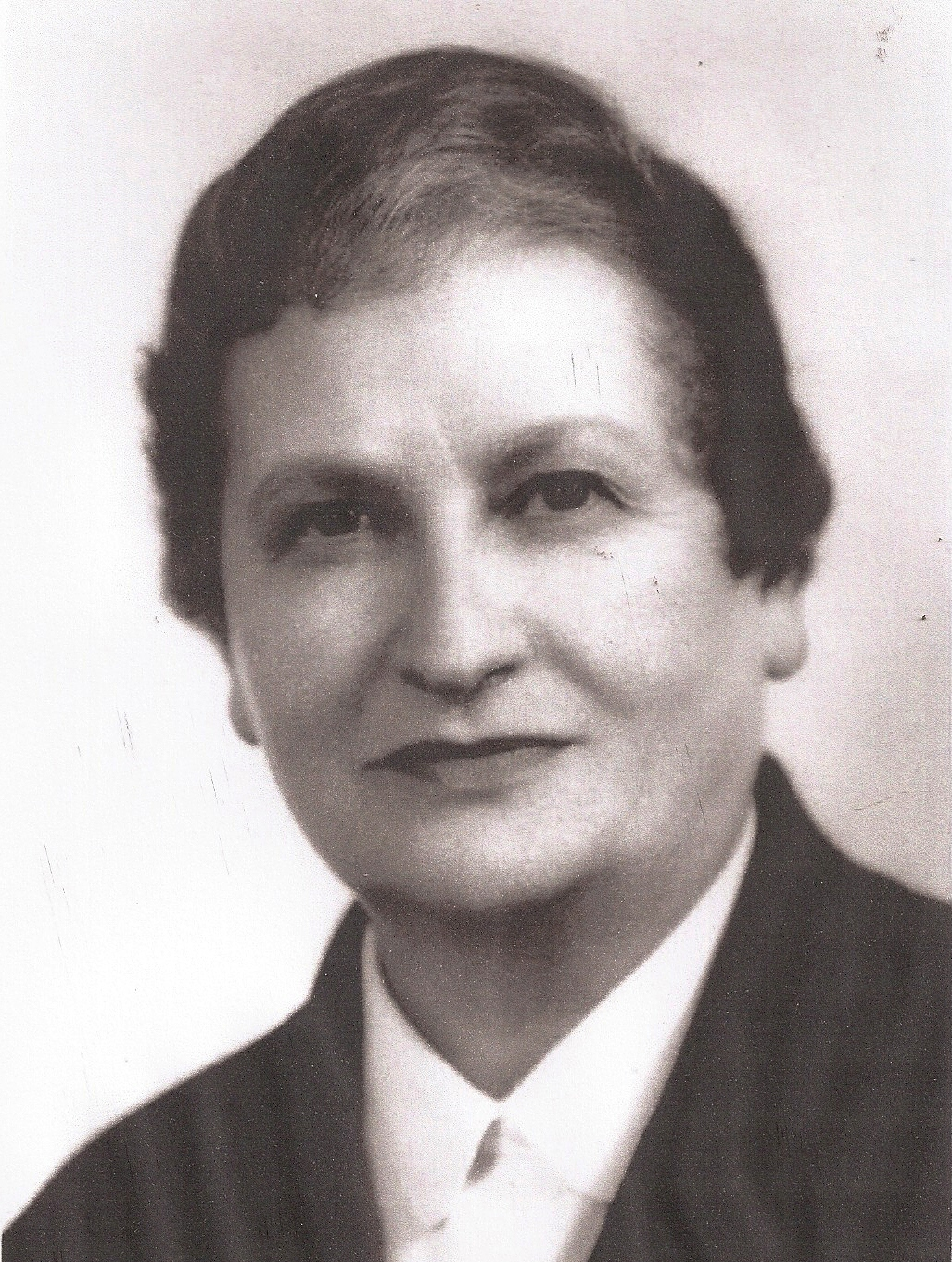
Marie-Thérèse Eyquem is behind the development of RSF.

At the inception of the Popular Front era, under the leadership of Monsignor Beaussart and Monsignor Courbe, the RSF officially underwent a name change, (Note: However, the term Rayon continues to be used colloquially, and its reference still persists after the Liberation within the French Sports Federation to refer to "the females.") becoming the Fédération Nationale d'Éducation Physique Féminine (FNEPF). On October 15, 1937, the inaugural issue of Le Rayon Sportif Féminin, the new FNEPF bulletin, was published. This shift marked a significant departure from the Daughters of Charity, as the organization relocated from the Motherhouse at 140 Rue du Bac in Paris to 19 Rue de Varenne. Before this transition, independent diocesan unions, such as the Union Jeanne d'Arc of Lyon, had been affiliated with the FNEPF. The secularized leadership structure of the FNEPF mirrored that of the FGSPF, comprising a central committee (Note: The decision-making body of the federation is called the central committee before becoming the board of directors.) and technical committee in Paris and diocesan committees in the provinces. The initial central committee, presided over by its president, Mme Corpet, united all the women's youth movements, with Armand Thibaudeau representing the FGSPF.

The integration with the male federation was particularly evident at the diocesan committee level, where a significant number of members belonged to the departmental FGSPF union. Competitions proliferated across the provinces, and on April 25, 1937, during the first Rayon competition in Algiers, the Violettes de Saint-Vincent were awarded the flag blessed by Monsignor Leynaud, Archbishop of Algiers. In the subsequent Rayon competition in Normandy, held on July 18 and 19, 1938, under the direction of Félix Mathey, the regional flag was bestowed upon the Étoile Marine of Fécamp, while the cadet banner was awarded to the Écureuils of Rouen. The press highlighted the achievement of two instructors, including the top graduate, Miss Simone Lesueur from Saint-Clément de Rouen, who had earned the state diploma in physical education. By 1939, a network of fifty-three committees was in place, organizing annual gymnastics festivals for the 650 affiliated associations, with Paris accounting for 10% of the membership, followed by Lyon and Bordeaux.

Basketball witnessed a significant surge in popularity, with 40 teams documented in the Paris region alone by 1937. (Note: Tranvouez 1999, p. 231) This phenomenon was not confined to the Paris region; it spread nationwide. Following the war, numerous men's teams from the "patros" emerged within associations initially established under the Rayon, as evidenced by the number that remained dedicated to Jeanne d'Arc. This development was spearheaded by a young permanent secretary, Marie-Thérèse Eyquem. She would go on to become a prominent figure in women's sports and later in French political life.

=== A forced union that turned out well (1940–1945) ===
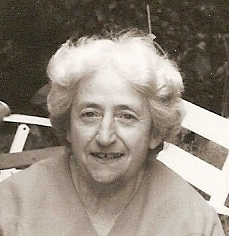
Eugénie Duisit, RSF's great witness within the FSCF.

In October 1940, an ordinance from the new French State stipulated that each women's federation must affiliate with a men's federation, a mandate that the Church, consistent in its opposition to co-ed activities, was compelled to accept. The RSF affiliated with the FGSPF under a protocol that involved merging central committees while maintaining the autonomy of technical management. The Occupation of half of France compelled the FGSPF to divide into two sections: Secretary General Armand Thibaudeau remained in Paris in the occupied zone, while Eugénie Duisit, an RSF leader already in Lyon, was delegated to the free zone. (Note: Jouaret 2012, p. 156) In November 1942, Duisit moved to Algeria to join the Free French Army and distinguished herself during the Italian campaign. (Note: Groeninger 2004, p. 124) The Lyon delegation was only disbanded on January 1, 1945. (Note: Jouaret 2012, p. 159)

Concurrently, Marie-Thérèse Eyquem advanced her administrative career in Vichy under the auspices of Jean Borotra and subsequently Joseph Pascot. (Note: Jouaret 2012, p. 154) This distinguished position enabled her to streamline the operations of the RSF. Her experience and role as deputy to Armand Thibaudeau (Note: Groeninger 2004, p. 185) within the FGSPF enabled her to distinguish herself by organizing large-scale events such as the Fête de Coubertin and the Fête de la Sportive, with the assistance of Olga Batany, general instructor of the RSF and later of the FGSPF. (Note: Hervet 1948, p. 114) Vichy's general education policy mandated that all Christian youth movements engage in physical education. Given that this practice necessitated affiliation with a recognized organization, many movements joined the FGSPF, (Note: Jouaret 2012, pp. 156, 157) which led to the necessity for structural adaptations. Consequently, in 1941, the FGSPF, which had already established a boys' school commission (the Union générale sportive de l'enseignement libre, or UGSEL), created a corresponding girls' commission under the direction of Mother Sainte-Monique to address the mounting demand for supervision. Consequently, federal gatherings were promptly reinstated, as evidenced by the event held at Croix de Berny on July 7, 1941.

Following the Liberation, the RSF emerged as a pivotal element within the women's sports movement, boasting a membership of 200,000 and a network of 2,000 societies. This resurgence was precipitated by the 1943 ordinance, which had briefly restored the organization's autonomy. On January 1, 1945, the women of the Central Committee resolved to maintain the RSF within the FGSPF, which subsequently evolved into the French Sports Federation (FSF) on June 22, 1946. This new appellation was officially recorded on March 22 of the following year and underwent a subsequent evolution into the French Sports and Cultural Federation (FSCF) in 1968. Marie-Thérèse Eyquem's ascent within the organization was rapid, leading to her international prominence. (Note: Hervet 1948, p. 115) However, her political commitments were eventually deemed incompatible with the association's stance on neutrality, resulting in President Gilbert Olivier's request for her resignation. (Note: Jouaret 2012, pp. 239–240) Consequently, she lost her international mandates within the Fédération internationale catholique d'éducation physique et sportive (FICEP). Her sole remaining connection to this bygone era was her friend Eugénie Duisit, who, with a more understated presence, continued to oversee gymnastic activities and the training of instructors until her retirement in April 1974. (Note: Jouaret 2012, p. 503)

== Functioning ==
=== Technical content at RSF ===
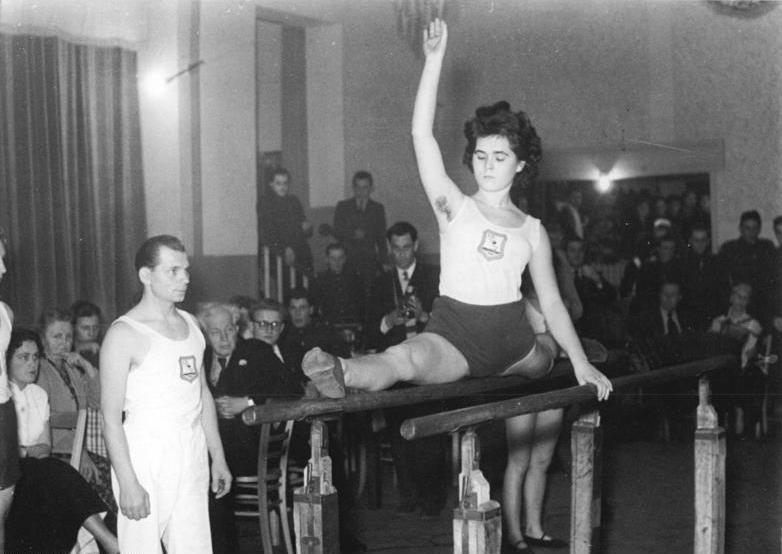
Women's parallel bars.

Félix Mathey served as the technical director of RSF from 1923 to 1937. A graduate of the Joinville School in 1919, after having been an instructor at Saint-Cyr and Saint-Maixent, he left a lasting military imprint, evident for years through parades and group exercises. Initially, the RSF curriculum bore resemblance to maneuvers conducted in military courtyards, but it later evolved into segmental gymnastics, which quickly broadened to rhythmic gymnastics deemed less tedious. The directives and methods of Irène Popard and Yvonne Simon-Siégel served as references, and practical exercises requiring little equipment, such as jumping, running, and throwing, were incorporated. Only the wealthiest sections practiced with parallel bars, though their use was strongly encouraged. (Note: For young girls, parallel bars were replaced by asymmetric bars at the 1950 Basel World Championships.) The preparation for the Brevet Sportif Populaire (BSP) — inspired by the Soviet certificate "Ready for Work and Defense of the Fatherland" and created by Léo Lagrange in 1937 — was highly successful within RSF, becoming a major focus of training sessions. In Paris, the departmental union reserved times at municipal swimming pools to introduce young girls from member associations to swimming in privacy. Significant growth was also seen in basketball. Moreover, a chalet in Valloire offered members affordable accommodations, facilitating their introduction to winter sports.

=== Moral formation ===
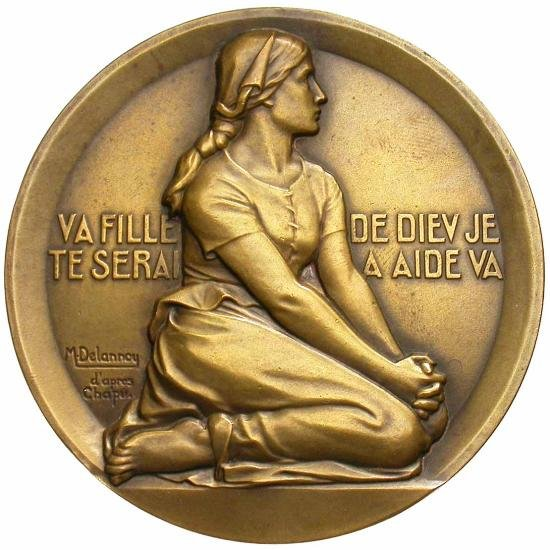
Jehanne, RSF reference.

In the domain of moral formation, RSF employed a didactic approach, leveraging a set of three tools to engage its extensive membership base. The first of these tools drew inspiration from contemporary events, taking the form of a prayer to Joan of Arc, who had been formally recognized as a saint in 1920 and designated as the fourth secondary patron of France through an apostolic letter on March 2, 1922. This decision led to tensions with secular factions that criticized what they perceived as the Church's "confiscation" of a "national heroine."In response to this claim of Joan of Arc as a national figure, the secular government of Alexandre Millerand instituted a national celebration of Joan of Arc on the second Sunday of May—commemorating the liberation of Orléans—through a vote on June 24, 1920. Furthermore, the Union of Gymnastics Societies of France (USGF), an organization with a secular orientation, held its federal festival in Orléans in 1929 to commemorate the 500th anniversary of Joan of Arc's legacy. During the event, a prayer was recited by gymnasts from all sections present at the stadium at the beginning of each competition. (Note: Tranvouez 1999, p. 240) The following excerpts from the prayer are provided below:

Messire Dieu premier servi
Sainte Jeanne d'Arc, notre patronne bien aimée
[...]
Comme vous nous aimons Dieu par-dessus tout
Et nous aimons la France
[…]
Jeanne d'Arc priez pour nous
Grandissez-nous, sauvez la France.
Lord, God first served,
Saint Joan of Arc, our beloved patroness,
[...]

As you loved God above all,
And we love France,
[...]
Joan of Arc, pray for us,
Raise us, save France.

Since Francisco Amorós, who published a work in 1818 that compiled the most suitable pieces for this purpose, collective singing has been associated with gymnastics as a genuine respiratory exercise, also functioning as a moral formation through the selection of texts. Analogous to the male sections of the FGSPF, this Amorósian tradition continues to mandate the use of a federal song that accompanies each movement in competition. The following is the chorus:

C'est le sport qui fera la race Encore plus belle et plus vivace Par lui nous pouvons devenir L'honneur, le soutien, l'avenir Si notre beau pays de France; A mis en nous son espérance Demandons au sport la beauté La force, l'entrain, la santé.	It’s a sport that will make the race Even more beautiful and more vibrant, Through it, we can become Honor, support, and the future. If our beautiful country of France; Has placed its hope in us, Let us ask sport for beauty, Strength, enthusiasm, and health.

Following the Second World War, the song transformed with the merger of the two entities, resulting in the predominance of the male-only song. This shift aligns with the national priorities of the interwar period, during which the RSF encouraged its members to contribute to the restoration of France in the aftermath of the Great War's demographic upheaval. This emphasis is further reflected in the federal directives, (Note: Tranvouez 1999, p. 239) often referred to as the ten commandments of RSF, three of which are particularly noteworthy in this context.

Tu transmettras à tes enfants ta santé physique et morale […] Tu aimes le stade ; préfère-lui ta maison […] Tu es fille de France. La France compte sur toi.	You shall pass on your physical and moral health to your children […] You love the stadium; prefer it to your home […] You are a daughter of France. France counts on you.

=== Instructors of the RSF ===
Despite its present-day obsolescence, the discourse in question was aligned with the prevailing concerns of its era. Various oral sources ascribe its authorship to Marie-Thérèse Eyquem, and its dissemination was spearheaded by militant technical leaders whose training constituted the RSF's paramount objective. The inaugural instructors trained by Félix Mathey were affiliated with the Children of Mary, a group characterized by their unwavering devotion to the Virgin and Joan of Arc, as well as to God and France. For these individuals, the RSF embodied a dual identity as both a familial bond and a spiritual mission, often entailing a celibacy that was chosen and accepted by its members, particularly those serving as instructors within the association. While their involvement in the associations was initially voluntary, the demands of teaching often led to their employment in private educational institutions. Those who demonstrated exceptional dynamism and competence often ascended to the role of federal instructors: Notable figures such as Olga Batany, (Note: Jouaret 2012, p. 166) (Note: Olga Batany, also known for her talents as a poet, passed away in September 2013 at the age of 96.) Eugénie Duisit, Geneviève, and Marie-Thérèse Eyquem embarked on extensive travels throughout France and beyond, delivering intensive two-week training courses.

The RSF's commitment to the technical and pedagogical training of its members was already evident before the 1936 paid holidays, which provided young female workers with the necessary time to engage in this training. In Paris, this training was structured into weekly courses, while correspondence courses were established for the provinces. These programs, which prepared RSF members for state diplomas, enabled them to excel in public service recruitment exams, achieving an impressive success rate of over 80% in 1938. (Note: Tranvouez 1999, p. 232) This initiative by the Children of Mary signified a substantial investment in establishing a novel profession and fortifying the French Republic's educational institutions. In this domain, the RSF and the Daughters of Charity played a pivotal role in fulfilling Pope Pius XI's aspiration to witness the adaptation of Catholicism to the modern era.

Following the Occupation, all RSF leaders found their place in the new structures of the FSF, contributing greatly to its expansion. The women demonstrated an ability to resist the paternalistic pressures of the male leaders (Note: Jouaret 2012, p. 243) while maintaining their independence by being firm and exemplary in difficult situations. They also benefited from a more serene environment. Before the Fifth Republic, the Berthoin reform, and the widespread adoption of co-education, female youth associations were primarily under the oversight of nuns, who were less receptive to the speeches of the Workers' Mission. Consequently, they did not face the same challenges regarding the rise of Catholic Action and the Young Christian Workers as their male counterparts. (Note: Tranvouez 1999, p. 337) In 2012, as heirs to the RSF, women represented the majority of the licenses of the FSCF and were responsible for the majority of the hundred or so training courses scheduled for the 2012-2013 calendar, except the BAFA (French Youth Workers' Training Certificate) and BAFD (French Youth Leaders' Certificate). For the discipline of women's artistic gymnastics alone, there were 10 introductory courses, 13 for first-degree coaches, 4 for second-degree, 1 for third-degree, and 4 for advanced training.

== Rayon Sportif in the 21st century ==
Despite the term Rayon sportif féminin no longer being utilized at the federal level of the FSCF, it remains quite prevalent at the local level, with numerous associations maintaining the name and memory. Examples include associations in Candé, Château-Renault, Chaumont, Cognac, Le Lion d'Angers, Saint-Dizier, and Thouarcé.

== See also ==
- Women's sports
- Sport in France
- Marie-Thérèse Eyquem

== Bibliography ==
- Barrull, Raymond (1984). Les étapes de la gymnastique au sol et aux agrès en France et dans le monde [The stages of floor and apparatus gymnastics in France and around the world] (in French). Paris: French Gymnastics Federation. ISBN 978-2-9500603-0-3.
- Groeninger, Fabien (2004). Sport, religion et nation, la fédération des patronages d'une guerre mondiale à l'autre [Sport, religion and nation, the federation of patronages from one world war to the next] (in French). Paris: L'Harmattan. ISBN 2-7475-6950-0.
- Hervet, Robert (1948). La FSF de 1898 à 1948 [The FSF from 1898 to 1948] (in French). Paris. OCLC 66302325.
- Jouaret, Jean-Marie (1999). Petite histoire partielle et partiale de la Fédération Sportive et Culturelle de France (1948-1998) [A partial history of the Fédération Sportive et Culturelle de France (1948-1998)] (in French). Vol. 2. Paris: FSCF. ISBN 978-2-9528387-0-2.
- Jouaret, Jean-Marie (2012). La fédération des sections sportives des patronages catholiques de France (1898-1998) [The federation of Catholic patronage sports sections in France (1898-1998)] (in French). Paris: L'Harmattan. ISBN 978-2-296-55969-1.
- Munoz, Laurence (2005). Le Rayon sportif féminin, de l'éducation physique aux sports (1937-1967) [Le Rayon sportif féminin, from physical education to sports (1937-1967)]. Espaces et temps du sport (in French). Paris: L'Harmattan. ISBN 978-2-296-55969-1.
- Piard, Claude (2001). Éducation physique et sport : Petit manuel d'histoire élémentaire [Physical education and sport: A short elementary history manual]. Espaces et temps du sport (in French). Paris: L'Harmattan. ISBN 2-7475-1744-6.
- Terret, Thierry (2005). Sport et genre : [actes du 11e Carrefour d'histoire du sport organisé à Lyon du 28 au 30 octobre 2004] [Sport and gender: [proceedings of the 11th Carrefour d'histoire du sport organized in Lyon from October 28 to 30, 2004]] (in French). Paris: L'Harmattan. ISBN 2-7475-9564-1.
- Tranvouez, Yvon (1999). Sport, culture et religion : les patronages catholiques [Sport, culture and religion: Catholic patronages] (in French). Brest: UBO. pp. 227–243. ISBN 2-901737-39-0.
- Chéné, Yves (2008). Union d'Anjou FSCF : D'hier à aujourd'hui, 100 ans de vie associative depuis les patronages (1907-2007) [Union d'Anjou FSCF: From yesterday to today, 100 years of associative life since the patronages (1907-2007)] (in French). Angers: Association Écrits et Mémoires. ISBN 978-2-914787-32-1.
- Castan Vicente, Florys (2009). Marie-Thérèse Eyquem : Du sport à la politique, parcours d'une féministe [Marie-Thérèse Eyquem: From sport to politics, a feminist's journey] (in French). Paris: l'OURS. ISBN 978-2-91151-801-0.

=== Other sources ===
- "Fédération sportive et culturelle de France (FSCF) 1898-2002 et du Rayon sportif féminin (RSF) 1936-1984" [French Sports and Cultural Federation (FSCF) 1898-2002 and the Women's Sports Department (RSF) 1936-1984] (PDF). Archives nationales du monde du travail (in French). September 2007. Archived from the original (PDF) on March 4, 2016.
  - Deposit of the archives of the Fédération sportive et culturelle de France at the Archives nationales du monde du travail, within the Pôle national des archives du monde sportif and as part of the MéMoS (mémoire du sport) program.
