= Marie-Thérèse Eyquem =

French politician (1913–1978)

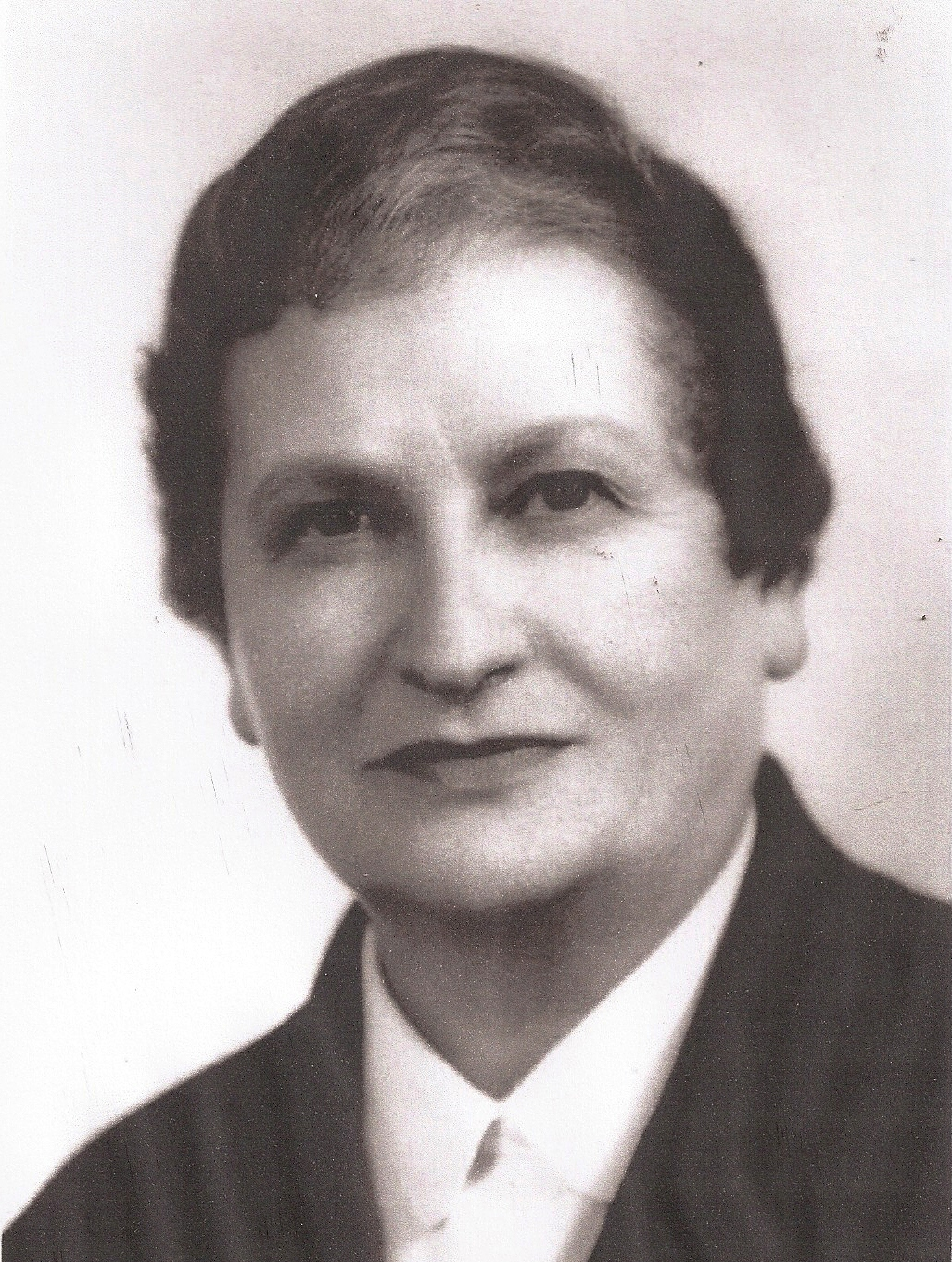
- Born: 6 September 1913; La Teste-de-Buch, France
- Died: 8 August 1978 (aged 64); Moustier-Ventadour, France

Marie-Thérèse Eyquem (6 September 1913 – 8 August 1978) was a French feminist, politician, and author. Under the Vichy regime, she participated in the ban against multiple women's sports including association football. In the 1960s, she became more involved in politics and joined the French Socialist Party.

== Early life ==
Marie-Thérèse Eyquem was born to baker and insurance employee Robert Eyquem and teacher Louise Eyquem (née Bisserié) on 6 September 1913 in La Teste-de-Buch, Gironde, France. She moved to Paris with her family in 1924. In 1927, she began work while continuing to receive education by correspondence.

== Vichy France ==
Eyquem was appointed to the General Commission of Physical Education and Sports of Vichy France on 17 August 1940 as the director of women's sports, serving under General Commissioner Jean Borotra. She applied the Vichy government's Révolution nationale policy to sports, critical of sportswomen who transgressed the traditional norms of femininity. On 27 March 1941, she announced a ban against women's participation in many sports including association football, rugby, boxing, wrestling, and cycling.

After the merger of the Rayon Sportif Féminin and the Gymnastic and Sports Federation of French Patronages (FGSPF), Eyquem was chosen as assistant by the organization's head Armand Thibaudeau. She accompanied Thibaudeau on his visits across France, and contributed to the integration of women into the FGSPF. With FGSPF general instructor Olga Batany, Eyquem organized a "Festival of the Sportswoman" in Paris in 1941 and another on 5 July 1942; the latter gathered 20,000 spectators and between 4,000 and 5,000 participants.

Eyquem's doctrine of better training of girls in non-mixed groups conflicted with Borotra's decisions, which placed women's sports governing bodies under the supervision of men's governing bodies.

In 1942, Colonel Joseph Pascot replaced Jean Borotra. Eyquem was then promoted to deputy head of the General Commission of Physical Education and Sports and was no longer free to develop her projects. Pascot was less interested in women's sports than his predecessor, though the number of sportswomen increased during his office.

== Sports after Vichy ==
After the liberation of France, Eyquem was not prosecuted for her position in the Vichy government as sport was considered to be apolitical. She was appointed as inspector of women's sports by the new government, and retained her volunteer position at the FGSPF. Several years after Eyquem's death, her later colleague Yvette Roudy stated that "it was [Eyquem] who taught me the difference between political engagement and duty to the state: as a sports official she considered herself to serve the state rather than the regime." ("C'est elle [Eyquem] qui m'a appris la différence entre l'engagement politique par rapport au devoir d'État : haut fonctionnaire des sports, elle considérait qu'elle servait l'État et pas le régime.")

In 1947 in Prague, Eyquem was appointed as the president of the first female committee of the Fédération internationale catholique d'éducation physique et sportive (FICEP). She continued her role in the FGSPF in its successor organization, the Fédération sportive de France (FSF), and accompanied its ecclesiastical advisor Jean Wolff to the congress of the lay apostolate from 7 to 14 October 1951. Eyquem was dismissed from the FSF in 1956 due to a lifestyle deemed "scandalous" by the organization's new director; she also lost her position at the FICEP. Her ambition to become the first woman appointed to the International Olympic Committee did not succeed, with the first female member being appointed in 1981.

Eyquem was promoted to the position of head inspector of the Ministry of Sports in 1961, and in 1963 was appointed as a Knight of the Legion of Honour.

== Feminism and socialism ==
Eyquem co-founded the Mouvement démocratique féminin (MDF), France's first postwar feminist movement, in 1962. The organization grew to include many women of France's non-Communist left wing. She pushed for women's rights, including the legalization of contraception and equality for workers, and became François Mitterrand's friend and advisor on matters on women's rights; contraception was legalized on 28 December 1967.

The MDF came to associate directly with the main French left, and participated in the founding of Mitterrand's Convention of Republican Institutions (CIR). Eyquem joined the CIR and later the Federation of the Democratic and Socialist Left. She was the only woman in a leading position in these parties. After the protests of May 1968, the MDF was challenged by the new and more radical Mouvement de libération des femmes, which Eyquem refused to join; the MDF was disestablished and many of its members joined the new Socialist Party.

In 1973, Eyquem proposed that a minimum of 10% of electoral candidates of the Socialist Party must be women; this proposal was passed on 25 March 1974. At the same time, she organized conferences and debates regarding the intersection between socialism and Christianity. In 1975, she was appointed a national secretary of the Socialist Party, in charge of relations with associated organizations.

Marie-Thérèse Eyquem died of cancer on 8 August 1978 in her home in Moustier-Ventadour, Corrèze. Her funeral was attended by François Mitterrand and his family. She was posthumously awarded the Silver Olympic Order in 1983.
