= List of gymnasts at the 2000 Summer Olympics =

This is a list of the gymnasts who represented their country at the 2000 Summer Olympics in Sydney from 15 September to 1 October 2000. Gymnasts across three disciplines (artistic gymnastics, rhythmic gymnastics, and trampoline) participated in the Games.

== Women's artistic gymnastics ==
	Name	Country	Date of birth (Age)
Youngest competitor	Laura Trefiletti	Italy	31 December 1984 (aged 15)
Oldest competitor	Oksana Chusovitina	Uzbekistan	19 June 1975 (aged 25)

NOC	Name	Date of birth (Age)	Hometown
Argentina	Melina Sirolli	13 April 1984 (aged 16)	Buenos Aires, Argentina
Australia	Melinda Cleland	15 October 1984 (aged 15)	Frankston, Victoria
Australia	Alexandra Croak	9 July 1984 (aged 16)	Coffs Harbour, New South Wales
Australia	Trudy McIntosh	30 July 1984 (aged 16)	Geelong, Victoria
Australia	Lisa Skinner	17 February 1981 (aged 19)	Clear Mountain, Queensland
Australia	Allana Slater	3 April 1984 (aged 16)	Mount Claremont, Western Australia
Australia	Brooke Walker	26 February 1982 (aged 18)	Frankston, Victoria
Belarus	Tatyana Grigorenko	1 September 1984 (aged 16)	Grodno, Belarus
Belarus	Anna Meysak	16 April 1984 (aged 16)	Grodno, Belarus
Belarus	Nataliya Naranovich	1 August 1981 (aged 19)	Minsk, Belarus
Belarus	Alena Polozkova	11 August 1979 (aged 21)	Mogilev, Belarus
Belarus	Marina Zarzhitskaya	20 December 1981 (aged 18)	
Belarus	Tatyana Zharganova	24 July 1980 (aged 20)	Grodno, Belarus
Belgium	Sigrid Persoon	12 March 1983 (aged 17)	Dendermonde, Belgium
Brazil	Camila Comin	31 March 1983 (aged 17)	São Paulo, Brazil
Brazil	Daniele Hypólito	8 September 1984 (aged 16)	Santo André, Brazil
Canada	Julie Beaulieu	28 April 1983 (aged 17)	Montreal, Quebec
Canada	Michelle Conway	24 November 1983 (aged 16)	Toronto, Ontario
Canada	Crystal Gilmore	8 April 1983 (aged 17)	Cambridge, Ontario
Canada	Lise Leveille	14 April 1982 (aged 18)	Burnaby, British Columbia
Canada	Kate Richardson	27 June 1984 (aged 16)	Coquitlam, British Columbia
Canada	Yvonne Tousek	23 February 1980 (aged 20)	Kitchener, Ontario
China	Dong Fangxiao	23 January 1986 (aged 14)^{[Note 1]}	Tangshan, Hebei
China	Huang Mandan	17 February 1983 (aged 17)	Shanwei, Guangdong
China	Kui Yuanyuan	23 June 1981 (aged 19)	Xicheng District, Beijing
China	Ling Jie	22 October 1982 (aged 17)	Hengyang, Hunan
China	Liu Xuan	12 August 1979 (aged 21)	Changsha, Hunan
China	Yang Yun	2 March 1984 (aged 16)	Zhenjiang, Jiangsu
Czech Republic	Jana Komrsková	6 May 1983 (aged 17)	Roudnice nad Labem, Czech Republic
Czech Republic	Kateřina Marešová	27 January 1984 (aged 16)	Brno, Czech Republic
France	Anne-Sophie Endeler	5 May 1984 (aged 16)	Le Port, Réunion
France	Ludivine Furnon	4 October 1980 (aged 19)	Nîmes, France
France	Nelly Ramassamy	4 December 1983 (aged 16)	Saint-Louis, Réunion
France	Delphine Regease	20 February 1984 (aged 16)	Lagny, France
France	Alexandra Soler	14 October 1983 (aged 16)	Béziers, France
France	Elvire Teza	29 March 1981 (aged 19)	Saint-Denis, Réunion
Great Britain	Kelly Hackman	10 December 1980 (aged 19)	Watford, England
Great Britain	Lisa Mason	26 February 1982 (aged 18)	Aylesbury, England
Great Britain	Sharna Murray	23 June 1981 (aged 19)	Hastings, England
Great Britain	Annika Reeder	28 September 1979 (aged 20)	Epping, England
Great Britain	Paula Thomas	2 August 1981 (aged 19)	Harlow, England
Great Britain	Emma Williams	9 July 1983 (aged 17)	Liverpool, England
Greece	Aikaterini Christoforidou	4 April 1984 (aged 16)	Thessaloniki, Greece
Greece	Vasiliki Millousi	4 May 1984 (aged 16)	Athens, Greece
Hungary	Adrienn Nyeste	14 December 1978 (aged 21)	Mezőhegyes, Hungary
Italy	Monica Bergamelli	24 May 1984 (aged 16)	Alzano Lombardo, Italy
Italy	Martina Bremini	29 December 1982 (aged 17)	Trieste, Italy
Italy	Alice Capitani	27 October 1984 (aged 15)	Rome, Italy
Italy	Irene Castelli	4 November 1983 (aged 16)	Ponte San Pietro, Italy
Italy	Adriana Crisci	24 July 1982 (aged 18)	Eitorf, Germany
Italy	Laura Trefiletti	31 December 1984 (aged 15)	Milan, Italy
Japan	Miho Takenaka	22 October 1984 (aged 15)	Aichi Prefecture, Japan
Japan	Kana Yamawaki	1 September 1984 (aged 16)	Gifu Prefecture, Japan
Kazakhstan	Irina Yevdokimova	14 August 1978 (aged 22)	Almaty, Kazakhstan
Lithuania	Julija Kovaliova	20 December 1980 (aged 19)	Vilnius, Lithuania
Malaysia	Yen Au Li	1 April 1982 (aged 18)	
Mexico	Denisse López	8 December 1976 (aged 23)	Mexicali, Baja California
Namibia	Gharde Geldenhuys	15 September 1981 (aged 19)	Swakopmund, Namibia
New Zealand	Laura Robertson	17 January 1982 (aged 18)	Bay of Islands, New Zealand
North Korea	Mok Un-ju	29 March 1981 (aged 19)	
North Korea	Son Un-hui	13 December 1981 (aged 18)	
Poland	Joanna Skowrońska	1 July 1982 (aged 18)	Kamienna Góra, Poland
Romania	Simona Amânar	7 October 1979 (aged 20)	Constanța, Romania
Romania	Loredana Boboc	12 May 1984 (aged 16)	Bucharest, Romania
Romania	Andreea Isărescu	3 July 1984 (aged 16)	Bucharest, Romania
Romania	Maria Olaru	4 June 1982 (aged 18)	Fălticeni, Romania
Romania	Claudia Presăcan	28 December 1979 (aged 20)	Sibiu, Romania
Romania	Andreea Răducan	30 September 1983 (aged 16)	Bârlad, Romania
Russia	Anna Chepeleva	26 June 1984 (aged 16)	Volzhsky, Russia
Russia	Svetlana Khorkina	19 January 1979 (aged 21)	Belgorod, Russia
Russia	Anastasia Kolesnikova	3 June 1984 (aged 16)	Kazan, Russia
Russia	Ekaterina Lobaznyuk	10 July 1983 (aged 17)	Fergana, Uzbekistan
Russia	Elena Produnova	15 February 1980 (aged 20)	Rostov-on-Don, Russia
Russia	Elena Zamolodchikova	19 September 1982 (aged 17)	Moscow, Russia
Slovakia	Zuzana Sekerová	25 September 1984 (aged 15)	Trnava, Slovakia
Slovenia	Mojca Mavrič	8 October 1980 (aged 19)	Ljubljana, Slovenia
South Korea	Choi Mi-seon	30 March 1980 (aged 20)	Yongin, South Korea
Spain	Marta Cusidó	27 February 1983 (aged 17)	Barcelona, Spain
Spain	Susana García	8 January 1982 (aged 18)	Barcelona, Spain
Spain	Laura Martínez	1 August 1984 (aged 16)	Barcelona, Spain
Spain	Paloma Moro	18 June 1982 (aged 18)	Madrid, Spain
Spain	Sara Moro	11 May 1984 (aged 16)	Guadalajara, Mexico
Spain	Esther Moya	31 July 1984 (aged 16)	Vilanova i la Geltrú, Spain
Ukraine	Viktoria Karpenko	15 March 1981 (aged 19)	Kherson, Ukraine
Ukraine	Alona Kvasha	5 November 1984 (aged 15)	Cherkasy, Ukraine
Ukraine	Olha Rozshchupkina	26 March 1984 (aged 16)	Zaporizhzhia, Ukraine
Ukraine	Olha Teslenko	23 May 1981 (aged 19)	Kropyvnytskyi, Ukraine
Ukraine	Halina Tyryk	30 March 1980 (aged 20)	Lviv, Ukraine
Ukraine	Tetiana Yarosh	1 September 1984 (aged 16)	Kropyvnytskyi, Ukraine
United States	Amy Chow	15 May 1978 (aged 22)	San Jose, California
United States	Jamie Dantzscher	2 May 1982 (aged 18)	San Dimas, California
United States	Dominique Dawes	20 November 1976 (aged 23)	Silver Spring, Maryland
United States	Kristen Maloney	10 March 1981 (aged 19)	Pen Argyl, Pennsylvania
United States	Elise Ray	6 February 1982 (aged 18)	Columbia, Maryland
United States	Tasha Schwikert	21 November 1984 (aged 15)	Las Vegas, Nevada
Uzbekistan	Oksana Chusovitina	19 June 1975 (aged 25)	Bukhara, Uzbekistan
Venezuela	Arlen Lovera	24 September 1984 (aged 15)	Caracas, Venezuela

^{1} China entered Dong Fangxiao into the 2000 Olympics under a birth date of 20 January 1983, which would have made her 17. However, when she obtained accreditation to work as a technical official at the Beijing Olympics eight years later, she gave her birth date as 23 January 1986, which would have made her 14 and too young to compete. In 2010, the International Gymnastics Federation concluded that Dong had been born in 1986 and revoked the bronze medal she won with the Chinese team in Sydney.

== Men's artistic gymnastics ==
	Name	Country	Date of birth (Age)
Youngest competitors	Morgan HammPaul Hamm	United States	24 September 1982 (aged 17)
Oldest competitor	Marius Tobă	Germany	9 January 1968 (aged 32)

NOC	Name	Date of birth (Age)	Hometown
Australia	Damian Istria	24 August 1982 (aged 18)	Brisbane, Queensland
Australia	Philippe Rizzo	9 February 1981 (aged 19)	Sydney, New South Wales
Belarus	Ivan Ivankov	10 April 1975 (aged 25)	Minsk, Belarus
Belarus	Aleksandr Kruzhilov	28 December 1980 (aged 19)	Zaporizhzhia, Ukraine
Belarus	Ivan Pavlovsky	2 December 1976 (aged 23)	Grodno, Belarus
Belarus	Vitaly Rudnitsky	29 November 1974 (aged 25)	Mogilev, Belarus
Belarus	Aleksandr Shostak	1 March 1974 (aged 26)	Minsk, Belarus
Belarus	Aleksey Sinkevich	10 June 1977 (aged 23)	Vitebsk, Belarus
Bulgaria	Khristian Ivanov	24 January 1977 (aged 23)	Sofia, Bulgaria
Bulgaria	Dimitar Lunchev	22 June 1977 (aged 23)	Ruse, Bulgaria
Bulgaria	Mladen Stefanov	15 September 1977 (aged 23)	Popovo, Bulgaria
Bulgaria	Vasil Vetsev	21 January 1974 (aged 26)	Sofia, Bulgaria
Bulgaria	Deyan Yordanov	21 July 1976 (aged 24)	Ruse, Bulgaria
Bulgaria	Yordan Yovchev	24 February 1973 (aged 27)	Plovdiv, Bulgaria
Canada	Alexander Jeltkov	25 February 1978 (aged 22)	Tbilisi, Georgia
Canada	Kyle Shewfelt	6 May 1982 (aged 18)	Calgary, Alberta
China	Huang Xu	4 February 1979 (aged 21)	Nantong, Jiangsu
China	Li Xiaopeng	27 July 1981 (aged 19)	Changsha, Hunan
China	Xiao Junfeng	12 July 1979 (aged 21)	Xi'an, Shaanxi
China	Xing Aowei	15 February 1982 (aged 18)	Yantai, Shandong
China	Yang Wei	8 February 1980 (aged 20)	Xiantao, Hubei
China	Zheng Lihui	4 May 1978 (aged 22)	Xiantao, Hubei
Chinese Taipei	Lin Yung-Hsi	26 March 1979 (aged 21)	
Cuba	Lázaro Lamelas	1 August 1974 (aged 26)	Havana, Cuba
Cuba	Erick López	29 December 1972 (aged 27)	Havana, Cuba
Egypt	Raouf Abdelraouf	23 January 1978 (aged 22)	Cairo, Egypt
France	Éric Casimir	20 February 1977 (aged 23)	Le Port, Réunion
France	Yann Cucherat	2 October 1979 (aged 20)	Lyon, France
France	Dimitri Karbanenko	19 July 1973 (aged 27)	Kaliningrad, Russia
France	Florent Marée	17 November 1980 (aged 19)	Saint-Louis, Réunion
France	Éric Poujade	8 August 1972 (aged 28)	Aix-en-Provence, France
France	Benjamin Varonian	15 June 1980 (aged 20)	Nice, France
Georgia	Ilia Giorgadze	12 January 1978 (aged 22)	Kutaisi, Georgia
Germany	Jan-Peter Nikiferow	8 November 1971 (aged 28)	Magdeburg, Germany
Germany	Dimitrij Nonin	5 April 1979 (aged 21)	Dnipro, Ukraine
Germany	Sergej Pfeifer	20 February 1977 (aged 23)	Dushanbe, Tajikistan
Germany	Marius Tobă	9 January 1968 (aged 32)	Reșița, Romania
Germany	Rene Tschernitschek	30 March 1977 (aged 23)	Halle, Germany
Germany	Andreas Wecker	2 January 1970 (aged 30)	Staßfurt, Germany
Great Britain	Craig Heap	10 July 1973 (aged 27)	Burnley, England
Greece	Ioannis Melissanidis	27 March 1977 (aged 23)	Dachau, Germany
Greece	Dimosthenis Tampakos	12 November 1976 (aged 23)	Thessaloniki, Greece
Hungary	Szilveszter Csollány	13 April 1970 (aged 30)	Sopron, Hungary
Hungary	Zoltán Supola	25 September 1970 (aged 29)	Dunaújváros, Hungary
Iceland	Rúnar Alexandersson	28 March 1977 (aged 23)	Smolensk, Russia
Italy	Alberto Busnari	4 October 1978 (aged 21)	Melzo, Italy
Italy	Igor Cassina	15 August 1977 (aged 23)	Seregno, Italy
Japan	Kenichi Fujita	14 April 1975 (aged 25)	Osaka, Japan
Japan	Mutsumi Harada	24 September 1975 (aged 24)	Kyoto, Japan
Japan	Norimasa Iwai	12 March 1973 (aged 27)	Matsumoto, Japan
Japan	Akihiro Kasamatsu	22 July 1976 (aged 24)	Mie Prefecture, Japan
Japan	Yoshihiro Saito	29 August 1976 (aged 24)	Kyoto, Japan
Japan	Naoya Tsukahara	25 June 1977 (aged 23)	Nagasaki, Japan
Kazakhstan	Sergey Fedorchenko	18 September 1974 (aged 25)	Almaty, Kazakhstan
Latvia	Igors Vihrovs	6 June 1978 (aged 22)	Riga, Latvia
New Zealand	David Phillips	28 October 1977 (aged 22)	Pukekohe, New Zealand
North Korea	Pae Gil-su	4 March 1972 (aged 28)	
Norway	Flemming Solberg	20 August 1973 (aged 27)	Drammen, Norway
Poland	Leszek Blanik	1 March 1977 (aged 23)	Wodzisław Śląski, Poland
Puerto Rico	Diego Lizardi	9 October 1975 (aged 24)	San Juan, Puerto Rico
Romania	Marian Drăgulescu	18 December 1980 (aged 19)	Bucharest, Romania
Romania	Rareș Orzața	16 February 1977 (aged 23)	Brașov, Romania
Romania	Florentin Pescaru	25 March 1977 (aged 23)	Caracal, Romania
Romania	Dorin Petcu	10 April 1976 (aged 24)	
Romania	Ioan Silviu Suciu	24 November 1977 (aged 22)	Sibiu, Romania
Romania	Marius Urzică	30 September 1975 (aged 24)	Toplița, Romania
Russia	Maxim Aleshin	7 May 1979 (aged 21)	Ulyanovsk, Russia
Russia	Aleksei Bondarenko	23 August 1978 (aged 22)	Kostanay, Kazakhstan
Russia	Dmitri Drevin	10 January 1982 (aged 18)	Cheboksary, Russia
Russia	Nikolai Kryukov	11 November 1978 (aged 21)	Voronezh, Russia
Russia	Aleksei Nemov	28 May 1976 (aged 24)	Barashevo, Russia
Russia	Yevgeni Podgorny	9 July 1977 (aged 23)	Novosibirsk, Russia
Slovenia	Mitja Petkovšek	6 February 1977 (aged 23)	Ljubljana, Slovenia
South Korea	Jo Seong-min	5 January 1976 (aged 24)	Jeollabuk, South Korea
South Korea	Jeong Jin-soo	15 August 1972 (aged 28)	
South Korea	Kim Dong-hwa	21 March 1976 (aged 24)	
South Korea	Lee Jang-hyeong	16 August 1974 (aged 26)	Daegu, South Korea
South Korea	Lee Joo-hyung	5 March 1973 (aged 27)	
South Korea	Yeo Hong-chul	28 May 1971 (aged 29)	Gwangju, South Korea
Spain	Alejandro Barrenechea	30 March 1976 (aged 24)	Bilbao, Spain
Spain	Víctor Cano	10 February 1978 (aged 22)	Barcelona, Spain
Spain	Saúl Cofiño	12 July 1978 (aged 22)	Barcelona, Spain
Spain	Omar Cortés	14 June 1977 (aged 23)	Madrid, Spain
Spain	Gervasio Deferr	7 November 1980 (aged 19)	Barcelona, Spain
Spain	Andreu Vivó	3 February 1978 (aged 22)	Manresa, Spain
Switzerland	Dieter Rehm	29 January 1974 (aged 26)	Zürich, Switzerland
Ukraine	Oleksandr Beresch	12 October 1977 (aged 22)	Pervomaisk, Ukraine
Ukraine	Valeriy Honcharov	19 September 1977 (aged 22)	Kharkiv, Ukraine
Ukraine	Ruslan Mezentsev	24 June 1981 (aged 19)	Kropyvnytskyi, Ukraine
Ukraine	Valeriy Pereshkura	20 September 1977 (aged 22)	Krasnoyarsk, Russia
Ukraine	Oleksandr Svitlychniy	23 August 1972 (aged 28)	Kharkiv, Ukraine
Ukraine	Roman Zozulya	22 June 1979 (aged 21)	Zaporizhzhia, Ukraine
United States	Morgan Hamm	24 September 1982 (aged 17)	Ashland, Wisconsin
United States	Paul Hamm	24 September 1982 (aged 17)	Ashland, Wisconsin
United States	Stephen McCain	9 January 1974 (aged 26)	Houston, Texas
United States	John Roethlisberger	21 June 1970 (aged 30)	Fort Atkinson, Wisconsin
United States	Sean Townsend	20 January 1979 (aged 21)	Temple, Texas
United States	Blaine Wilson	3 August 1974 (aged 26)	Columbus, Ohio

== Rhythmic gymnasts ==
=== Individual ===
	Name	Country	Date of birth (Age)
Youngest competitor	Evmorfia Dona	Greece	23 August 1984 (aged 16)
Oldest competitor	Olena Vitrychenko	Ukraine	25 November 1976 (aged 23)

NOC	Name	Date of birth (age)	Hometown
Australia	Dani Le Ray	6 November 1982 (aged 17)	Sydney, New South Wales
Belarus	Yulia Raskina	9 April 1982 (aged 18)	Minsk, Belarus
Belarus	Valeria Vatkina	28 March 1981 (aged 19)	Minsk, Belarus
Bulgaria	Iva Tepeshanova	19 February 1983 (aged 17)	Sofia, Bulgaria
Canada	Emilie Livingston	4 January 1983 (aged 17)	Etobicoke, Ontario
China	Zhou Xiaojing	10 August 1977 (aged 23)	Rui'an, Zhejiang
Egypt	Sherin Taama	26 May 1982 (aged 18)	Alexandria, Egypt
Finland	Heini Lautala	28 August 1977 (aged 23)	Vehkalahti, Finland
France	Eva Serrano	24 April 1978 (aged 22)	Nîmes, France
Georgia	Inga Tavdishvili	20 July 1982 (aged 18)	Rustavi, Georgia
Germany	Lena Asmus	5 May 1982 (aged 18)	Omsk, Russia
Germany	Edita Schaufler	11 July 1980 (aged 20)	Bishkek, Kyrgyzstan
Greece	Evmorfia Dona	23 August 1984 (aged 16)	Grevena, Greece
Hungary	Viktória Fráter	30 August 1977 (aged 23)	Budapest, Hungary
Israel	Svetlana Tokayev	9 November 1979 (aged 20)	
Italy	Susanna Marchesi	13 March 1980 (aged 20)	Arezzo, Italy
Japan	Rieko Matsunaga	19 May 1979 (aged 21)	Tokyo, Japan
Poland	Agnieszka Brandebura	16 April 1981 (aged 19)	Łódź, Poland
Russia	Yulia Barsukova	31 December 1978 (aged 21)	Moscow, Russia
Russia	Alina Kabaeva	12 May 1983 (aged 17)	Tashkent, Uzbekistan
Spain	Almudena Cid	15 June 1980 (aged 20)	Vitoria-Gasteiz, Spain
Spain	Esther Domínguez	23 April 1981 (aged 19)	Zaragoza, Spain
Ukraine	Olena Vitrychenko	25 November 1976 (aged 23)	Odesa, Ukraine
Ukraine	Tamara Yerofeeva	4 March 1982 (aged 18)	Kyiv, Ukraine

=== Group ===
	Name	Country	Date of birth (Age)
Youngest competitor	Eleonora Kezhova	Bulgaria	28 December 1985 (aged 14)
Oldest competitor	Alessandra Ferezin	Brazil	7 April 1976 (aged 24)

NOC	Name	Date of birth (Age)	Hometown
Belarus	Tatyana Ananko	26 June 1984 (aged 16)	Minsk, Belarus
Belarus	Tatyana Belan	10 November 1982 (aged 17)	Minsk, Belarus
Belarus	Anna Glazkova	29 July 1981 (aged 19)	Salihorsk, Belarus
Belarus	Irina Ilyenkova	10 April 1980 (aged 20)	Minsk, Belarus
Belarus	Maria Lazuk	15 October 1983 (aged 16)	Minsk, Belarus
Belarus	Olga Puzhevich	17 March 1983 (aged 17)	
Brazil	Dayane Camilo	15 December 1977 (aged 22)	Londrina, Brazil
Brazil	Flávia de Faria	29 January 1982 (aged 18)	Brasília, Brazil
Brazil	Alessandra Ferezin	7 April 1976 (aged 24)	Londrina, Brazil
Brazil	Camila Ferezin	18 April 1977 (aged 23)	Londrina, Brazil
Brazil	Thalita Nakadomari	11 May 1985 (aged 15)	Londrina, Brazil
Brazil	Natália Scherer	28 October 1985 (aged 14)	Santa Cruz do Sul, Brazil
Bulgaria	Gabriela Atanasova	16 November 1983 (aged 16)	Sofia, Bulgaria
Bulgaria	Zhaneta Ilieva	3 October 1984 (aged 15)	Veliko Tarnovo, Bulgaria
Bulgaria	Proletina Kalcheva	11 December 1979 (aged 20)	Burgas, Bulgaria
Bulgaria	Eleonora Kezhova	28 December 1985 (aged 14)	Sofia, Bulgaria
Bulgaria	Galina Marinova	20 April 1985 (aged 15)	Sofia, Bulgaria
Bulgaria	Kristina Rangelova	24 January 1985 (aged 15)	Sofia, Bulgaria
France	Anne-Sophie Doyen	27 November 1983 (aged 16)	Cambrai, France
France	Anne-Laure Klein	14 November 1983 (aged 16)	Calais, France
France	Anne-Sophie Lavoine	20 June 1981 (aged 19)	Calais, France
France	Laëtitia Mancieri	19 April 1983 (aged 17)	Vincennes, France
France	Magalie Poisson	8 March 1982 (aged 18)	Saint-Cloud, France
France	Vanessa Sauzede	22 August 1982 (aged 18)	Paris, France
Germany	Friederike Arlt	7 September 1984 (aged 16)	Freiberg, Germany
Germany	Susan Benicke	14 September 1981 (aged 19)	Halle, Germany
Germany	Jeanine Fissler	12 October 1980 (aged 19)	Berlin, Germany
Germany	Selma Neuhaus	16 October 1981 (aged 18)	Gütersloh, Germany
Germany	Jessica Schumacher	13 January 1983 (aged 17)	Saarlouis, Germany
Germany	Annika Seibel	30 November 1983 (aged 16)	Daun, Germany
Greece	Eirini Aϊndili	11 March 1983 (aged 17)	Euboea, Greece
Greece	Maria Georgatou	10 May 1984 (aged 16)	Athens, Greece
Greece	Zara Karyami	7 April 1983 (aged 17)	Athens, Greece
Greece	Eva Khristodoulou	27 September 1983 (aged 16)	Athens, Greece
Greece	Charikleia Pantazi	18 March 1985 (aged 15)	Athens, Greece
Greece	Anna Pollatou	8 October 1983 (aged 16)	Cephalonia, Greece
Italy	Elena Amato	5 November 1983 (aged 16)	Como, Italy
Italy	Eva D'Amore	18 September 1981 (aged 18)	Chieti, Italy
Italy	Silvia Gregorini	18 February 1983 (aged 17)	La Spezia, Italy
Italy	Noemi Iezzi	5 November 1982 (aged 17)	Chieti, Italy
Italy	Roberta Lucentini	2 December 1983 (aged 16)	Chieti, Italy
Italy	Arianna Rusca	8 January 1981 (aged 19)	Genoa, Italy
Japan	Ayako Inada	24 July 1982 (aged 18)	Tokyo, Japan
Japan	Yukari Mizobe	27 December 1979 (aged 20)	Oita Prefecture, Japan
Japan	Yukari Murata	9 October 1981 (aged 18)	Hyogo Prefecture, Japan
Japan	Rie Nakashima	21 March 1980 (aged 20)	Fukuoka Prefecture, Japan
Japan	Masami Nakata	28 May 1981 (aged 19)	Hokkaido, Japan
Japan	Madoka Okamori	4 June 1979 (aged 21)	Mie Prefecture, Japan
Russia	Irina Belova	28 December 1980 (aged 19)	Zavolzhye, Russia
Russia	Elena Shalamova	4 July 1982 (aged 18)	Astrakhan, Russia
Russia	Natalia Lavrova	4 August 1984 (aged 16)	Penza, Russia
Russia	Maria Netesova	26 May 1983 (aged 17)	Yekaterinburg, Russia
Russia	Vera Shimanskaya	10 April 1981 (aged 19)	Moscow, Russia
Russia	Irina Zilber	18 November 1983 (aged 16)	Yekaterinburg, Russia
Spain	Igone Arribas	22 July 1983 (aged 17)	Barakaldo, Spain
Spain	Marta Calamonte	30 July 1982 (aged 18)	Mérida, Spain
Spain	Lorena Guréndez	7 May 1981 (aged 19)	Vitoria-Gasteiz, Spain
Spain	Carolina Malchair	31 May 1982 (aged 18)	Marbella, Spain
Spain	Beatriz Nogalez	3 March 1983 (aged 17)	Vitoria-Gasteiz, Spain
Spain	Carmina Verdú	9 April 1983 (aged 17)	Valencia, Spain

== Male trampoline gymnasts ==
	Name	Country	Date of birth (Age)
Youngest competitor	Lee Brearley	United Kingdom	9 June 1980 (aged 20)
Oldest competitor	Alexander Moskalenko	Russia	4 November 1969 (aged 30)

NOC	Name	Date of birth (Age)	Hometown
Algeria	Ali Bourai	5 May 1977 (aged 23)	Algiers, Algeria
Australia	Ji Wallace	23 June 1977 (aged 23)	Lismore, New South Wales
Belarus	Dmitri Poliaroush	20 September 1970 (aged 29)	Berezniki, Russia
Canada	Mathieu Turgeon	2 August 1979 (aged 21)	Pointe-Claire, Quebec
France	David Martin	8 June 1977 (aged 23)	Thiais, France
Germany	Michael Serth	24 June 1975 (aged 25)	Langen, Germany
Great Britain	Lee Brearley	9 June 1980 (aged 20)	Manchester, England
Japan	Daisuke Nakata	2 March 1974 (aged 26)	Mikawa, Japan
Netherlands	Alan Villafuerte	29 June 1977 (aged 23)	San Salvador, El Salvador
Russia	Alexander Moskalenko	4 November 1969 (aged 30)	Pereyaslovskaya, Russia
Switzerland	Markus Wiesner	7 October 1976 (aged 23)	Liestal, Switzerland
Ukraine	Oleksandr Chernonos	10 May 1979 (aged 21)	Kharkiv, Ukraine

== Female trampoline gymnasts ==
	Name	Country	Date of birth (Age)
Youngest competitor	Ekaterina Khilko	Uzbekistan	25 March 1982 (aged 18)
Oldest competitor	Natalia Karpenkova	Belarus	1 February 1970 (aged 30)

NOC	Name	Date of birth (Age)	Hometown
Australia	Robyn Forbes	24 April 1972 (aged 28)	Brisbane, Queensland
Belarus	Natalia Karpenkova	1 February 1970 (aged 30)	
Canada	Karen Cockburn	2 October 1980 (aged 19)	Toronto, Ontario
Czech Republic	Petra Vachníková	29 May 1976 (aged 24)	Vsetín, Czech Republic
Georgia	Rusudan Khoperia	9 September 1972 (aged 28)	Tbilisi, Georgia
Germany	Anna Dogonadze	15 February 1973 (aged 27)	Mtskheta, Georgia
Great Britain	Jaime Moore	16 August 1979 (aged 21)	Northampton, England
Japan	Akiko Furu	18 July 1973 (aged 27)	Kanazawa, Japan
Russia	Irina Karavayeva	18 May 1975 (aged 25)	Krasnodar, Russia
Ukraine	Oksana Tsyhuleva	15 December 1973 (aged 26)	Mykolaiv, Ukraine
United States	Jennifer Parilla	9 January 1981 (aged 19)	Newport Beach, California
Uzbekistan	Ekaterina Khilko	25 March 1982 (aged 18)	Tashkent, Uzbekistan
