= Gymnastics at the 2000 Summer Olympics – Women's rhythmic qualification =

The 2000 Summer Olympics included individual and team women's rhythmic gymnastics events. The gold medal for the team event was won by the Russian team, and that for the individual event by Yulia Barsukova of Russia.

== Individual All-around Qualification ==
=== Final Qualifiers ===
Gymnast	Gymnast	Gymnast	Gymnast	Gymnast
Yulia Raskina; Belarus Qualification: 2	Valeria Vatkina; Belarus Qualification: 6	Eva Serrano; France Qualification: 4	Evmorfia Dona; Greece Qualification: 10	Susanna Marchesi; Italy Qualification: 7
Yulia Barsukova; Russia Qualification: 3	Alina Kabaeva; Russia Qualification: 1	Almudena Cid; Spain Qualification: 9	Elena Vitrichenko; Ukraine Qualification: 5	Tamara Yerofeeva; Ukraine Qualification: 8

=== Preliminaries ===
In total, 24 gymnasts from 19 countries competed in the qualification round. Top 10 gymnasts would advance to final.

Qualification Results

Rank	Gymnast	Nation	Rope (rhythmic gymnastics)	Hoop (rhythmic gymnastics)	Ball (rhythmic gymnastics)	Ribbon (rhythmic gymnastics)	Total	Qual.
1	Alina Kabaeva	Russia	9.916 (1)	9.925 (1)	9.925 (1)	9.925 (1)	39.691	Q
2	Yulia Raskina	Belarus	9.900 (=2)	9.908 (2)	9.908 (2)	9.908 (2)	39.624	Q
3	Yulia Barsukova	Russia	9.900 (=2)	9.900 (3)	9.900 (3)	9.900 (=3)	39.600	Q
4	Eva Serrano	France	9.875 (4)	9.875 (4)	9.833 (5)	9.900 (=3)	39.483	Q
5	Elena Vitrichenko	Ukraine	9.850 (5)	9.800 (5)	9.866 (4)	9.883 (5)	39.399	Q
6	Valeria Vatkina	Belarus	9.750 (7)	9.733 (8)	9.775 (7)	9.800 (6)	39.058	Q
7	Susanna Marchesi	Italy	9.725 (=8)	9.725 (=9)	9.741 (8)	9.733 (8)	38.924	Q
8	Tamara Yerofeeva	Ukraine	9.725 (=8)	9.750 (7)	9.716 (11)	9.708 (=10)	38.899	Q
9	Almudena Cid	Spain	9.691 (11)	9.708 (=11)	9.733 (9)	9.716 (9)	38.848	Q
10	Evmorfia Ntona	Greece	9.675 (12)	9.725 (=9)	9.725 (10)	9.708 (=10)	38.833	Q
11	Esther Dominguez	Spain	9.658 (14)	9.708 (=11)	9.666 (12)	9.700 (12)	38.732	R
12	Edita Schaufler	Germany	9.775 (6)	9.783 (6)	9.366 (22)	9.783 (7)	38.707	R
13	Agnieszka Brandebura	Poland	9.716 (10)	9.470 (22)	9.791 (6)	9.600 (16)	38.577	-
14	Svetlana Tokaeev	Israel	9.666 (13)	9.683 (13)	9.645 (14)	9.575 (=17)	38.569	-
15	Iva Tepeshanova	Bulgaria	9.608 (15)	9.641 (14)	9.658 (13)	9.641 (13)	38.548	-
16	Rieko Matsunaga	Japan	9.541 (19)	9.608 (16)	9.633 (16)	9.620 (15)	38.407	-
17	Helene Asmus	Germany	9.429 (22)	9.616 (15)	9.641 (15)	9.625 (14)	38.311	-
18	Emilie Livingston	Canada	9.525 (20)	9.591 (=18)	9.575 (=17)	9.575 (=17)	38.266	-
19	Dani Le Ray	Australia	9.575 (16)	9.591 (=18)	9.566 (19)	9.483 (21)	38.215	-
20	Viktoria Frater	Hungary	9.566 (17)	9.600 (17)	9.462 (21)	9.533 (20)	38.161	-
21	Inga Tavdishvili	Georgia	9.483 (21)	9.491 (21)	9.558 (20)	9.550 (19)	38.082	-
22	Zhou Xiaojing	China	9.550 (18)	9.516 (20)	9.575 (=17)	9.237 (22)	37.878	-
23	Heini Lautala	Finland	9.404 (23)	9.450 (23)	9.337 (23)	9.141 (=23)	37.332	-
24	Sherin Taama	Egypt	9.241 (24)	9.250 (24)	9.170 (24)	9.141 (=23)	36.802	-

== Group All-around Qualification ==
=== Final Qualifiers ===
Team	Team	Team	Team
Belarus; Tatyana Ananko; Tatyana Belan; Anna Glazkova; Irina Ilyenkova; Maria Lazuk; Olga Puzhevich	Brazil; Dayane Camilo; Flávia de Faria; Alessandra Ferezin; Camila Ferezin; Thalita Nakadomari; Natália Scherer	Bulgaria; Gabriela Atanasova; Zhaneta Ilieva; Proletina Kalcheva; Eleonora Kezhova; Galina Marinova; Kristina Rangelova	Germany; Friederike Arlt; Susan Benicke; Jeanine Fissler; Selma Neuhaus; Jessica Schumacher; Annika Seibel
Preliminaries: 3	Preliminaries: 7	Preliminaries: 6	Preliminaries: 5
Greece; Eirini Aindili; Maria Georgatou; Zara Karyami; Eva Khristodoulou; Kharikleia Pantazi; Anna Polatou	Italy; Elena Amato; Eva D'Amore; Silvia Gregorini; Noemi Iezzi; Roberta Lucentini; Arianna Rusca	Japan; Ayako Inada; Yukari Mizobe; Yukari Murata; Rie Nakashima; Masami Nakata; Madoka Okamori	Russia; Irina Belova; Yelena Chalamova; Natalia Lavrova; Mariya Netesova; Vyera Shimanskaya; Irina Zilber
Preliminaries: 1	Preliminaries: 8	Preliminaries: 4	Preliminaries: 2

=== Team Rosters ===
Team Rosters

Team	Team	Team	Team	Team
Belarus; Tatyana Ananko; Tatyana Belan; Anna Glazkova; Irina Ilyenkova; Maria Lazuk; Olga Puzhevich	Brazil; Dayane Camilo; Flávia de Faria; Alessandra Ferezin; Camila Ferezin; Thalita Nakadomari; Natália Scherer	Bulgaria; Gabriela Atanasova; Zhaneta Ilieva; Proletina Kalcheva; Eleonora Kezhova; Galina Marinova; Kristina Rangelova	France; Anne-Sophie Doyen; Anne-Laure Klein; Anne-Sophie Lavoine; Laetitia Mancieri; Magalie Poisson; Vanessa Sauzede	Germany; Friederike Arlt; Susan Benicke; Jeanine Fissler; Selma Neuhaus; Jessica Schumacher; Annika Seibel
Greece; Eirini Aϊndili; Maria Georgatou; Zara Karyami; Eva Khristodoulou; Kharikleia Pantazi; Anna Polatou	Italy; Elena Amato; Eva D'Amore; Silvia Gregorini; Noemi Iezzi; Roberta Lucentini; Arianna Rusca	Japan; Ayako Inada; Yukari Mizobe; Yukari Murata; Rie Nakashima; Masami Nakata; Madoka Okamori	Russia; Irina Belova; Yelena Chalamova; Natalia Lavrova; Mariya Netesova; Vyera Shimanskaya; Irina Zilber	Spain; Igone Arribas; Marta Calamonte; Lorena Guréndez; Carolina Malchair; Beatriz Nogalez; Carmina Verdú

=== Preliminaries ===
10 teams participated in the Preliminary round, the top eight teams would advance to the final.

Qualification Results

Rank	Team	5	3 + 2	Total	Qual.
1	Greece	19.700 (=1)	19.700 (1)	39.400	Q
2	Russia	19.700 (=1)	19.666 (2)	39.366	Q
3	Belarus	19.700 (=1)	19.616 (3)	39.316	Q
4	Japan	19.500 (4)	19.266 (4)	38.766	Q
5	Germany	19.416 (5)	19.183 (6)	38.599	Q
6	Bulgaria	19.250 (=6)	19.233 (5)	38.483	Q
7	Brazil	19.150 (8)	19.066 (7)	38.216	Q
8	Italy	19.250 (=6)	18.933 (8)	38.183	Q
9	France	19.050 (9)	18.850 (9)	37.900	-
10	Spain	19.033 (10)	18.816 (10)	37.849	-
