= List of Olympic medalists in rhythmic gymnastics =

This is the complete list of Olympic medalists in rhythmic gymnastics.

== Rhythmic gymnastics ==
=== Current program ===
==== All-around, individual ====
Games	Gold	Silver	Bronze
1984 Los Angeles	Lori Fung; Canada	Doina Staiculescu; Romania	Regina Weber; West Germany
1988 Seoul	Marina Lobatch; Soviet Union (Belarus)	Adriana Dunavska; Bulgaria	Alexandra Timoshenko; Soviet Union (Ukraine)
1992 Barcelona	Alexandra Timoshenko; Unified Team (Ukraine)	Carolina Pascual; Spain	Oxana Skaldina; Unified Team (Ukraine)
1996 Atlanta	Ekaterina Serebrianskaya; Ukraine	Yanina Batyrchina; Russia	Elena Vitrichenko; Ukraine
2000 Sydney	Yulia Barsukova; Russia	Yulia Raskina; Belarus	Alina Kabaeva; Russia
2004 Athens	Alina Kabaeva; Russia	Irina Tchachina; Russia	Anna Bessonova; Ukraine
2008 Beijing	Yevgeniya Kanayeva; Russia	Inna Zhukova; Belarus	Anna Bessonova; Ukraine
2012 London	Yevgeniya Kanayeva; Russia	Daria Dmitrieva; Russia	Liubov Charkashyna; Belarus
2016 Rio	Margarita Mamun; Russia	Yana Kudryavtseva; Russia	Ganna Rizatdinova; Ukraine
2020 Tokyo	Linoy Ashram; Israel	Dina Averina; Russia	Alina Harnasko; Belarus
2024 Paris	Darja Varfolomeev; Germany	Boryana Kaleyn; Bulgaria	Sofia Raffaeli; Italy

==== All-around, group ====
Games	Gold	Silver	Bronze
1996 Atlanta	Spain; Estela Giménez Cid; Marta Baldó Marín; Nuria Cabanillas Provencio; Lorena Guréndez García; Estíbaliz Martínez Yerro; Tania Lamarca Celada	Bulgaria; Ina Delcheva; Valentina Kevlian; Maria Koleva; Maja Tabakova; Ivelina Taleva; Vjara Vatachka	Russia; Yevgeniya Bochkaryova; Irina Dzyuba; Yuliya Ivanova; Yelena Krivoshey; Olga Shtyrenko; Angelina Yushkova
2000 Sydney	Russia; Irina Belova; Yelena Chalamova; Natalia Lavrova; Mariya Netesova; Vyera Shimanskaya; Irina Zilber	Belarus; Tatyana Ananko; Tatyana Belan; Anna Glazkova; Irina Ilyenkova; Maria Lazuk; Olga Puzhevich	Greece; Eirini Aindili; Evangelia Christodoulou; Maria Georgatou; Zacharoula Karyami; Charikleia Pantazi; Anna Pollatou
2004 Athens	Russia; Olesya Belugina; Olga Glatskikh; Tatiana Kurbakova; Natalia Lavrova; Yelena Posevina; Elena Murzina	Italy; Elisa Blanchi; Fabrizia D'Ottavio; Marinella Falca; Daniela Masseroni; Elisa Santoni; Laura Vernizzi	Bulgaria; Zhaneta Ilieva; Eleonora Kezhova; Zornitsa Marinova; Kristina Rangelova; Galina Tancheva; Vladislava Tancheva
2008 Beijing	Russia; Margarita Aliychuk; Anna Gavrilenko; Tatiana Gorbunova; Elena Posevina; Darya Shkurihina; Natalia Zueva	China; Cai Tongtong; Chou Tao; Lü Yuanyang; Sui Jianshuang; Sun Dan; Zhang Shuo	Belarus; Olesya Babushkina; Anastasia Ivankova; Ksenia Sankovich; Zinaida Lunina; Glafira Martinovich; Alina Tumilovich
2012 London	Russia; Ksenia Dudkina; Alina Makarenko; Uliana Donskova; Anastasia Bliznyuk; Karolina Sevastyanova; Anastasia Nazarenko	Belarus; Maryna Hancharova; Anastasia Ivankova; Nataliya Leshchyk; Aliaksandra Narkevich; Ksenia Sankovich; Alina Tumilovich	Italy; Elisa Blanchi; Romina Laurito; Marta Pagnini; Elisa Santoni; Anzhelika Savrayuk; Andreea Stefanescu
2016 Rio	Russia; Vera Biryukova; Anastasia Bliznyuk; Anastasia Maksimova; Anastasia Tatareva; Maria Tolkacheva	Spain; Sandra Aguilar; Artemi Gavezou; Elena López; Lourdes Mohedano; Alejandra Quereda	Bulgaria; Reneta Kamberova; Lyubomira Kazanova; Mihaela Maevska-Velichkova; Tsvetelina Naydenova; Hristiana Todorova
2020 Tokyo	Bulgaria; Simona Dyankova; Stefani Kiryakova; Madlen Radukanova; Laura Traets; Erika Zafirova	ROC; Anastasia Bliznyuk; Anastasia Maksimova; Angelina Shkatova; Anastasia Tatareva; Alisa Tishchenko	Italy; Martina Centofanti; Agnese Duranti; Alessia Maurelli; Daniela Mogurean; Martina Santandrea
2024 Paris	China; Guo Qiqi; Hao Ting; Huang Zhangjiayang; Wang Lanjing; Ding Xinyi	Israel; Ofir Shaham; Diana Svertsov; Adar Friedmann; Romi Paritzki; Shani Bakanov	Italy; Martina Centofanti; Agnese Duranti; Alessia Maurelli; Daniela Mogurean; Laura Paris

== Medal table ==
Rank	Nation	Gold	Silver	Bronze	Total
1	Russia	10	6	2	18
2	Bulgaria	1	3	2	6
3	Spain	1	2	0	3
4	China	1	1	0	2
4	Israel	1	1	0	2
6	Ukraine	1	0	4	5
7	Soviet Union	1	0	1	2
7	Unified Team	1	0	1	2
9	Canada	1	0	0	1
9	Germany	1	0	0	1
11	Belarus	0	4	3	7
12	Italy	0	1	4	5
13	Romania	0	1	0	1
14	Greece	0	0	1	1
14	West Germany	0	0	1	1
Totals (15 entries)		19	19	19	57
