= Gymnastics at the 2000 Summer Olympics =

Gymnastics at the Games of the XXVII Olympiad
- Venue: Sydney SuperDome (artistic and trampoline); Sydney Showground (rhythmic)
- Dates: 16 September – 1 October 2000

At the 2000 Summer Olympics, three different gymnastics disciplines were contested: artistic gymnastics, rhythmic gymnastics, and trampoline. The artistic gymnastics and trampoline events were held at the Sydney SuperDome on 16–25 September and 22–23 September, respectively. The rhythmic gymnastics events were held at Pavilion 3 of the Sydney Olympic Park on 28 September – 1 October.

== Artistic gymnastics ==
=== Format of competition ===
No compulsory routines were performed in artistic gymnastics at the 2000 Summer Olympics. Instead, all participating gymnasts, including those who were not part of a team, participated in a qualification round. The results of this competition determined which teams and individuals participated in the remaining competitions, which included:

- The team competition, in which the six highest scoring teams from qualifications competed. Each team of six gymnasts could have up to five gymnasts perform on each apparatus, and only the four highest scores counted toward the team total.
- The all-around competition, in which the thirty-six highest scoring individuals in the all-around competed. Each country was limited to three gymnasts in the all-around final.
- The event finals, in which the eight highest scoring individuals on each apparatus competed. Each country was limited to two gymnasts in each apparatus final.

=== Men's events ===
Games	Gold	Silver	Bronze
Team all-around	China; Huang Xu; Li Xiaopeng; Xiao Junfeng; Xing Aowei; Yang Wei; Zheng Lihui	Ukraine; Oleksandr Beresh; Valeri Goncharov; Ruslan Mezentsev; Valeri Pereshkura; Olexander Svitlichni; Roman Zozulya	Russia; Maxim Aleshin; Alexei Bondarenko; Dmitri Drevin; Nikolai Kryukov; Alexei Nemov; Yevgeni Podgorny
Individual all-around	Alexei Nemov; Russia	Yang Wei; China	Oleksandr Beresh; Ukraine
Floor exercise	Igors Vihrovs; Latvia	Alexei Nemov; Russia	Yordan Yovchev; Bulgaria
Pommel horse	Marius Urzică; Romania	Eric Poujade; France	Alexei Nemov; Russia
Rings	Szilveszter Csollány; Hungary	Dimosthenis Tampakos; Greece	Yordan Yovchev; Bulgaria
Vault	Gervasio Deferr; Spain	Alexei Bondarenko; Russia	Leszek Blanik; Poland
Parallel bars	Li Xiaopeng; China	Lee Joo-Hyung; South Korea	Alexei Nemov; Russia
Horizontal bar	Alexei Nemov; Russia	Benjamin Varonian; France	Lee Joo-Hyung; South Korea

=== Women's events ===
Andreea Răducan originally won the gold medal in the women's all-around competition, but she was disqualified after she tested positive for pseudoephedrine.

The Federation Internationale de Gymnastique Executive Board announced on 27 February 2010 after an investigation into the Chinese team for violations of age rules for senior gymnastics competitions that team member Dong Fangxiao, who had been entered as 17 years old, was actually 14 at the time of the Olympics (two years below the minimum age). Her 1999 World Championships and 2000 Olympic results were struck from the records, and in April 2010, nearly ten years after the event, the IOC officially disqualified China, who had originally won the bronze medal in the women's team event.

The now-third place team from the United States was awarded the bronze at the 2010 national championships, held at the XL Center in Hartford, CT.

Games	Gold	Silver	Bronze
Team all-around	Romania; Simona Amânar; Loredana Boboc; Andreea Isărescu; Maria Olaru; Claudia Presăcan; Andreea Răducan	Russia; Anna Chepeleva; Svetlana Khorkina; Anastasiya Kolesnikova; Yekaterina Lobaznyuk; Elena Produnova; Elena Zamolodchikova	United States; Amy Chow; Jamie Dantzscher; Dominique Dawes; Kristen Maloney; Elise Ray; Tasha Schwikert
Individual all-around	Simona Amânar; Romania	Maria Olaru; Romania	Liu Xuan; China
Vault	Elena Zamolodchikova; Russia	Andreea Răducan; Romania	Yekaterina Lobaznyuk; Russia
Uneven bars	Svetlana Khorkina; Russia	Ling Jie; China	Yang Yun; China
Balance beam	Liu Xuan; China	Yekaterina Lobaznyuk; Russia	Elena Produnova; Russia
Floor exercise	Elena Zamolodchikova; Russia	Svetlana Khorkina; Russia	Simona Amânar; Romania

== Rhythmic gymnastics ==
Games	Gold	Silver	Bronze
Individual all-around	Yulia Barsukova; Russia	Yulia Raskina; Belarus	Alina Kabaeva; Russia
Group all-around	Russia; Irina Belova; Yelena Chalamova; Natalia Lavrova; Mariya Netesova; Vyera Shimanskaya; Irina Zilber	Belarus; Tatyana Ananko; Tatyana Belan; Anna Glazkova; Irina Ilyenkova; Maria Lazuk; Olga Puzhevich	Greece; Eirini Aindili; Evangelia Christodoulou; Maria Georgatou; Zacharoula Karyami; Charikleia Pantazi; Anna Pollatou

== Trampoline ==
Games	Gold	Silver	Bronze
Men's individual	Alexander Moskalenko; Russia	Ji Wallace; Australia	Mathieu Turgeon; Canada
Women's individual	Irina Karavaeva; Russia	Oxana Tsyhuleva; Ukraine	Karen Cockburn; Canada

== Medal table ==
Rank	Nation	Gold	Silver	Bronze	Total
1	Russia	9	5	6	20
2	China	3	2	2	7
3	Romania	3	2	1	6
4	Hungary	1	0	0	1
4	Latvia	1	0	0	1
4	Spain	1	0	0	1
7	Ukraine	0	2	1	3
8	Belarus	0	2	0	2
8	France	0	2	0	2
10	Greece	0	1	1	2
10	South Korea	0	1	1	2
12	Australia	0	1	0	1
13	Bulgaria	0	0	2	2
13	Canada	0	0	2	2
15	Poland	0	0	1	1
15	United States	0	0	1	1
Totals (16 entries)		18	18	18	54

== See also ==
- Gymnastics at the 1998 Asian Games
- Gymnastics at the 1998 Commonwealth Games
- Gymnastics at the 1999 Pan American Games
- 1999 World Artistic Gymnastics Championships
