= Belarus at the 2000 Summer Olympics =

- IOC code: BLR
- NOC: Belarus Olympic Committee
- Website: www.noc.by (in Russian and English)

in Sydney
- Competitors: 139 (72 men and 67 women) in 20 sports
- Flag bearer: Sergey Lishtvan
- Medals Ranked 23rd: Gold 3 Silver 3 Bronze 11 Total 17

Summer Olympics appearances (overview)
- 1996; 2000; 2004; 2008; 2012; 2016; 2020; 2024

Other related appearances
- Russian Empire (1900–1912); Poland (1924–1936); Soviet Union (1952–1988); Unified Team (1992); Individual Neutral Athletes (2024)

Belarus competed at the 2000 Summer Olympics in Sydney, Australia. 139 competitors, 72 men and 67 women, took part in 109 events in 20 sports. Belarus had its best ever showing both in terms of gold and overall medals at these games. The gold medal result will be later matched in 2008.

== Medalists ==
Medal	Name	Sport	Event
Gold	Yanina Karolchik	Athletics	Women's shot put
Gold	Ellina Zvereva	Athletics	Women's discus
Gold	Ekaterina Karsten	Rowing	Women's single sculls
Silver	Yulia Raskina	Gymnastics	Women's individual all-around
Silver	Tatyana Ananko; Tatyana Belan; Anna Glazkova; Irina Ilyenkova; Maria Lazuk; Olga Puzhevich	Gymnastics	Women's group all around
Silver	Igor Basinsky	Shooting	Men's 50 metre pistol
Bronze	Irina Yatchenko	Athletics	Women's discus throw
Bronze	Igor Astapkovich	Athletics	Men's discus throw
Bronze	Natalya Sazanovich	Athletics	Women's heptathlon
Bronze	Anatoly Laryukov	Judo	Men's half-middleweight
Bronze	Pavel Dovgal	Modern pentathlon	Men's competition
Bronze	Igor Basinsky	Shooting	Men's 10 metre air pistol
Bronze	Lalita Yauhleuskaya	Shooting	Women's 25 metre pistol
Bronze	Sergei Martynov	Shooting	Men's 50 metre rifle prone
Bronze	Gennady Oleshchuk	Weightlifting	Men's 62 kg
Bronze	Sergey Lavrenov	Weightlifting	Men's 69 kg
Bronze	Dmitry Debelka	Wrestling	Men's Greco-Roman 130 kg

== Archery ==
In its second Olympic archery competition, Belarus was represented by two women. They were not as successful as they had been four years earlier, but two of the archers still won in their first matches.

Athlete	Event	Ranking round		Round of 64	Round of 32	Round of 16	Quarterfinals	Semifinals	Final / BM	
Athlete	Event	Score	Seed	Opposition Score	Opposition Score	Opposition Score	Opposition Score	Opposition Score	Opposition Score	Rank
Anna Karaseva	Women's individual	629	29	Gallardo (ESP); W 163–162	Yun (KOR); L 152–162	did not advance				
Olga Moroz	Women's individual	620	41	Nowicka (POL); L 139–152	did not advance					

== Athletics ==
Men

Road events

Athlete	Event	Heat		Quarterfinal		Semifinal		Final	
Athlete	Event	Time	Rank	Time	Rank	Time	Rank	Time	Rank
Viktor Ginko	50 km walk	—N/a						DQ	
Mikhail Khmelnitskiy	20 km walk	—N/a						1:28:02	34
Andrey Makarov	20 km walk	—N/a						1:23:33	17
Artur Meleshkevich	20 km walk	—N/a						1:24:50	21
Pavel Pelepyagin	800 m	01:46.67	1 Q	—N/a		01:50.37	7	did not advance	
Leonid Vershinin	400 m hurdles	51.84	53	did not advance					

Field events

Athlete	Event	Qualification		Final	
Athlete	Event	Result	Rank	Result	Rank
Igor Astapkovich	Hammer Throw	79.81	1 Q	79.17	3rd place, bronze medalist(s)
Leonid Cherevko	Discus throw	58.32	33	did not advance	
Vladimir Dubrovshchik	Discus throw	64.03	7 Q	65.13	7
Vasiliy Kaptyukh	Discus throw	65.90	4 Q	67.59	4
Aleksei Lelin	High jump	2.15	34	did not advance	
Andrei Mikhnevich	Shot put	19.97	7 q	19.48	9
Vladimir Sasimovich	Javelin Throw	78.04	24	did not advance	
Ivan Tikhon	Hammer Throw	76.90	10 q	79.17	4

Women

Track & road events

Athlete	Event	Heat		Quarterfinal		Semifinal		Final	
Athlete	Event	Time	Rank	Time	Rank	Time	Rank	Time	Rank
Natasha Dukhnova	800m	02:03.20	22	did not advance					
Nataliya Misyulya	20 km walk	—N/a						1:33:08	9
Larisa Ramazanova	20 km walk	—N/a						1:37:39	32
Valentina Tsybulskaya	20 km walk	—N/a						1:36:44	28
Elena Bunnik; Anna Kazak; Irina Khlyustova; Natalya Sologub	4 × 400 m relay	03:26.31	9	did not advance					

Field events

Athlete	Event	Qualification		Final	
Athlete	Event	Result	Rank	Result	Rank
Lyudmila Gubkina	Hammer Throw	63.29	10 q	67.08	6
Yanina Karolchyk	Shot put	19.36	1 Q	20.56	1st place, gold medalist(s)
Natallia Safronava	Triple Jump	13.91	15	did not advance	
Tatyana Shevchik	High Jump	1.85	30	did not advance	
Svetlana Sudak	Hammer Throw	63.83	8 q	64.21	10
Olga Tsander	Hammer Throw	NM		did not advance	
Irina Yatchenko	Discus Throw	62.72	5 q	65.20	3rd place, bronze medalist(s)
Ellina Zvereva	Discus Throw	64.81	1 Q	68.40	1st place, gold medalist(s)

Combined events - Heptathlon

Athlete	Event	100H	HJ	SP	200 m	LJ	JT	800 m	Points	Rank
Natalya Sazanovich	Result	13.45	1.84	14.79	24.12	6.50	43.97	02:16.41	6527	3rd place, bronze medalist(s)
Natalya Sazanovich	Points	1058	1029	847	969	1007	744	873	6527	3rd place, bronze medalist(s)

== Boxing ==
Men

Athlete	Event	Round of 32	Round of 16	Quarterfinals	Semifinals	Final	
Athlete	Event	Opposition Result	Opposition Result	Opposition Result	Opposition Result	Opposition Result	Rank
Sergey Bykovsky	Light welterweight	Brin (PHI); W 8–3	Suleymanoglu (TUR); W 8-8	Abdullaev (UZB); L 6–9	did not advance		5

== Canoeing ==
=== Sprint ===
Men

Athlete	Event	Heat		Repechage		Semifinal		Final	
Athlete	Event	Time	Rank	Time	Rank	Time	Rank	Time	Rank
Aleksandr Maseikov	C-1 500 m	01:54.468	7 Q	BYE		01:55.035	8	did not advance	

Women

Athlete	Event	Heat		Repechage		Semifinal		Final	
Athlete	Event	Time	Rank	Time	Rank	Time	Rank	Time	Rank
Elena Bet; Svetlana Vakula	K-2 500 m	1:55.757	7 Q	BYE		1:49.758	7	did not advance	
Alesya Bakunova; Elena Bet; Natalya Bondarenko; Svetlana Vakula	K-4 500 m	01:34.734	2 Q	—N/a		BYE		01:37.748	6

== Diving ==
Men

Athlete	Event	Preliminary		Semifinal				Final			
Athlete	Event	Points	Rank	Points	Rank	Total	Rank	Points	Rank	Total	Rank
Vyacheslav Khamulkin	3 m springboard	357.03	23	did not advance							

Women

Athlete	Event	Preliminary		Semifinal				Final			
Athlete	Event	Points	Rank	Points	Rank	Total	Rank	Points	Rank	Total	Rank
Svetlana Alekseyeva	3 m springboard	260.91	17 Q	216.48	12	477.39	15	did not advance			

== Fencing ==
Four fencers, all men, represented Belarus in 2000.

Men

Athlete	Event	Round of 64	Round of 32	Round of 16	Quarterfinal	Semifinal	Final / BM	
Athlete	Event	Opposition Score	Opposition Score	Opposition Score	Opposition Score	Opposition Score	Opposition Score	Rank
Andrey Murashko	Individual épée	Bloom (USA); L 4–8	did not advance					38
Vladimir Pchenikin	Individual épée	BYE	Milanoli (ITA); L 9–15	did not advance				31
Vitaly Zakharov	Individual épée	BYE	Sang-Yeop (KOR); L 14–15	did not advance				24
Vitaly Zakharov; Andrey Murashko; Vladimir Pchenikin	Team épée	—N/a		Austria; W 45–44	South Korea; L 44–45	Australia; W 45–34	Germany; L 37–41	6
Dmitry Lapkes	Individual sabre	Samir (EGY); W 15–7	Careta (ITA); W 15–9	Covaliu (ROU); L 11–15	did not advance			15

== Gymnastics ==
Men
Team

Athlete	Event	Qualification								Final							
Athlete	Event	Apparatus						Total	Rank	Apparatus						Total	Rank
Athlete	Event	F	PH	R	V	PB	HB	Total	Rank	F	PH	R	V	PB	HB	Total	Rank
Aleksei Sinkevich	Team	9.462	9.587	9.462	9.312	9.287	9.512	56.622	16 Q	8.750	9.587	9.500	9.137	9.575	9.512	56.061	23
Vitaly Rudnitski	Team	9.525	—N/a	9.487	9.125	9.262	—N/a	37.399	73	did not advance							
Ivan Ivankov	Team	8.925	9.625	9.675 Q	9.350	9.662 Q	9.712	56.949	11 Q	9.575	9.725	9.762	9.500	9.700	9.762	58.024	4
Aleksandr Shostak	Team	—N/a	9.462	9.537	—N/a	9.412	9.562	37.973	69	did not advance							
Ivan Pavlovski	Team	9.350	9.325	9.337	9.350	9.462	9.550	56.374	22 Q	8.925	9.500	9.312	9.437	8.375	9.362	54.911	33
Aleksandr Kruzhilov	Team	9.462	9.237	—N/a	9.025	—N/a	9.500	37.224	75	did not advance							
Total	Team	37.799 (3)	37.999 (11)	38.161 (7)	37.137 (9)	37.823 (7)	38.336 (7)	227.255	8	did not advance							

Individual finals

Athlete	Event	Apparatus						Total	Rank
Athlete	Event	F	PH	R	V	PB	HB	Total	Rank
Ivan Ivankov	Rings	—N/a		9.700	—N/a			9.700	5
Ivan Ivankov	Parallel bars	—N/a				9.775	—N/a	9.775	5

Women
Team

Athlete	Event	Qualification						Final					
Athlete	Event	Apparatus				Total	Rank	Apparatus				Total	Rank
Athlete	Event	V	UB	BB	F	Total	Rank	V	UB	BB	F	Total	Rank
Tatyana Grigorenko	Team	9.062	—N/a	8.425	7.200	24.687	79	did not advance					
Anna Meisak	Team	—N/a	8.812	8.550	—N/a	17.362	91	did not advance					
Natalya Naranovich	Team	8.949	9.350	—N/a	8.850	27.149	75	did not advance					
Alena Polozkova	Team	9.106	9.575	9.375	9.500	37.556	23 Q	9.100	8.225	9.275	9.562	36.162	33
Marina Zarzhitskaya	Team	9.431	9.237	9.050	9.050	36.768	40 Q	9.387	9.637	9.150	8.700	36.874	26
Tatyana Zharganova	Team	9.018	9.712	9.212	8.500	36.442	46	did not advance					
Total	Team	36.617 (11)	37.874 (10)	36.187 (12)	35.900 (12)	146.578	12	did not advance					

Individual finals

Athlete	Event	Apparatus				Total	Rank
Athlete	Event	V	UB	BB	F	Total	Rank
Tatyana Zharganova	Uneven bars	—N/a	9.737	—N/a		9.737	5

== Judo ==
Men

Athlete	Event	Preliminary	Round of 32	Round of 16	Quarterfinals	Semifinals	Repechage 1	Repechage 2	Repechage 3	Final / BM	
Athlete	Event	Opposition Result	Opposition Result	Opposition Result	Opposition Result	Opposition Result	Opposition Result	Opposition Result	Opposition Result	Opposition Result	Rank
Natik Bagirov	−60 kg	BYE	Lourenço (BRA); W 0101–0100	Ismayilov (AZE); L 0010–1100	did not advance						17
Anatoly Laryukhov	−73 kg	BYE	Kheder (FRA); W 1000–0010	Velasco (PER); W 1000–0010	Bilodid (UKR); W 1000–0100	Maddaloni (ITA); L 0100–0000	BYE			Pedro (USA); W 1000–0000	3rd place, bronze medalist(s)
Siarhei Kukharenka	−81 kg	BYE	Chen (TPE); W 1000–0000	Kwak (PRK); L 0010-0010	did not advance						17
Leonid Svirid	−100 kg	BYE	Ivan (ROU); L 0000–0100	did not advance							17
Ruslan Scharapov	+100 kg	—N/a	Shinohara (JPN); L 0000–1000	did not advance			Berduta (KAZ); W 1000–0100	Sánchez (CUB); W 1000–0100	Pan (CHN); W 0100–0011	Pertelson (EST); L 0000–1000	5

== Modern pentathlon ==
Athlete	Event	Shooting (10 m air pistol)			Fencing (épée one touch)			Swimming (200 m freestyle)			Riding (show jumping)			Running (3000 m)			Total points	Final rank
Athlete	Event	Points	Rank	MP Points	Wins	Rank	MP points	Time	Rank	MP points	Penalties	Rank	MP points	Time	Rank	MP Points	Total points	Final rank
Pavel Dovgal	Men's	186	1	1168	10	17	760	2:04.62	4	1254	30	1	1070	9:38.75	12	1086	5338	3rd place, bronze medalist(s)
Janna Choubenok	Women's	179	19	1084	12	18	840	2:25.89	11	1142	90	9	1010	11:17.89	11	1010	5086	6

== Rhythmic gymnastics ==
=== Individual ===
Athlete	Event	Qualification						Final					
Athlete	Event	Rope	Hoop	Ball	Ribbon	Total	Rank	Rope	Hoop	Ball	Ribbon	Total	Rank
Yulia Raskina	Individual	9.900	9.908	9.908	9.908	39.624	2 Q	9.908	9.791	9.983	9.916	39.548	2nd place, silver medalist(s)
Valeria Vatkina	Individual	9.750	9.733	9.775	9.800	39.058	6 Q	9.791	9.750	9.666	9.750	38.957	8

=== Team ===
Athlete	Event	Qualification				Final			
Athlete	Event	Clubs	Ribbons & Hoops	Total	Rank	Clubs	Ribbons & Hoops	Total	Rank
Tatyana Ananko; Tatyana Belan; Anna Glazkova; Irina Ilyenkova; Maria Lazuk; Olga Puzhevich	Group	19.700	19.666	39.366	2 Q	19.800	19.700	39.500	2nd place, silver medalist(s)

== Rowing ==
Women

Athlete	Event	Heats		Repechages		Semifinals		Final	
Athlete	Event	Time	Rank	Time	Rank	Time	Rank	Time	Rank
Ekaterina Karsten	Single sculls	7:47.73	1 Q	BYE		7:40.36	2 FA	7:28.14	1st place, gold medalist(s)
Irina Bazilevskaya; Marina Kuzhmar; Olga Berezneva; Marina Znak; Yuliya Bichik; Inessa Zakharevskaya; Nataliya Gelakh; Olga Tratsevskaya; Valentina Khokhlova	Eights	6:19.02	3 R	6:19.42	4 FA	—N/a		6:13.57	4

== Sailing ==
Men

Athlete	Event	Race											Net points	Final rank
Athlete	Event	1	2	3	4	5	6	7	8	9	10	11	Net points	Final rank
Igor Ivashintsov; Mikhail Protasevich	470	15	~~29~~	20	20	23	14	18	~~DSQ~~	24	5	14	153	21

Women

Athlete	Event	Race											Net points	Final rank
Athlete	Event	1	2	3	4	5	6	7	8	9	10	11	Net points	Final rank
Tatiana Drozdovskaya	Europe	25	16	17	17	26	~~27~~	~~OCS~~	18	21	17	19	176	24

Open

Athlete	Event	Race											Net points	Final rank
Athlete	Event	1	2	3	4	5	6	7	8	9	10	11	Net points	Final rank
Aleksandr Mumyga	Laser	28	27	20	29	20	29	~~40~~	~~34~~	28	32	30	243	32

M = Medal race; EL = Eliminated – did not advance into the medal race; CAN = Race cancelled

== Shooting ==
Men

Athlete	Event	Qualification		Final	
Athlete	Event	Score	Rank	Score	Rank
Igor Basinski	10 m air pistol	583	4 Q	682.7	3rd place, bronze medalist(s)
Igor Basinski	50 m pistol	569	2 Q	663.3	2nd place, silver medalist(s)
Anatoli Klimenko	10 m air rifle	593	2 Q	693.4	4
Anatoli Klimenko	50 m rifle three positions	1157	25	did not advance	
Oleg Khvatsovas	25 m rapid fire pistol	586	5 Q	682.4	6
Kanstantsin Lukashyk	10 m air pistol	577	15	did not advance	
Kanstantsin Lukashyk	50 m pistol	560	9	did not advance	
Sergei Martynov	50 m rifle prone	598	2 Q	700.3	3rd place, bronze medalist(s)
Sergei Martynov	50 m rifle three positions	1164	9	did not advance	
Georgi Nekhayev	10 m air rifle	588	18	did not advance	
Georgi Nekhayev	50 m rifle prone	593	19	did not advance	

Women

Athlete	Event	Qualification		Final	
Athlete	Event	Score	Rank	Score	Rank
Viktoria Chaika	10 m air pistol	381	11	did not advance	
Oksana Kovtonovich	10 m air rifle	389	32	did not advance	
Olga Pogrebniak	50 m rifle three positions	578	11	did not advance	
Olga Pogrebniak	10 m air rifle	393	9	did not advance	
Irina Shilova	50 m rifle three positions	574	20	did not advance	
Yulia Sinyak	25 m pistol	584	4 Q	685.9	4
Lalita Yauhleuskaya	25 m pistol	583	5 Q	686.0	3rd place, bronze medalist(s)
Lalita Yauhleuskaya	10 m air pistol	381	11	did not advance	

== Swimming ==
Men

Athlete	Event	Heat		Semifinal		Final	
Athlete	Event	Time	Rank	Time	Rank	Time	Rank
Aliaksandr Hukau	100 metre breaststroke	1:04.96	46	did not advance			
Aliaksandr Hukau	200 metre breaststroke	2:16.93	22	did not advance			
Dimitri Kalinovski	50 metre freestyle	23.21	34	did not advance			
Igor Koleda	200 metre freestyle	1:49.01	7 Q	1:49.52	12	did not advance	
Dmitry Koptur	400 metre freestyle	03:55.26	22	did not advance			
Dmitry Koptur	1500 m freestyle	15:29.62	20	did not advance			
Aleh Rukhlevich	100 metre freestyle	50.96	30	did not advance			
Igor Koleda; Pavel Lagun; Dmitry Kalinovsky; Aleh Rukhlevich	4 × 100 m freestyle relay	03:20.85	10	did not advance			
Igor Koleda; Pavel Lagun; Dmitry Koptur; Valery Khuroshvili	4 × 200 m freestyle relay	07:24.83	12	did not advance			

Women

Athlete	Event	Heat		Final B		Final	
Athlete	Event	Time	Rank	Time	Rank	Time	Rank
Natalya Baranovskaya	200 metre freestyle	02:00.58	10 Q	01:59.90	3 Q	01:59.28	6 NR
Natalya Baranovskaya	400 metre freestyle	04:12.67	13	did not advance			
Alena Popchanka	50 metre freestyle	26.1	26	did not advance			
Alena Popchanka	100 metre freestyle	56.33	16 Q	56.4	16	did not advance	

== Synchronized swimming ==
Athlete	Event	Technical routine		Free routine		Preliminary		Free routine (final)		
Athlete	Event	Points	Rank	Points	Rank	Total	Rank	Points	Total	Rank
Khrystsina Nadezhdina; Natallia Sakharuk	Duet	30.287	17	55.164	20	85.451	19	did not advance		

== Table tennis ==
Men

Athlete	Event	Group stage			Round of 32	Round of 16	Quarterfinal	Semifinal	Final / BM	
Athlete	Event	Opposition Result	Opposition Result	Rank	Opposition Result	Opposition Result	Opposition Result	Opposition Result	Opposition Result	Rank
Yevgeny Shchetinin	Men's singles	Saive (BEL); L 1–3	Morales (CHI); W 3–0	2	did not advance					33
Vladimir Samsonov	Men's singles	BYE			Chang (TPE); W 3–0	Legout (FRA); W 3–0	Waldner (SWE); L 2–3	did not advance		5
Vladimir Samsonov; Evgueni Chtchetinine	Men's doubles	Håkansson / Karlsson (SWE); L 0–2	Zhuang / Sweeris (USA); W 2–0	2	—N/a	did not advance				17

Women

Athlete	Event	Group stage			Round of 32	Round of 16	Quarterfinal	Semifinal	Final / BM	
Athlete	Event	Opposition Result	Opposition Result	Rank	Opposition Result	Opposition Result	Opposition Result	Opposition Result	Opposition Result	Rank
Tatyana Kostromina	Women's singles	Svensson (SWE); L 2–3	Al-Najar (JOR); W 3–0	2	did not advance					33
Veronika Pavlovich	Women's singles	Boileau (FRA); L 0–3	Ghatak (IND); W 3–0	2	did not advance					33
Viktoria Pavlovich	Women's singles	Svensson (SWE); L 1–3	El-Alfy (EGY); W 3–0	2	did not advance					33
Tatyana Kostromina; Viktoria Pavlovich	Women's doubles	Svensson / Svensson (SWE); W 2–1	Abdul-Aziz / Othman (EGY); W 2–0	1 Q	—N/a	Eun-Sil / Eun-Mi (KOR); L 0–3	did not advance			9

== Tennis ==
Men

Athlete	Event	Round of 64	Round of 32	Round of 16	Quarterfinal	Semifinal	Final / BM	
Athlete	Event	Opposition Result	Opposition Result	Opposition Result	Opposition Result	Opposition Result	Opposition Result	Rank
Max Mirnyi	Singles	Hewitt (AUS); W 6–3, 6–3	Vaněk (CZE); W 6–7, 6–4, 11–9	Zabaleta (ARG); W 7–6, 6–2	Haas (GER); L 6–4, 5–7, 3–6	did not advance		5
Vladimir Voltchkov	Singles	Gaudio (ARG); L 7–6, 4–6, 6–1	Di Pasquale (FRA); L 2–6, 2–6	did not advance				
Max Mirnyi; Vladimir Voltchkov	Doubles	—N/a	Kulti / Tillström (SWE); W 6–3, 4-4r	Clément / Escudé (FRA); W 6–4, 7–6	Corretja / Costa (ESP); L 7–6, 3–6, 5–7	did not advance		5

Women

Athlete	Event	Round of 64	Round of 32	Round of 16	Quarterfinal	Semifinal	Final / BM	
Athlete	Event	Opposition Result	Opposition Result	Opposition Result	Opposition Result	Opposition Result	Opposition Result	Rank
Olga Barabanschikova	Singles	Wartusch (AUT); L 4–6, 2–6	did not advance					
Natasha Zvereva	Singles	Salerni (ARG); L 3–6, 6–4, 2–6	did not advance					
Olga Barabanschikova; Natasha Zvereva	Doubles	—N/a	Wartusch / Schett (AUT); W 6–2, 6–2	Martínez / Vicario (ESP); W 6–4, 7–5	Mandula / Marosi (HUN); W 6–3, 7–5	Boogert / Oremans (NED); L 3–6, 2–6	Callens / Monami (BEL); L 6–4, 4–6, 1–6	4

== Trampolining ==
Athlete	Event	Qualification		Final	
Athlete	Event	Score	Rank	Score	Rank
Dimitri Polyarush	Men's	68.30	3 Q	38.10	5
Natalia Karpenkova	Women's	63.80	5 Q	35.80	5

== Weightlifting ==
Men

Athlete	Event	Snatch		Clean & Jerk		Total	Rank
Athlete	Event	Result	Rank	Result	Rank	Total	Rank
Vitaly Derbenyov	– 56 kg	125.0	5	150.0	9	275.0	7
Gennady Oleshchuk	– 62 kg	142.5	3	175.0	3	317.5	3rd place, bronze medalist(s)
Sergey Lavrenov	– 69 kg	157.5	3	182.5	7	340.0	3rd place, bronze medalist(s)
Pavel Bazuk	– 94 kg	167.5	16	197.5	16	365.0	16

Women

Athlete	Event	Snatch		Clean & Jerk		Total	Rank
Athlete	Event	Result	Rank	Result	Rank	Total	Rank
Hanna Batsiushka	– 58 kg	90.0	8	107.5	8	197.5	8

== Wrestling ==
Freestyle

Athlete	Event	Elimination Pool				Quarterfinal	Semifinal	Final / BM	
Athlete	Event	Opposition Result	Opposition Result	Opposition Result	Rank	Opposition Result	Opposition Result	Opposition Result	Rank
Herman Kantoyeu	−54 kg	García (CUB); W 7–1	Donbaev (KGZ); L 2–5	—N/a	1 Q	Mamyrov (KAZ); W 4–2	Henson (USA); L 0–4	Kardanov (GRE); L 4–5	4
Aleksandr Guzov	−58 kg	O'Brien (AUS); W 14–4	Pürevbaatar (MGL); L 1–3	—N/a	2	did not advance			8
Mikalai Savin	−63 kg	Hayrapetyan (ARM); L 4–7	Boburbekov (KGZ); W 4–1	—N/a	2	did not advance			12
Sergey Demchenko	−69 kg	Johnston (AUS); W 10–0	Askarov (KGZ); W 3–0	Veliyev (KAZ); W WO	1 Q	BYE	Gitinov (RUS); L 2–3	McIlravy (USA); L 1–3	4
Beibulat Musaev	−85 kg	Saitiev (RUS); L 1–4	Praporshchikov (AUS); W 13–0	—N/a	2	did not advance			9
Aleksandr Shemarov	−97 kg	Szerda (AUS); W 7–0	Schmeichel (CAN); W 5–0	Garmulewicz (POL); L 2–3	2	did not advance			7
Aleksey Medvedev	−130 kg	Kovalevsky (KGZ); W 3–2	Xingqiang (CHN); W 3–0	BYE	1 Q	Rodríguez (CUB); L 0–4	BYE	McCoy (USA); L WO	6

Greco-Roman

Athlete	Event	Elimination Pool				Quarterfinal	Semifinal	Final / BM	
Athlete	Event	Opposition Result	Opposition Result	Opposition Result	Rank	Opposition Result	Opposition Result	Opposition Result	Rank
Igor Petrenko	−58 kg	Mnatsakanyan (ARM); W 4–2	Gruenwald (USA); L 0–4	—N/a	2	did not advance			13
Vitaly Zhuk	−63 kg	Beilin (ISR); L 0–1	Kurbanov (UZB); L 1–6	—N/a	3	did not advance			17
Vladimir Kopytov	−69 kg	Adzhi (UKR); L 0–3	Glushkov (RUS); L 0–11	Wolny (POL); L PA	4	did not advance			17
Viachaslau Makaranka	−76 kg	Manukyan (UKR); L 1–12	Michalkiewicz (POL); W 4–1	Iutana (SAM); W 42–0	2	did not advance			7
Valery Tsilent	−85 kg	Menshchikov (RUS); W 3–0	Oliynyk (UKR); L 1–6	—N/a	1 Q	Vakhtangadze (GEO); L 5–6	BYE	Méndez (CUB); W 4–0	4
Sergey Lishtvan	−97 kg	Ežerskis (LTU); L 1–3	Fkiri (TUN); W 10–0	Saldadze (UKR); L 2–5	3	did not advance			9
Dmitry Debelka	−130 kg	Giorgadze (GEO); W 3–0	Bengtsson (SWE); W 2–1	BYE	1 Q	BYE	Karelin (RUS); L 0–3	Evseichik (ISR); W 1–0	3rd place, bronze medalist(s)

== Notes ==
- Wallechinsky, David (2004). The Complete Book of the Summer Olympics (Athens 2004 Edition). Toronto, Canada. ISBN 1-894963-32-6.
- International Olympic Committee (2001). The Results. Retrieved 12 November 2005.
- Sydney Organising Committee for the Olympic Games (2001). Official Report of the XXVII Olympiad Volume 1: Preparing for the Games. Retrieved 20 November 2005.
- Sydney Organising Committee for the Olympic Games (2001). Official Report of the XXVII Olympiad Volume 2: Celebrating the Games. Retrieved 20 November 2005.
- Sydney Organising Committee for the Olympic Games (2001). The Results. Retrieved 20 November 2005.
- International Olympic Committee Web Site
