= Greece at the 2000 Summer Olympics =

- IOC code: GRE
- NOC: Hellenic Olympic Committee
- Website: www.hoc.gr (in Greek and English)

in Sydney Australia
- Competitors: 140 (82 men and 58 women) in 23 sports
- Flag bearer: Nikolaos Kaklamanakis
- Medals Ranked 17th: Gold 4 Silver 6 Bronze 3 Total 13

Summer Olympics appearances (overview)
- 1896; 1900; 1904; 1908; 1912; 1920; 1924; 1928; 1932; 1936; 1948; 1952; 1956; 1960; 1964; 1968; 1972; 1976; 1980; 1984; 1988; 1992; 1996; 2000; 2004; 2008; 2012; 2016; 2020; 2024; 2028

Other related appearances
- 1906 Intercalated Games

Greece competed at the 2000 Summer Olympics in Sydney, Australia. Greek athletes have competed in every Summer Olympic Games. As per tradition, the Greek team entered the stadium first during the opening ceremony to honor the birthplace of the Olympics. At the closing ceremony, a Greek segment was performed, as the country hosted the next Olympics in Athens four years later. Two Greek flags were also hoisted in preparation for the handover, with the Greek national anthem played once.

== Medalists ==
Greece finished in 17th position in the final medal rankings, with four gold medals and 13 medals overall. These were the most successful Olympic Games for Greece in which it was not the host nation.

Medal	Name	Sport	Event
Gold	Konstantinos Kenteris	Athletics	Men's 200 metres
Gold	Michail Mouroutsos	Taekwondo	Men's -58 kg
Gold	Pyrros Dimas	Weightlifting	Men's light heavyweight (-85 kg)
Gold	Kakhi Kakhiashvili	Weightlifting	Men's middle heavyweight (-94 kg)
Silver	Ekaterini Thanou	Athletics	Women's 100 metres
Silver	Anastasia Kelesidou	Athletics	Women's discus throw
Silver	Mirela Maniani	Athletics	Women's javelin throw
Silver	Dimosthenis Tampakos	Gymnastics	Men's rings
Silver	Leonidas Sampanis	Weightlifting	Men's featherweight (-62 kg)
Silver	Viktor Mitrou	Weightlifting	Men's middleweight (-77 kg)
Bronze	Eirini Aindili; Evangelia Christodoulou; Maria Georgatou; Zacharoula Karyami; Charikleia Pantazi; Anna Pollatou	Gymnastics	Women's rhythmic team
Bronze	Ioanna Khatziioannou	Weightlifting	Women's -63 kg
Bronze	Amiran Kardanov	Wrestling	Men's freestyle flyweight (-54 kg)

== Archery ==
Athlete	Event	Ranking round		Round of 64	Round of 32	Round of 16	Quarterfinals	Semifinals	Finals / BM	
Athlete	Event	Score	Seed	Opposition Score	Opposition Score	Opposition Score	Opposition Score	Opposition Score	Opposition Score	Rank
Evangelia Psarra	Women's individual	618	=44	Bolotova (RUS) (21); L 161–154	Did Not Advance					

== Athletics ==
Men Men's 100 m

- Georgios Theodoridis

- Round 1 – 10.34
- Round 2 – 10.29 (did not advance)

- Angelos Pavlakakis

- Round 1 – DNS (did not advance)

Men's 200 m

- Konstantinos Kenteris

- Round 1 – 20.57
- Round 2 – 20.14
- Semifinal – 20.2
- Final – 20.09 (gold medal)

- Anastasios Gousis

- Round 1 – 21.1 (did not advance)

- Alexios Alexopoulos

- Round 1 – DNS (did not advance)

Men's 400 m

- Anastasios Gousis

- Round 1 – 46.38 (did not advance)

Men's 800 m

- Panagiotis Stroubakos

- Round 1 – 01:47.96 (did not advance)

Men's 400 m Hurdles

- Periklis Iakovakis

- Round 1 – 50.2 (did not advance)

Men's 4 × 100 m

- Alexios Alexopoulos, Konstantinos Kenteris, Angelos Pavlakakis, Georgios Theodoridis

- Round 1 – 39.21
- Semifinal – 38.82 (did not advance)

Men's 4 × 400 m

- Stylianos Dimotsios, Anastasios Gousis, Periklis Iakovakis, Georgios Oikonomidis

- Round 1 – 03:06.50 (did not advance)

Men's 3,000 m Steeplechase

- Georgios Giannelis

- Round 1 – 09:19.14 (did not advance)

Men's Shot Put

- Vaios Tigkas

- Qualifying – 18.13 (did not advance)

Men's Javelin Throw

- Konstadinos Gatsioudis

- Qualifying – 88.41
- Final – 86.53 (6th place)

Men's Hammer Throw

- Alexandros Papadimitriou

- Qualifying – 76.61
- Final – 73.30 (12th place)

- Hristos Polihroniou

- Qualifying – 74.02 (did not advance)

Men's Long Jump

- Konstantinos Koukodimos

- Qualifying – 7.44 (did not advance)

- Dimitrios Serelis

- Qualifying – NM (did not advance)

Men's Triple Jump

- Hristos Meletoglou

- Qualifying – 16.00 (did not advance)

- Konstadinos Zalaggitis

- Qualifying – 14.15 (did not advance)

- Stamatios Lenis

- Qualifying – NM (did not advance)

Men's High Jump

- Lambros Papakostas

- Qualifying – DNS (did not advance)

Men's 50 km Walk

- Spyridon Kastanis

- Final – DNF

- Theodoros Stamatopoulos

- Final – DNF

Men's marathon

- Panayiotis Haramis

- Final – 2:26:55 (63rd place)

Men's Decathlon

- Prodromos Korkizoglou

- 100 m – 10.74
- Long Jump – 7.16
- Shot Put – 13.70
- High Jump – 1.97
- 400 m – 53.57
- 100 m Hurdles – DNS
- Discus Throw – DNS
- Pole Vault – DNS

=== Women's Competition ===
Women's 100 m

- Ekaterini Thanou

- Round 1 – 11.10
- Round 2 – 10.99
- Semifinal – 11.10
- Final – 11.12 (silver medal)

- Paraskevi Patoulidou

- Round 1 – 11.65 (did not advance)

Women's 200 m

- Ekaterini Koffa

- Round 1 – 23.53 (did not advance)

Women's 5,000 m

- Hrisostomia Iakovou

- Round 1 – 15:46.48 (did not advance)

Women's 10,000 m

- Hrisostomia Iakovou

- Round 1 – DNS (did not advance)

Women's 400 m Hurdles

- Chrysoula Gountenoudi

- Round 1 – 01:01.59 (did not advance)

Women's 4 × 100 m

- Ekaterini Koffa, Paraskevi Patoulidou, Effrosyni Patsou, Ekaterini Thanou

- Round 1 – 43.46
- Semifinal – 43.53 (did not advance)

Women's Shot Put

- Kalliopi Ouzouni

- Qualifying – 18.56
- Final – 18.63 (7th place)

Women's Discus

- Anastasia Kelesidou

- Qualifying – 63.64
- Final – 65.71 (silver medal)

- Styliani Tsikouna

- Qualifying – 61.59
- Final – 64.08 (5th place)

- Aikaterini Vongoli

- Qualifying – 61.29
- Final – 61.57 (9th place)

Women's Javelin Throw

- Mirella Maniani-Tzelili

- Qualifying – 63.34
- Final – 67.51 (silver medal)

- Angeliki Tsiolakoudi

- Qualifying – 58.11 (did not advance)

Women's Long Jump

- Niki Xanthou

- Qualifying – 6.50 (did not advance)

- Despoina Papavasilaki

- Qualifying – 5.86 (did not advance)

Women's Triple Jump

- Olga-Anastasia Vasdeki

- Qualifying – 14.26
- Final – 14.15 (7th place)

Women's High Jump

- Niki Bakogianni

- Qualifying – 1.80 (did not advance)

Women's Pole Vault

- Thalia Iakovidou

- Qualifying – NM (did not advance)

Women's 20 km Walk

- Athina Papayianni

- Final – 1:33:14 (11th place)

- Christina Kokotou

- Final – 1:38:52 (36th place)

Women's Heptathlon

- Asimina Vanakara

- 100 m Hurdles – 14.19
- High Jump – 1.69
- Shot Put – 10.74
- 200 m – 25.78
- Long Jump – NM
- Javelin Throw – DNS

== Boxing ==
Men's Bantamweight (– 54 kg)

- Artour Mikaelian

- Round 1 – Lost to George Olteanu of Romania (did not advance)

Men's Lightweight (– 60 kg)

- Tigran Ouzlian

- Round 1 – Bye
- Round 2 – Defeated Asghar Ali Shah of Pakistan
- Quarterfinal – Lost to Mario Kindelán of Cuba (did not advance)

Men's Middleweight (– 75 kg)

- Antonios Giannoulas

- Round 1 – Defeated Ottavio Barone of Italy
- Round 2 – Lost to Jorge Gutiérrez of Cuba (did not advance)

== Canoeing ==
=== Flatwater ===
==== Men's competition ====
Men's Canoe Singles 500 m

- Andreas Kiligkaridis

- Qualifying Heat – 01:57.858 (did not advance)

Men's Canoe Singles 1000 m

- Andreas Kiligkaridis

- Qualifying Heat – 04:01.042
- Semifinal – DSQ (did not advance)

== Cycling ==
=== Track Cycling ===
Men's Sprint

- Nikolaos Angelidis

- Qualifying – 10.745
- Repechage – 2nd place – Heat 3
- First round – Lost to Florian Rousseau of France

Men's 1 km Time Trial

- Dimitrios Georgalis

- Final – 01:04.018 (6th place)

Men's Keirin

- Lampros Vasilopoulos

- First round – Heat – 1; Place – 4 (did not advance)
- Repechage – Heat – 3; Place – 2 (did not advance)
- Second round – Heat – 1; DNF (did not advance)

Men's Olympic Sprint

- Lampros Vasilopoulos, Dimitrios Georgalis, Kleanthis Bargkas

- Qualifying – 45.207
- Second round – 45.079
- Final – 45.332 (4th place)

== Diving ==
Men's 3 Metre Springboard

- Thomas Bimis

- Preliminary – 324.72 (32nd place, did not advance)

Men's 3 Metre Springboard

- Nikolaos Siranidis

- Preliminary – 317.88 (36th place, did not advance)

Women's 3 Metre Springboard

- Sotiria Koutsopetrou

- Preliminary – 258.81 (21st place, did not advance)

Women's 10 Metre Platform

- Eftihia Pappa

- Preliminary – 236.79 (29th place, did not advance)

Women's 10 Metre Platform

- Maria Konstantatou

- Preliminary – 189.57 (38th place, did not advance)

== Gymnastics ==
=== Rhythmic ===
Athlete	Event	Qualification						Final					
Athlete	Event	Rope	Hoop	Ball	Ribbon	Total	Rank	Hoop	Ball	Clubs	Ribbon	Total	Rank
Evmorfia Dona	Individual	9.675	9.725	9.725	9.708	38.833	10 Q	9.766	9.716	9.775	9.725	38.982	7

Athlete	Event	Qualification						Final					
Athlete	Event	10 clubs	Rank	3 hoops 2 balls	Rank	Total	Rank	10 clubs	Rank	3 hoops 2 balls	Rank	Total	Rank
Eirini Aindili; Evangelia Christodoulou; Maria Georgatou; Zacharoula Karyami; Charikleia Pantazi; Anna Pollatou	Team	19.700	1	19.700	1	3 Q	39.400	19.550	3	19.733	1	39.283	

== Modern pentathlon ==
Greece sent only one pentathlete to the first Olympic women's competition.

Women's:

- Katalin Partics – 3700 pts, 22nd place

== Sailing ==
Greece sent seven men and four women to the Sailing competition at the 2000 Sydney Olympics.

Men

Athlete	Event	Race											Net points	Final rank
Athlete	Event	1	2	3	4	5	6	7	8	9	10	11	Net points	Final rank
Nikolaos Kaklamanakis	Mistral	~~20~~	12	5	9	7	6	4	~~DSQ~~	7	13	1	64	6
Aimilios Papathanasiou	Finn	4	12	5	~~23~~	10	12	15	11	14	~~24~~	9	92	12
Andreas Kosmatopoulos; Konstantinos Trigkonis	470	13	7	~~21~~	6	3	8	~~24~~	19	14	2	6	78	8

Women

Athlete	Event	Race											Net points	Final rank
Athlete	Event	1	2	3	4	5	6	7	8	9	10	11	Net points	Final rank
Angeliki Skarlatou	Mistral	22	20	15	18	13	~~23~~	~~24~~	15	23	16	17	159	21
Maria Vlakhou	Europe	23	12	10	4	~~27~~	~~26~~	18	5	18	21	18	129	18
Sofia Bekatorou; Emilia Tsoulfa	470	2	8	17	12	9	12	2	5	~~DSQ~~	~~18~~	9	76	14

Open

Athlete	Event	Race											Net points	Final rank
Athlete	Event	1	2	3	4	5	6	7	8	9	10	11	Net points	Final rank
Antonios Bougiouris	Laser	16	18	8	12	21	8	~~32~~	6	7	15	~~22~~	111	15
Leonidas Pelekanakis; Dimitrios Boukis	Star	6	11	~~15~~	~~14~~	12	13	5	11	9	6	7	80	11

== Swimming ==
Men's 100 m Freestyle

- Spyridon Bitsakis

- Preliminary Heat – 51.28 (did not advance)

Men's 200 m Freestyle

- Dimitrios Manganas

- Preliminary Heat – 1:54.36 (did not advance)

Men's 400 m Freestyle

- Spyridon Gianniotis

- Preliminary Heat – 03:54.96 (did not advance)

Men's 1500 m Freestyle

- Spyridon Gianniotis

- Preliminary Heat – 15:29.69 (did not advance)

Men's 100 m Butterfly

- Ioannis Drymonakos

- Preliminary Heat – 56.36 (did not advance)

Men's 200 m Butterfly

- Ioannis Drymonakos

- Preliminary Heat – 02:00.75 (did not advance)

Men's 200 m Individual Medley

- Ioannis Kokkodis

- Preliminary Heat – 02:04.04 (did not advance)

Men's 400 m Individual Medley

- Ioannis Kokkodis

- Preliminary Heat – 04:23.19 (did not advance)

Men's 4 × 200 m Freestyle

- Spyridon Bitsakis, Spyridon Gianniotis, Dimitrios Manganas, Athanasios Oikonomou

- Preliminary Heat – 07:35.77 (did not advance)

Women's 50 m Freestyle

- Athina Bochori

- Preliminary Heat – 26.9 (did not advance)

Women's 100 m Freestyle

- Antonia Machaira

- Preliminary Heat – 57.24 (did not advance)

Women's 200 m Freestyle

- Zoi Dimoschaki

- Preliminary Heat – 02:04.06 (did not advance)

Women's 400 m Freestyle

- Artemis Dafni

- Preliminary Heat – 04:16.94 (did not advance)

Women's 800 m Freestyle

- Marianna Lymperta

- Preliminary Heat – 08:56.33 (did not advance)

Women's 100 m Butterfly

- Zampia Melachroinou

- Preliminary Heat – 01:02.06 (did not advance)

Women's 200 m Butterfly

- Zampia Melachroinou

- Preliminary Heat – 02:17.60 (did not advance)

Women's 100 m Backstroke

- Aikaterini Bliamou

- Preliminary Heat – 01:05.09 (did not advance)

Women's 200 m Backstroke

- Aikaterini Bliamou

- Preliminary Heat – 02:18.07 (did not advance)

Women's 200 m Individual Medley

- Aikaterini Sarakatsani

- Preliminary Heat – 02:23.05 (did not advance)

Women's 400 m Individual Medley

- Artemis Dafni

- Preliminary Heat – 04:53.52 (did not advance)

== Synchronized swimming ==
Duet:

- Christina Thalassinidou and Despoina Theodoridou – 90.363 pts (13th place, did not advance)

== Taekwondo ==
Men's Under 58 kg:

- Michail Mouroutsos – Gold medal

- Preminaly 1 – Defeated Talaat Abada of Egypt (5-0)
- Preminaly 2 – Defeated Huan Chih-Hsiung of Chinese Taipei (2-1)
- Preminaly 3 – Defeated Gabriel Alberto Taraburelli of Argentina (2-1)
- Final – Defeated Gabriel Espareza of Spain (4-2)

Men's over 80 kg:

- Alexandros Nikolaidis

- Preminaly 1 – Defeated Donald Ravenscroft of South Africa (WDR)
- Preminaly 2 – Lost to Milton Castro of Colombia (RSC)

Women's Under 57 kg:

- Areti Athanasopoulou

- Preminaly 1 – Defeated Shimaa Afifi of Egypt (7-7, SUP)
- Preminaly 2 – Lost to Virginia Lourens of Netherlands (6-8, PTS)

== Triathlon ==
Men's Individual Competition:

- Vassilis Krommidas – 1:51:28.94 (→ 33rd place)

== Volleyball ==
- Vasso Karadassiou and Efi Sfyri – 17th place (tied)

== Water polo ==
Men Team Competition

=== Group B ===
Pos	Team	Pld	W	D	L	GF	GA	GD	Pts	Qualification
1	FR Yugoslavia	5	4	1	0	41	22	+19	9	Quarter Finals
2	Croatia	5	4	1	0	42	30	+12	9	Quarter Finals
3	Hungary	5	3	0	2	49	39	+10	6	Quarter Finals
4	United States	5	2	0	3	42	39	+3	4	Quarter Finals
5	Netherlands	5	1	0	4	34	55	−21	2	
6	Greece	5	0	0	5	22	45	−23	0	

Source: LA84
Rules for classification: 1) Points; 2) Head-to-head points; 3) Head-to-head goal difference; 4) Head-to-head goals scored; 5) Goal difference.

23 September 2000; 09:30	Greece	4–7	Hungary	Ryde Aquatic Leisure Centre; Referees: Kratochvil (SVK), Balfanbayev (KAZ)
23 September 2000; 09:30	Score by quarters: 0–3, 1–2, 2–0, 1–2			Ryde Aquatic Leisure Centre; Referees: Kratochvil (SVK), Balfanbayev (KAZ)

24 September 2000; 19:15	Greece	5–9	Croatia	Ryde Aquatic Leisure Centre; Referees: Turcotte (CAN), Afanasiev (RUS)
24 September 2000; 19:15	Score by quarters: 2–3, 1–2, 1-1, 1–3			Ryde Aquatic Leisure Centre; Referees: Turcotte (CAN), Afanasiev (RUS)

25 September 2000; 19:15	FR Yugoslavia	10–3	Greece	Ryde Aquatic Leisure Centre; Referees: Kerr (AUS), Balfanbayev (KAZ)
25 September 2000; 19:15	Score by quarters: 4–2, 2–1, 3–0, 1–0			Ryde Aquatic Leisure Centre; Referees: Kerr (AUS), Balfanbayev (KAZ)

26 September 2000; 14:30	Greece	7–10	Netherlands	Ryde Aquatic Leisure Centre; Referees: Prikhodko (KAZ), Bower (AUS)
26 September 2000; 14:30	Score by quarters: 2–3, 2–3, 1–2, 2-2			Ryde Aquatic Leisure Centre; Referees: Prikhodko (KAZ), Bower (AUS)

27 September 2000; 19:15	Greece	3–9	United States	Ryde Aquatic Leisure Centre; Referees: Clemencon (FRA), Tulga (TUR)
27 September 2000; 19:15	Score by quarters: 0–2, 0–3, 0–2, 3–2			Ryde Aquatic Leisure Centre; Referees: Clemencon (FRA), Tulga (TUR)

=== Classification 9th-12th ===
Team	Pld	W	L	D	GF	GA	GD	Pts
Kazakhstan	3	2	0	1	23	18	+5	5
Greece	3	1	0	2	24	20	+4	4
Netherlands	3	1	1	1	19	20	-1	3
Slovakia	3	0	3	0	24	32	-8	0

29 September 2000; 09:30	Kazakhstan	6–6	Greece	Ryde Aquatic Leisure Centre; Referees: Schwartz (ISR), Menendez Betancourt (CUB)
29 September 2000; 09:30	Score by quarters: 0–3, 3–1, 1–2, 2–0			Ryde Aquatic Leisure Centre; Referees: Schwartz (ISR), Menendez Betancourt (CUB)

30 September 2000; 11:15	Netherlands	6–6	Greece	Ryde Aquatic Leisure Centre; Referees: Klaric (CRO), Csaszar (HUN)
30 September 2000; 11:15	Score by quarters: 0–2, 2–1, 1–3, 3-0			Ryde Aquatic Leisure Centre; Referees: Klaric (CRO), Csaszar (HUN)

1 October 2000; 9:00	Slovakia	8–12	Greece	Ryde Aquatic Leisure Centre; Referees: Takata (USA), Moradi Shahpar (IRI)
1 October 2000; 9:00	Score by quarters: 2–3, 4–3, 1-1, 1-5			Ryde Aquatic Leisure Centre; Referees: Takata (USA), Moradi Shahpar (IRI)

- Team Roster

- George Mavrotas
- Filippos Kaiafas
- Theodoros Lorantos
- Konstantinos Loudis
- Georgios Afroudakis
- Thomas Khatzis
- Theodoros Chatzitheodorou
- Georgios Psykhos
- Nikolaos Deligiannis
- Dimitrios Mazis
- Georgios Reppas
- Ioannis Thomakos
- Antonios Vlontakis

== Weightlifting ==
Men

Athlete	Event	Snatch		Clean & Jerk		Total	Rank
Athlete	Event	Result	Rank	Result	Rank	Total	Rank
Leonidas Sabanis	Men's −62 kg	147.5	2	170.0	4	317.5	2nd place, silver medalist(s)
Valerios Leonidis	Men's −69 kg	145.0	10	185.0	4	330.0	6
Viktor Mitrou	Men's −77 kg	165.0	3	202.5	2	367.5	2nd place, silver medalist(s)
Pyrros Dimas	Men's −85 kg	175.0	4	215.0	1	390.0	1st place, gold medalist(s)
Christos Spyrou	Men's −85 kg	170.0	6	205.0	6	375.0	7
Kakhi Kakhiashvili	Men's −94 kg	185.0	2	220.0	3	405.0	1st place, gold medalist(s)

Women

Athlete	Event	Snatch		Clean & Jerk		Total	Rank
Athlete	Event	Result	Rank	Result	Rank	Total	Rank
Ioanna Khatziioannou	Women's −63 kg	97.5	4	125.0	3	222.5	3rd place, bronze medalist(s)
Maria Tatsi	Women's −69 kg	92.5	11	127.5	7	220.0	11

== Wrestling ==
Men
