= Gymnastics at the 2000 Summer Olympics – Women's rhythmic group all-around =

Women's rhythmic group all-around at the Games of the XXVII Olympiad

Medalists
1st place, gold medalist(s)		Irina Belova; Yelena Chalamova; Natalia Lavrova; Mariya Netesova; Vyera Shimanskaya; Irina Zilber	Russia
2nd place, silver medalist(s)		Tatyana Ananko; Tatyana Belan; Anna Glazkova; Irina Ilyenkova; Maria Lazuk; Olga Puzhevich	Belarus
3rd place, bronze medalist(s)		Eirini Aindili; Evangelia Christodoulou; Maria Georgatou; Zacharoula Karyami; Charikleia Pantazi; Anna Pollatou	Greece

These are the results of the rhythmic group all-around competition, one of the two events of the rhythmic gymnastics discipline contested in the gymnastics at the 2000 Summer Olympics in Sydney.

== Qualification ==
Ten national teams, each composed by six gymnasts, competed in the group all-around event in the rhythmic gymnastics qualification round. The eight highest scoring teams advanced to the final.

== Final ==
Rank	Team	5	3 + 2	Total
1st place, gold medalist(s)	Russia	19.800 (=1)	19.700 (=2)	39.500; TBP: 39.520
2nd place, silver medalist(s)	Belarus	19.800 (=1)	19.700 (=2)	39.500; TBP: 39.500
3rd place, bronze medalist(s)	Greece	19.550 (3)	19.733 (1)	39.283
4	Germany	19.533 (4)	19.366 (4)	38.899
5	Japan	19.350 (5)	19.200 (=7)	38.550
6	Italy	19.250 (6)	19.233 (6)	38.483
7	Bulgaria	19.166 (7)	19.266 (5)	38.432
8	Brazil	19.066 (8)	19.200 (=7)	38.266
