= Irina Belova =

Irina Belova may refer to:

- Irina Belova (heptathlete) (born 1968), Russian heptathlete
- Irina Belova (rhythmic gymnast) (born 1980), Russian rhythmic gymnast
