= Ananko =

Ananko (Russian: Ана́нко) is a surname. Notable people with the surname include:

- Dmitri Ananko (born 1973), Russian footballer and coach
- Lyudmila Ananko (born 1982), Belarusian biathlete
- Tatyana Ananko (born 1984), Belarusian rhythmic gymnast
