= Zuzana Kubalová =

Czech rhythmic gymnast

Zuzana Kubalová (born 17 August 1988) is a Czech rhythmic gymnast.

She competed at the 2005 World Rhythmic Gymnastics Championships,

== See also ==
- European Team Gymnastics Championships
- Gymnastics at the European Games
- List of notable rhythmic gymnasts
- List of medalists at the UEG European Cup Final
- List of Olympic medalists in gymnastics (women)
- List of Olympic medalists in rhythmic gymnastics
- Major achievements in gymnastics by nation
- Rhythm and dance
- Rhythmic Gymnastics European Championships
- Rhythmic Gymnastics World Cup
- World Rhythmic Gymnastics Championships
