= Heini Lautala =

Finnish rhythmic gymnast

- Full name: Heini-Maria Lautala
- Born: 28 August 1977 (age 49) Vehkalahti, present Hamina, Kymenlaakso, Finland
- Height: 166 cm (5 ft 5 in) (at the 2000 Olympics)

Gymnastics career
- Discipline: Rhythmic gymnastics
- Country represented: Finland
- Club: Voimistelu- ja urheiluseura Elise, Helsinki

Heini Lautala (born 28 August 1977 in Vehkalahti in present Hamina) is a Finnish rhythmic gymnast.

Lautala competed for Finland in the rhythmic gymnastics individual all-around competition at the 2000 Summer Olympics in Sydney. There she was 23rd in the qualification round and did not advance to the final.
