= Inga Tavdishvili =

Georgian rhythmic gymnast

- Born: July 20, 1982 (age 44) Rustavi, Kvemo Kartli, Georgia
- Height: 170 cm (5 ft 7 in) (at the 2000 Olympics)

Gymnastics career
- Discipline: Rhythmic gymnastics
- Country represented: Georgia
- Club: Avrora

Inga Tavdishvili (Georgian: ინგა თავდიშვილი; born July 20, 1982, in Rustavi) is a Georgian rhythmic gymnast.

Tavdishvili competed for Georgia in the rhythmic gymnastics individual all-around competition at the 2000 Summer Olympics in Sydney. There she was 21st in the qualification round and did not advance to the final.
