= Agnieszka Brandebura =

Polish rhythmic gymnast (born 1981)

- Born: 16 April 1981 (age 45) Łódź, Łódź Voivodeship, Poland
- Height: 172 cm (5 ft 8 in) (at the 2000 Olympics)

Gymnastics career
- Discipline: Rhythmic gymnastics
- Country represented: Poland
- Club: RTS Widzew

Agnieszka Brandebura (born 16 April 1981 in Łódź) is a Polish rhythmic gymnast.

Brandebura competed for Poland in the rhythmic gymnastics individual all-around competition at the 2000 Summer Olympics in Sydney. There she was 13th in the qualification round and didn't advance to the final of 10 competitors.
