= Artemis Dafni =

Greek swimmer (born 1983)

Personal information
- Full name: Artemis Daphnis
- National team: Greece
- Born: November 18, 1983 (age 42) Berkeley, California, U.S.
- Height: 1.71 m (5 ft 7 in)
- Weight: 60 kg (132 lb)

Sport
- Sport: Swimming
- Strokes: Freestyle, medley
- College team: University of Arizona (U.S.)
- Coach: Frank Busch (U.S.)

Artemis Dafni (also Artemis Daphnis, Greek: Αρτεμις Δάφνη; born November 18, 1983) is a Greek-American former competition swimmer who specialized in middle-distance freestyle and individual medley events. She represented Greece, as a 16-year-old, at the 2000 Summer Olympics, and also competed for the University of Arizona's Arizona Wildcats swimming and diving team.

Dafni made her sporting debut at the 2000 FINA World Short Course Championships in Athens, Greece, where she finished sixth in the 400 m individual medley (4:42.49), and seventh in the 400 m freestyle (4:11.04).

Six months later, at the 2000 Summer Olympics in Sydney, Dafni competed again in the same events by achieving FINA B-standards of 4:17.36 (400 m freestyle) and 4:50.50 (400 m individual medley) from the Janet Evans Invitational in Los Angeles. She placed twentieth in the 400 m individual medley (4:53.52) and twenty-second in the 400 m freestyle (4:16.94, her lifetime best).

A graduate of Homestead High School in Cupertino, California, Dafni accepted an athletic scholarship to attend the University of Arizona in Tucson, Arizona, where she competed for the Arizona Wildcats swimming and diving team, under head coach Frank Busch, from 2001 to 2003. While swimming for the Wildcats, she posted career bests in the 1000-yard freestyle (9:57.58), and 400-yard individual medley (4:17.57) to capture both titles at the 2002 NCAA Women's Swimming and Diving Championships.

In late 2002, Dafni transferred to San Francisco State University in San Francisco, California, where she majored in and eventually graduated with a Bachelor of Arts degree in business aspects of radio, television, and in marketing, signaling the end of her sporting career. Currently, she works as a marketing manager for Analogix Semiconductor, Inc.
