= Krystsina Markovich =

Belarusian synchronized swimmer (born 1978)

Personal information
- Full name: Krystsina Yurieuna Markovich
- National team: Belarus
- Born: Krystsina Yurieuna Nadzedzina; 19 June 1978 (age 48) Minsk, Soviet Union
- Height: 170 cm (5 ft 7 in)
- Weight: 55 kg (121 lb)

Sport
- Sport: Synchronized swimming

Krystsina Yurieuna Markovich (Belarusian: Крысціна Юр’еўа Марковіч; Russian: Кристина Юрьевна Маркович; born on 19 June 1978), is a Belarusian former synchronized swimmer. She competed at the 2000 and 2004 Summer Olympics.
