= Natallia Sakharuk =

Belarusian synchronized swimmer

Personal information
- Full name: Natallia Aliakseyeuna Sakharuk
- National team: Belarus
- Born: 27 July 1973 (age 52) Minsk, Soviet Union
- Height: 165 cm (5 ft 5 in)
- Weight: 53 kg (117 lb)

Sport
- Sport: Synchronized swimming

Natallia Aliakseyeuna Sakharuk (Belarusian: Наталля Аляксееўна Сахарук; Russian: Наталья Алексеевна Сахарук; born on 27 July 1973), is a Belarusian former synchronized swimmer. She had competed at the 2000 Summer Olympics in Sydney.
