= Anne-Sophie Lavoine =

French rhythmic gymnast (born 1981)

- Born: 20 June 1981 (age 45) Calais, France
- Height: 165 cm (5 ft 5 in)

Gymnastics career
- Discipline: Rhythmic gymnastics
- Country represented: France (1998–2000)
- Head coach: Valérie Bonvoisin
- Former coach: Maria Guigova

Anne-Sophie Lavoine (born 20 June 1981) is a French rhythmic gymnast. She represented France at the Olympic Games in 2000

== Career ==
In 2000 Lavoine was part of the French group that competed at the Olympic Games held in Sydney, Australia. They scored 37.900 points in the qualifying round with teammates Anne-Sophie Doyen, Anne-Laure Klein, Magalie Poisson, Laetitia Mancieri and Vanessa Sauzede. They finished in ninth place after qualification, not managing to reach the final.
