= Laura Trefiletti =

Italian gymnast

Personal information
- Nationality: Italian
- Born: 31 December 1984 (age 40); Milan, Italy

Sport
- Sport: Gymnastics

Laura Trefiletti (born 31 December 1984) is an Italian gymnast. She competed at the 2000 Summer Olympics.
