= Gymnastics at the 2000 Summer Olympics – Women's rhythmic individual all-around =

Women's rhythmic individual all-around at the Games of the XXVII Olympiad

Medalists
1st place, gold medalist(s)		Yulia Barsukova	Russia
2nd place, silver medalist(s)		Yulia Raskina	Belarus
3rd place, bronze medalist(s)		Alina Kabaeva	Russia

These are the results of the rhythmic individual all-around competition, one of two Rhythmic Gymnastic events at the 2000 Summer Olympics.

== Qualification ==
24 athletes from 19 countries competed in the qualification round. The limit was two athletes per country. The top 10 would go on to compete in the final.

Rank	Name	Rope	Hoop	Ball	Ribbon	Total	
1	Alina Kabaeva (RUS)	9.916	9.925	9.925	9.925	39.691	Q
2	Yulia Raskina (BLR)	9.900	9.908	9.908	9.908	39.624	Q
3	Yulia Barsukova (RUS)	9.900	9.900	9.900	9.900	39.600	Q
4	Eva Serrano (FRA)	9.875	9.875	9.833	9.900	39.483	Q
5	Olena Vitrichenko (UKR)	9.850	9.800	9.866	9.883	39.399	Q
6	Valeria Vatkina (BLR)	9.750	9.733	9.775	9.800	39.058	Q
7	Susanna Marchesi (ITA)	9.725	9.725	9.741	9.733	38.924	Q
8	Tamara Yerofeeva (UKR)	9.725	9.750	9.716	9.708	38.899	Q
9	Almudena Cid Tostado (ESP)	9.691	9.708	9.733	9.716	38.848	Q
10	Dona Evmorfia (GRE)	9.675	9.725	9.725	9.708	38.833	Q

== Final ==
Rank	Name	Nation	Rope (rhythmic gymnastics)	Hoop (rhythmic gymnastics)	Ball (rhythmic gymnastics)	Ribbon (rhythmic gymnastics)	Total
1st place, gold medalist(s)	Yulia Barsukova	Russia	9.883 (3)	9.900 (1)	9.916 (3)	9.933 (2)	39.632
2nd place, silver medalist(s)	Yulia Raskina	Belarus	9.908 (2)	9.791 (4)	9.933 (2)	9.916 (3)	39.548
3rd place, bronze medalist(s)	Alina Kabaeva	Russia	9.925 (1)	9.641 (9)	9.950 (1)	9.950 (1)	39.466
4	Olena Vitrychenko	Ukraine	9.825 (5)	9.883 (2)	9.875 (4)	9.875 (4)	39.408
5	Eva Serrano	France	9.841 (4)	9.850 (3)	9.841 (5)	9.858 (5)	39.390
6	Tamara Yerofeeva	Ukraine	9.750 (=8)	9.750 (=5)	9.750 (8)	9.750 (=6)	39.000
7	Evmorfia Dona	Greece	9.766 (7)	9.716 (8)	9.775 (=6)	9.725 (=9)	38.982
8	Valeria Vatkina	Belarus	9.791 (6)	9.750 (=5)	9.666 (10)	9.750 (=6)	38.957
9	Almudena Cid	Spain	9.750 (=8)	9.725 (7)	9.691 (9)	9.741 (8)	38.907
10	Susanna Marchesi	Italy	9.750 (=8)	9.600 (10)	9.775 (=6)	9.725 (=9)	38.850
