= Mathieu Turgeon =

Canadian trampoline gymnast

- Born: August 2, 1979 (age 47) Pointe-Claire, Quebec, Canada

Gymnastics career
- Discipline: Trampoline gymnastics
- Country represented: Canada
- Retired: 2007
Medal record
Olympic Games
| Bronze medal – third place | 2000 Sydney | Trampoline |

Mathieu Turgeon (born August 2, 1979) is a Canadian trampoline gymnast, born in Pointe-Claire, Quebec.

Turgeon won a bronze medal at the 2000 Summer Olympics in individual trampoline and qualified for the 2004 Summer Olympics but failed to make the final. He is noted for performing very difficult routines.

Turgeon retired from competition in 2007 to pursue a career as a chiropractor, though he still performs in trampoline demonstrations.
