= Viktória Fráter =

Hungarian rhythmic gymnast

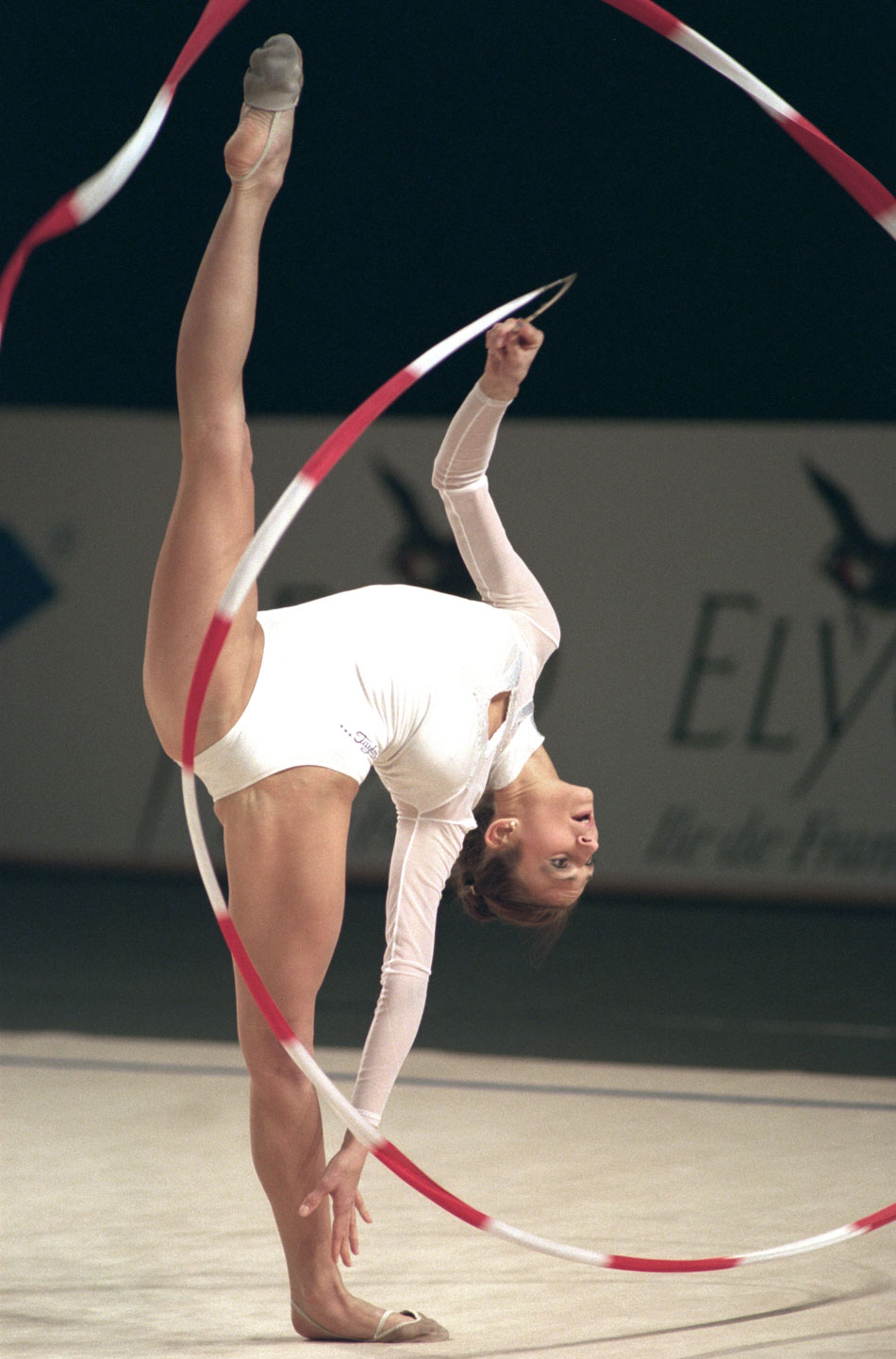
- Viktória Fráter in 2000

Personal information
- Born: August 30, 1977 (age 49) Budapest, Hungary
- Height: 165 cm (5 ft 5 in)

Gymnastics career
- Discipline: Rhythmic gymnastics
- Country represented: Hungary
- Club: OSC, Budapest

Viktória Fráter (born August 30, 1977, Budapest) is a retired Hungarian rhythmic gymnast.

She represented Hungary in the rhythmic gymnastics individual all-around competition at three Olympic Games: in 1992 in Barcelona, in 1996 in Atlanta, and in 2000 in Sydney. In 1992 she was 24th in the qualification round and did not advance to the final, in 1996 she was 23rd in the qualification round and did not advance to the semifinal, in 2000 she was 20th in the qualification round and did not advance to the final.
