= Silvia Gregorini =

Italian gymnast (born 1983)

- Born: 19 February 1983 (age 43) La Spezia, Italy
- Height: 165 cm (5 ft 5 in)

Gymnastics career
- Discipline: Rhythmic gymnastics
- Country represented: Italy; (?-2000)
- Club: Ginnastica Rubattino
- Head coach: Emanuela Maccarani
- Retired: yes

Silvia Gregorini (born 18 February 1983) is a retired Italian rhythmic gymnast.

== Career ==
Silvia took up the sport at Ginnastica Rubattino. In 1998 she integrated the national senior group, competing at the World Championships, being 7th in the All-Around, 5th with 5 balls and 8th with 3 ribbons and 2 hoops. In 1999 she was 9th in the All-Around and 7th with 3 ribbons and 2 hoops at the European Championships. At the World Championships the group took 6th place in the All-Around and 8th in both event finals. Her biggest achievement was competing at the 2000 Olympic Games in Sydney as a member of the Italian group. There along Elena Amato, Eva D'Amore, Noemi Iezzi, Roberta Lucentini and Arianna Rusca placed 8th in preliminaries and 6th in the final.

After her retirement she works as a physiotherapist in her native La Spezia.
