= Beatriz Nogalez =

Spanish rhythmic gymnast

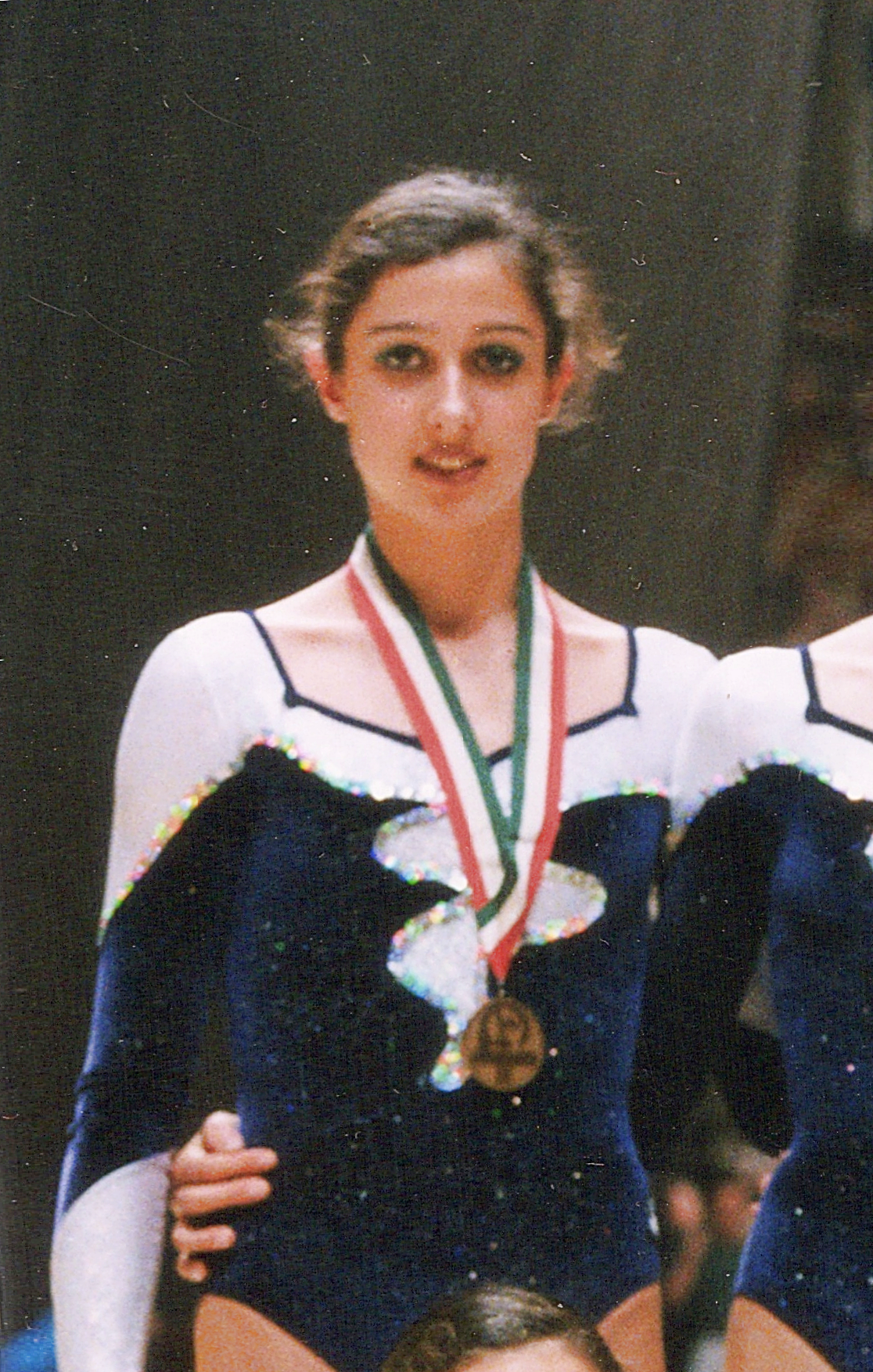

Personal information
- Nationality: Spanish
- Born: 3 March 1983 (age 42); Álava, Spain

Sport
- Sport: Rhythmic gymnastics

Beatriz Nogalez González (born 3 March 1983) is a Spanish rhythmic gymnast, born in Álava. She competed at the 2000 Summer Olympics in Sydney.
