= Magalie Poisson =

French rhythmic gymnast (born 1982)

- Born: 9 March 1982 (age 44) Saint-Cloud, Hauts-de-Seine, France
- Height: 168 cm (5 ft 6 in)

Gymnastics career
- Discipline: Rhythmic gymnastics
- Country represented: France (1998-2000)
- Head coach: Valérie Bonvoisin
- Former coach: Maria Guigova

Magalie Poisson (born 9 March 1982) is a French rhythmic gymnast. She represented France at the Olympic Games in 2000

== Career ==
She competed as an individual at the junior european championship in 1995, before being incorporated into the group in 1998. In 2000 Poisson was selected as a member of the French group to compete at the Olympic Games held in Sydney, Australia. They scored 37.900 points in the qualifying round with teammates Anna-Sofie Doyen, Anne-Laure Klein, Anne-Sophie Lavoine, Laetitia Mancieri and Vanessa Sauzede. They finished in ninth place after qualification, not managing to reach the final. After her sport career, she began a short career as a model in parallel with her physiotherapy and hosteopathy studies (around 2000 until 2020). 2010 she got married and had two children (one in 2012 and another in 2015), then divorced in 2018. Poisson had another child in 2018 at the age of 36.
