= Aleksandr Kruzhilov =

Belarusian gymnast (born 1980)

- Born: 28 December 1980 (age 45) Zaporizhia, Ukraine

Gymnastics career
- Discipline: Men's artistic gymnastics
- Country represented: Belarus

Aleksandr Kruzhilov (born 28 December 1980) is a Belarusian gymnast. He competed at the 2000 Summer Olympics.
