= Roberta Lucentini =

Italian rhythmic gymnast (born 1983)

- Born: 2 December 1983 (age 42) Chieti, Italy
- Height: 167 cm (5 ft 6 in)

Gymnastics career
- Discipline: Rhythmic gymnastics
- Country represented: Italy
- Club: Armonia d'Abruzzo
- Head coach: Emanuela Maccarani
- Former coach: Germana Germani
- Retired: yes

Roberta Lucentini (born 2 December 1983) is a retired Italian rhythmic gymnast.

== Biography ==
Roberta started her sport career at Armonia d'Abruzzo under Germana Germani. Her biggest achievement was competing at the 2000 Olympic Games in Sydney as a member of the Italian group. There along Elena Amato, Silvia Gregorini, Noemi Iezzi, Eva D'Amore and Arianna Rusca placed 8th in preliminaries and 6th in the final.
