= Carmina Verdú =

Spanish rhythmic gymnast

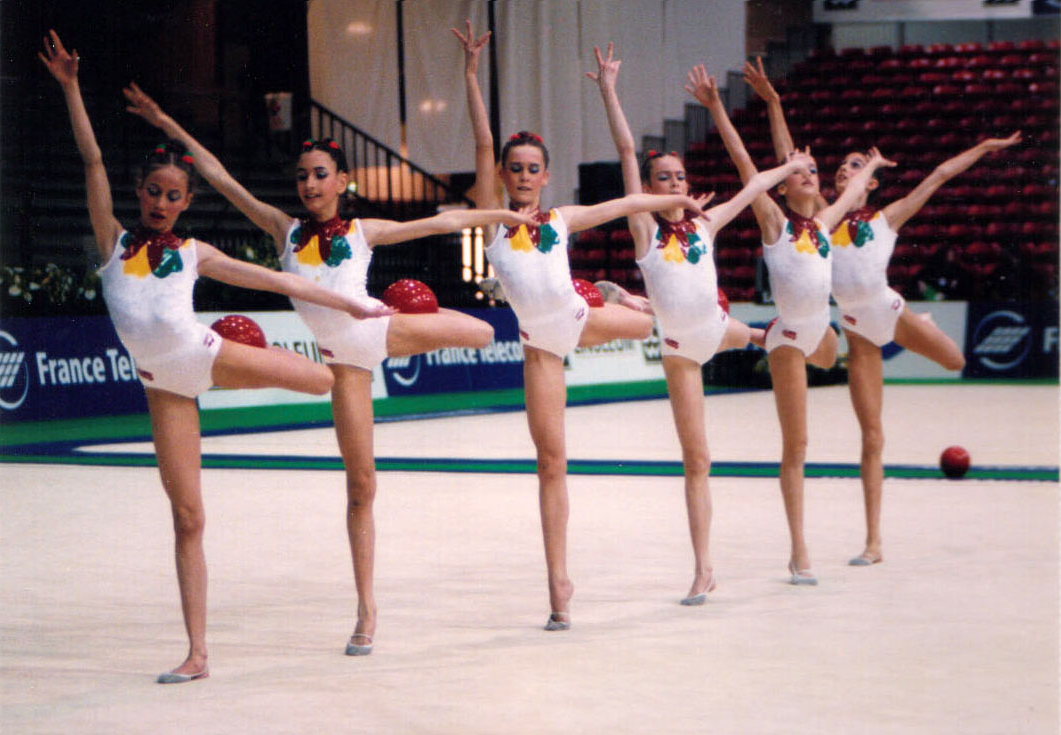
- Verdú (second from right) in 1996

Personal information
- Full name: Carmina Verdú Ferrer
- Born: 9 April 1983 (age 42); Valencia, Spain
- Height: 164 cm (5 ft 5 in)
- Weight: 44 kg (97 lb)

Sport
- Country: Spain
- Sport: Rhythmic gymnastics

Carmina Verdú Ferrer (Note: In this Spanish name, the first or paternal surname is Verdú and the second or maternal family name is Ferrer.) (born 9 April 1983) is a Spanish rhythmic gymnast, born in Valencia. She competed at the 2000 Summer Olympics in Sydney.
