= Elena Amato =

Italian gymnast (born 1983)

- Born: 5 November 1983 (age 42) Como, Italy
- Height: 165 cm (5 ft 5 in)

Gymnastics career
- Discipline: Rhythmic gymnastics
- Country represented: Italy
- Club: Ginnastica Comense 1872
- Head coach: Emanuela Maccarani
- Retired: yes

Elena Amato (born 5 November 1983) is a retired Italian rhythmic gymnast.

== Career ==
Amato started her sport career at Ginnastica Comense 1872. Her biggest achievement was competing at the 2000 Olympic Games in Sydney as a member of the Italian group. There, she and the other group members, Eva D'Amore, Silvia Gregorini, Noemi Iezzi, Roberta Lucentini and Arianna Rusca, placed 8th in preliminaries and 6th in the final.

After her retirement, she works as head coach for Ginnastica Loano.
