= Tatyana Grigorenko =

Belarusian gymnast (born 1984)

Personal information
- Nationality: Belarusian
- Born: 1 September 1984 (age 40); Grodno, Byelorussian SSR, Soviet Union

Sport
- Sport: Gymnastics

Tatyana Grigorenko (born 1 September 1984) is a Belarusian gymnast. She competed at the 2000 Summer Olympics.
