= Nataliya Naranovich =

Belarusian gymnast (born 1981)

Personal information
- Nationality: Belarusian
- Born: 1 August 1981 (age 43); Minsk, Belarus

Sport
- Sport: Gymnastics

Nataliya Naranovich (born 1 August 1981) is a Belarusian gymnast. She competed at the 2000 Summer Olympics.
