= Laetitia Mancieri =

French rhythmic gymnast

Vanessa Sauzede
- Born: 19 April 1983 (age 43) Vincennes, France
- Height: 163 cm (5 ft 4 in)

Gymnastics career
- Discipline: Rhythmic gymnastics
- Country represented: France (2000-?)

Laetitia Mancieri (born 19 April 1983) is a French rhythmic gymnast. She represented France at the Olympic Games in 2000.

== Career ==
In 2000 Mancieri was selected as a member of the French group to compete at the Olympic Games held in Sydney, Australia. They scored 37.900 points in the qualifying round with teammates Anna-Sofie Doyen, Anne-Laure Klein, Anna-Sophie Lavoine, Magalie Poisson and Vanessa Sauzede. They finished in ninth place after qualification, not managing to reach the final.
