= Igone Arribas =

Spanish rhythmic gymnast (born 1983)

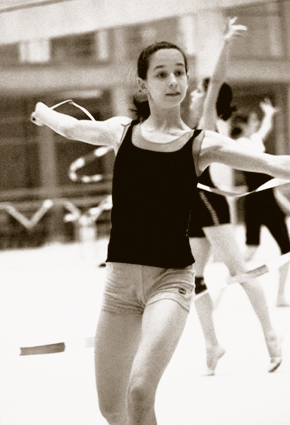

Personal information
- Nationality: Spanish
- Born: 22 July 1983 (age 42) Barakaldo, Spain

Sport
- Sport: Rhythmic gymnastics

Igone Arribas Bailón (born 22 July 1983) is a Spanish rhythmic gymnast, born in Barakaldo. She competed at the 2000 Summer Olympics in Sydney.
