= Eva D'Amore =

Italian gymnast (born 1981)

- Born: 18 September 1981 (age 44) Chieti, Italy
- Height: 167 cm (5 ft 6 in)

Gymnastics career
- Discipline: Rhythmic gymnastics
- Country represented: Italy
- Club: Armonia d'Abruzzo
- Head coach: Emanuela Maccarani
- Former coach: Germana Germani
- Retired: yes

Eva D'Amore (born 18 September 1981) is a retired Italian rhythmic gymnast.

== Career ==
D'Amore started her sport career at Armonia d'Abruzzo under Germana Germani. Her biggest achievement was competing at the 2000 Olympic Games in Sydney as a member of the Italian group. Along with Elena Amato, Silvia Gregorini, Noemi Iezzi, Roberta Lucentini and Arianna Rusca, the team placed 8th in preliminaries and 6th in the final.

After retiring, D'Amore was an assistant coach of the national team.
