= Vanessa Sauzede =

French rhythmic gymnast (born 1982)

- Born: 22 August 1982 (age 44) Paris, France
- Height: 173 cm (5 ft 8 in)

Gymnastics career
- Discipline: Rhythmic gymnastics
- Country represented: France; (2000)

Vanessa Sauzede (born 22 August 1982) is a French rhythmic gymnast. She represented France at the Olympic Games in 2000.

== Career ==
In 2000 Sauzede was selected as a member of the French group to compete at the Olympic Games held in Sydney, Australia. They scored 37.900 points in the qualifying round with teammates Anna-Sofie Doyen, Anne-Laure Klein, Anna-Sophie Lavoine, Laetitia Mancieri and Magalie Poisson and finished in ninth place not managing to reach the final.
