= Noemi Iezzi =

Italian gymnast (born 1982)

- Born: 5 November 1982 (age 43) Chieti, Italy
- Height: 165 cm (5 ft 5 in)

Gymnastics career
- Discipline: Rhythmic gymnastics
- Country represented: Italy
- Club: Armonia d'Abruzzo
- Head coach: Emanuela Maccarani
- Former coach: Germana Germani
- Retired: yes

Noemi Iezzi (born 5 November 1982) is a retired Italian rhythmic gymnast.

== Career ==
Iezzi started her sport career at Armonia d'Abruzzo under Germana Germani.

Her biggest achievement was competing at the 2000 Olympic Games in Sydney as a member of the Italian group. There she, along with her teammates, Elena Amato, Silvia Gregorini, Eva D'Amore, Roberta Lucentini and Arianna Rusca, placed 8th in preliminaries and 6th in the final.

After retiring she tried to pursue a career in television, participating in Uomini & Donne and being seen at Flavio Briatore's club the Billionaire. In 2012 she made the decision to return to rhythmic gymnastics as a coach.
