= Anne-Laure Klein =

French rhythmic gymnast (born 1983)

- Born: 14 November 1983 (age 42) Calais, France
- Height: 171 cm (5 ft 7 in)

Gymnastics career
- Discipline: Rhythmic gymnastics
- Country represented: France (1999-2000)
- Head coach: Valérie Bonvoisin

Anne-Laure Klein (born 14 November 1983) is a French rhythmic gymnast. She represented France at the Olympic Games in 2000.

== Career ==
Integrating the group in 1999, in 2000 Klein was part of the French group that competed at the Olympic Games held in Sydney, Australia. They scored 37.900 points in the qualifying round with teammates Anna-Sofie Doyen, Anne-Sophie Lavoine, Magalie Poisson, Laetitia Mancieri and Vanessa Sauzede. They finished in ninth place after qualification, not managing to reach the final.
