= Evangelia Christodoulou =

Greek rhythmic gymnast

Personal information
- Born: 27 September 1983 (age 42) Athens, Greece
- Height: 163 cm (5 ft 4 in)
- Weight: 45 kg (99 lb)
Medal record
Rhythmic gymnastics
Representing Greece
Olympic Games
Bronze medal – third place	2000 Sydney	Group All-around

Evangelia "Eva" Christodoulou (Greek: Ευαγγελία "Εύα" Χριστοδούλου; born 27 September 1983) is a Greek rhythmic gymnast. She won a bronze medal at the 2000 Summer Olympics.
