= Zacharoula Karyami =

Greek rhythmic gymnast (born 1983)

Personal information
- Born: 7 April 1983 (age 43) Athens, Greece
- Height: 166 cm (5 ft 5 in)
- Weight: 43 kg (95 lb)
Medal record
Rhythmic gymnastics
Representing Greece
Olympic Games
Bronze medal – third place	2000 Sydney	Group All-around

Zacharoula "Zara" Karyami (Greek: Ζαχαρουλα "Χαρά" Καρυάμη; born 7 April 1983 in Athens) is a Greek rhythmic gymnast. She won a bronze medal at the 2000 Summer Olympics.
