= Anne-Sophie Doyen =

- Born: 27 November 1983 (age 42) Cambrai, France
- Height: 173 cm (5 ft 8 in) (at the 2000 Olympics)

Gymnastics career
- Discipline: Rhythmic gymnastics
- Country represented: France (1996-2000)
- Head coach: Valérie Bonvoisin

Anne-Sophie Doyen (born 27 November 1983) is a former French rhythmic gymnast who was a member of national group from 1996 to 2000.

== Career ==
Anne-Sophie and the group were 15th at the World Championships in Seville.

In 1999 France was 4th in the All-Around and with 2 hoops and 3 ribbons, 6th with 5 pair of clubs at the European Championships in Budapest. In September the group was 8th in the All-Around and 5th with 2 hoops and 3 ribbons at the World Championships in Osaka.

In 2000, Anne-Sophie and the group placed 6th at the Thiais international tournament, 3rd in a tournament in Malaga, and won gold at the one in Liévin.

At the 2000 Olympic Games in Sidney France was 9th in qualification and didn't advance to the final. She retired from competition soon after, in 2007 she become a coach at the club of the university of Valenciennes.
