= Mariya Netesova =

Russian rhythmic gymnast (born 1983)

Medal record

Rhythmic gymnastics

Representing Russia

Olympic Games
Gold medal – first place	2000 Sydney	Group All-around

Mariya Vyacheslavovna Netesova (Russian: Мария Вячеславовна Нетесова (born 26 May 1983 in Yekaterinburg) is a Russian rhythmic gymnast. She won a gold medal at the 2000 Summer Olympics.
