= Yelena Shalamova =

Russian rhythmic gymnast (born 1982)

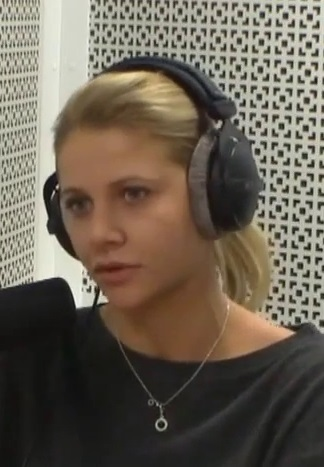

Personal information
- Born: 4 July 1982 (age 44) Astrakhan, RSFSR, USSR
Medal record
Rhythmic gymnastics
Representing Russia
Olympic Games
Gold medal – first place	2000 Sydney	Group All-around
Junior European Championships
Gold medal – first place	1995 Prague	Rope
Gold medal – first place	1995 Prague	Hoop
Gold medal – first place	1995 Prague	Clubs
Gold medal – first place	1995 Prague	Ribbon
Gold medal – first place	1995 Prague	Team
Bronze medal – third place	1995 Prague	All-Around
|}

Yelena Vladimirovna Shalamova (off. sp.: Elena Chalamova; Russian: Елена Владимировна Шаламова, born 4 July 1982 in Astrakhan) is a Russian rhythmic gymnast. She won a gold medal at the 2000 Summer Olympics.
