= Vera Shimanskaya =

Russian rhythmic gymnast (born 1981)

Medal record

Rhythmic gymnastics

Representing Russia

Olympic Games
Gold medal – first place	2000 Sydney	Group All-around

Vera Vladimirovna Shimanskaya (Russian: Вера Владимировна Шиманская, born 10 April 1981) is a Russian rhythmic gymnast. She won a gold medal at the 2000 Summer Olympics.
