= Irina Zilber =

Russian rhythmic gymnast (born 1983)

Personal information
- Born: November 18, 1983 (age 42)
Medal record
Rhythmic gymnastics
Representing Russia
Olympic Games
Gold medal – first place	2000 Sydney	Group All-around

Irina Zilber (Russian: Ирина Александровна Зильбер (born November 18, 1983, in Yekaterinburg) is a Russian rhythmic gymnast. She won a gold medal at the 2000 Summer Olympics.
