= Charikleia Pantazi =

Greek rhythmic gymnast

Personal information
- Native name: Χαρικλέια Πανταζή
- Born: 18 March 1985 (age 41) Athens, Greece
- Height: 164 cm (5 ft 5 in)
- Weight: 41 kg (90 lb)
Medal record
Rhythmic gymnastics
Representing Greece
Olympic Games
Bronze medal – third place	2000 Sydney	Group All-around

Charikleia Pantazi (Greek: Χαρικλέια Πανταζή; born 18 March 1985 in Athens) is a Greek rhythmic gymnast. She won a bronze medal at the 2000 Summer Olympics.
