= Evmorfia Dona =

Greek rhythmic gymnast

- Born: 23 August 1984 (age 42) Grevena, Greece
- Height: 5 ft 5.5 in (166.4 cm)

Gymnastics career
- Discipline: Rhythmic gymnastics
- Country represented: Greece (1999–2007 (?))
- Club: FO Proteas Grev.
Medal record
European Team Championships
Bronze medal – third place	1999 Patras	Team

Evmorfia Dona (also written as Evmorfia Ntona, Ευμορφία Ντώνα; born 23 August 1984, in Grevena) is a retired Greek individual and group rhythmic gymnast. She represents her nation at international competitions.

She participated at the 2000 Summer Olympics in Sydney. She also competed at world championships, including at the 1999, 2005 and 2007 World Rhythmic Gymnastics Championships.

As of 2022 she is the coach of Panagiota Lytra.
