= Irina Ilyenkova =

Belarusian rhythmic gymnast

Medal record
Rhythmic gymnastics
Representing Belarus
Olympic Games
Silver medal – second place	2000 Sydney	Group All-around

Irina Ilyenkova (born 10 April 1980) is a rhythmic gymnast from Belarus. She won a silver medal at the 2000 Summer Olympics. She was awarded with the Honored Master of Sports of the Republic of Belarus, and The Honored Coach of Belarus.
