= Anna Pollatou =

Greek rhythmic gymnast (1983–2014)

Personal information
- Born: 8 October 1983 Kefalonia, Greece
- Died: 17 May 2014 (aged 30) near Varda, Greece
Medal record
Rhythmic gymnastics
Representing Greece
Olympic Games
Bronze medal – third place	2000 Sydney	Group All-around
World Championships
Gold medal – first place	1999 Osaka	10 Clubs
Gold medal – first place	1999 Osaka	2 Hoops + 3 Ribbons
Silver medal – second place	1999 Osaka	All-Around
European Championships
Gold medal – first place	1999 Budapest	All-Around
Gold medal – first place	1999 Budapest	10 Clubs
Gold medal – first place	1999 Budapest	2 Hoops + 3 Ribbons

Anna Pollatou (Greek: Αννα Πολλάτου; 8 October 1983 in Kefalonia, Greece – 17 May 2014 [in a car-crash] near Varda, Ilia, Greece), was a Greek rhythmic gymnast. She won a bronze medal at the 2000 Summer Olympics. One year before, in 1999, Pollatou (at the age of 16) won 3 medals (a silver in the group all around and two golds in the event finals) at the World Championship in Osaka, Japan and 3 gold medals at the European Championship which took place in Budapest, Hungary.
