= Anna Glazkova =

Belarusian rhythmic gymnast (born 1981)

Personal information
- Born: July 29, 1981 (age 44) Salihorsk, Byelorussian SSR, Soviet Union

Sport
- Club: Dinamo Minsk
- Coached by: Irina Leparskaya
Medal record
Rhythmic gymnastics
Representing Belarus
Olympic Games
Silver medal – second place	2000 Sydney	Group All-around
World Championships
Gold medal – first place	1998 Seville	Group All-Around
Silver medal – second place	1998 Seville	3 Ribbons + 2 Hoops
Silver medal – second place	1998 Seville	5 Balls
Silver medal – second place	1999 Osaka	10 Clubs
Bronze medal – third place	1999 Osaka	Group All-Around
Bronze medal – third place	1999 Osaka	3 Ribbons + 2 Hoops
Junior European Championships
Silver medal – second place	1995 Prague	Team

Anna Glazkova (born July 29, 1981) is a Belarusian rhythmic gymnast. She won a silver medal at the 2000 Summer Olympics.
