= Irina Belova (rhythmic gymnast) =

Russian rhythmic gymnast (born 1980)

- Full name: Irina Olegovna Belova
- Born: December 28, 1980 (age 45) Zavolzhye, Nizhny Novgorod Oblast, Russian SFSR, Soviet Union
- Height: 175 cm (5 ft 9 in)

Gymnastics career
- Discipline: Rhythmic gymnastics
- Country represented: Russia
- Club: Dynamo
Medal record
Rhythmic gymnastics
Representing Russia
Olympic Games
Gold medal – first place	2000 Sydney	Group All-around

Irina Olegovna Belova (Russian: Ирина Олеговна Белова, born December 28, 1980, in Zavolzhye, Nizhny Novgorod Oblast) is a Russian rhythmic gymnast. She won a gold medal at the 2000 Summer Olympics.
