= Eirini Aindili =

Greek rhythmic gymnast (born 1983)

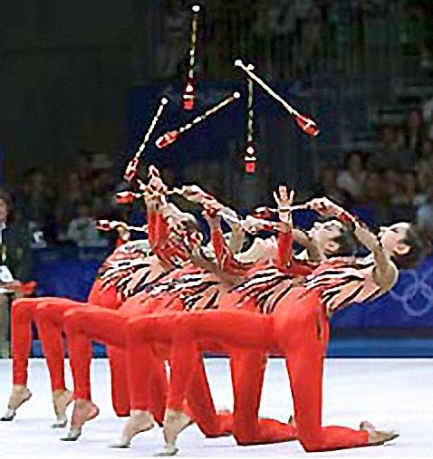
- Rhythmic gym group A

Personal information
- Born: 11 March 1983 (age 43) Euboia, Greece
- Height: 1.67 m (5 ft 6 in)

Gymnastics career
- Discipline: Rhythmic gymnastics
- Country represented: Greece
Medal record
Olympic Games
Bronze medal – third place	2000 Sydney	Group all-around

Eirini Aindili (Greek: Ειρήνη Αϊνδιλή; born 11 March 1983 in Euboia) is a Greek rhythmic gymnast. She won a bronze medal at the 2000 Summer Olympics.
