= Maria Georgatou =

Greek rhythmic gymnast

Personal information
- Born: 10 May 1984 (age 42) Athens, Greece
- Height: 165 cm (5 ft 5 in)
- Weight: 40 kg (88 lb)
Medal record
Rhythmic gymnastics
Representing Greece
Olympic Games
| Bronze medal – third place | 2000 Sydney | Group All-around |

Maria Georgatou (Greek: Μαρία Γεωργάτου; born 10 May 1984 in Athens) is a Greek rhythmic gymnast. She won a bronze medal at the 2000 Summer Olympics.

== Personal ==
Maria Georgatou is from Corfu.
