= Maria Lazuk =

Belarusian rhythmic gymnast (born 1983)

Mariya Lazuk
- Full name: Mariya Mikhaylovna Lazuk
- Born: October 15, 1983 (age 42) Minsk, Byelorussian SSR, Soviet Union

Gymnastics career
Medal record
Rhythmic gymnastics
Representing Belarus
Olympic Games
Silver medal – second place	2000 Sydney	Group All-around

Mariya Mikhaylovna Lazuk (born October 15, 1983) is a Belarus rhythmic gymnast. She won a silver medal at the 2000 Summer Olympics in the group all-around competition. She was born in Minsk, Belarus.
