= Tatyana Belan =

Belarusian rhythmic gymnast (born 1982)

- Full name: Tatyana Valeryevna Belan
- Born: November 10, 1982 (age 43) Minsk, Byelorussian SSR, Soviet Union

Gymnastics career
Medal record
Rhythmic gymnastics
Representing Belarus
Olympic Games
Silver medal – second place	2000 Sydney	Group All-around

Tatyana Valeryevna Belan (born November 10, 1982) is a Belarusian rhythmic gymnast. She won a silver medal at the 2000 Summer Olympics. She was born in Minsk, Belarus.
