= Olga Puzhevich =

Belarusian rhythmic gymnast

Medal record
Rhythmic gymnastics
Representing Belarus
Olympic Games
Silver medal – second place	2000 Sydney	Group All-around

Olga Puzhevich (born 17 May 1983) is a rhythmic gymnast from Belarus. She won a silver medal at the 2000 Summer Olympics in the group all-around competition.
