= Tatyana Ananko =

Belarusian rhythmic gymnast (born 1984)

- Full name: Tatyana Vasilyevna Ananko
- Born: June 26, 1984 (age 42) Minsk, Byelorussian SSR, Soviet Union

Gymnastics career
Medal record
Rhythmic gymnastics
Representing Belarus
Olympic Games
Silver medal – second place	2000 Sydney	Group All-around

Tatyana Vasilyevna Ananko (born June 26, 1984) is a Belarusian rhythmic gymnast. She won a silver medal at the 2000 Summer Olympics in the group all-around competition. Ananko was born in Minsk, Belarus.
