= List of gymnasts at the 2004 Summer Olympics =

This is a list of the gymnasts who represented their country at the 2004 Summer Olympics in Athens from 13 to 29 August 2004. Gymnasts across three disciplines (artistic gymnastics, rhythmic gymnastics, and trampoline) participated in the Games.

== Women's artistic gymnastics ==
	Name	Country	Date of birth (Age)
Youngest competitor	Maria Apostolidi	Greece	30 December 1988 (aged 15)
Oldest competitor	Oksana Chusovitina	Uzbekistan	19 June 1975 (aged 29)

NOC	Name	Date of birth (Age)	Hometown
Argentina	Celeste Carnevale	25 August 1985 (aged 18)	Buenos Aires, Argentina
Australia	Stephanie Moorhouse	20 January 1987 (aged 17)	Melbourne, Australia
Australia	Melissa Munro	8 February 1988 (aged 16)	Macksville, Australia
Australia	Karen Nguyen	24 November 1987 (aged 16)	Melbourne, Australia
Australia	Monette Russo	4 August 1988 (aged 16)	Lilydale, Australia
Australia	Lisa Skinner	17 February 1981 (aged 23)	Clear Mountain, Australia
Australia	Allana Slater	3 April 1984 (aged 20)	Mount Claremont, Australia
Belarus	Yulia Tarasenka	14 April 1985 (aged 19)	Minsk, Belarus
Belgium	Aagje Vanwalleghem	24 October 1987 (aged 16)	Poção de Pedras, Brazil
Bolivia	María José de la Fuente	2 December 1988 (aged 15)	Santiago, Chile
Brazil	Camila Comin	31 March 1983 (aged 21)	São Paulo, Brazil
Brazil	Daiane dos Santos	10 February 1983 (aged 21)	Porto Alegre, Brazil
Brazil	Daniele Hypólito	8 September 1984 (aged 19)	Santo André, Brazil
Brazil	Caroline Molinari	13 October 1986 (aged 17)	Curitiba, Brazil
Brazil	Ana Paula Rodrigues	20 January 1988 (aged 16)	Curitiba, Brazil
Brazil	Laís Souza	13 December 1988 (aged 15)	Ribeirão Preto, Brazil
Bulgaria	Evgeniya Kuznetsova	18 December 1980 (aged 23)	St. Petersburg, Russia
Canada	Melanie Banville	22 June 1987 (aged 17)	Cornwall, Ontario
Canada	Gael Mackie	16 December 1988 (aged 15)	Vancouver, British Columbia
Canada	Amelie Plante	22 September 1983 (aged 20)	Joliette, Quebec
Canada	Heather Purnell	5 November 1986 (aged 17)	Ottawa, Ontario
Canada	Kate Richardson	27 June 1984 (aged 20)	Coquitlam, British Columbia
Canada	Kylie Stone	16 May 1987 (aged 17)	Edmonton, Alberta
China	Cheng Fei	29 May 1988 (aged 16)	Huangshi, China
China	Fan Ye	23 October 1986 (aged 17)	Baoding, China
China	Li Ya	13 June 1988 (aged 16)	Bengbu, China
China	Lin Li	28 January 1986 (aged 18)	Guizhou, China
China	Wang Tiantian	14 February 1986 (aged 18)	Tianjin, China
China	Zhang Nan	30 April 1986 (aged 18)	Beijing, China
Cuba	Leyanet González	30 September 1978 (aged 25)	Sancti Spíritus, Cuba
Czech Republic	Jana Komrsková	6 May 1983 (aged 21)	Roudnice nad Labem, Czech Republic
France	Coralie Chacon	12 May 1985 (aged 19)	Nîmes, France
France	Soraya Chaouch	23 August 1988 (aged 15)	Dijon, France
France	Marine Debauve	3 September 1988 (aged 15)	Dijon, France
France	Émilie Le Pennec	31 December 1987 (aged 16)	La Garenne-Colombes, France
France	Camille Schmutz	30 September 1988 (aged 15)	Paris, France
France	Isabelle Severino	9 April 1980 (aged 24)	Paris, France
Germany	Lisa Brüggemann	29 December 1984 (aged 19)	Offenbach am Main, Germany
Germany	Yvonne Musik	21 December 1985 (aged 18)	Hamburg, Germany
Great Britain	Cherrelle Fennell	2 November 1986 (aged 17)	Manchester, England
Great Britain	Vanessa Hobbs	4 May 1987 (aged 17)	Portsmouth, England
Great Britain	Katy Lennon	16 October 1984 (aged 19)	Carshalton, England
Great Britain	Elizabeth Line	7 June 1985 (aged 19)	Woking, England
Great Britain	Beth Tweddle	1 April 1985 (aged 19)	Bunbury, England
Great Britain	Nicola Willis	13 March 1985 (aged 19)	Southend-on-Sea, England
Greece	Maria Apostolidi	30 December 1988 (aged 15)	Athens, Greece
Greece	Stefani Bismpikou	27 June 1988 (aged 16)	Athens, Greece
Hungary	Krisztina Szarka	25 June 1986 (aged 18)	Kerepestarcsa, Hungary
Italy	Monica Bergamelli	24 May 1984 (aged 20)	Alzano Lombardo, Italy
Italy	Maria Teresa Gargano	23 November 1986 (aged 17)	Rome, Italy
Japan	Manami Ishizaka	22 April 1986 (aged 18)	Tokyo, Japan
Japan	Kyoko Oshima	5 August 1986 (aged 18)	Tokyo, Japan
Mexico	Brenda Magaña	27 July 1977 (aged 27)	Guadalajara, Mexico
Mexico	Laura Moreno	16 November 1978 (aged 25)	Monterrey, Mexico
Netherlands	Suzanne Harmes	10 January 1986 (aged 18)	Zoetermeer, Netherlands
Netherlands	Laura van Leeuwen	22 April 1986 (aged 18)	The Hague, Netherlands
North Korea	Han Jong-ok	28 August 1986 (aged 17)	
North Korea	Hong Su-jong	9 March 1985 (aged 19)^{[Note 1]}	Hamhung, North Korea
North Korea	Kang Yun-mi	11 February 1988 (aged 16)	
North Korea	Kim Un-jong	13 August 1986 (aged 18)	
North Korea	Pyon Kwang-sun	18 November 1986 (aged 17)	Pyongyang, North Korea
North Korea	Ri Hae-yon	12 January 1988 (aged 16)	
Romania	Oana Ban	11 January 1986 (aged 18)	Cluj-Napoca, Romania
Romania	Alexandra Eremia	19 February 1987 (aged 17)	Bucharest, Romania
Romania	Cătălina Ponor	20 August 1987 (aged 16)	Constanța, Romania
Romania	Monica Roșu	11 May 1987 (aged 17)	Bacău, Romania
Romania	Daniela Șofronie	12 February 1988 (aged 16)	Constanța, Romania
Romania	Silvia Stroescu	8 May 1985 (aged 19)	Bucharest, Romania
Russia	Ludmila Ezhova	4 March 1982 (aged 22)	Moscow, Russia
Russia	Svetlana Khorkina	19 January 1979 (aged 25)	Belgorod, Russia
Russia	Maria Kryuchkova	7 July 1988 (aged 16)	Rostov-on-Don, Russia
Russia	Anna Pavlova	6 September 1987 (aged 16)	Orekhovo-Zuyevo, Russia
Russia	Elena Zamolodchikova	19 September 1982 (aged 21)	Moscow, Russia
Russia	Natalia Ziganshina	24 December 1985 (aged 18)	St. Petersburg, Russia
Slovakia	Zuzana Sekerová	25 September 1984 (aged 19)	Trnava, Slovakia
South Africa	Zandre Labuschagne	8 July 1986 (aged 18)	Klerksdorp, South Africa
South Korea	Park Kyung-ah	21 July 1986 (aged 18)	Gangwon, South Korea
Spain	Laura Campos	13 September 1988 (aged 15)	Mérida, Spain
Spain	Tania Gener	20 August 1988 (aged 15)	Vilassar de Mar, Spain
Spain	Elena Gómez	14 November 1985 (aged 18)	Manacor, Mallorca
Spain	Mónica Mesalles	2 October 1987 (aged 16)	Barcelona, Spain
Spain	Patricia Moreno	7 January 1988 (aged 16)	Madrid, Spain
Spain	Sara Moro	11 May 1984 (aged 20)	Guadalajara, Mexico
Sweden	Veronica Wagner	7 July 1987 (aged 17)	Stockholm, Sweden
Switzerland	Melanie Marti	3 June 1986 (aged 18)	Glarus, Switzerland
Ukraine	Mirabella Akhunu	7 June 1987 (aged 17)	Kyiv, Ukraine
Ukraine	Alina Kozich	16 December 1987 (aged 16)	Kyiv, Ukraine
Ukraine	Iryna Krasnianska	19 November 1987 (aged 16)	Vologda, Russia
Ukraine	Alona Kvasha	5 November 1984 (aged 19)	Cherkasy, Ukraine
Ukraine	Olga Sherbatykh	2 May 1988 (aged 16)	Rovenky, Ukraine
Ukraine	Iryna Yarotska	29 August 1985 (aged 18)	Kyiv, Ukraine
United States	Mohini Bhardwaj	29 September 1978 (aged 25)	Philadelphia, Pennsylvania
United States	Annia Hatch	14 June 1978 (aged 26)	Guantánamo, Cuba
United States	Terin Humphrey	14 August 1986 (aged 17)	St. Joseph, Missouri
United States	Courtney Kupets	27 July 1986 (aged 18)	Gaithersburg, Maryland
United States	Courtney McCool	1 April 1988 (aged 16)	Kansas City, Missouri
United States	Carly Patterson	4 February 1988 (aged 16)	Baton Rouge, Louisiana
Uzbekistan	Oksana Chusovitina	19 June 1975 (aged 29)	Bukhara, Uzbekistan

^{1} North Korea entered Hong Su-jong into the 2004 Olympics under a birth year of 1985. However, it entered her into other competitions under birth years of 1986 and 1989, and her true age has not been publicly established. If born in 1989, she would have been ineligible to compete in Athens under International Gymnastics Federation regulations, which require gymnasts to be at least 16 or to turn 16 within the same calendar year as the Olympics.

== Men's artistic gymnastics ==
	Name	Country	Date of birth (Age)
Youngest competitor	Fabian Hambüchen	Germany	25 October 1987 (aged 16)
Oldest competitor	Jury Chechi	Italy	11 October 1969 (aged 34)

NOC	Name	Date of birth (Age)	Hometown
Australia	Philippe Rizzo	9 February 1981 (aged 23)	Sydney, Australia
Belarus	Ivan Ivankov	10 April 1975 (aged 29)	Minsk, Belarus
Belarus	Denis Savenkov	17 September 1983 (aged 20)	Gomel, Belarus
Brazil	Mosiah Rodrigues	30 August 1981 (aged 22)	Porto Alegre, Brazil
Bulgaria	Filip Yanev	10 March 1982 (aged 22)	Sofia, Bulgaria
Bulgaria	Yordan Yovchev	24 February 1973 (aged 31)	Plovdiv, Bulgaria
Canada	Grant Golding	30 March 1981 (aged 23)	Maple Ridge, British Columbia
Canada	Ken Ikeda	24 February 1982 (aged 22)	Kamloops, British Columbia
Canada	Alexander Jeltkov	25 February 1978 (aged 26)	Tbilisi, Georgia
Canada	David Kikuchi	27 December 1979 (aged 24)	Truro, Nova Scotia
Canada	Kyle Shewfelt	6 May 1982 (aged 22)	Calgary, Alberta
Canada	Adam Wong	29 March 1985 (aged 19)	Calgary, Alberta
China	Huang Xu	4 February 1979 (aged 25)	Nantong, China
China	Li Xiaopeng	27 July 1981 (aged 23)	Changsha, China
China	Teng Haibin	2 January 1985 (aged 19)	Beijing, China
China	Xiao Qin	1 January 1985 (aged 19)	Nanjing, China
China	Xing Aowei	15 February 1982 (aged 22)	Yantai, China
China	Yang Wei	8 February 1980 (aged 24)	Xiantao, China
Colombia	Jorge Hugo Giraldo	5 September 1979 (aged 24)	Medellín, Colombia
Cuba	Abel Driggs Santos	12 December 1975 (aged 28)	
Cuba	Erick López	29 December 1972 (aged 31)	Havana, Cuba
France	Pierre-Yves Bény	12 February 1983 (aged 21)	Lille, France
France	Benoît Caranobe	12 June 1980 (aged 24)	Vitry-sur-Seine, France
France	Yann Cucherat	2 October 1979 (aged 24)	Lyon, France
France	Dimitri Karbanenko	19 July 1973 (aged 31)	Kaliningrad, Russia
France	Florent Marée	17 November 1980 (aged 23)	Saint-Louis, Réunion
France	Johan Mounard	14 June 1979 (aged 25)	Lyon, France
Georgia	Ilia Giorgadze	12 January 1978 (aged 26)	Kutaisi, Georgia
Germany	Thomas Andergassen	20 February 1980 (aged 24)	Lindau, Germany
Germany	Matthias Fahrig	15 December 1985 (aged 18)	Wittenberg, Germany
Germany	Fabian Hambüchen	25 October 1987 (aged 16)	Bergisch Gladbach, Germany
Germany	Robert Juckel	12 December 1981 (aged 22)	Cottbus, Germany
Germany	Sven Kwiatkowski	14 April 1977 (aged 27)	Freiberg, Germany
Germany	Sergej Pfeifer	20 February 1977 (aged 27)	Dushanbe, Tajikistan
Greece	Vlasios Maras	31 March 1983 (aged 21)	Athens, Greece
Greece	Dimosthenis Tampakos	12 November 1976 (aged 27)	Thessaloniki, Greece
Hungary	Róbert Gál	30 March 1979 (aged 25)	Budapest, Hungary
Iceland	Rúnar Alexandersson	28 March 1977 (aged 27)	Smolensk, Russia
Israel	Pavel Gofman	26 November 1979 (aged 24)	Luhansk, Ukraine
Italy	Matteo Angioletti	8 November 1980 (aged 23)	Monza, Italy
Italy	Alberto Busnari	4 October 1978 (aged 25)	Melzo, Italy
Italy	Igor Cassina	15 August 1977 (aged 26)	Seregno, Italy
Italy	Jury Chechi	11 October 1969 (aged 34)	Prato, Italy
Italy	Matteo Morandi	8 October 1981 (aged 22)	Vimercate, Italy
Italy	Enrico Pozzo	12 February 1981 (aged 23)	Biella, Italy
Japan	Takehiro Kashima	16 July 1980 (aged 24)	Osaka, Japan
Japan	Hisashi Mizutori	22 July 1980 (aged 24)	Shizuoka, Japan
Japan	Daisuke Nakano	10 October 1982 (aged 21)	Niigata, Japan
Japan	Hiroyuki Tomita	21 October 1980 (aged 23)	Osaka, Japan
Japan	Naoya Tsukahara	25 June 1977 (aged 27)	Nagasaki, Japan
Japan	Isao Yoneda	20 August 1977 (aged 26)	Tokyo, Japan
Kazakhstan	Yernar Yerimbetov	15 February 1980 (aged 24)	Almaty, Kazakhstan
Latvia	Jevgēņijs Saproņenko	11 November 1978 (aged 25)	Riga, Latvia
Latvia	Igors Vihrovs	6 June 1978 (aged 26)	Riga, Latvia
Malaysia	Ng Shu Wai	27 May 1985 (aged 19)	Taiping, Malaysia
North Korea	Kim Hyon-il	28 December 1976 (aged 27)	Sosong, North Korea
North Korea	Ri Jong-song	27 January 1982 (aged 22)	
Portugal	Filipe Bezugo	10 November 1980 (aged 23)	Funchal, Portugal
Puerto Rico	Luis Vargas	8 July 1983 (aged 21)	Río Piedras, Puerto Rico
Romania	Marian Drăgulescu	18 December 1980 (aged 23)	Bucharest, Romania
Romania	Ilie Daniel Popescu	1 June 1983 (aged 21)	Reșița, Romania
Romania	Dan Potra	28 July 1978 (aged 26)	Timișoara, Romania
Romania	Răzvan Șelariu	2 November 1983 (aged 20)	Reșița, Romania
Romania	Ioan Silviu Suciu	24 November 1977 (aged 26)	Sibiu, Romania
Romania	Marius Urzică	30 September 1975 (aged 28)	Toplița, Romania
Russia	Aleksei Bondarenko	23 August 1978 (aged 25)	Kostanay, Kazakhstan
Russia	Maksim Devyatovskiy	22 April 1984 (aged 20)	Leninsk-Kuznetsky, Russia
Russia	Anton Golotsutskov	28 July 1985 (aged 19)	Seversk, Russia
Russia	Georgy Grebenkov	8 January 1982 (aged 22)	St. Petersburg, Russia
Russia	Aleksei Nemov	28 May 1976 (aged 28)	Barashevo, Russia
Russia	Aleksandr Safoshkin	13 March 1976 (aged 28)	Rostov-on-Don, Russia
South Korea	Jo Seong-min	5 January 1976 (aged 28)	Jeollabuk, South Korea
South Korea	Kim Dae-eun	17 September 1984 (aged 19)	Seoul, South Korea
South Korea	Kim Dong-hwa	21 March 1976 (aged 28)	
South Korea	Kim Seung-il	9 May 1985 (aged 19)	Gwangju, South Korea
South Korea	Lee Seon-seong	26 December 1980 (aged 23)	Gyeonggi, South Korea
South Korea	Yang Tae-young	8 July 1980 (aged 24)	Seoul, South Korea
Spain	Alejandro Barrenechea	30 March 1976 (aged 28)	Bilbao, Spain
Spain	Víctor Cano	10 February 1978 (aged 26)	Barcelona, Spain
Spain	Jesús Carballo	26 November 1976 (aged 27)	Madrid, Spain
Spain	Oriol Combarros	12 May 1980 (aged 24)	Barcelona, Spain
Spain	Gervasio Deferr	7 November 1980 (aged 23)	Barcelona, Spain
Spain	Rafael Martínez	10 December 1983 (aged 20)	Móstoles, Spain
Switzerland	Christoph Schärer	14 August 1980 (aged 23)	Oberdiessbach, Switzerland
Switzerland	Andreas Schweizer	26 September 1979 (aged 24)	Wetzikon, Switzerland
Tunisia	Wajdi Bouallègue	9 February 1982 (aged 22)	Tunis, Tunisia
Ukraine	Yevhen Bohonosyuk	18 January 1982 (aged 22)	Kyiv, Ukraine
Ukraine	Valeriy Honcharov	19 September 1977 (aged 26)	Kharkiv, Ukraine
Ukraine	Vadym Kuvakin	4 May 1984 (aged 20)	Kherson, Ukraine
Ukraine	Ruslan Mezentsev	24 June 1981 (aged 23)	Kropyvnytskyi, Ukraine
Ukraine	Andriy Mykhailychenko	11 August 1981 (aged 23)	St. Petersburg, Russia
Ukraine	Roman Zozulya	22 June 1979 (aged 25)	Zaporizhzhia, Ukraine
United States	Jason Gatson	25 June 1980 (aged 24)	Mesa, Arizona
United States	Morgan Hamm	24 September 1982 (aged 21)	Ashland, Wisconsin
United States	Paul Hamm	24 September 1982 (aged 21)	Ashland, Wisconsin
United States	Brett McClure	19 February 1981 (aged 23)	Yakima, Washington
United States	Blaine Wilson	3 August 1974 (aged 30)	Columbus, Ohio
United States	Guard Young	3 June 1977 (aged 27)	State College, Pennsylvania

== Rhythmic gymnasts ==
=== Individual ===
	Name	Country	Date of birth (Age)
Youngest competitor	Lisa Ingildeeva	Germany	4 December 1988 (aged 15)
Oldest competitor	Almudena Cid	Spain	15 June 1980 (aged 24)

NOC	Name	Date of birth (age)	Hometown
Australia	Penelope Blackmore	23 April 1984 (aged 20)	Melbourne, Australia
Azerbaijan	Anna Gurbanova	24 September 1986 (aged 17)	Moscow, Russia
Belarus	Svetlana Rudalova	3 November 1984 (aged 19)	Kremenchuk, Ukraine
Belarus	Inna Zhukova	6 September 1986 (aged 17)	Krasnodar, Russia
Bulgaria	Elizabeth Paisieva	17 December 1986 (aged 17)	Sofia, Bulgaria
Bulgaria	Simona Peycheva	14 May 1985 (aged 19)	Sofia, Bulgaria
Cape Verde	Wania Monteiro	9 August 1986 (aged 18)	Santa Catarina, Cape Verde
China	Zhong Ling	30 October 1983 (aged 20)	Liuzhou, China
Czech Republic	Dominika Červenková	18 May 1988 (aged 16)	České Budějovice, Czech Republic
Germany	Lisa Ingildeeva	4 December 1988 (aged 15)	Moscow, Russia
Great Britain	Hannah McKibbin	7 May 1985 (aged 19)	London, England
Greece	Eleni Andriola	9 November 1986 (aged 17)	Athens, Greece
Greece	Theodora Pallidou	14 September 1988 (aged 15)	Thessaloniki, Greece
Israel	Katerina Pisetsky	26 February 1986 (aged 18)	Zaporizhzhia, Ukraine
Italy	Laura Zacchilli	2 October 1980 (aged 23)	Fano, Italy
Japan	Yukari Murata	9 October 1981 (aged 22)	Hyogo, Japan
Kazakhstan	Aliya Yussupova	15 May 1984 (aged 20)	Shymkent, Kazakhstan
Russia	Alina Kabaeva	12 May 1983 (aged 21)	Tashkent, Uzbekistan
Russia	Irina Tchachina	24 April 1982 (aged 22)	Omsk, Russia
South Africa	Stephanie Sandler	9 October 1987 (aged 16)	Cape Town, South Africa
Spain	Almudena Cid	15 June 1980 (aged 24)	Vitoria-Gasteiz, Spain
Ukraine	Anna Bessonova	29 July 1984 (aged 20)	Kyiv, Ukraine
Ukraine	Natalia Godunko	5 December 1984 (aged 19)	Kyiv, Ukraine
United States	Mary Sanders	26 August 1985 (aged 18)	Toronto, Ontario

=== Group ===
	Name	Country	Date of birth (Age)
Youngest competitor	Ilektra Efthymiou	Greece	24 June 1989 (aged 15)
Oldest competitor	Dayane Camilo	Brazil	15 December 1977 (aged 26)

NOC	Name	Date of birth (Age)	Hometown
Belarus	Nataliya Aleksandrova	8 August 1984 (aged 20)	Minsk, Belarus
Belarus	Yenia Burlo	29 May 1988 (aged 16)	Minsk, Belarus
Belarus	Glafira Martinovich	4 February 1989 (aged 15)	Minsk, Belarus
Belarus	Zlatislava Nersesyan	31 July 1984 (aged 20)	Krasnodar, Russia
Belarus	Galina Nikandrova	9 September 1987 (aged 16)	Navapolatsk, Belarus
Belarus	Mariya Poplyko	15 January 1986 (aged 18)	Babruysk, Belarus
Brazil	Larissa Barata	31 March 1987 (aged 17)	Salvador, Brazil
Brazil	Dayane Camilo	15 December 1977 (aged 26)	Londrina, Brazil
Brazil	Fernanda Cavalieri	28 August 1985 (aged 18)	São Paulo, Brazil
Brazil	Ana Maria Maciel	18 November 1987 (aged 16)	Londrina, Brazil
Brazil	Tayanne Mantovaneli	14 February 1987 (aged 17)	São Paulo, Brazil
Brazil	Jennifer Oliveira	16 March 1989 (aged 15)	Londrina, Brazil
Bulgaria	Zhaneta Ilieva	3 October 1984 (aged 19)	Veliko Tarnovo, Bulgaria
Bulgaria	Eleonora Kezhova	28 December 1985 (aged 18)	Sofia, Bulgaria
Bulgaria	Zornitsa Marinova	6 January 1987 (aged 17)	Veliko Tarnovo, Bulgaria
Bulgaria	Kristina Rangelova	24 January 1985 (aged 19)	Sofia, Bulgaria
Bulgaria	Galina Tancheva	18 May 1987 (aged 17)	Varna, Bulgaria
Bulgaria	Vladislava Tancheva	18 May 1987 (aged 17)	Varna, Bulgaria
China	Dai Yongjun	10 December 1984 (aged 19)	Liaoning, China
China	Hu Mei	9 April 1987 (aged 17)	Nanning, China
China	Li Jia	14 April 1983 (aged 21)	Liaoning, China
China	Lu Yingna	14 August 1984 (aged 19)	Yanjiang, China
China	Lü Yuanyang	22 June 1983 (aged 21)	Sichuan, China
China	Zhang Shuo	5 January 1984 (aged 20)	Shenyang, China
Greece	Ilektra Efthymiou	24 June 1989 (aged 15)	
Greece	Maria Kakiou	29 January 1989 (aged 15)	Marousi, Greece
Greece	Liana Khristidou	5 January 1987 (aged 17)	Athens, Greece
Greece	Eleni Khronopoulou	19 November 1988 (aged 15)	Marousi, Greece
Greece	Varvara Magnisali	10 July 1986 (aged 18)	Athens, Greece
Greece	Steriana Pantazi	27 October 1987 (aged 16)	Marousi, Greece
Italy	Elisa Blanchi	13 October 1987 (aged 16)	Velletri, Italy
Italy	Fabrizia D'Ottavio	3 February 1985 (aged 19)	Chieti, Italy
Italy	Marinella Falca	1 May 1986 (aged 18)	Terlizzi, Italy
Italy	Daniela Masseroni	28 February 1985 (aged 19)	Trescore Balneario, Italy
Italy	Elisa Santoni	10 December 1987 (aged 16)	Rome, Italy
Italy	Laura Vernizzi	12 September 1985 (aged 18)	Como, Italy
Poland	Justyna Banasiak	2 May 1986 (aged 18)	Szczecin, Poland
Poland	Martyna Dąbkowska	25 May 1989 (aged 15)	Gdynia, Poland
Poland	Małgorzata Ławrynowicz	15 December 1988 (aged 15)	Wejherowo, Poland
Poland	Anna Mrozińska	25 November 1985 (aged 18)	Gdynia, Poland
Poland	Aleksandra Wójcik	5 March 1985 (aged 19)	Lębork, Poland
Poland	Aleksandra Zawistowska	19 November 1983 (aged 20)	Gdynia, Poland
Russia	Olesya Belugina	2 January 1984 (aged 20)	Penza, Russia
Russia	Olga Glatskikh	13 February 1989 (aged 15)	Lesnoy, Russia
Russia	Tatiana Kurbakova	7 August 1986 (aged 18)	Moscow, Russia
Russia	Natalia Lavrova	4 August 1984 (aged 20)	Penza, Russia
Russia	Elena Murzina	15 June 1984 (aged 20)	Yekaterinburg, Russia
Russia	Elena Posevina	13 February 1986 (aged 18)	Tula, Russia
Spain	Sonia Abejón	1 August 1985 (aged 19)	Madrid, Spain
Spain	Bárbara González	15 January 1985 (aged 19)	Pamplona, Spain
Spain	Marta Linares	31 January 1986 (aged 18)	Castellón de la Plana, Spain
Spain	Isabel Pagán	24 July 1986 (aged 18)	Orihuela, Spain
Spain	Carolina Rodríguez	24 May 1986 (aged 18)	León, Spain
Spain	Nuria Velasco	2 March 1985 (aged 19)	Lérida, Spain
Ukraine	Maria Bila	4 January 1987 (aged 17)	Kharkiv, Ukraine
Ukraine	Yulia Chernova	2 March 1986 (aged 18)	Mykolaïv, Ukraine
Ukraine	Olena Dzyubchuk	19 May 1985 (aged 19)	Simferopol, Ukraine
Ukraine	Yelyzaveta Karabash	21 June 1985 (aged 19)	Dnipro, Ukraine
Ukraine	Inga Kozhokhina	26 January 1987 (aged 17)	Kharkiv, Ukraine
Ukraine	Oksana Paslas	6 February 1986 (aged 18)	Lviv, Ukraine

== Male trampoline gymnasts ==
	Name	Country	Date of birth (Age)
Youngest competitor	Ludovic Martin	Switzerland	25 October 1983 (aged 20)
Oldest competitor	Alexander Moskalenko	Russia	4 November 1969 (aged 34)

NOC	Name	Date of birth (Age)	Hometown
Belarus	Mikalai Kazak	8 September 1977 (aged 26)	Vitebsk, Belarus
Belarus	Dmitri Poliaroush	20 September 1970 (aged 33)	Berezniki, Russia
Canada	Mathieu Turgeon	2 August 1979 (aged 25)	Pointe-Claire, Quebec
China	Mu Yongfeng	19 September 1983 (aged 20)	Shanxi, China
Denmark	Peter Jensen	5 March 1980 (aged 24)	Copenhagen, Denmark
France	David Martin	8 June 1977 (aged 27)	Thiais, France
Germany	Henrik Stehlik	29 December 1980 (aged 23)	Salzgitter, Germany
Great Britain	Gary Smith	22 September 1980 (aged 23)	Chatham, England
Greece	Michail Pelivanidis	9 October 1972 (aged 31)	
Italy	Flavio Cannone	5 November 1981 (aged 22)	Ponte San Pietro, Italy
Netherlands	Alan Villafuerte	29 June 1977 (aged 27)	San Salvador, El Salvador
Portugal	Nuno Merino	2 July 1980 (aged 24)	Lisbon, Portugal
Russia	Alexander Moskalenko	4 November 1969 (aged 34)	Pereyaslovskaya, Russia
Russia	Alexander Rusakov	31 December 1980 (aged 23)	Yeysk, Russia
Switzerland	Ludovic Martin	25 October 1983 (aged 20)	Detroit, Michigan
Ukraine	Yuriy Nikitin	15 July 1978 (aged 26)	Kherson, Ukraine

== Female trampoline gymnasts ==
	Name	Country	Date of birth (Age)
Youngest competitor	Huang Shanshan	China	18 January 1986 (aged 18)
Oldest competitor	Lesley Daly	Australia	28 June 1966 (aged 38)

NOC	Name	Date of birth (Age)	Hometown
Australia	Lesley Daly	28 June 1966 (aged 38)	Bedford, England
Belarus	Tatsiana Piatrenia	18 October 1981 (aged 22)	Mogilev, Belarus
Canada	Karen Cockburn	2 October 1980 (aged 23)	Toronto, Ontario
Canada	Heather Ross-McManus	3 September 1973 (aged 30)	Etobicoke, Ontario
China	Huang Shanshan	18 January 1986 (aged 18)	Fuzhou, China
Georgia	Rusudan Khoperia	9 September 1972 (aged 31)	Tbilisi, Georgia
Germany	Anna Dogonadze	15 February 1973 (aged 31)	Mtskheta, Georgia
Great Britain	Kirsten Lawton	17 November 1980 (aged 23)	Hemel Hempstead, England
Japan	Haruka Hirota	11 April 1984 (aged 20)	Minoh, Japan
Netherlands	Andrea Lenders	29 December 1980 (aged 23)	Groningen, Netherlands
Russia	Natalia Chernova	6 March 1976 (aged 28)	Krasnodar, Russia
Russia	Irina Karavayeva	18 May 1975 (aged 29)	Krasnodar, Russia
Slovakia	Katka Prokešová	1 February 1976 (aged 28)	Bratislava, Slovakia
Ukraine	Olena Movchan	17 August 1976 (aged 27)	Mykolaiv, Ukraine
United States	Jennifer Parilla	9 January 1981 (aged 23)	Newport Beach, California
Uzbekistan	Ekaterina Khilko	25 March 1982 (aged 22)	Tashkent, Uzbekistan
