= Gymnastics at the 2004 Summer Olympics – Women's rhythmic group all-around =

Women's rhythmic group all-around at the Games of the XXVIII Olympiad
- Venue: Galatsi Olympic Hall

Medalists
1st place, gold medalist(s)		Olesia Beluguina; Olga Glatskikh; Tatiana Kurbakova; Natalia Lavrova; Elena Murzina; Yelena Posevina	Russia
2nd place, silver medalist(s)		Elisa Blanchi; Fabrizia D'Ottavio; Marinella Falca; Daniela Masseroni; Elisa Santoni; Laura Vernizzi	Italy
3rd place, bronze medalist(s)		Zhaneta Ilieva; Eleonora Kezhova; Zornitsa Marinova; Kristina Ranguelova; Galina Tancheva; Vladislava Tancheva	Bulgaria

These are the results of the rhythmic group all-around competition, one of the two events of the rhythmic gymnastics discipline contested in the gymnastics at the 2004 Summer Olympics in Athens. The qualification and final rounds took place on August 26 and August 28 at the Galatsi Olympic Hall.

== Results ==
Ten national teams, each composed by six gymnasts, competed in the group all-around event in the rhythmic gymnastics qualification round on August 26. The eight highest scoring teams advanced to the final on August 28.

=== Qualification ===
Rank	Team	5				3 + 2				Total	
Rank	Team	Technical Value	Artistic Value	Execution	Score	Technical Value	Artistic Value	Execution	Score	Total	
1	Russia; Olesia Beluguina; Olga Glatskikh; Tatiana Kurbakova; Natalia Lavrova; Elena Murzina; Yelena Posevina	8.200	9.100	7.500	24.700	8.000	9.100	8.075	25.175	49.875	Q
2	Italy; Elisa Blanchi; Fabrizia D'Ottavio; Marinella Falca; Daniela Masseroni; Elisa Santoni; Laura Vernizzi	7.300	8.400	7.250	22.850	7.900	9.200	8.225	25.325	48.175	Q
3	Bulgaria; Zhaneta Ilieva; Eleonora Kezhova; Zornitsa Marinova; Kristina Ranguelova; Galina Tancheva; Vladislava Tancheva	7.600	7.500	7.200	22.300	7.800	9.000	7.800	24.600	46.900	Q
4	Greece; Liana Khristidou; Eleni Khronopoulou; Ilektra-Elli Efthymiou; Maria Kakiou; Varvara Magnisali; Steriani Pantazi	7.700	8.300	6.800	22.700	7.400	8.800	7.500	23.700	46.400	Q
5	China; Dai Yongjun; Hu Mei; Li Jia; Lu Yingna; Lü Yuanyang; Zhang Shuo	7.400	8.200	7.000	22.300	7.200	8.600	8.000	23.800	46.100	Q
6	Belarus; Nataliya Aleksandrova; Yenia Burlo; Glafira Martinovich; Zlatislava Nersesyan; Galina Nikandrova; Maryia Poplyko	7.400	8.600	7.200	23.200	7.200	8.400	6.900	22.500	45.700	Q
7	Brazil; Larissa Barata; Fernanda Cavalieri; Ana Maria Maciel; Tayanne Mantovaneli; Jeniffer Oliveira; Dayane Camilo	7.000	8.200	6.250	21.450	7.000	8.800	7.700	23.500	44.950	Q
8	Spain; Sonia Abejón; Bárbara González; Marta Linares; Isabel Pagán; Carolina Rodríguez; Nuria Velasco	7.000	7.400	6.800	21.200	7.100	8.400	7.900	23.400	44.600	Q
9	Ukraine; Maria Bila; Yulia Chernova; Olena Dzybchuk; Yelyzaveta Karabash; Inga Kozhokhina; Oksana Paslas	6.300	7.300	5.750	19.350	7.100	8.900	6.800	22.800	42.150	
10	Poland; Justyna Banasiak; Martyna Dąbkowska; Małgorzata Ławrynowicz; Anna Mrozińska; Alexandra Wójcik; Aleksandra Zawistowska	6.300	7.900	6.625	20.725	6.200	8.100	6.950	21.050	41.775	

=== Final ===
Rank	Team	5				3 + 2				Total
Rank	Team	Technical Value	Artistic Value	Execution	Score	Technical Value	Artistic Value	Execution	Score	Total
Gold medal	Russia	8.100	9.200	8.000	25.300	8.200	9.300	8.300	25.800	51.100
Silver medal	Italy	7.600	8.650	7.900	24.150	7.700	9.300	8.300	25.300	49.450
Bronze medal	Bulgaria	7.600	8.700	7.100	23.400	7.700	9.300	8.200	25.200	48.600
4	Belarus	7.400	8.900	7.300	23.500	7.700	8.800	8.000	24.500	48.000
5	Greece	7.600	8.400	6.600	22.600	7.700	8.400	7.825	23.925	46.525
6	China	7.400	8.400	7.500	23.100	7.200	8.400	7.800	23.400	46.500
7	Spain	7.000	8.400	7.000	22.400	6.800	8.500	7.700	22.950	45.350
8	Brazil	7.200	8.400	6.400	21.900	7.000	8.700	7.000	22.500	44.400
