= Gymnastics at the 2004 Summer Olympics =

Gymnastics at the Games of the XXVIII Olympiad
- Pictograms for artistic (left), rhythmic (center), and trampoline (right)
- Venue: Olympic Indoor Hall (artistic and trampoline); Galatsi Olympic Hall (rhythmic)
- Dates: 14 – 29 August 2004
- Competitors: 252 from 45 nations

At the 2004 Summer Olympics in Athens, Greece, three disciplines of gymnastics were contested: artistic gymnastics (August 14–23), rhythmic gymnastics (August 26–29) and trampoline (August 20–21). The artistic gymnastics and trampoline events were held at the Olympic Indoor Hall and the rhythmic gymnastics events were held at the Galatsi Olympic Hall.

== Artistic gymnastics ==
=== Format of competition ===
The competition format was largely the same as at the 2000 Summer Olympics. All participating gymnasts, including those who were not part of a team, participated in a qualification round. The results of this competition determined which teams and individuals participated in the remaining competitions, which included:

- The team competition, in which the eight highest scoring teams from qualifications competed. For the first time, each team of six gymnasts could only have three gymnasts perform on each apparatus, and all three scores counted toward the team total.
- The all-around competition, in which only the twenty-four highest scoring individuals in the all-around competed. For the first time, each country was limited to only two gymnasts in the all-around final.
- The event finals, in which the eight highest scoring individuals on each apparatus competed. Each country was limited to two gymnasts in each apparatus final.

=== Medalists - Men's Events ===
Games	Gold	Silver	Bronze
Team all-around	Japan; Takehiro Kashima; Hisashi Mizutori; Daisuke Nakano; Hiroyuki Tomita; Naoya Tsukahara; Isao Yoneda	United States; Jason Gatson; Morgan Hamm; Paul Hamm; Brett McClure; Blaine Wilson; Guard Young	Romania; Marian Drăgulescu; Ilie Daniel Popescu; Dan Nicolae Potra; Răzvan Dorin Şelariu; Ioan Silviu Suciu; Marius Urzică
Individual all-around	Paul Hamm; United States	Kim Dae-eun; South Korea	Yang Tae-young; South Korea
Floor Exercise	Kyle Shewfelt; Canada	Marian Drăgulescu; Romania	Yordan Yovchev; Bulgaria
Pommel horse	Teng Haibin; China	Marius Urzică; Romania	Takehiro Kashima; Japan
Rings	Dimosthenis Tampakos; Greece	Yordan Yovchev; Bulgaria	Jury Chechi; Italy
Vault	Gervasio Deferr; Spain	Jevgēņijs Saproņenko; Latvia	Marian Drăgulescu; Romania
Parallel bars	Valeri Goncharov; Ukraine	Hiroyuki Tomita; Japan	Li Xiaopeng; China
Horizontal bar	Igor Cassina; Italy	Paul Hamm; United States	Isao Yoneda; Japan

=== Medalists - Women's Events ===
Games	Gold	Silver	Bronze
Team all-around	Romania; Oana Ban; Alexandra Eremia; Cătălina Ponor; Monica Roșu; Nicoleta Daniela Șofronie; Silvia Stroescu	United States; Mohini Bhardwaj; Annia Hatch; Terin Humphrey; Courtney Kupets; Courtney McCool; Carly Patterson	Russia; Ludmila Ezhova; Svetlana Khorkina; Maria Krioutchkova; Anna Pavlova; Elena Zamolodchikova; Natalia Ziganshina
Individual all-around	Carly Patterson; United States	Svetlana Khorkina; Russia	Zhang Nan; China
Vault	Monica Roșu; Romania	Annia Hatch; United States	Anna Pavlova; Russia
Uneven bars	Émilie Le Pennec; France	Terin Humphrey; United States	Courtney Kupets; United States
Balance beam	Cătălina Ponor; Romania	Carly Patterson; United States	Alexandra Eremia; Romania
Floor exercises	Cătălina Ponor; Romania	Nicoleta Daniela Șofronie; Romania	Patricia Moreno; Spain

== Rhythmic gymnastics ==
Games	Gold	Silver	Bronze
Individual all-around	Alina Kabaeva; Russia	Irina Tchachina; Russia	Anna Bessonova; Ukraine
Group all-around	Russia; Olesya Belugina; Olga Glatskikh; Tatiana Kurbakova; Natalia Lavrova; Yelena Posevina; Elena Murzina	Italy; Elisa Blanchi; Fabrizia D'Ottavio; Marinella Falca; Daniela Masseroni; Elisa Santoni; Laura Vernizzi	Bulgaria; Zhaneta Ilieva; Eleonora Kezhova; Zornitsa Marinova; Kristina Rangelova; Galina Tancheva; Vladislava Tancheva

== Trampoline ==
Games	Gold	Silver	Bronze
Men's individual	Yuri Nikitin; Ukraine	Alexander Moskalenko; Russia	Henrik Stehlik; Germany
Women's individual	Anna Dogonadze; Germany	Karen Cockburn; Canada	Huang Shanshan; China

== Medal table ==
Rank	Nation	Gold	Silver	Bronze	Total
1	Romania	4	3	3	10
2	United States	2	6	1	9
3	Russia	2	3	2	7
4	Ukraine	2	0	1	3
5	Japan	1	1	2	4
6	Italy	1	1	1	3
7	Canada	1	1	0	2
8	China	1	0	3	4
9	Germany	1	0	1	2
9	Spain	1	0	1	2
11	France	1	0	0	1
11	Greece	1	0	0	1
13	Bulgaria	0	1	2	3
14	South Korea	0	1	1	2
15	Latvia	0	1	0	1
Totals (15 entries)		18	18	18	54

== Participating nations ==
A total of 252 gymnasts from 45 nations competed at the Athens Games.

- Argentina (1)
- Australia (9)
- Azerbaijan (1)
- Belarus (8)
- Belgium (1)
- Bolivia (1)
- Brazil (7)
- Bulgaria (5)
- Canada (15)
- Cape Verde (1)
- China (15)
- Colombia (1)
- Cuba (3)
- Czech Republic (2)
- Denmark (1)
- France (13)
- Georgia (2)
- Germany (11)
- Great Britain (9)
- Greece (7)
- Hungary (2)
- Iceland (1)
- Israel (2)
- Italy (10)
- Japan (10)
- Kazakhstan (2)
- Latvia (2)
- Malaysia (1)
- Mexico (2)
- Netherlands (4)
- North Korea (8)
- Portugal (2)
- Puerto Rico (1)
- Romania (12)
- Russia (18)
- Slovakia (2)
- South Africa (2)
- South Korea (7)
- Spain (13)
- Sweden (1)
- Switzerland (4)
- Tunisia (1)
- Ukraine (16)
- United States (14)
- Uzbekistan (2)

== Controversies ==
The gymnastics competition had scoring controversies, most prominently with the South Korean competitor Yang Tae-young.

The Korean team contested Tae-Young's parallel bars score after judges misidentified one of the elements of his routine. The effect of this misidentification was that the start value was recorded as 9.9 rather than 10. The Court of Arbitration for Sport (CAS) dismissed the Korean Olympic Committee's appeal on the grounds that the appeal, coming after the end of competition, was made too late, and insufficient evidence of corruption or bad faith on the part of the judges was presented to overturn a strong preference for a "field of play" judgment rather than one made after the fact.

Further problems occurred in the men's horizontal bar competition. After performing a routine with six release skills in the high bar event final (including four in a row – three variations of Tkatchev releases and a Gienger), the judges posted a score of 9.725, placing Nemov in third position with several athletes still to compete. This was actually a fair judging decision because he took a big step on landing which was a two tenths deduction. The crowd became unruly on seeing the results and interrupted the competition for almost fifteen minutes. Influenced by the crowd's fierce reaction, the judges reevaluated the routine and increased Nemov's score to 9.762, but this did not improve his placement and he finished without a medal.

The controversies led to the reconstruction of the scoring system which was implemented in 2006. The rule changes are credited as having encouraged more acrobatic activity and increasing difficulties on the high bar apparatus seen in later competitions.

== See also ==
- Gymnastics at the 2002 Asian Games
- Gymnastics at the 2002 Commonwealth Games
- Gymnastics at the 2003 African Games
- Gymnastics at the 2003 Pan American Games
- 2003 World Artistic Gymnastics Championships
