= Bulgaria at the 2004 Summer Olympics =

- IOC code: BUL
- NOC: Bulgarian Olympic Committee
- Website: www.bgolympic.org (in Bulgarian and English)

in Athens
- Competitors: 95 in 19 sports
- Flag bearer: Mariya Grozdeva
- Medals Ranked 33rd: Gold 2 Silver 1 Bronze 9 Total 12

Summer Olympics appearances (overview)
- 1896; 1900–1920; 1924; 1928; 1932; 1936; 1948; 1952; 1956; 1960; 1964; 1968; 1972; 1976; 1980; 1984; 1988; 1992; 1996; 2000; 2004; 2008; 2012; 2016; 2020; 2024; 2028

Bulgaria competed at the 2004 Summer Olympics in Athens, Greece, from 13 to 29 August 2004. This was the nation's seventeenth appearance at the Summer Olympics, except for three occasions, including the 1948 Summer Olympics in London due to the nation's role in World War II and 1984 Summer Olympics in Los Angeles because of the Soviet boycott. The Bulgarian Olympic Committee sent 95 athletes, 49 men and 46 women, to compete in 19 sports. Shooting champion and four-time Olympian Mariya Grozdeva became the nation's first ever female flag bearer in the opening ceremony.

== Medalists ==
Medal	Name	Sport	Event	Date
Gold	Mariya Grozdeva	Shooting	Women's 25 m pistol	August 18
Gold	Milen Dobrev	Weightlifting	Men's 94 kg	August 23
Silver	Yordan Yovchev	Gymnastics	Men's rings	August 22
Bronze	Boris Georgiev	Boxing	Light welterweight	August 28
Bronze	Yordan Yovchev	Gymnastics	Men's floor	August 22
Bronze	Zhaneta Ilieva; Eleonora Kezhova; Zornitsa Marinova; Kristina Ranguelova; Galina Tancheva; Vladislava Tancheva	Gymnastics	Women's rhythmic group all-around	August 28
Bronze	Georgi Georgiev	Judo	Men's 66 kg	August 15
Bronze	Ivo Yanakiev	Rowing	Men's single sculls	August 19
Bronze	Rumyana Neykova	Rowing	Women's single sculls	August 21
Bronze	Mariya Grozdeva	Shooting	Women's 10 m air pistol	August 15
Bronze	Velichko Cholakov	Weightlifting	Men's +105 kg	August 25
Bronze	Armen Nazaryan	Wrestling	Men's Greco-Roman 60 kg	August 26

== Archery ==
Athlete	Event	Ranking round		Round of 64	Round of 32	Round of 16	Quarterfinals	Semifinals	Final / BM	
Athlete	Event	Score	Seed	Opposition Score	Opposition Score	Opposition Score	Opposition Score	Opposition Score	Opposition Score	Rank
Yavor Hristov	Men's individual	641	42	Proć (POL); W 133–132	Chen S-Y (TPE); L 159–170	Did not advance				

== Athletics ==
Bulgarian athletes have so far achieved qualifying standards in the following athletics events (up to a maximum of 3 athletes in each event at the 'A' Standard, and 1 at the 'B' Standard).

Key

- Note – Ranks given for track events are within the athlete's heat only
- Q = Qualified for the next round
- q = Qualified for the next round as a fastest loser or, in field events, by position without achieving the qualifying target
- NR = National record
- N/A = Round not applicable for the event
- Bye = Athlete not required to compete in round

Men
Field events

Athlete	Event	Qualification		Final	
Athlete	Event	Distance	Position	Distance	Position
Nikolay Atanasov	Long jump	7.90	17	Did not advance	
Spas Bukhalov	Pole vault	5.50	27	Did not advance	
Petar Dachev	Long jump	8.05	13	Did not advance	
Iliyan Efremov	Pole vault	NM	—	Did not advance	
Momchil Karailiev	Triple jump	16.45	22	Did not advance	
Galin Kostadinov	Shot put	17.75	37	Did not advance	
Ivaylo Rusenov	Triple jump	16.39	24	Did not advance	

Women
Track & road events

Athlete	Event	Heat		Quarterfinal		Semifinal		Final	
Athlete	Event	Result	Rank	Result	Rank	Result	Rank	Result	Rank
Mariyana Dimitrova	400 m	51.29	2 Q	—N/a		51.20	4	Did not advance	
Monika Gachevska	200 m	23.71	6	Did not advance					
Ivet Lalova	100 m	11.16	1 Q	11.09	2 Q	11.04	3 Q	11.00	4
Ivet Lalova	200 m	22.88	1 Q	22.81	2 Q	22.56	3 Q	22.57	5
Nevena Mineva	20 km walk	—N/a						DNF	
Daniela Yordanova	1500 m	4:05.87	3 Q	—N/a		4:04.94	5 Q	3:59.10	5

Field events

Athlete	Event	Qualification		Final	
Athlete	Event	Distance	Position	Distance	Position
Mariya Dimitrova	Triple jump	14.16	19	Did not advance	
Hristina Georgieva	Javelin throw	55.13	32	Did not advance	
Tsvetanka Khristova	Discus throw	43.25	41	Did not advance	
Aneliya Kumanova	Shot put	15.91	30	Did not advance	
Tanya Stefanova	Pole vault	4.15	=24	Did not advance	
Venelina Veneva	High jump	1.92	15	Did not advance	
Antoniya Yordanova	Long jump	6.45	21	Did not advance	

== Badminton ==
Bulgaria has qualified two spots in the women's singles and doubles.

Athlete	Event	Round of 32	Round of 16	Quarterfinal	Semifinal	Final / BM	
Athlete	Event	Opposition Score	Opposition Score	Opposition Score	Opposition Score	Opposition Score	Rank
Petya Nedelcheva	Women's singles	Rasmussen (DEN); W 8–11, 11–7, 13–11	Seo Y-H (KOR); W 7–11, 11–5, 11–8	Zhou M (CHN); L 4–11, 1–11	Did not advance		
Neli Boteva; Petya Nedelcheva	Women's doubles	Tripp / Wright (GBR); L 15–17, 14–17	Did not advance				

== Boxing ==
Bulgaria sent five boxers to Athens, winning a bronze medal to join a five-way tie for 16th place in the boxing medals scoreboard. Their combined record was 5-5.

Athlete	Event	Round of 32	Round of 16	Quarterfinals	Semifinals	Final	
Athlete	Event	Opposition Result	Opposition Result	Opposition Result	Opposition Result	Opposition Result	Rank
Salim Salimov	Light flyweight	Pannon (THA); L 14–26	Did not advance				
Detelin Dalakliev	Bantamweight	Aferalign (ETH); W RSC	Mammadov (AZE); L 16–35	Did not advance			
Dimitar Shtilianov	Lightweight	Aydın (TUR); W 20–11	Khan (GBR); L 21–37	Did not advance			
Boris Georgiev	Light welterweight	Fillali (ALG); W RSC	Allen (USA); W 30–10	Karimzhanov (KAZ); W 20–18	Johnson (CUB); L 9–13	Did not advance	Bronze medal
Sergey Rozhnov	Super heavyweight	—N/a	Povetkin (RUS); L RSC	Did not advance			

== Canoeing ==
=== Sprint ===
Men

Athlete	Event	Heats		Semifinals		Final	
Athlete	Event	Time	Rank	Time	Rank	Time	Rank
Stanimir Atanasov	C-1 500 m	1:52.917	5 q	1:50.631	2 Q	1:49.759	8
Stanimir Atanasov	C-1 1000 m	3:55.590	2 q	4:05.664	6	Did not advance	
Petar Merkov	K-1 500 m	1:38.725	3 q	1:42.207	6	Did not advance	
Ivan Hristov; Yordan Yordanov	K-2 500 m	1:33.222	4 q	1:33.182	5	Did not advance	
Ivan Hristov; Milko Kazanov; Petar Merkov; Yordan Yordanov	K-4 1000 m	2:54.252	2 Q	Bye		2:59.622	4

Women

Athlete	Event	Heats		Semifinals		Final	
Athlete	Event	Time	Rank	Time	Rank	Time	Rank
Delyana Dacheva; Bonka Pindzheva	K-2 500 m	1:44.268	5 q	1:44.246	1 Q	1:42.553	6

Qualification Legend: Q = Qualify to final; q = Qualify to semifinal

== Cycling ==
=== Road ===
Athlete	Event	Time	Rank
Dmitar Gospodinov	Men's road race	Did not finish	

=== Track ===
Sprint

Athlete	Event	Qualification		Round 1	Repechage 1	Quarterfinals	Semifinals	Final	
Athlete	Event	Time Speed (km/h)	Rank	Opposition Time Speed (km/h)	Opposition Time Speed (km/h)	Opposition Time Speed (km/h)	Opposition Time Speed (km/h)	Opposition Time Speed (km/h)	Rank
Evgenia Radanova	Women's sprint	12.457; 57.798	12	Meares (AUS); L	Grankovskaya (RUS); Reed (USA); L	Did not advance		9th place final Pendleton (GBR); Reed (USA); Hijgenaar (NED); L	12

Time trial

Athlete	Event	Time	Rank
Radoslav Konstantinov	Men's time trial	1:06.265	17

== Equestrian ==
=== Show jumping ===
Athlete	Horse	Event	Qualification								Final					Total	
Athlete	Horse	Event	Round 1		Round 2			Round 3			Round A		Round B			Total	
Athlete	Horse	Event	Penalties	Rank	Penalties	Total	Rank	Penalties	Total	Rank	Penalties	Rank	Penalties	Total	Rank	Penalties	Rank
Rossen Raitchev	Medoc II	Individual	5	=31	12	17	=42	8	25	40 Q	21	43	Did not advance			21	43

== Gymnastics ==
=== Artistic ===
Bulgaria has qualified three gymnasts (two males and one female).

Men

Athlete	Event	Qualification								Final							
Athlete	Event	Apparatus						Total	Rank	Apparatus						Total	Rank
Athlete	Event	F	PH	R	V	PB	HB	Total	Rank	F	PH	R	V	PB	HB	Total	Rank
Filip Yanev	All-around	9.012	8.300	8.137	9.625	8.375	9.137	52.586	46	Did not advance							
Filip Yanev	Vault	—N/a			9.625	—N/a		9.625	13 Q	—N/a			9.581	—N/a		9.581	5
Yordan Yovchev	Floor	9.700	—N/a					9.700	9 Q	9.775	—N/a					9.775	Bronze medal
Yordan Yovchev	Rings	9.812	—N/a					9.812	2 Q	9.850	—N/a					9.850	Silver medal

Women

Athlete	Event	Qualification						Final					
Athlete	Event	Apparatus				Total	Rank	Apparatus				Total	Rank
Athlete	Event	V	UB	BB	F	Total	Rank	V	UB	BB	F	Total	Rank
Evgeniya Kuznetsova	Uneven bars	—N/a	8.150	—N/a		8.150	81	Did not advance					
Evgeniya Kuznetsova	Balance beam	—N/a		8.887	—N/a	8.887	46	Did not advance					

=== Rhythmic ===
Athlete	Event	Qualification						Final					
Athlete	Event	Hoop	Ball	Clubs	Ribbon	Total	Rank	Hoop	Ball	Clubs	Ribbon	Total	Rank
Elizabeth Paisieva	Individual	24.975	21.975	23.850	23.975	94.775	12	Did not advance					
Simona Peycheva	Individual	25.475	24.800	24.700	23.725	98.700	7 Q	25.375	25.675	25.600	24.400	101.050	6

Athlete	Event	Qualification				Final			
Athlete	Event	5 ribbons	3 hoops 2 balls	Total	Rank	5 ribbons	3 hoops 2 balls	Total	Rank
Zhaneta Ilieva; Eleonora Kezhova; Zornitsa Marinova; Kristina Ranguelova; Galina Tancheva; Vladislava Tancheva	Team	22.300	24.600	46.900	3 Q	23.400	25.200	48.600	Bronze medal

== Judo ==
Bulgaria has qualified two judoka.

Athlete	Event	Round of 32	Round of 16	Quarterfinals	Semifinals	Repechage 1	Repechage 2	Repechage 3	Final / BM	
Athlete	Event	Opposition Result	Opposition Result	Opposition Result	Opposition Result	Opposition Result	Opposition Result	Opposition Result	Opposition Result	Rank
Georgi Georgiev	Men's −66 kg	Margoshvili (GEO); W 1010–0012	Demirel (TUR); W 1020–0001	Kipshakbayev (KAZ); W 0100–0001	Uchishiba (JPN); L 0000–1000	Bye			Peñas (ESP); W 0001–0000	3rd place, bronze medalist(s)
Tsvetana Bozhilova	Women's +78 kg	Zambotti (MEX); L 0000–1010	Did not advance							

== Rowing ==
Men

Athlete	Event	Heats		Repechage		Semifinals		Final	
Athlete	Event	Time	Rank	Time	Rank	Time	Rank	Time	Rank
Ivo Yanakiev	Single sculls	7:28.97	2 R	6:52.51	1 SA/B/C	6:53.43	2 FA	6:52.80	3rd place, bronze medalist(s)

Women

Athlete	Event	Heats		Repechage		Semifinals		Final	
Athlete	Event	Time	Rank	Time	Rank	Time	Rank	Time	Rank
Rumyana Neykova	Single sculls	7:35.66	1 SA/B/C	Bye		7:32.06	2 FA	7:23.10	3rd place, bronze medalist(s)
Anna Chuk; Milka Tancheva	Pair	7:52.45	3 R	7:17.16	3 FB	—N/a		7:11.89	8
Anet-Jacqueline Buschmann; Miglena Markova	Double sculls	7:35.46	2 R	6:52.78	1 FA	—N/a		7:13.97	4

Qualification Legend: FA=Final A (medal); FB=Final B (non-medal); FC=Final C (non-medal); FD=Final D (non-medal); FE=Final E (non-medal); FF=Final F (non-medal); SA/B=Semifinals A/B; SC/D=Semifinals C/D; SE/F=Semifinals E/F; R=Repechage

== Sailing ==
Men

Athlete	Event	Race											Net points	Final rank
Athlete	Event	1	2	3	4	5	6	7	8	9	10	M*	Net points	Final rank
Veselin Nanev	Mistral	33	~~DNF~~	33	30	30	32	30	29	33	25	30	305	33

Women

Athlete	Event	Race											Net points	Final rank
Athlete	Event	1	2	3	4	5	6	7	8	9	10	M*	Net points	Final rank
Irina Konstantinova	Mistral	20	~~22~~	8	20	13	10	16	18	17	16	14	152	19

M = Medal race; OCS = On course side of the starting line; DSQ = Disqualified; DNF = Did not finish; DNS= Did not start; RDG = Redress given

== Shooting ==
Men

Athlete	Event	Qualification		Final	
Athlete	Event	Points	Rank	Points	Rank
Tanyu Kiryakov	10 m air pistol	583	=4 Q	683.4	4
Tanyu Kiryakov	50 m pistol	562	6 Q	654.3	7
Emil Milev	25 m rapid fire pistol	582	9	Did not advance	

Women

Athlete	Event	Qualification		Final	
Athlete	Event	Points	Rank	Points	Rank
Mariya Grozdeva	10 m air pistol	386	=2 Q	482.3*	3rd place, bronze medalist(s)
Mariya Grozdeva	25 m pistol	585	3 Q	688.2 OR	1st place, gold medalist(s)

== Swimming ==
Bulgarian swimmers earned qualifying standards in the following events (up to a maximum of 2 swimmers in each event at the A-standard time, and 1 at the B-standard time):

Men

Athlete	Event	Heat		Semifinal		Final	
Athlete	Event	Time	Rank	Time	Rank	Time	Rank
Mihail Alexandrov	200 m freestyle	1:52.12	31	Did not advance			
Mihail Alexandrov	200 m breaststroke	2:17.19	28	Did not advance			
Mihail Alexandrov	200 m individual medley	2:02.39	18	Did not advance			
Raichin Antonov	50 m freestyle	23.67	52	Did not advance			
Raichin Antonov	100 m freestyle	52.33	52	Did not advance			
Georgi Palazov	100 m butterfly	54.91 NR	40	Did not advance			
Georgi Palazov	200 m butterfly	2:02.15	26	Did not advance			
Petar Stoychev	400 m freestyle	3:59.86	32	—N/a		Did not advance	
Petar Stoychev	1500 m freestyle	15:28.32	17	—N/a		Did not advance	

Women

Athlete	Event	Heat		Final	
Athlete	Event	Time	Rank	Time	Rank
Ana Dangalakova	400 m individual medley	5:01.00	23	Did not advance	
Ivanka Moralieva	400 m freestyle	4:25.92	36	Did not advance	
Ivanka Moralieva	800 m freestyle	9:03.13	26	Did not advance	

== Synchronized swimming ==
Athlete	Event	Technical routine		Free routine (preliminary)			Free routine (final)		
Athlete	Event	Points	Rank	Points	Total (technical + free)	Rank	Points	Total (technical + free)	Rank
Assia Anastassova; Bogdana Zareva	Duet	41.583	20	41.834	83.417	20	Did not advance		

== Tennis ==
Athlete	Event	Round of 64	Round of 32	Round of 16	Quarterfinals	Semifinals	Final / BM	
Athlete	Event	Opposition Score	Opposition Score	Opposition Score	Opposition Score	Opposition Score	Opposition Score	Rank
Magdalena Maleeva	Women's singles	Koukalová (CZE); W 6–1, 6–4	Daniilidou (GRE); L 6–2, 4–6, 4-6	Did not advance				

== Volleyball ==
=== Beach ===
Athlete	Event	Preliminary round	Standing	Round of 16	Quarterfinals	Semifinals	Final	
Athlete	Event	Opposition Score	Standing	Opposition Score	Opposition Score	Opposition Score	Opposition Score	Rank
Petia Yanchulova; Tzvetelina Yanchulova	Women's	Pool E Cook – Sanderson (AUS); L 0 – 2 (16–21, 12–21); Pohl – Rau (GER); W 2 – 1 (18–21, 21–19, 15–13); Wang L – You Wh (CHN); W 2 – 0 (21–19, 21–17)	3 Q	Bede – Behar (BRA); L 1 – 2 (21–18, 16–21, 11–15)	Did not advance			

== Weightlifting ==
Bulgaria has qualified the following quota places.

Men

Athlete	Event	Snatch		Clean & Jerk		Total	Rank
Athlete	Event	Result	Rank	Result	Rank	Total	Rank
Sevdalin Minchev	−62 kg	137.5	4	~~170~~	DNF	137.5	DNF
Ivan Stoitsov	−77 kg	155	=11	200	=2	355	7
Milen Dobrev	−94 kg	187.5 =OR	1	220	=1	407.5	1st place, gold medalist(s)
Nikolay Kolev	−94 kg	177.5	6	~~217.5~~	DNF	177.5	DNF
Velichko Cholakov	+105 kg	207.5	2	240	=4	447.5	3rd place, bronze medalist(s)

Women

Athlete	Event	Snatch		Clean & Jerk		Total	Rank
Athlete	Event	Result	Rank	Result	Rank	Total	Rank
Izabela Dragneva	−48 kg	82.5	=4	105	=6	187.5	5
Zlatina Atanasova	−58 kg	90	=11	115	12	205	12
Slaveyka Ruzhinska	−69 kg	115	4	135	=4	250	4
Milena Trendafilova	−69 kg	105	=6	132.5	6	237.5	6

== Wrestling ==
Key

- VT – Victory by Fall.
- PP - Decision by Points - the loser with technical points.
- PO - Decision by Points - the loser without technical points.

Men's freestyle

Athlete	Event	Elimination Pool				Quarterfinal	Semifinal	Final / BM	
Athlete	Event	Opposition Result	Opposition Result	Opposition Result	Rank	Opposition Result	Opposition Result	Opposition Result	Rank
Radoslav Velikov	−55 kg	Williams (RSA); W 4–1 ^{SP}	Li Zy (CHN); L 1–3 ^{PP}	—N/a	2	Did not advance			9
Ivan Djorev	−60 kg	Quintana (CUB); L 0–3 ^{PO}	Kumar (IND); L 0–3 ^{PO}	—N/a	3	Did not advance			18
Serafim Barzakov	−66 kg	MacDonald (CAN); W 4–0 ^{ST}	Spiridonov (KAZ); L 1–3 ^{PP}	—N/a	2	Did not advance			8
Nikolay Paslar	−74 kg	Brzozowski (POL); L 1–3 ^{PP}	Osmanov (MKD); W 3–1 ^{PP}	—N/a	2	Did not advance			11
Miroslav Gochev	−84 kg	Ibragimov (MKD); W 3–1 ^{PP}	Moon E-J (KOR); L 1–3 ^{PP}	—N/a	2	Did not advance			12
Krasimir Kochev	−96 kg	Krupnyakov (KGZ); L 1–3 ^{PP}	Ibragimov (UZB); L 0–3 ^{PO}	—N/a	3	Did not advance			17
Bozhidar Boyadzhiev	−120 kg	Rezaei (IRI); L 0–3 ^{PO}	Hrynkevich (BLR); W 3–1 ^{PP}	Ösökhbayar (MGL); W 5–0 ^{VT}	2	Did not advance			8

Men's Greco-Roman

Athlete	Event	Elimination Pool				Quarterfinal	Semifinal	Final / BM	
Athlete	Event	Opposition Result	Opposition Result	Opposition Result	Rank	Opposition Result	Opposition Result	Opposition Result	Rank
Armen Nazaryan	−60 kg	El-Gharably (EGY); W 3–1 ^{PP}	Khvoshch (UKR); W 3–1 ^{PP}	—N/a	1 Q	Sasamoto (JPN); W 3–1 ^{PP}	Jung J-H (KOR); L 1–3 ^{PP}	Shevtsov (RUS); W 3–1 ^{PP}	3rd place, bronze medalist(s)
Nikolay Gergov	−66 kg	Füredy (HUN); W 3–1 ^{PP}	Kim I-S (KOR); L 0–3 ^{PO}	—N/a	2	Did not advance			14
Vladislav Metodiev	−84 kg	Thomberg (EST); W 3–0 ^{PO}	Yerlikaya (TUR); L 1–3 ^{PP}	Daragan (UKR); L 0–5 ^{VB}	3	Did not advance			12
Kaloyan Dinchev	−96 kg	Tarkong (PLW); W 4–0 ^{ST}	Chkhaidze (KGZ); L 1–3 ^{PP}	—N/a	2	Did not advance			8
Sergei Mureiko	−120 kg	Mikulski (POL); W 3–0 ^{PO}	Gardner (USA); L 1–3 ^{PP}	Mizgaitis (LTU); W 3–1 ^{PP}	2	Did not advance			8

Women's freestyle

Athlete	Event	Elimination Pool			Classification	Semifinal	Final / BM	
Athlete	Event	Opposition Result	Opposition Result	Rank	Opposition Result	Opposition Result	Opposition Result	Rank
Stanka Zlateva	−72 kg	Hamaguchi (JPN); L 0–4 ^{ST}	Montgomery (USA); L 0–5 ^{VT}	3	Did not advance			12

== See also ==
- Bulgaria at the 2004 Summer Paralympics
