= Gymnastics at the 2004 Summer Olympics – Women's rhythmic qualification =

24 gymnasts from 19 countries competed in the qualification round of the Gymnastics at the 2004 Summer Olympics – Women's rhythmic individual all-around competition. The types of apparatus included were the hoop, ball, clubs and ribbon. The top 10 gymnasts advanced to the final round.

== Final qualifiers ==
Gymnast	Gymnast	Gymnast	Gymnast	Gymnast
Svetlana Rudalova; Belarus Qualification: 10	Inna Zhukova; Belarus Qualification: 8	Simona Peycheva; Bulgaria Qualification: 7	Eleni Andriola; Greece Qualification: 6	Aliya Yussupova; Kazakhstan Qualification: 5
Alina Kabaeva; Russia Qualification: 1	Irina Tchachina; Russia Qualification: 2	Almudena Cid; Spain Qualification: 9	Anna Bessonova; Ukraine Qualification: 3	Natalia Godunko; Ukraine Qualification: 4

== Overall results ==
Rank	Gymnast	Nation	Hoop (rhythmic gymnastics)	Ball (rhythmic gymnastics)	Clubs (rhythmic gymnastics)	Ribbon (rhythmic gymnastics)	Total	Qual.
1	Alina Kabaeva	Russia	26.050 (2)	27.250 (1)	26.475 (2)	26.100 (2)	105.875	Q
2	Irina Tchachina	Russia	26.450 (1)	26.700 (3)	25.800 (4)	26.725 (1)	105.675	Q
3	Anna Bessonova	Ukraine	25.900 (4)	26.750 (2)	26.750 (1)	25.325 (3)	104.725	Q
4	Natalia Godunko	Ukraine	25.975 (3)	25.900 (5)	26.075 (3)	24.800 (5)	102.750	Q
5	Aliya Yussupova	Kazakhstan	25.800 (5)	26.150 (4)	25.725 (5)	23.825 (8)	101.500	Q
6	Eleni Andriola	Greece	24.850 (9)	25.350 (6)	24.500 (9)	24.900 (4)	99.600	Q
7	Simona Peycheva	Bulgaria	25.475 (6)	24.800 (8)	24.700 (=7)	23.725 (9)	98.700	Q
8	Inna Zhukova	Belarus	24.575 (10)	24.200 (12)	25.100 (6)	24.700 (6)	98.575	Q
9	Almudena Cid	Spain	24.975 (=7)	24.900 (7)	24.700 (=7)	23.150 (12)	97.725	Q
10	Svetlana Rudalova	Belarus	23.925 (=12)	24.600 (9)	24.350 (10)	23.050 (13)	95.925	Q
11	Theodora Pallidou	Greece	24.150 (11)	24.475 (10)	23.200 (14)	23.400 (10)	95.225	R
12	Elizabeth Paisieva	Bulgaria	24.975 (=7)	21.975 (20)	23.850 (11)	23.975 (7)	94.775	R
13	Laura Zacchilli	Italy	23.925 (=12)	24.225 (11)	23.250 (13)	22.700 (14)	94.100	-
14	Anna Gurbanova	Azerbaijan	22.775 (15)	23.525 (13)	22.800 (17)	23.200 (11)	92.300	-
15	Mary Sanders	United States	21.250 (19)	23.250 (14)	23.400 (12)	22.100 (16)	90.000	-
16	Katerina Pisetsky	Israel	22.675 (16)	22.750 (17)	23.100 (15)	21.425 (18)	89.950	-
17	Zhong Ling	China	20.875 (20)	22.400 (19)	22.950 (16)	22.400 (15)	88.625	-
18	Yukari Murata	Japan	21.775 (18)	22.425 (18)	22.400 (18)	21.550 (17)	88.150	-
19	Lisa Ingildeeva	Germany	22.825 (14)	22.900 (=15)	22.150 (19)	19.650 (21)	87.525	-
20	Dominika Červenková	Czech Republic	22.350 (17)	22.900 (=15)	18.300 (24)	21.200 (20)	84.750	-
21	Hannah McKibbin	Great Britain	20.675 (21)	20.800 (21)	19.600 (20)	21.225 (19)	82.300	-
22	Stephanie Sandler	South Africa	18.550 (23)	18.525 (24)	19.100 (22)	17.100 (22)	73.275	-
23	Penelope Blackmore	Australia	19.575 (22)	19.325 (22)	19.600 (20)	14.550 (24)	73.050	-
24	Wania Monteiro	Cape Verde	18.050 (24)	18.550 (23)	18.400 (23)	16.900 (23)	71.900	-

== Results in particular events ==
=== Hoop ===
Rank	Gymnast	Nation	TV	AV	EX	Pen.	Total
1	Irina Tchachina	Russia	8.500	8.800	9.150		26.450
2	Alina Kabaeva	Russia	8.600	8.500	8.950		26.050
3	Natalia Godunko	Ukraine	8.100	9.000	8.875		25.975
4	Anna Bessonova	Ukraine	7.900	9.200	8.800		25.900
5	Aliya Yussupova	Kazakhstan	7.900	9.100	8.800		25.800
6	Simona Peycheva	Bulgaria	7.800	9.000	8.725	0.05	25.475
=7	Almudena Cid	Spain	7.300	8.900	8.775		24.975
=7	Elizabeth Paisieva	Bulgaria	7.600	8.600	8.775		24.975
9	Eleni Andriola	Greece	7.500	8.800	8.550		24.850
10	Inna Zhukova	Belarus	7.300	8.400	8.875		24.575

=== Ball ===
Rank	Gymnast	Nation	TV	AV	EX	Pen.	Total
1	Alina Kabaeva	Russia	8.700	9.300	9.250		27.250
2	Anna Bessonova	Ukraine	8.400	9.200	9.150		26.750
3	Irina Tchachina	Russia	8.200	9.300	9.200		26.700
4	Aliya Yussupova	Kazakhstan	8.100	9.100	8.950		26.150
5	Natalia Godunko	Ukraine	8.100	8.900	8.900		25.900
6	Eleni Andriola	Greece	7.600	8.850	8.900		25.350
7	Almudena Cid	Spain	7.200	8.900	8.800		24.900
8	Simona Peycheva	Bulgaria	7.900	8.700	8.300	0.10	24.800
9	Svetlana Rudalova	Belarus	6.900	9.000	8.750	0.05	24.600
10	Theodora Pallidou	Greece	7.100	8.800	8.575		24.475

=== Clubs ===
Rank	Gymnast	Nation	TV	AV	EX	Pen.	Total
1	Anna Bessonova	Ukraine	8.400	9.200	9.150		26.750
2	Alina Kabaeva	Russia	8.500	9.100	9.125	0.05	26.475
3	Natalia Godunko	Ukraine	8.100	9.000	8.975		26.075
4	Irina Tchachina	Russia	8.000	8.850	8.950		25.800
5	Aliya Yussupova	Kazakhstan	7.800	8.800	9.125		25.725
6	Inna Zhukova	Belarus	7.450	8.650	9.000	0.10	25.100
=7	Simona Peycheva	Bulgaria	7.800	8.450	8.450		24.700
=7	Almudena Cid	Spain	6.750	9.100	8.850		24.700
9	Eleni Andriola	Greece	7.800	8.100	8.600		24.500
10	Svetlana Rudalova	Belarus	7.450	8.500	8.400		24.350

=== Ribbon ===
Rank	Gymnast	Nation	TV	AV	EX	Pen.	Total
1	Irina Tchachina	Russia	8.200	9.300	9.225		26.725
2	Alina Kabaeva	Russia	8.400	9.000	8.700		26.100
3	Anna Bessonova	Ukraine	8.100	8.100	9.125		25.325
4	Eleni Andriola	Greece	7.500	8.700	8.700		24.900
5	Natalia Godunko	Ukraine	7.900	8.000	8.900		24.800
6	Inna Zhukova	Belarus	7.900	8.000	8.800		24.700
7	Elizabeth Paisieva	Bulgaria	7.100	8.300	8.625	0.05	23.975
8	Aliya Yussupova	Kazakhstan	7.600	7.800	8.475	0.05	23.825
9	Simona Peycheva	Bulgaria	7.700	7.700	8.475	0.15	23.725
10	Theodora Pallidou	Greece	6.700	8.200	8.600	0.10	23.400
