= Proletina Kalcheva =

Bulgarian gymnast (born 1979)

- Пролетина Калчева
- Born: 11 December 1979 (age 46) Burgas, Bulgaria
- Height: 172 cm (5 ft 8 in)

Gymnastics career
- Discipline: Rhythmic gymnastics
- Country represented: Bulgaria
- Club: Chernomore
- Retired: yes

Proletina Kalcheva (Bulgarian: Пролетина Калчева; born 11 December 1979) is a Bulgarian retired rhythmic gymnast. She represented Bulgaria in international competitions.

== Personal life ==
She married Konstantin Nikolov. In 2008 they had a daughter, Elena, who also practice rhythmic gymnastics and was a mascot at the 2018 World Championships in Sofia.

== Career ==
Kalcheva began training in rhythmic gymnastics at the Burgas club Chernomorets. She was a member of the national team for six years and trained with Julia Baicheva, Iliana Raeva and Neshka Robeva.

In 1999 she became the individual champion of Bulgaria. The same year she won the Julieta Shishmanova international tournament. In May she competed at the European Championships in Budapest, being 14th overall. In October she was selected for the World Championships in Osaka, being 6th in teams along Victoria Danova and Teodora Alexandrova.

In 2000 she became the captain of the Bulgarian senior group, in September she competed in the Olympic Games in Sydney alongGabriela Atanasova, Zhaneta Ilieva, Eleonora Kezhova, Galina Marinova and Kristina Rangelova. In Australia the group placed 6th in the preliminaries and 7th in the final.

After the Olympics Kalcheva ended her competitive career, and was named as the most important athlete of the century from the city of Burgas. She left for Spain, where she founded her own rhythmic gymnastics club "Primavera", and trained talents for 20 years. Since 2019 she started working in her childhood club Chernomorets as a coach.

In November 2022 she participated in a celebratory event for the 70th anniversary of the Bulgarian Rhythmic Gymnastics Federation.
