= Gabriela Atanasova =

Bulgarian gymnast (born 1983)

Gabriela Atanova
- Габриела Атанасова
- Born: 16 November 1983 (age 42) Sofia, Bulgaria
- Height: 169 cm (5 ft 7 in)

Gymnastics career
- Discipline: Rhythmic gymnastics
- Country represented: Bulgaria
- Club: Levski Sofia
- Retired: yes
Medal record
Representing Bulgaria
European Championships
Bronze medal – third place	2001 Geneva	3 Ropes + 2 Balls

Gabriela Atanasova (Bulgarian: Габриела Атанасова; born 16 November 1983) is a retired Bulgarian rhythmic gymnast.

== Career ==
Atanasova started her sport career at Levski Sofia. Her biggest achievement was competing at the 2000 Olympic Games in Sydney as a member of the Bulgarian group along with teammates Zhaneta Ilieva, Proletina Kalcheva, Eleonora Kezhova, Galina Marinova and Kristina Rangelova. The team placed 6th in the preliminaries and 7th in the final.

In 2001 she competed at the European Championships in Geneva (with teammates Galina Marinova, Gergana Stefanova, Eleonora Kezhova and Hristina Vitanova). They placed 4th in the all-around and in the 10 clubs final, and they won bronze with 3 ropes and 2 balls.
