= Galina Marinova =

Galina Marinova may refer to:

- Galina Marinova (artistic gymnast) (born 1964), Bulgarian Olympic artistic gymnast
- Galina Marinova (rhythmic gymnast) (born 1985), Bulgarian Olympic rhythmic gymnast
