= Gymnastics at the 2004 Summer Olympics – Men's rings =

Olympic gymnastics event

Men's rings at the Games of the XXVIII Olympiad
- O.A.C.A. Olympic Indoor Hall
- Venue: O.A.C.A. Olympic Indoor Hall
- Dates: 14 August 2004 (qualifying); 22 August 2004 (final)
- Competitors: 77 from 28 nations
- Winning score: 9.862

Medalists
1st place, gold medalist(s)		Dimosthenis Tampakos; Greece
2nd place, silver medalist(s)		Yordan Yovchev; Bulgaria
3rd place, bronze medalist(s)		Jury Chechi; Italy

The men's rings competition was one of eight events for male competitors of the artistic gymnastics discipline contested in the gymnastics at the 2004 Summer Olympics in Athens. The qualification and final rounds took place on August 14 and August 22 at the O.A.C.A. Olympic Indoor Hall. There were 77 competitors from 28 nations, with nations competing in the team event having up to 5 gymnasts and other nations having up to 2 gymnasts. The event was won by Dimosthenis Tampakos of Greece, the nation's first victory in the rings since 1896 and second overall. Yordan Yovchev of Bulgaria took silver, while Jury Chechi of Italy earned bronze. All three men had previously won a medal in the event; they were the 9th, 10th, and 11th men to win multiple rings medals.

The medals for the competition were presented by Lambis V. Nikolaou, Greece; IOC Executive Board Member, and the medalists' bouquets were presented by Adrian Stoica, Romania; FIG MTC President.

== Background ==
This was the 21st appearance of the event, which is one of the five apparatus events held every time there were apparatus events at the Summer Olympics (no apparatus events were held in 1900, 1908, 1912, or 1920). Five of the eight finalists from 2000 returned: silver medalist Dimosthenis Tampakos of Greece, bronze medalist Yordan Yovchev of Bulgaria, fourth-place finisher Yang Wei of China, fifth-place finisher Ivan Ivankov of Belarus, and eighth-place finisher Roman Zozulya of Ukraine. Also returning was 1996 gold medalist Jury Chechi of Italy, who had missed the 2000 Games due to injury and was attempting a comeback at the age of 35. Yovchev had won the world championship in 2001, finished second in 2002, and shared the championship with Tampakos in 2003.

Colombia, Malaysia, and Tunisia each made their debut in the men's rings. The United States made its 19th appearance, most of any nation; the Americans had missed only the inaugural 1896 rings and the boycotted 1980 Games.

== Competition format ==
The 1996 gymnastics competition had introduced the "7–6–5" format, in which each team had 7 members, designated 6 for each apparatus, and had 5 count for team scores. In 2000, this was reduced across the board to a "6–5–4" format; the 2004 competition kept this format. Further, while in 1996 all 7 team members could compete on each apparatus for individual purposes, in 2000 and 2004 only the 5 designated for that apparatus competed. The 2000 competition had also eliminated the compulsory exercises; only voluntary exercises were done on each apparatus. The qualifying round scores were used for qualification for the team all-around, individual all-around, and apparatus finals.

The top eight gymnasts, with a limit of two per nation, advanced to the final. Non-finalists were ranked 9th through 80th based on preliminary score. The preliminary score had no effect on the final; once the eight finalists were selected, their ranking depended only on the final exercise.

== Schedule ==
All times are Greece Standard Time (UTC+2)

Date	Time	Round
Saturday, 14 August 2004		Qualifying
Sunday, 22 August 2004	22:14	Final

== Results ==
=== Qualifying ===
Seventy-seven gymnasts competed in the rings event in the artistic gymnastics qualification round on August 14. The eight highest scoring gymnasts advanced to the final on August 22.

=== Final ===
Rank	Gymnast	Nation	Start Value	United States	Kazakhstan	Australia	Spain	Brazil	China	Penalty	Total
1st place, gold medalist(s)	Dimosthenis Tampakos	Greece	10.00	9.85	~~9.90~~	9.90	9.85	~~9.75~~	9.85	—	9.862
2nd place, silver medalist(s)	Yordan Yovchev	Bulgaria	10.00	9.85	~~9.90~~	~~9.80~~	9.85	9.85	9.85	—	9.850
3rd place, bronze medalist(s)	Yuri Chechi	Italy	10.00	~~9.80~~	9.80	~~9.85~~	9.85	9.80	9.80	—	9.812
4	Hiroyuki Tomita	Japan	10.00	9.80	9.80	~~9.85~~	9.80	9.80	~~9.75~~	—	9.800
5	Matteo Morandi	Italy	10.00	~~9.80~~	9.80	~~9.75~~	9.80	9.80	9.80	—	9.800
5	Pierre-Yves Bény	France	10.00	~~9.80~~	9.80	9.80	~~9.75~~	9.80	9.80	—	9.800
7	Alexander Safoshkin	Russia	10.00	9.75	~~9.85~~	9.75	9.75	~~9.70~~	9.75	—	9.750
8	Andreas Schweizer	Switzerland	10.00	~~9.70~~	~~9.75~~	9.75	9.75	9.75	9.70	—	9.737
