= Galina Marinova (rhythmic gymnast) =

Bulgarian rhythmic gymnast (born 1985)

Personal information
- Born: 20 April 1985 (age 41) Sofia, Bulgaria
- Height: 172 cm (5 ft 8 in)
- Weight: 49 kg (108 lb)

Sport
- Sport: Rhythmic gymnastics
- Club: Iliana, Sofia
Medal record
Representing Bulgaria
European Championships
Bronze medal – third place	2001 Geneva	3 Ropes + 2 Balls

Galina Marinova (Bulgarian: Галина Маринова; born 20 April 1985) is a retired Bulgarian rhythmic gymnast.

== Career ==
Her biggest achievement was competing at the 2000 Olympic Games in Sydney as a member of the Bulgarian group along with teammates Zhaneta Ilieva, Proletina Kalcheva, Eleonora Kezhova, Gabriela Atanasova and Kristina Rangelova. The team placed 6th in the preliminaries and 7th in the final.

In 2001 she competed at the European Championships in Geneva (with teammates Gabriela Atanasova, Gergana Stefanova, Eleonora Kezhova and Hristina Vitanova). They placed 4th in the all-around and in the 10 clubs final, and they won bronze with 3 ropes and 2 balls.
