= Kalchev =

Kalchev (Bulgarian: Калчев), female Kalcheva, is a Bulgarian surname. Notable people with the surname include:

- Andon Kalchev (1910–1948), Bulgarian scientist and army officer
- Denislav Kalchev (born 1973), Bulgarian swimmer
- Khristina Kalcheva (born 1977), Bulgarian athlete
- Proletina Kalcheva (born 1979), Bulgarian rhythmic gymnast and coach
