= Jury Chechi =

Italian artistic gymnast

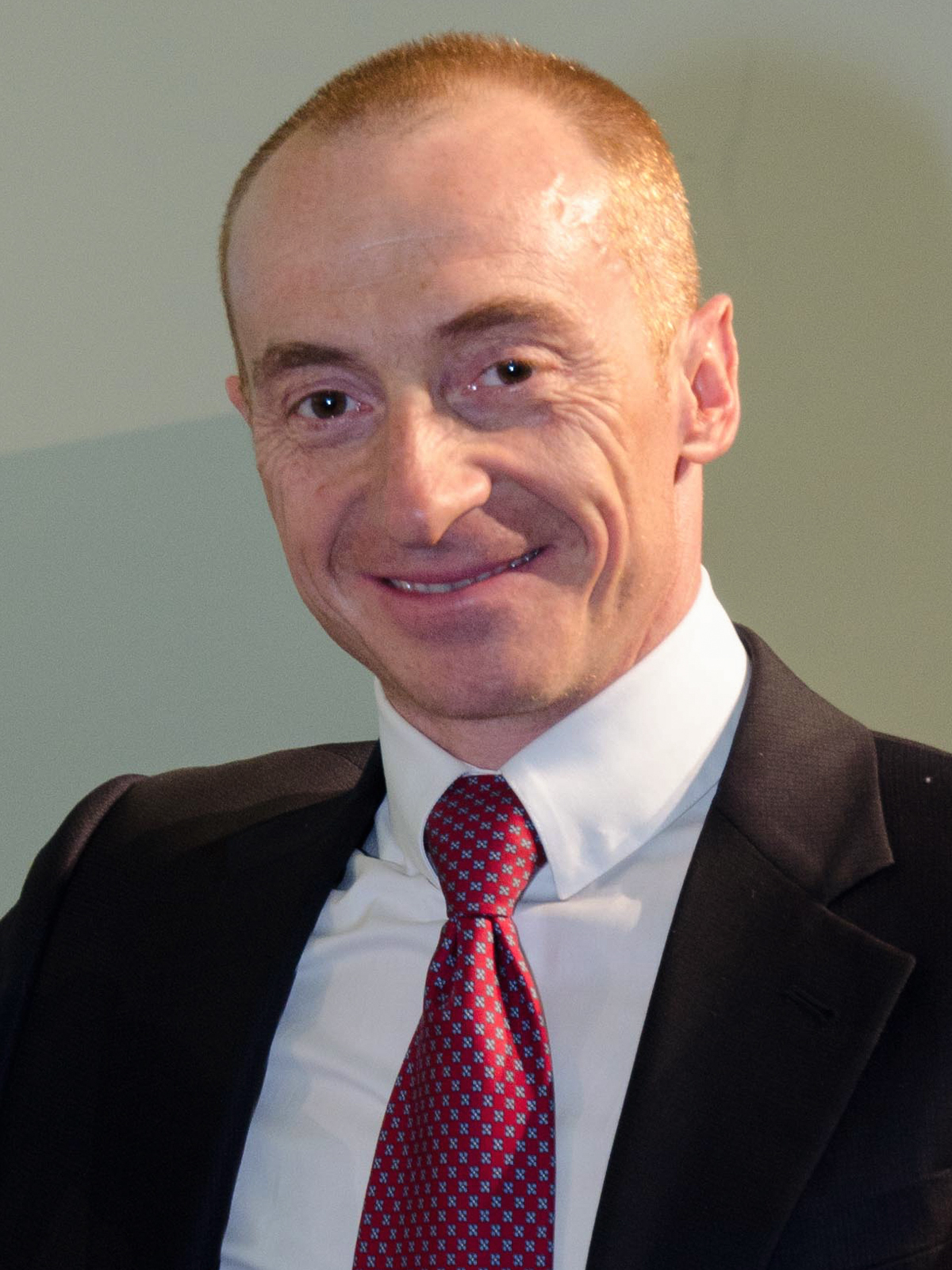
- Chechi in 2012

Personal information
- Nickname: il Signore degli Anelli ("the Lord of the Rings")
- Born: 11 October 1969 (age 56) Prato, Italy
- Height: 1.65 m (5 ft 5 in)

Gymnastics career
- Discipline: Men's artistic gymnastics
- Country represented: Italy
- Club: SG Etruria Prato
- Head coach: Bruno Franceschetti
- Retired: 2004
Medal record
Representing Italy
Men's artistic gymnastics
Olympic Games
Gold medal – first place	1996 Atlanta	Rings
Bronze medal – third place	2004 Athens	Rings
World Championships
Gold medal – first place	1993 Birmingham	Rings
Gold medal – first place	1994 Brisbane	Rings
Gold medal – first place	1995 Sabae	Rings
Gold medal – first place	1996 San Juan	Rings
Gold medal – first place	1997 Lausanne	Rings
Bronze medal – third place	1989 Stuttgart	Rings
Bronze medal – third place	1991 Indianapolis	Rings
European Championships
Gold medal – first place	1990 Lausanne	Rings
Gold medal – first place	1992 Budapest	Rings
Gold medal – first place	1994 Praga	Rings
Gold medal – first place	1996 Copenhagen	Rings
Bronze medal – third place	1990 Lausanne	All-around
Bronze medal – third place	1992 Budapest	Floor
Mediterranean Games
Gold medal – first place	1997 Bari	Team
Gold medal – first place	1997 Bari	Rings
Universiade
Gold medal – first place	1993 Buffalo	Team
Gold medal – first place	1993 Buffalo	Rings
Gold medal – first place	1997 Sicily	Rings
Silver medal – second place	1993 Buffalo	All-around
European Cup
Gold medal – first place	1988 Firenze	Rings
Gold medal – first place	1991 Bruxelles	All-around
Gold medal – first place	1991 Bruxelles	Rings
Gold medal – first place	1991 Bruxelles	Parallel bars
Gold medal – first place	1995 Roma	Rings
Bronze medal – third place	1988 Firenze	Floor
Bronze medal – third place	1988 Firenze	Parallel bars

Jury Chechi Commendatore OMRI (Italian pronunciation: [ˈjuːri ˈkeːki]; born 11 October 1969) is a retired Italian gymnast.

== Biography ==
Chechi was named after cosmonaut Yuri Gagarin. He won the Olympics title in the rings at Atlanta 1996 and was third at Athens 2004. Chechi's bronze was the result of his attempted comeback into the sport at the age of 35, well above what is considered the average age of a male gymnast.

Chechi dominated his speciality, the rings, during the nineties, so he was nicknamed "the Lord of the Rings"; however, he could not participate in the Barcelona 1992 and Sydney 2000 Olympic Games due to serious injuries. He has won five gold and two bronze medals at the World Gymnastics Championships and four gold and two bronze medals at the European Championships.

Chechi was the Italian flagbearer at the opening ceremony in the Athens Games in 2004. He also participated in the 2006 Winter Olympics opening ceremony in Turin.

Jury sparked some controversy at the 2004 Athens Olympic Games when he shook the hand of silver medalist in the rings final, Yordan Yovchev and signalled that he should have won the gold medal, not Dimosthenis Tampakos (meaning that he won only because he was the local champion).

He is an atheist.

== Honours of merit ==

3rd Class / Commander: Commendatore Ordine al Merito della Repubblica Italiana

— 27 September 2004. Initiative by President of the Italian Republic Carlo Azeglio Ciampi.

== See also ==
- Italian men gold medalist at the Olympics and World Championships

Summer Olympics
Preceded by Carlton Myers	Flagbearer for Italy; Athens 2004	Succeeded by Antonio Rossi
