= 2003 European Rhythmic Gymnastics Championships =

2003 Rhythmic Gymnastics European Championships
- Host city: Riesa
- Country: Germany
- Events: 8
- Dates: 4–6 April 2003

The 19th Rhythmic Gymnastics European Championships were held in Riesa, Germany, from 04 to 6 April 2003 37 groups and 17 individual gymnasts took part in this European Championships. Medals were contested in three disciplines: senior groups, junior groups and senior individual finals.

== Medal winners ==
Event	Gold	Silver	Bronze
Senior Individual
Hoop	Anna Bessonova; Ukraine	Zarina Gizikova; Russia	Tamara Yerofeeva; Ukraine
Ball	Zarina Gizikova; Russia	Anna Bessonova; Ukraine	Inna Zhukova; Belarus
Clubs	Anna Bessonova; Ukraine	Tamara Yerofeeva; Ukraine	Simona Peycheva; Bulgaria
Ribbon	Anna Bessonova; Ukraine	Inna Zhukova; Belarus	Tamara Yerofeeva; Ukraine
Senior Groups
All-around	Russia; Olesya Belugina; Tatiana Kurbakova; Yelena Posevina; Natalia Lavrova; Elena Murzina; Olesia Manuilova	Bulgaria; Zhaneta Ilieva; Kristina Rangelova; Eleonora Kezhova; Vladislava Tancheva; Galina Tancheva; Juliana Naydenova	Italy; Elisa Santoni; Elisa Blanchi; Daniela Masseroni; Pamela Mastroianni; Francesca Pasinetti; Francesca Chugurra
3 Hoops + 2 Balls	Bulgaria; Zhaneta Ilieva; Kristina Rangelova; Eleonora Kezhova; Vladislava Tancheva; Galina Tancheva; Juliana Naydenova	Greece; Haritini Ioannou; Zaharula Karami; Evgeniya Kontelia; Haroclia Pantazi; Eleni Chronopoulou; Stiliani Christidou	Italy; Elisa Santoni; Elisa Blanchi; Daniela Masseroni; Pamela Mastroianni; Francesca Pasinetti; Francesca Chugurra
5 Ribbons	Russia; Olesya Belugina; Tatiana Kurbakova; Yelena Posevina; Natalia Lavrova; Elena Murzina; Olesya Manuilova	Bulgaria; Zhaneta Ilieva; Kristina Rangelova; Eleonora Kezhova; Vladislava Tancheva; Galina Tancheva; Juliana Naydenova	Belarus; Natalia Prokopova; Maria Paplyka; Natalia Palchevskaya; Ilona Osyadovskaya; Zlatislava Nersesyan; Natalia Alexandrova
Junior Groups
5 Hoops	Russia	Greece	Bulgaria

== Medal table ==
Rank	Nation	Gold	Silver	Bronze	Total
1	Russia	4	1	0	5
2	Ukraine	3	2	2	7
3	Bulgaria	1	2	2	5
4	Greece	0	2	0	2
5	Belarus	0	1	2	3
6	Italy	0	0	2	2
Totals (6 entries)		8	8	8	24
