= Olessia Manouilova =

Russian rhythmic gymnast

- Full name: Олеся Вячеславовна Мануйлова
- Born: 8 June 1986 (age 40) or 7 June 1986 Perm, Soviet Union

Gymnastics career
- Discipline: Rhythmic gymnastics
- Country represented: Russia
Medal record
Representing Russia
Rhythmic Gymnastics
Event	1st	2nd	3rd
World Championships	2	0	0
European Championships	2	0	0
Total	4	0	0
World Championships
Gold medal – first place	2003 Budapest	Group all-around
Gold medal – first place	2003 Budapest	5 ribbons
Gold medal – first place	2003 Budapest	3 hoops + 2 balls
European Championships
Gold medal – first place	2003 Riesa	Group all-around
Gold medal – first place	2003 Riesa	5 ribbons

Olessia Manouilova (alt. sp.: Olesia Manuilova, Olesya Manuylova; Russian: Олеся Вячеславовна Мануйлова; born 7 or 8 June 1986) is a Russian rhythmic gymnast who competed both as an individual and group member. She is the 2003 European and World champion as a member of the Russian national group.

On the national level, she is the 2001 Russian team event champion and the 2002 team and ball bronze medalist.

== Competitive highlights ==
As an individual gymnast

Year	Event	Team	AA	Hoop	Ball	Clubs	Ribb.
International
2000	Aeon Cup	1st	1st J				
National
2001	Russian Championships	1st					
2002	Russian Championships	3rd	5		3rd		

As a Russian national group member

- 2003 European Rhythmic Gymnastics Championships — (gold) All-around, (gold) 5 ribbons
- 2003 World Rhythmic Gymnastics Championships — (gold) All-around, (gold) 5 ribbons, (gold) 3 hoops + 2 balls
