= Dai Yongjun =

Chinese rhythmic gymnast

- 戴 永君
- Born: 10 December 1984 (age 41) Liaoning, China
- Height: 174 cm (5 ft 9 in)

Gymnastics career
- Discipline: Rhythmic gymnastics
- Country represented: China (2004)
- Retired: yes

Dai Yongjun (born 10 December 1984) is a Chinese retired rhythmic gymnast.

== Career ==
Yongjun took up rhythmic gymnastics in 1992 in Liaoning. In 1996, she was selected into the Liaoning Provincial Rhythmic Gymnastics team. From 1999 to 2003 she won several medals at the Chinese National Rhythmic Gymnastics Championships.

In 2003 she was selected for the World Championships in Budapest as a member of the national group, they finished in 7th place in the All-Around (getting a ticket for the following year's Olympics) and took 4th place in the 5 ribbons' final.

In 2004 she represented China in the rhythmic gymnastics' group event at the 2004 Olympic Games in Athens along Hu Mei, Li Jia, Lu Yingna, Lü Yuanyang and Zhang Shuo. They were 5th in qualification and 6th in the final.

She retired after the Games, choosing to work as a coach in Dalian. She also got married and had two daughters who also compete in rhythmic gymnastics.
