= Maria Kakiou =

Greek rhythmic gymnast

- Born: 29 January 1989 (age 37) Marousi, Greece
- Height: 5 ft 3.5 in (161 cm)

Gymnastics career
- Discipline: Rhythmic gymnastics
- Country represented: Greece (2004–2005 (?))
- Club: Drapetsona

Maria Kakiou (Μαρία Κακίου; born 29 January 1989 in Marousi) was a Greek group rhythmic gymnast. She represents her nation at international competitions.

She participated at the 2004 Summer Olympics in the group all-around event finishing 5th in the final after finishing 4th in the qualification. She competed at world championships, including at the 2005 World Rhythmic Gymnastics Championships.
