= Vladislava Tancheva =

Bulgarian rhythmic gymnast

- Full name: Vladislava Tancheva
- Born: 18 May 1987 (age 39) Varna, Bulgaria
- Height: 1.77 m (5 ft 10 in)

Gymnastics career
- Discipline: Rhythmic gymnastics
- Country represented: Bulgaria; (2001–2009)
- Club: Silva Varna
- Head coach: Iliana Raeva
- Assistant coach: Ina Ananieva
- Choreographer: Tsvetanka Petkova
Medal record
Women's rhythmic gymnastics
Representing Bulgaria
Olympic Games
Bronze medal – third place	2004 Athens	Group all-around
World Championships
Silver medal – second place	2003 Budapest	Group all-around
European Championships
Gold medal – first place	2003 Riesa	3 Hoops 2 Balls
Silver medal – second place	2003 Riesa	Group All-around
Silver medal – second place	2003 Riesa	5 Ribbons

Vladislava Tancheva (Bulgarian: Владислава Танчева; born 18 May 1987 in Varna) is a retired Bulgarian rhythmic gymnast. She contributed to a silver medal effort for the Bulgarian squad in the group all-around at the 2003 World Rhythmic Gymnastics Championships in Budapest, Hungary, and later added a bronze to her career hardware in the same program at the 2004 Summer Olympics in Athens. Tancheva is also the twin sister of fellow rhythmic gymnast Galina Tancheva.

== Career ==
Tancheva made her official debut, along with her twin sister Galina, at the 2003 World Rhythmic Gymnastics Championships in Budapest, Hungary, where she captured the silver medal for the Bulgarian squad in the group all-around tournament with a composite score of 50.175.

At the 2004 Summer Olympics in Athens, Tancheva competed as a member of the Bulgarian women's rhythmic gymnastics team in the group all-around tournament, after receiving a qualifying berth from the World Championships. Teaming with Zhaneta Ilieva, Eleonora Kezhova, Zornitsa Marinova, Kristina Rangelova, and her twin sister Galina in the competition, Tancheva performed a double routine using five ribbons (23.400) and a combination of three hoops and two balls (25.200) to deliver the Bulgarian squad a bronze-medal score in 48.600.

== See also ==
- List of Olympic medalists in gymnastics (women)
