= Penelope Blackmore =

Australian rhythmic gymnast

- Nickname: Penny
- Born: 23 April 1984 (age 42) Melbourne, Australia

Gymnastics career
- Discipline: Rhythmic gymnastics
- Country represented: Australia (1999-2004)
- Retired: yes

Penelope Blackmore (born 23 April 1984) is a retired Australian rhythmic gymnast. She represented her country internationally.

== Biography ==
Penelope started rhythmic gymnastics when she was twelve years old, training five hours a day, six days a week. In 1998 she moved with her family from Melbourne to Sydney. A year later she was selected to compete at both the 1999 World Championships in Osaka and the Four Continents Competition in Jacksonville.

In 2003 she became the Australian national champion. She also competed in the World Championships in Budapest where she finished 49th in the All-Around and 24th in teams.

In 2004 she again won the Australian national championships (2nd Hoop, 1st Ball, 2nd Clubs, 1st Ribbon) which gave her the opportunity to qualify as a wild card entrant in the Athens Olympic Games. There she finished 23rd in the qualification round and thus didn't advance to the final.

After the Games, Blackmore announced her retirement from the sport. She now lives in Germany and runs an organisation that assists businesses to transition and evolve in the digital age.
