= Ilektra-Elli Efthymiou =

Greek rhythmic gymnast

Ilektra Elli Efthymiou
- Born: 24 June 1989 (age 37)
- Height: 5 ft 8 in (173 cm)

Gymnastics career
- Discipline: Rhythmic gymnastics
- Country represented: Greece; (2004–2005 (?))
- Club: AC Palmos Argiroupoli

Ilektra Elli Efthymiou (Ηλέκτρα-Ελλί Ευθυμίου; born 24 June 1989) is a Greek group rhythmic gymnast. She represents her nation at international competitions.

She participated at the 2004 Summer Olympics in the group all-around event finishing 5th in the final after finishing 4th in the qualification. She competed at world championships, including at the 2005 World Rhythmic Gymnastics Championships.
