= Lesley Daly =

Australian trampoline gymnast

- Born: 28 June 1966 (age 60) Bedford, England
- Height: 1.55 m (5 ft 1 in)

Gymnastics career
- Discipline: Trampoline gymnastics
- Country represented: Australia
- Club: Carindale PCYC

Lesley Daly (born 28 June 1966) is an Australian trampoline gymnast who competed at the Athens 2004 Olympic Games.

Daly was born in Bedford, England on 28 June 1966. She grew up in Biloela, near Rockhampton. She trained in trampolining at Carindale PCYC.

At the Athens 2004 Olympics Daly, aged 38, was the oldest trampolining competitor. She competed in the women's individual trampoline event and finished thirteenth.

As of 2026, Daly was coaching young trampolinists at Redland City Gymsports.
