= Eleni Andriola =

Greek rhythmic gymnast (born 1986)

- Born: November 9, 1986 (age 39) Athens, Greece

Gymnastics career
- Discipline: Rhythmic gymnastics
- Country represented: Greece
Medal record
Representing Greece
Rhythmic Gymnastics
Mediterranean Games
Bronze medal – third place	2005 Almería	Individual All-Around

Eleni Andriola (Greek: Ελένη Ανδριόλα, born November 9, 1986) is a Greek rhythmic gymnast.

Born in Athens, she started rhythmic gymnastics in 1994, and she has been on the Greek National Team since 1998. Eleni's first international event was the 2001 World Championships in Madrid, Spain.

Andriola was the top Greek rhythmic gymnast in 2004, as well as in 2003. Her all-around results at the 2003 World Championships in Budapest, Hungary represented a 10-rank improvement from her finish at the 2001 World Championships in Madrid.

She competed at the 2004 Athens Olympics and qualified for the final in 6th with a score of 99.600, in the final she was placed 9th with a score of 97.600. She competed again at the 2008 Summer Olympics in Beijing and finished 21st, with 59.700 points
