= Tatiana Kurbakova =

Russian rhythmic gymnast (born 1986)

Medal record

Representing Russia

Women's Rhythmic gymnastics

Olympic Games
Gold medal – first place	2004 Athens	Group All-around

World Championships
Gold medal – first place	2005 Baku	All-Around
Gold medal – first place	2003 Budapest	All-Around
Gold medal – first place	2003 Budapest	5 Ribbons
Gold medal – first place	2003 Budapest	3 Hoops + 2 Balls
Silver medal – second place	2005 Baku	3 Hoops / 4 Clubs
Bronze medal – third place	2005 Baku	5 Ribbons

European Championships
Gold medal – first place	2003 Riesa	Group All-around
Gold medal – first place	2003 Riesa	5 Ribbons

Tatiana Sergeyevna Kurbakova (Russian: Татьяна Сергеевна Курбакова, born 7 August 1986) is a Russian retired rhythmic gymnast. She won gold in the group competition at the 2004 Summer Olympics in Athens. She is a two-time (2003, 2005) World Group All-around champion and 2003 European Group All-aroundchampion.

== Detailed Olympic results ==
Year	Competition Description	Location	Music	Apparatus	Score-Final	Score-Qualifying
2004	Olympics	Athens		Group All-around	51.100	49.875
2004	Olympics	Athens	Mona Lisa Overdrive music from The Matrix Reloaded by Don Davis & Juno Reactor	5 Ribbons	25.300	24.700
2004	Olympics	Athens	Ironside (excerpt) / White, Crane Lightning / "Don't Let Me Be Misunderstood" music from Kill Bill by Quincy Jones / RZA / Santa Esmeralda	3 Hoops / 2 Balls	25.800	25.175
