= Olga Glatskikh =

Russian rhythmic gymnast (born 1989)

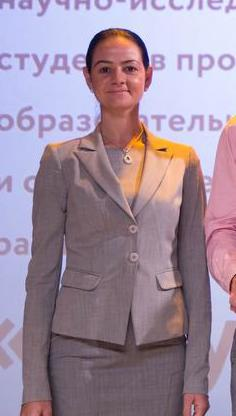
- Glatskikh in 2017

Personal information
- Full name: Olga Viacheslavovna Glatskikh
- Born: 13 February 1989 (age 37) Lesnoy, Sverdlovsk Oblast, Russian SFSR, Soviet Union

Gymnastics career
- Discipline: Rhythmic gymnastics
Medal record
Women's rhythmic gymnastics
Representing Russia
Olympic Games
Gold medal – first place	2004 Athens	Group All-around
World Championships
Gold medal – first place	2005 Baku	All-Around
Silver medal – second place	2005 Baku	3 Hoops / 4 Clubs
Bronze medal – third place	2005 Baku	5 Ribbons

Olga Viacheslavovna Glatskikh (Russian: Ольга Вячеславовна Глацких; born 13 February 1989) is a retired Russian rhythmic gymnast. She won a gold medal in the group competition at the 2004 Summer Olympics in Athens.

In 2006, she was decorated by the Order of Friendship by presidential decree.

== 2018 scandal ==
As of 2018, Glatskikh was the director of the Department of Youth Politics of Sverdlovsk Oblast. On 5 November, she made national headlines when, speaking in Kirovgrad, she stated that the state did not ask the citizens to make children and therefore the children should not expect to receive any support from the government. The governor, Yevgeny Kuyvashyov, on the same day dismissed the statement by Glatskikh as incorrect. Glatskikh was suspended from her job on the next day, while the Investigative Committee of Russia began an investigation into allegations of corruption and misappropriation of approximately 131 million rubles (1.78 million dollars) in her department.
