= Natalia Lavrova =

Russian rhythmic gymnast

- Full name: Natalia Aleksandrovna Lavrova
- Born: 4 August 1984 Penza, Russian SFSR, Soviet Union
- Died: 23 April 2010 (aged 25) Penza Oblast, Russia

Gymnastics career
- Discipline: Rhythmic gymnastics
- Country represented: Russia
- Head coach: Irina Viner
- Former coach: Olga Stebeneva
Medal record
Representing Russia
Group Rhythmic Gymnastics
Olympic Games
Gold medal – first place	2000 Sydney	Group All-around
Gold medal – first place	2004 Athens	Group All-around
World Championships
Gold medal – first place	1999 Osaka	Group All-around
Gold medal – first place	2002 New Orleans	Group All-around
Gold medal – first place	2003 Budapest	Group All-around
Gold medal – first place	2003 Budapest	5 Ribbons
Gold medal – first place	2003 Budapest	2 Balls + 3 Hoops
Silver medal – second place	1999 Osaka	3 Ribbons + 2 Hoops
Silver medal – second place	2002 New Orleans	5 Ribbons
Bronze medal – third place	1999 Osaka	10 Clubs
European Championships
Gold medal – first place	2001 Geneva	Group All-around
Gold medal – first place	2001 Geneva	10 Clubs
Gold medal – first place	2003 Riesa	Group All-around
Gold medal – first place	2003 Riesa	5 Ribbons
World Cup Final
Gold medal – first place	2004 Moscow	5 Ribbons
Gold medal – first place	2004 Moscow	2 Balls + 3 Hoops

Natalia Aleksandrovna Lavrova (Russian: Наталья Александровна Лаврова, 4 August 1984 – 23 April 2010) was a dual Olympic gold medalist. Lavrova was the first group rhythmic gymnast to win two gold medals in the rhythmic gymnastics group event at the 2000 and 2004 Summer Olympics.

== Life and career ==
Lavrova was born in Penza, Soviet Union. Her first coach was Olga Stebeneva at the Dinamo club in Penza.

Lavrova died in a car accident in Penza Oblast in 2010. She was a passenger in a car driven by her pregnant sister Olga Popova (Ольга Попова) who also died in the collision with another vehicle near Penza, some 600 kilometers south-east of Moscow. The car (VAZ 2114) was completely destroyed by fire after the accident. The driver of the other car was injured.

== Detailed Olympic results ==
Year	Competition Description	Location	Music	Apparatus	Score-Final	Score-Qualifying
2004	Olympics	Athens		Group All-around	51.100	49.875
2004	Olympics	Athens	Mona Lisa Overdrive music from The Matrix Reloaded by Don Davis & Juno Reactor	5 Ribbons	25.300	24.700
2004	Olympics	Athens	Ironside (excerpt) / White, Crane Lightning / "Don't Let Me Be Misunderstood" music from Kill Bill by Quincy Jones / RZA / Santa Esmeralda	3 Hoops / 2 Balls	25.800	25.175
