= Theodora Pallidou =

Greek rhythmic gymnast

- Born: 14 September 1988 (age 37)

Gymnastics career
- Discipline: Rhythmic gymnastics
- Country represented: Greece; (2003-2004 (?))

Theodora Pallidou (born 14 September 1988) is a Greek individual rhythmic gymnast. She represents her nation at international competitions.

She participated at the 2004 Summer Olympics in Athens. She also competed at world championships, including at the 2003 World Rhythmic Gymnastics Championships.
