= Olesya Belugina =

Russian gymnast and Olympic champion

- Full name: Olesya Vladimirovna Belugina
- Born: January 2, 1984 (age 42) Penza Oblast, Soviet Union
- Height: 175 cm (5 ft 9 in)

Gymnastics career
- Discipline: Rhythmic gymnastics
- Country represented: Russia
Medal record
Representing Russia
Women's Rhythmic gymnastics
Olympic Games
Gold medal – first place	2004 Athens	Group All-around
World Championships
Gold medal – first place	2005 Baku	All-Around
Gold medal – first place	2003 Budapest	All-Around
Gold medal – first place	2003 Budapest	5 Ribbons
Gold medal – first place	2003 Budapest	3 Hoops + 2 Balls
Silver medal – second place	2005 Baku	3 Hoops / 4 Clubs
Bronze medal – third place	2005 Baku	5 Ribbons
European Championships
Gold medal – first place	2001 Geneva	Group All-around
Gold medal – first place	2001 Geneva	10 Clubs
Gold medal – first place	2003 Riesa	Group All-around
Gold medal – first place	2003 Riesa	5 Ribbons
Gold medal – first place	2006 Moscow	Group All-around
Gold medal – first place	2006 Moscow	5 Ribbons
Gold medal – first place	2006 Moscow	3 Hoops + 2 Clubs

Olesya Vladimirovna Belugina (Russian: Олеся Владимировна Белугина; born January 2, 1984) is a Russian gymnast and Olympic champion. She is a two-time (2003, 2005) World Group All-around champion and a two-time (2003, 2006) European Group All-around champion.

== Career ==
She competed at the 2004 Summer Olympics in Athens where she received a gold medal in the rhythmic group competition.

== Detailed Olympic results ==
Year	Competition Description	Location	Music	Apparatus	Score-Final	Score-Qualifying
2004	Olympics	Athens		Group All-around	51.100	49.875
2004	Olympics	Athens	Mona Lisa Overdrive music from The Matrix Reloaded by Don Davis & Juno Reactor	5 Ribbons	25.300	24.700
2004	Olympics	Athens	Ironside (excerpt) / White, Crane Lightning / "Don't Let Me Be Misunderstood" music from Kill Bill by Quincy Jones / RZA / Santa Esmeralda	3 Hoops / 2 Balls	25.800	25.175
