= Hu Mei (gymnast) =

Chinese rhythmic gymnast

- Born: 9 April 1987 (age 37); Nanning, Guangxi, China
- Height: 173 cm (5 ft 8 in)

Gymnastics career
- Discipline: Rhythmic gymnastics
- Country represented: China

Hu Mei (胡美, born 9 April 1987) is a retired Chinese rhythmic gymnast. She represented China at the 2004 Summer Olympics.

Hu Mei married basketball player Zhu Fangyu, whom she met at the 2004 Summer Olympics, from 2008 to 2013. They have two children. They were divorced c. 2014.
