= Eleonora Kezhova =

Bulgarian rhythmic gymnast

- Full name: Eleоnora Valerieva Kezhova
- Born: 28 December 1985 (age 40) Sofia, Bulgaria
- Height: 1.73 m (5 ft 8 in)

Gymnastics career
- Discipline: Rhythmic gymnastics
- Country represented: Bulgaria (1992–2004)
- Club: Club Iliana Levski
- Head coach: Iliana Raeva
- Assistant coach: Ina Ananieva
- Choreographer: Tsvetanka Petkova
Medal record
Women's rhythmic gymnastics
Representing Bulgaria
Olympic Games
Bronze medal – third place	2004 Athens	Team
World Championships
Gold medal – first place	2005 Baku	5 Ribbons
Silver medal – second place	2003 Budapest	All-Around
European Championships
Gold medal – first place	2003 Riesa	3 Hoops 2 Balls
Silver medal – second place	2003 Riesa	Group All-around
Silver medal – second place	2003 Riesa	5 Ribbons
Bronze medal – third place	2001 Geneva	3 Ropes + 2 Balls

Eleоnora Valerieva Kezhova (Bulgarian: Елеонора Валериева Кежова; born 28 December 1985 in Sofia) is a retired Bulgarian rhythmic gymnast. She is a two-time member of the Bulgarian rhythmic gymnastics team at the World Championships, and contributed to a silver medal in the group all-around in 2003. The following year, at the 2004 Summer Olympics in Athens, Kezhova helped her squad claim a bronze medal in the same program.

== Career ==
=== 2000–2003 ===
Kezhova made her official worldwide debut, as a 15-year-old teen, at the 2000 Summer Olympics in Sydney, where she placed seventh for the Bulgarian squad in the group all-around tournament with a composite score of 38.432 (19.166 for five clubs and 19.266 for two hoops and three ribbons).

In 2001 she competed at the European Championships in Geneva (with teammates Galina Marinova, Gergana Stefanova, Gabriela Atanasova and Hristina Vitanova). They placed 4th in the all-around and in the 10 clubs final, and they won bronze with 3 ropes and 2 balls.

At the 2002 World Rhythmic Gymnastics Championships in New Orleans, Louisiana, United States, Kezhova and her Bulgarian team finished fourth in the same program with a score in 47.050, missing out the medal podium by 350-thousandths of a point.

The following year, at the 2003 World Rhythmic Gymnastics Championships in Budapest, Hungary, Kezhova pulled off the second highest score both in ribbons and in hoops and clubs to hand the Bulgarians a silver medal in the group all-around tournament (a score of 50.175), and a qualifying ticket to her second Olympics.

=== 2004 Summer Olympics ===
At the 2004 Summer Olympics in Athens, Kezhova Zhaneta Ilieva, Zornitsa Marinova, Kristina Rangelova, and twin sisters Galina and Vladislava Tancheva in the competition, Kezhova performed a double routine using five ribbons (23.400) and a combination of three hoops and two balls (25.200) to deliver the Bulgarian squad a bronze-medal score in 48.600.

== See also ==
- List of Olympic medalists in gymnastics (women)
