= Elena Murzina =

Russian rhythmic gymnast (born 1984)

- Full name: Elena Anatolyevna Murzina
- Born: 15 June 1984 (age 42) Sverdlovsk, Russian SFSR, Soviet Union

Gymnastics career
- Discipline: Rhythmic gymnastics
- Country represented: Russia
Medal record
Representing Russia
Women's Rhythmic gymnastics
Olympic Games
Gold medal – first place	2004 Athens	Group All-around
European Championships
Gold medal – first place	2003 Riesa	Group All-around
Gold medal – first place	2003 Riesa	5 Ribbons

Elena Anatolyevna Murzina (Russian: Елена Анатольевна Мурзина, born 15 June 1984) is a Russian rhythmic gymnast and Olympic champion.

She competed at the 2004 Summer Olympics in Athens where she received a gold medal in the rhythmic group competition.

== Detailed Olympic results ==
Year	Competition Description	Location	Music	Apparatus	Score-Final	Score-Qualifying
2004	Olympics	Athens		Group All-around	51.100	49.875
2004	Olympics	Athens	Mona Lisa Overdrive music from The Matrix Reloaded by Don Davis & Juno Reactor	5 Ribbons	25.300	24.700
2004	Olympics	Athens	Ironside (excerpt) / White, Crane Lightning / "Don't Let Me Be Misunderstood" music from Kill Bill by Quincy Jones / RZA / Santa Esmeralda	3 Hoops / 2 Balls	25.800	25.175
