= Dimosthenis Tampakos =

Greek gymnast (born 1976)

- Born: 12 November 1976 (age 49) Thessaloniki, Greece

Gymnastics career
- Discipline: Men's artistic gymnastics
- Country represented: Greece
Medal record
Olympic Games
| Gold medal – first place | 2004 Athens | Rings |
| Silver medal – second place | 2000 Sydney | Rings |
World Championships
| Gold medal – first place | 2003 Anaheim | Rings |
| Bronze medal – third place | 1999 Tianjin | Rings |
European Championships
| Gold medal – first place | 2000 Bremen | Rings |
| Gold medal – first place | 2004 Ljubljana | Rings |
| Silver medal – second place | 2002 Patras | Rings |
| Bronze medal – third place | 1998 Saint Petersburg | Rings |
European Team Championships
| Bronze medal – third place | 1999 Patras | Team |
Mediterranean Games
| Gold medal – first place | 2001 Tunis | Rings |
| Bronze medal – third place | 1997 Bari | Rings |

Dimosthenis Tampakos (Greek: Δημοσθένης Ταμπάκος, born 12 November 1976 in Thessaloniki) is a Greek gymnast and Olympic gold medalist.

He won gold in the men's rings at the 2004 Summer Olympics in Athens with a score of 9.862. He had also won the silver medal at the 2000 Summer Olympics in Sydney. In 2003 he tied for first place with Yordan Yovchev at the World Championships. He also won twice the gold medal at the European Championships in 2000 (Bremen) and in 2004 (Ljubljana).
