= Zornitsa Marinova =

Bulgarian rhythmic gymnast

- Full name: Zornitsa Marinova
- Born: 6 January 1987 (age 39) Veliko Tarnovo, Bulgaria
- Height: 1.70 m (5 ft 7 in)

Gymnastics career
- Discipline: Rhythmic gymnastics
- Country represented: Bulgaria; (1998–2008)
- Club: Club Iliana Levski
- Head coach: Adriana Dunavska
- Assistant coach: Mariela Pashalieva
- Choreographer: Stefan Stefanov
Medal record
Representing Bulgaria
Rhythmic gymnastics
Olympic Games
| Bronze medal – third place | 2004 Athens | All-Around Group |
World Championships
| Gold medal – first place | 2005 Baku | 5 Ribbons |
| Bronze medal – third place | 2007 Patras | 5 Ropes |
| Bronze medal – third place | 2007 Patras | 3 Hoops + 4 Clubs |
European Championships
| Bronze medal – third place | 2008 Torino | 5 Ropes |
| Bronze medal – third place | 2006 Moscow | 3 Hoops + 2 Clubs |

Zornitsa Marinova (Bulgarian: Зорница Маринова; born 6 January 1987 in Veliko Tarnovo) is a retired Bulgarian rhythmic gymnast. She represented Bulgaria in two editions of the Olympic Games (2004 and 2008), and also contributed to a fourth-place effort in the group all-around tournament at the 2007 World Rhythmic Gymnastics Championships in Patras, Greece. At the 2004 Summer Olympics in Athens, Marinova claimed a bronze medal in the same program as a member of the Bulgarian gymnastics squad. During her sporting career, Marinova trained for Iliana Gymnastics Club in Levski under her head coach Adriana Dunavska and her assistant coach Mariela Pashalieva.

== Career ==
=== 2004–2007 ===
Marinova made her official worldwide debut, as a 17-year-old teen, at the 2004 Summer Olympics in Athens, where she captured a bronze medal for the Bulgarian squad in the group all-around competition with a composite score of 48.600 (23.400 in the ribbon category and 25.200 in the hoops and balls), joining on top of the podium by veterans Zhaneta Ilieva, Eleonora Kezhova, Kristina Rangelova, and twin sisters Galina and Vladislava Tancheva.

At the 2007 World Rhythmic Gymnastics Championships in Patras, Greece, Marinova and her newly structured squad missed the podium by two-thousandths of a point with a fourth-place score in 33.600.

=== 2008 Summer Olympics ===
At the 2008 Summer Olympics in Beijing, Marinova competed for her second straight time in the group all-around tournament, after attaining an automatic spot in the women's rhythmic gymnastics team from the World Championships. Teaming with Tsveta Kousseva, Yolita Manolova, Maya Paunovska, Ioanna Tantcheva, and Tatyana Tongova in the competition, Marinova performed a double routine using five ropes (16.750) and a combination of three hoops and two clubs (16.800) to deliver the Bulgarian squad a fifth-place score in 33.550.

== See also ==
- List of Olympic medalists in gymnastics (women)
