= Zhaneta Ilieva =

Bulgarian rhythmic gymnast

- Full name: Zhaneta Tosheva Ilieva
- Born: 3 October 1984 (age 41) Veliko Tarnovo, Bulgaria
- Height: 1.76 m (5 ft 9 in)

Gymnastics career
- Discipline: Rhythmic gymnastics
- Country represented: Bulgaria; (1988–2004)
- Club: Club Iliana Levski
- Head coach: Tatiana Stoianova
- Assistant coach: Ina Ananieva
- Choreographer: Biser Deyanov
Medal record
Women's rhythmic gymnastics
Representing Bulgaria
Olympic Games
Bronze medal – third place	2004 Athens	Group All-around
World Championships
Silver medal – second place	2003 Budapest	Group All-around
Silver medal – second place	2003 Budapest	3 Hoops 2 Balls
Silver medal – second place	2003 Budapest	5 Ribbons
European Championships
Gold medal – first place	2003 Riesa	3 Hoops 2 Balls
Silver medal – second place	2003 Riesa	Group All-around
Silver medal – second place	2003 Riesa	5 Ribbons

Zhaneta Tosheva Ilieva (Bulgarian: Жанета Тошева Илиева; born 3 October 1984 in Veliko Tarnovo) is a retired Bulgarian rhythmic gymnast. She is a two-time member of the Bulgarian rhythmic gymnastics team at the World Championships, and contributed to a silver medal in the group all-around in 2003. The following year, at the 2004 Summer Olympics in Athens, Ilieva helped her squad claim a bronze medal in the same program before her official retirement from the sport.

== Career ==
=== 2000–2003 ===
Ilieva made her senior official debut in 1999, and later competed as part of the Bulgarian women's rhythmic gymnastics team at the 2000 Summer Olympics in Sydney, where she placed seventh in the group all-around tournament with a composite score of 38.432 (19.166 for five clubs and 19.266 for two hoops and three ribbons).

At the 2002 World Rhythmic Gymnastics Championships in New Orleans, Louisiana, United States, Ilieva and her Bulgarian team finished fourth in the same program with a score in 47.050, missing out the medal podium by 350-thousandths of a point.

The following year, at the 2003 World Rhythmic Gymnastics Championships in Budapest, Hungary, Ilieva pulled off the second highest score both in ribbons and in hoops and clubs to hand the Bulgarians a silver medal in the group all-around tournament (a score of 50.175), and a qualifying ticket to her second Olympics.

=== 2004 Summer Olympics ===
At the 2004 Summer Olympics in Athens, Ilieva competed for the Bulgarian women's rhythmic gymnastics team in the group all-around tournament, after receiving a qualifying berth from the World Championships. Teaming with Eleonora Kezhova, Zornitsa Marinova, Kristina Rangelova, and twin sisters Galina and Vladislava Tancheva in the competition, Ilieva performed a double routine using five ribbons (23.400) and a combination of three hoops and two balls (25.200) to deliver the Bulgarian squad a bronze-medal score in 48.600.

== Life after gymnastics ==
Shortly after the Olympics, Ilieva announced her retirement from rhythmic gymnastics to further pursue her degree in sports journalism at the National Sports Academy in Sofia, and later worked as a recreational and competitive team and individual coach for the Bulgarian team.

== See also ==
- List of Olympic medalists in gymnastics (women)
