= Kristina Rangelova =

Bulgarian rhythmic gymnast

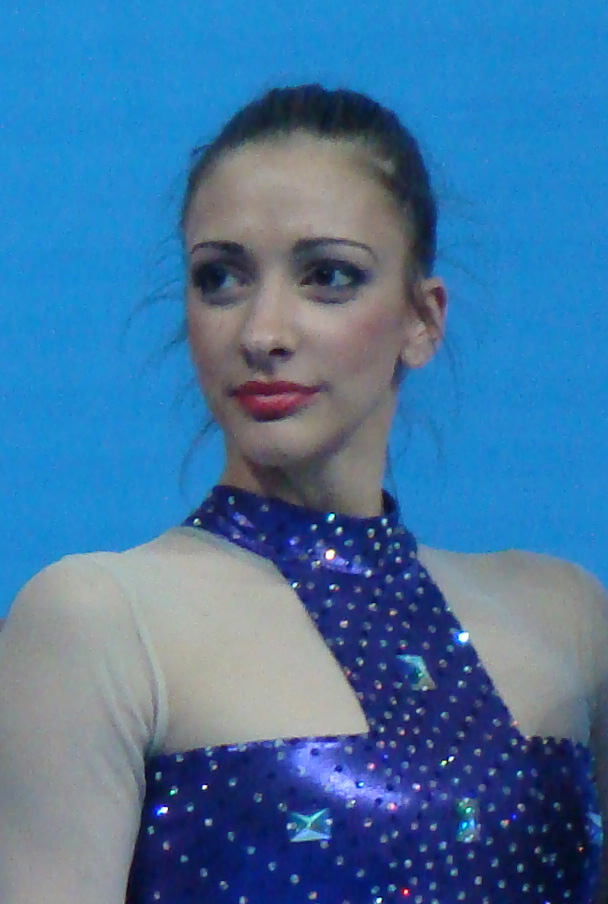

Personal information
- Full name: Kristina Rangelova-Yankova
- Born: 24 January 1985 (age 41) Sofia, Bulgaria
- Height: 1.73 m (5 ft 8 in)

Gymnastics career
- Discipline: Rhythmic gymnastics
- Country represented: Bulgaria (1999–2009)
- Club: Club Levski-Iliana
- Head coach: Iliana Raeva
- Assistant coaches: Tatiana Stoyanova, Ina Ananieva, Mariela Pashalieva
- Choreographer: Tsvetanka Petkova
- Retired: 2009
Medal record
Event	1st	2nd	3rd
Olympic Games	0	0	1
World Championships	1	3	0
European Championships	1	3	0
World Cup Final	3	5	3
Grand Prix Final	2	4	1
Total	7	15	5
Women's rhythmic gymnastics
Representing Bulgaria
Olympic Games
Bronze medal – third place	2004 Athens	Group All-around
World Championships
Gold medal – first place	2005 Baku	5 Ribbons
Silver medal – second place	2003 Budapest	Group All-around
Silver medal – second place	2003 Budapest	3 Hoops 2 Balls
Silver medal – second place	2003 Budapest	5 Ribbons
European Championships
Gold medal – first place	2003 Riesa	3 Hoops 2 Balls
Silver medal – second place	1999 Budapest	5 Ribbons
Silver medal – second place	2003 Riesa	Group All-around
Silver medal – second place	2003 Riesa	5 Ribbons

Kristina Rangelova-Yankova (Bulgarian: Кристина Рангелова; born 24 January 1985 in Sofia, Bulgaria) is a Bulgarian rhythmic gymnast. Olympic medalist 2004 Athens, World Champion 2005 Baku and Europe Champion 2003 Riesa. She has a master's degree in sports management and bachelor's degree in rhythmic gymnastics.

== Career ==
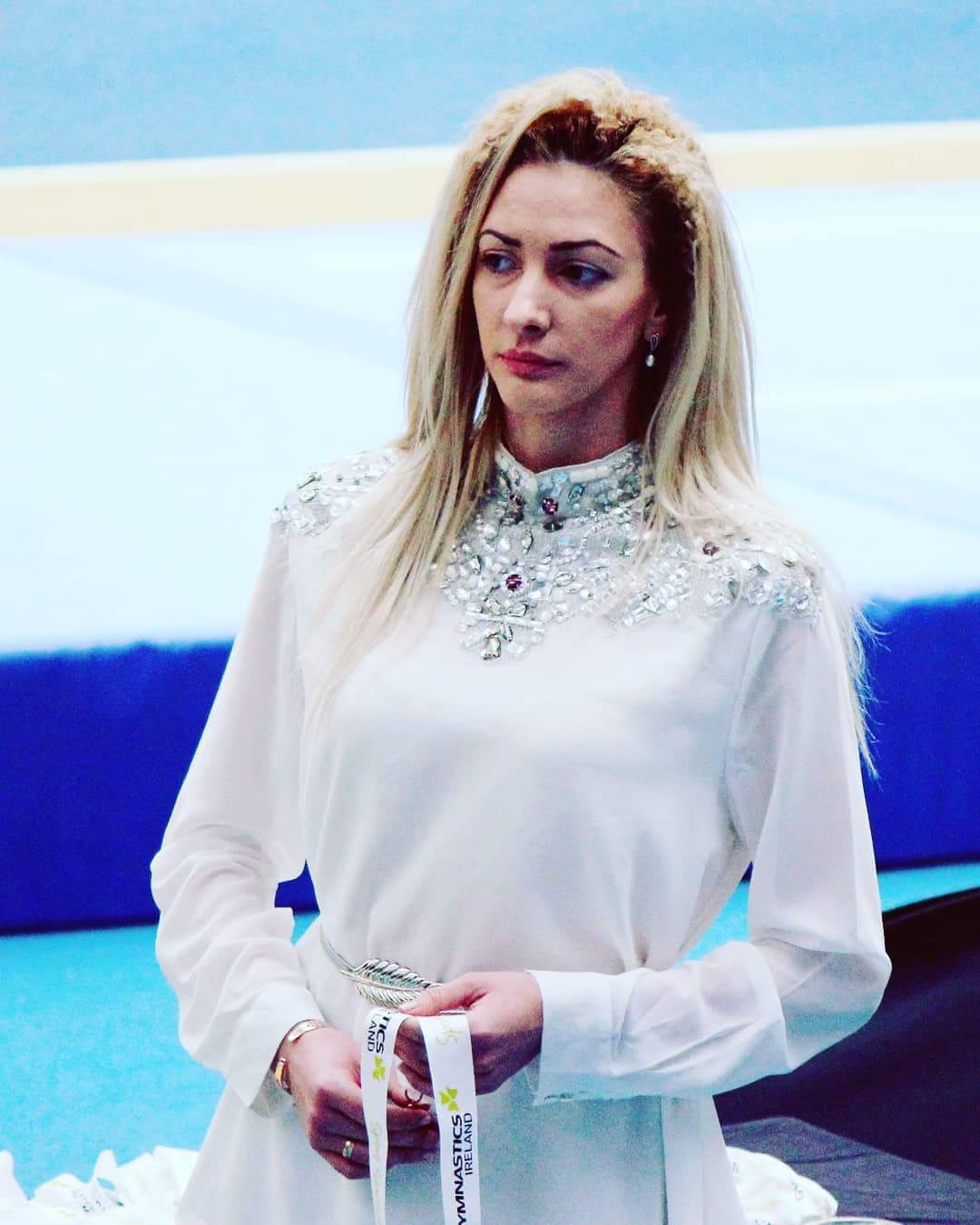

Rangelova began her training at the age of 4. As a child she dreamed of becoming a world champion and along with that collecting photos of famous gymnasts.
She is multiple champion of Bulgaria and also champion of international tournaments.

1999 European Rhythmic Gymnastics Championships in Budapest Rangelova made her official debut, as a 14-year-old, where she took the Silver medal all around with 5 Ribbons.
2000 Summer Olympics in Sydney, Australia the Bulgarian rhythmic gymnastics team took 7th place in the final group all-around with the final score of (38.432), for five clubs (19.166), for 2 hoops and 3 Ribbons (19.266).

2003 European Rhythmic Gymnastics Championships in Germany the team won a gold medal in the finals with 3 Hoops and 2 Balls, silver medal in the finals with 5 Ribbons and a silver medal in all around; this is the best result in the past 16 years for Bulgarian groups.

2003 World Rhythmic Gymnastics Championships in Budapest, Hungary, Rangelova pulled off the second highest score both in 5 Ribbons and in 3 Hoops and 2 Clubs to hand the Bulgarians a silver medal in the group all-around with the final score of (50.175), and a qualifying ticket to her second Olympics. Group results

2004 Summer Olympics in Athens, Rangelova competed for the Bulgarian women's rhythmic gymnastics team in the group all-around, after receiving a qualifying berth from the World Championships. Teaming with Zhaneta Ilieva, Eleonora Kezhova, Zornitsa Marinova, and twin sisters Galina and Vladislava Tancheva in the competition, Rangelova performed a double routine using 5 Ribbons (23.400) and a combination of 3 Hoops and 2 Balls (25.200) to deliver the Bulgarian squad a first in the history Bronze medal with a score of (48.600).

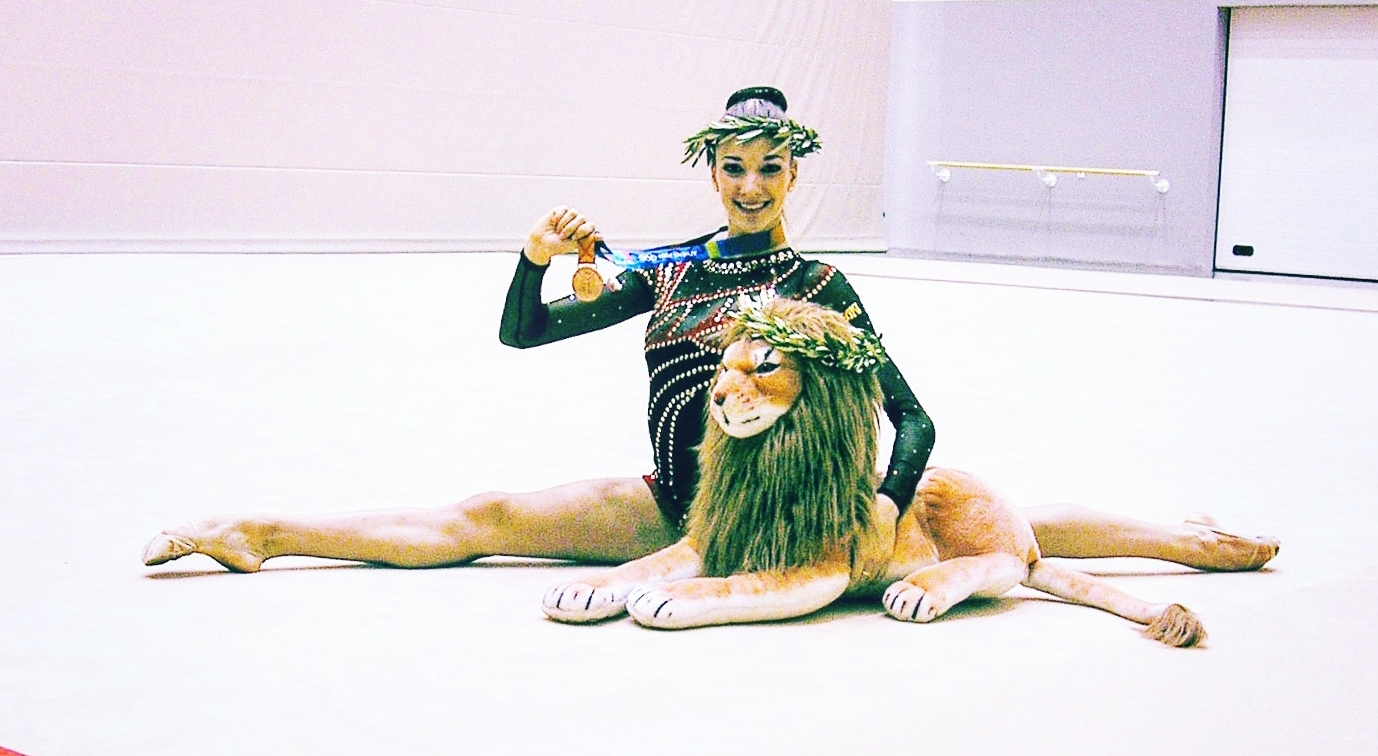
Kristina Rangelova Olympic Games Athens 2004

Kristina was the flag bearer for Bulgaria during the closing ceremony.

2005 World Championships in Baku, the Bulgarian group finished in 1st place with 5 Ribbons in the finals with a score of (14.475).

== Life after gymnastics ==
After 2005 World Championships in Baku, Rangelova was determined to continue on with her passion and sporting career, together with all girls, from her team. Rangelova began to study in National Sports Academy "Vassil Levski", where she completed a bachelor's degree in 2011 and a sports management master's degree in 2019
In 2006 Rangelova married Petar Yankov, a Bulgarian stunt performer and had a daughter, named Nikita in 2007. Seven months after she returned to the sport with all her girls from her team after two years taken some time out to compete in the World Championships. This is the first case in the history of rhythmic gymnastics, the Bulgarian team with Rangelova took 7th and 4th place in World Championships in Mie 2009, Japan. She also captured the gold medal for the Bulgarian team in the group all-around tournament at the 2009 French Grand Prix Series in Thiais.
World Cup 2009 in Kyiv, Ukraine Bronze medal,
World Cup 2009 in Pesaro, Italy Silver and bronze medals,
World Cup 2009 Portimao, Portugal Silver medal,
World Cup 2009 Budapest, Hungary Gold and Silver medals
2009 Kristina Rangelova terminated her sporting career for second and last time.
In 2010 Rangelova, gave birth to her second daughter named Dalia in Sofia.

As from 2012 Rangelova now lives in Dublin, Ireland with her family and set up her very own Elite Rhythmic Gymnastics Club in Dublin. She is currently a judge in rhythmic gymnastics and National Performance Coach

== See also ==
- List of Olympic medalists in gymnastics (women)
