= 2003 World Rhythmic Gymnastics Championships =

- Location: Budapest, Hungary
- Start date: 24 September 2003
- End date: 29 September 2003

The XXVI World Rhythmic Gymnastics Championships were held in Budapest, the capital of Hungary, during 24–29 September, 2003.

The Championships acted as a qualifying event for the 2004 Summer Olympics. At the event, the qualifying round, apparatus finals, and team event were held concurrently; after all gymnasts competed during the day, the top eight gymnasts on each apparatus competed again in the evening for apparatus finals.

At the event, a medal ceremony was held for medals from the 2001 World Championships that were reallocated as a result of Alina Kabaeva and Irina Tchachina having their results nullified due to testing positive for diuretics at the 2001 Goodwill Games. One of the recipients of the new medals, Simona Peycheva, had herself recently tested positive for diuretics in an out-of-competition test and though she was present at the event, refused to participate in the medal ceremony.

Kabaeva was allowed to return to competition in time to compete. The rivalry between Russian and Ukrainian gymnasts was exemplified by the performance of her and Anna Bessonova, a rising Ukrainian gymnast. In the early part of the competition, they split the four apparatus titles with two each, and though the Russian team won the team competition, Bessonova outperformed Kabaeva in the qualifying round, scoring 1.7 points over her. However, in the all-around final, Kabaeva competed more cleanly, with only small mistakes in her ball and club routines, while Bessonova lost the ball at the end of her first routine and finished without her apparatus, a larger mistake. Though she performed more strongly in her other routines, including receiving the highest score of the day during her hoop routine, it was not enough to overcome the point deficit. Kabaeva won the gold, Bessonova finished with the silver, and Tchachina won bronze.

Tchachina also won two of the apparatus medals, a silver with clubs and bronze with ball. Inna Zhukova also won a bronze with ball, and Elizabeth Paisieva won Bulgaria's only individual medal of the competition with a bronze in ribbon.

Russia dominated the group competition, winning all three gold medals, while Bulgaria won all three silvers. Belarus won bronze in the all-around, while the Italian group won both apparatus final medals.

== Medal winners ==
Event	Gold	Silver	Bronze
Team Competition
All-Around	Russia; Alina Kabaeva; Vera Sessina; Olga Kapranova; Irina Tchachina	Ukraine; Anna Bessonova; Tamara Yerofeeva; Natalia Godunko	Belarus; Inna Zhukova; Svetlana Rudalova; Liubov Charkashyna; Valeria Kurylskaya
Individual Finals
All-Around	Alina Kabaeva (RUS)	Anna Bessonova (UKR)	Irina Tchachina (RUS)
Hoop	Anna Bessonova (UKR)	Alina Kabaeva (RUS)	Irina Tchachina (RUS)
Ball	Alina Kabaeva (RUS)	Anna Bessonova (UKR)	Inna Zhukova (BLR)
Clubs	Anna Bessonova (UKR)	Irina Tchachina (RUS)	Alina Kabaeva (RUS)
Ribbon	Alina Kabaeva (RUS)	Anna Bessonova (UKR)	Elizabeth Paysieva (BUL)
Groups Finals
All-Around	Russia; Olesia Beluguina; Natalia Lavrova; Tatiana Kurbakova; Olessia Manurova; Elena Murzina; Elena Posevina	Bulgaria	Belarus; Ilona Osyadovskaya; Zlatislava Nersesyan etc.
5 Ribbons	Russia; Olesia Beluguina; Natalia Lavrova; Tatiana Kurbakova; Olessia Manurova; Elena Murzina; Elena Posevina	Bulgaria	Italy; Elisa Blanchi; Marinella Falca; Daniela Masseroni; Pamela Mastroianni; Francesca Pasinetti; Elisa Santoni
3 Hoops + 2 Balls	Russia; Olesia Beluguina; Natalia Lavrova; Tatiana Kurbakova; Olessia Manurova; Elena Murzina; Elena Posevina	Bulgaria	Italy; Elisa Blanchi; Marinella Falca; Daniela Masseroni; Pamela Mastroianni; Francesca Pasinetti; Elisa Santoni

== Individual Events ==
=== Individual All-Around ===
Place	Nation	Name	Total
1	Russia	Alina Kabaeva	106.475
2	Ukraine	Anna Bessonova	106.150
3	Russia	Irina Tchachina	105.775
4	Belarus	Inna Zhukova	98.825
5	Bulgaria	Elizabeth Paisieva	97.650
6	Belarus	Svetlana Rudalova	97.125
7	Kazakhstan	Aliya Yussupova	97.000
8	Azerbaijan	Dinara Gimatova	94.075
9	Greece	Eleni Andriola	93.050
10	United States	Mary Sanders	91.800
11	Spain	Jennifer Colino	91.200
12	Germany	Lisa Ingildeeva	90.475
13	Spain	Almudena Cid Tostado	90.050
14	Ukraine	Tamara Yerofeeva	89.875
15	People's Republic of China	Zhong Ling	89.500
16	Canada	Alexandra Orlando	88.700
17	Italy	Laura Zacchilli	87.450
18	Israel	Katerina Pisetsky	87.300
19	Italy	Susanna Marchesi	86.275
20	People's Republic of China	Sun Dan	85.275
21	Greece	Theodora Pallidou	85.000
22	Poland	Magdalena Markowska	84.575
23	Israel	Irina Risenzon	84.400
24	Bulgaria	Silviya Miteva	83.550
25	Czech Republic	Dominika Červenková	83.025
26	Finland	Maria Ringinen	82.825
27	Japan	Yukari Murata	82.650
28	Poland	Joanna Mitrosz	80.250
29	Mex	Cynthia Valdez	80.000
30	United Kingdom	Hannah McKibbin	79.450

=== Individual Hoop ===
Place	Nation	Name	Result
1	Ukraine	Anna Bessonova	26.375
2	Russia	Alina Kabaeva	25.900
3	Russia	Irina Tchachina	25.200
4	Kazakhstan	Aliya Yusupova	24.250
5	Bulgaria	Elizabeth Paysieva	24.200
6	Belarus	Inna Zhukova	24.050
7	United States	Mary Sanders	23.475
8	Greece	Stergiani Pantazi	23.325

=== Individual Ball ===
Place	Nation	Name	Result
1	Russia	Alina Kabaeva	26.675
2	Ukraine	Anna Bessonova	26.550
3	Belarus	Inna Zhukova	25.875
4	Ukraine	Tamara Yerofeeva	25.700
5	Russia	Irina Tchachina	25.625
6	Kazakhstan	Aliya Yusupova	25.325
7	Greece	Eleni Andriola	23.675
8	Azerbaijan	Dinara Gimatova	23.525

=== Individual Clubs ===
Place	Nation	Name	Result
1	Ukraine	Anna Bessonova	27.225
2	Russia	Irina Tchachina	27.000
3	Russia	Alina Kabaeva	26.475
4	Belarus	Inna Zhukova	25.550
5	Kazakhstan	Aliya Yusupova	24.725
6	Greece	Eleni Andriola	23.950
7	United States	Mary Sanders	23.775
8	Spain	Almudena Cid Tostado	23.650

=== Individual Ribbon ===
Place	Nation	Name	Result
1	Russia	Alina Kabaeva	26.525
2	Ukraine	Anna Bessonova	26.375
3	Bulgaria	Elizabeth Paysieva	24.225
4	Russia	Irina Tchachina	23.825
5	Belarus	Inna Zhukova	23.725
6	Belarus	Svetlana Rudalova	22.800
7	Greece	Eleni Andriola	22.000
8	Italy	Laura Zacchilli	21.600

== Groups Finals ==
=== Groups All-Around ===
Place	Nation	Result
1	Russia	50.325
2	Bulgaria	50.175
3	Belarus	46.450
4	Italy	46.450
5	Ukraine	45.625
6	Spain	45.150
7	China	44.150
8	Greece	42.675
9	Brazil	41.800
10	Poland	40.675
11	Hungary	40.250
12	Canada	39.350
13	Germany	39.150
14	France	39.025
15	Switzerland	37.950
16	Japan	35.100
17	Austria	34.875
18	South Korea	32.575
19	Lithuania	32.075
20	Finland	31.750
21	Estonia	31.000
22	Slovakia	30.700
23	Chile	24.675

=== Groups 5 Ribbons ===
Place	Nation	Result
1	Russia	25.200
2	Bulgaria	24.950
3	Italy	23.550
4	China	22.950
5	Belarus	22.650
6	Spain	22.250
7	Greece	21.500
8	Ukraine	20.800

=== Groups 3 Hoops + 2 Balls ===
Place	Nation	Result
1	Russia	25.275
2	Bulgaria	25.200
3	Italy	24.700
4	Ukraine	23.500
5	Belarus	23.375
6	Greece	21.975
7	Spain	21.800
8	Poland	20.200

== Medal table ==
Rank	Nation	Gold	Silver	Bronze	Total
1	Russia	7	2	3	12
2	Ukraine	2	4	0	6
3	Bulgaria	0	3	1	4
4	Belarus	0	0	3	3
5	Italy	0	0	2	2
Totals (5 entries)		9	9	9	27
