= List of gymnasts at the 2008 Summer Olympics =

This is a list of the gymnasts who represented their country at the 2008 Summer Olympics in Beijing from 8–24 August 2008. Gymnasts across three disciplines (artistic gymnastics, rhythmic gymnastics, and trampoline) participated in the Games.

== Women's artistic gymnastics ==
	Name	Country	Date of birth (Age)
Youngest competitor	Jo Hyun-joo	South Korea	13 December 1992 (aged 15)
Oldest competitor	Oksana Chusovitina	Germany	19 June 1975 (aged 33)

NOC	Name	Birth date	Hometown
Australia	Georgia Bonora	19 May 1990 (aged 18)	Fitzroy, Australia
Australia	Ashleigh Brennan	18 January 1991 (aged 17)	Melbourne, Australia
Australia	Daria Joura	2 May 1990 (aged 18)	Leninsk-Kuznetsky, Russia
Australia	Lauren Mitchell	23 July 1991 (aged 17)	Subiaco, Australia
Australia	Shona Morgan	1 September 1990 (aged 17)	Mount Waverley, Australia
Australia	Olivia Vivian	13 July 1989 (aged 19)	Perth, Australia
Belarus	Nastassia Marachkouskaya	19 September 1990 (aged 17)	Minsk, Belarus
Belgium	Gaelle Mys	16 November 1991 (aged 16)	Ghent, Belgium
Brazil	Jade Barbosa	1 July 1991 (aged 17)	Rio de Janeiro, Brazil
Brazil	Daiane dos Santos	10 February 1983 (aged 25)	Porto Alegre, Brazil
Brazil	Ethiene Franco	27 April 1992 (aged 16)	Curitiba, Brazil
Brazil	Daniele Hypólito	8 September 1984 (aged 23)	Santo André, Brazil
Brazil	Ana Cláudia Silva	28 April 1992 (aged 16)	Natal, Brazil
Brazil	Laís Souza	13 December 1988 (aged 19)	Ribeirão Preto, Brazil
Bulgaria	Nikolina Tankoucheva	5 February 1986 (aged 22)	Sofia, Bulgaria
Canada	Nansy Damianova	30 March 1991 (aged 17)	Montreal, Quebec
Canada	Elyse Hopfner-Hibbs	12 September 1989 (aged 18)	Mississauga, Ontario
China	Cheng Fei	29 May 1988 (aged 20)	Huangshi, China
China	Deng Linlin	21 April 1992 (aged 16)	Fuyang, China
China	He Kexin	1 January 1992 (aged 16)	Beijing, China
China	Jiang Yuyuan	1 November 1991 (aged 16)	Liuzhou, China
China	Li Shanshan	22 February 1992 (aged 16)	Huangshi, China
China	Yang Yilin	26 August 1992 (aged 15)	Guangzhou, China
Colombia	Nathalia Sánchez	7 June 1992 (aged 16)	Villavicencio, Colombia
Croatia	Tina Erceg	3 May 1988 (aged 20)	Split, Croatia
Czech Republic	Kristýna Pálešová	22 February 1991 (aged 17)	Ivančice, Czech Republic
Egypt	Sherine El-Zeiny	23 February 1991 (aged 17)	Amsterdam, Netherlands
France	Rose-Eliandre Bellemare	20 August 1989 (aged 18)	Montpellier, France
France	Marine Debauve	3 September 1988 (aged 19)	Dijon, France
France	Laetitia Dugain	27 November 1992 (aged 15)	Annecy, France
France	Katheleen Lindor	30 August 1989 (aged 18)	Aubergenville, France
France	Pauline Morel	3 January 1992 (aged 16)	Chenôve, France
France	Marine Petit	15 November 1992 (aged 15)	Saint-Vallier, France
Germany	Katja Abel	8 April 1983 (aged 25)	Berlin, Germany
Germany	Daria Bijak	12 November 1985 (aged 22)	Racibórz, Poland
Germany	Anja Brinker	18 January 1991 (aged 17)	Melle, Germany
Germany	Oksana Chusovitina	19 June 1975 (aged 33)	Bukhara, Uzbekistan
Germany	Marie-Sophie Hindermann	26 May 1991 (aged 17)	Tübingen, Germany
Germany	Joeline Möbius	26 August 1992 (aged 15)	Chemnitz, Germany
Great Britain	Imogen Cairns	26 January 1989 (aged 19)	Bristol, England
Great Britain	Becky Downie	24 January 1992 (aged 16)	Nottingham, England
Great Britain	Marissa King	20 April 1991 (aged 17)	Cambridge, England
Great Britain	Beth Tweddle	1 April 1985 (aged 23)	Bunbury, England
Great Britain	Hannah Whelan	1 July 1992 (aged 16)	Stockport, England
Great Britain	Rebecca Wing	15 July 1992 (aged 16)	Farnborough, England
Greece	Stefani Bismpikou	27 June 1988 (aged 20)	Athens, Greece
Hungary	Dorina Böczögő	15 February 1992 (aged 16)	Orosháza, Hungary
Italy	Francesca Benolli	26 August 1989 (aged 18)	Trieste, Italy
Italy	Monica Bergamelli	24 May 1984 (aged 24)	Alzano Lombardo, Italy
Italy	Vanessa Ferrari	10 November 1990 (aged 17)	Genivolta, Italy
Italy	Carlotta Giovannini	5 July 1990 (aged 18)	Castel San Pietro Terme, Italy
Italy	Federica Macrì	22 August 1990 (aged 17)	Trieste, Italy
Italy	Lia Parolari	30 July 1990 (aged 18)	Orzinuovi, Italy
Japan	Mayu Kuroda	20 February 1989 (aged 19)	Aichi, Japan
Japan	Yu Minobe	23 February 1990 (aged 18)	Komatsu, Japan
Japan	Kyoko Oshima	5 August 1986 (aged 22)	Tokyo, Japan
Japan	Yuko Shintake	20 April 1991 (aged 17)	Osaka, Japan
Japan	Kōko Tsurumi	28 September 1992 (aged 15)	Saitama, Japan
Japan	Miki Uemura	6 March 1986 (aged 22)	Arida, Japan
Lithuania	Jelena Zanevskaja	2 April 1987 (aged 21)	Vilnius, Lithuania
Mexico	Marisela Cantú	25 October 1990 (aged 17)	Monterrey, Mexico
Netherlands	Suzanne Harmes	10 January 1986 (aged 22)	Zoetermeer, Netherlands
North Korea	Cha Yong-hwa	8 January 1990 (aged 18)	Pyongyang, North Korea
North Korea	Hong Un-jong	9 March 1989 (aged 19)	Hamhung, North Korea
Poland	Marta Pihan	23 July 1987 (aged 21)	Szczecin, Poland
Romania	Andreea Acatrinei	7 April 1992 (aged 16)	Brașov, Romania
Romania	Gabriela Drăgoi	28 August 1992 (aged 15)	Buzău, Romania
Romania	Andreea Grigore	11 April 1991 (aged 17)	Bucharest, Romania
Romania	Sandra Izbașa	18 June 1990 (aged 18)	Bucharest, Romania
Romania	Steliana Nistor	15 September 1989 (aged 18)	Sibiu, Romania
Romania	Anamaria Tămârjan	8 May 1991 (aged 17)	Constanța, Romania
Russia	Ksenia Afanasyeva	13 September 1991 (aged 16)	Tula, Russia
Russia	Ludmila Grebenkova	4 March 1982 (aged 26)	Moscow, Russia
Russia	Svetlana Klyukina	10 February 1989 (aged 19)	Severodvinsk, Russia
Russia	Ekaterina Kramarenko	22 April 1991 (aged 17)	Saint Petersburg, Russia
Russia	Anna Pavlova	6 September 1987 (aged 20)	Orekhovo-Zuyevo, Russia
Russia	Ksenia Semyonova	20 October 1992 (aged 15)	Novomoskovsk, Russia
Slovakia	Ivana Kováčová	24 February 1992 (aged 16)	Bratislava, Slovakia
Slovenia	Adela Šajn	14 April 1990 (aged 18)	Ljubljana, Slovenia
South Korea	Jo Hyun-joo	13 December 1992 (aged 15)	Seoul, South Korea
Spain	Laura Campos	13 September 1988 (aged 19)	Mérida, Spain
Spain	Lenika de Simone	29 August 1988 (aged 19)	Hollywood, Florida
Switzerland	Ariella Käslin	11 October 1987 (aged 20)	Lucerne, Switzerland
Ukraine	Valentyna Holenkova	7 May 1992 (aged 16)	Kropyvnytskyi, Ukraine
Ukraine	Anastasia Koval	6 November 1992 (aged 15)	Kyiv, Ukraine
Ukraine	Alina Kozich	16 December 1987 (aged 20)	Kyiv, Ukraine
Ukraine	Iryna Krasnianska	19 November 1987 (aged 20)	Vologda, Russia
Ukraine	Maryna Proskurina	12 August 1985 (aged 22)	Kharkiv, Ukraine
Ukraine	Dariya Zgoba	7 November 1989 (aged 18)	Ivano-Frankivsk, Ukraine
United States	Shawn Johnson	19 January 1992 (aged 16)	West Des Moines, Iowa
United States	Nastia Liukin	30 October 1989 (aged 18)	Plano, Texas
United States	Chellsie Memmel	23 June 1988 (aged 20)	West Allis, Wisconsin
United States	Samantha Peszek	14 December 1991 (aged 16)	McCordsville, Indiana
United States	Alicia Sacramone	3 December 1987 (aged 20)	Winchester, Massachusetts
United States	Bridget Sloan	23 June 1992 (aged 16)	Cincinnati, Ohio
Uzbekistan	Luiza Galiulina	23 June 1992 (aged 16)	Tashkent, Uzbekistan
Venezuela	Jessica López	22 January 1986 (aged 22)	Caracas, Venezuela
Vietnam	Đỗ Thị Ngân Thương (Note: On August 15, 2008, the International Olympic Committee announced that Thương had tested positive for the banned substance furosemide. She was disqualified from the competition and her score was nullified.)	10 March 1989 (aged 19)	Hanoi, Vietnam

== Men's artistic gymnastics ==
	Name	Country	Date of birth (Age)
Youngest competitor	Dan Keatings	United Kingdom	4 January 1990 (aged 18)
Oldest competitor	Yordan Yovchev	Bulgaria	24 February 1973 (aged 35)

NOC	Name	Date of birth (Age)	Hometown
Australia	Sam Simpson	24 April 1984 (aged 24)	Brisbane, Australia
Belarus	Aleksei Ignatovich	12 May 1986 (aged 22)	Minsk, Belarus
Belarus	Dmitry Kasperovich	15 October 1977 (aged 30)	Minsk, Belarus
Belarus	Igor Kozlov	14 June 1987 (aged 21)	Brest, Belarus
Belarus	Denis Savenkov	17 September 1983 (aged 24)	Gomel, Belarus
Belarus	Dmitry Savitski	22 February 1984 (aged 24)	Gomel, Belarus
Belarus	Aleksandr Tsarevich	13 December 1986 (aged 21)	Minsk, Belarus
Belgium	Koen van Damme	29 April 1987 (aged 21)	Sint-Niklaas, Belgium
Brazil	Diego Hypólito	19 June 1986 (aged 22)	Santo André, Brazil
Bulgaria	Yordan Yovchev	24 February 1973 (aged 35)	Plovdiv, Bulgaria
Canada	Nathan Gafuik	12 June 1985 (aged 23)	Calgary, Alberta
Canada	Grant Golding	30 March 1981 (aged 27)	Calgary, Alberta
Canada	David Kikuchi	27 December 1979 (aged 28)	Truro, Nova Scotia
Canada	Brandon O'Neill	21 December 1984 (aged 23)	Edmonton, Alberta
Canada	Kyle Shewfelt	6 May 1982 (aged 26)	Calgary, Alberta
Canada	Adam Wong	29 March 1985 (aged 23)	Calgary, Alberta
China	Chen Yibing	19 December 1984 (aged 23)	Tianjin, China
China	Huang Xu	4 February 1979 (aged 29)	Nantong, China
China	Li Xiaopeng	27 July 1981 (aged 27)	Changsha, China
China	Xiao Qin	12 January 1985 (aged 23)	Nanjing, China
China	Yang Wei	8 February 1980 (aged 28)	Xiantao, China
China	Zou Kai	25 February 1988 (aged 20)	Luzhou, China
Colombia	Jorge Hugo Giraldo	5 September 1979 (aged 28)	Medellín, Colombia
Croatia	Filip Ude	3 June 1986 (aged 22)	Čakovec, Croatia
Czech Republic	Martin Konečný	6 August 1984 (aged 24)	Prague, Czech Republic
Egypt	Mohamed Srour	18 January 1986 (aged 22)	Cairo, Egypt
France	Thomas Bouhail	3 July 1986 (aged 22)	Montfermeil, France
France	Benoît Caranobe	12 June 1980 (aged 28)	Vitry-sur-Seine, France
France	Yann Cucherat	2 October 1979 (aged 28)	Lyon, France
France	Dimitri Karbanenko	19 July 1973 (aged 35)	Kaliningrad, Russia
France	Danny Pinheiro Rodrigues	16 April 1985 (aged 23)	Rouen, France
France	Hamilton Sabot	31 May 1987 (aged 21)	Cagnes-sur-Mer, France
Georgia	Ilia Giorgadze	12 January 1978 (aged 30)	Kutaisi, Georgia
Germany	Thomas Andergassen	20 February 1980 (aged 28)	Lindau, Germany
Germany	Philipp Boy	23 July 1987 (aged 21)	Schwedt, Germany
Germany	Fabian Hambüchen	25 October 1987 (aged 20)	Wetzlar, Germany
Germany	Robert Juckel	12 December 1981 (aged 26)	Cottbus, Germany
Germany	Marcel Nguyen	8 September 1987 (aged 20)	Munich, Germany
Germany	Evgenij Spiridonov	2 April 1982 (aged 26)	Chelyabinsk, Russia
Great Britain	Dan Keatings	4 January 1990 (aged 18)	Kettering, England
Great Britain	Louis Smith	22 April 1989 (aged 19)	Peterborough, England
Greece	Vlasios Maras	31 March 1983 (aged 25)	Athens, Greece
Hungary	Róbert Gál	30 March 1979 (aged 29)	Budapest, Hungary
Israel	Alexander Shatilov	22 March 1987 (aged 21)	Tashkent, Uzbekistan
Italy	Matteo Angioletti	8 November 1980 (aged 27)	Monza, Italy
Italy	Alberto Busnari	4 October 1978 (aged 29)	Melzo, Italy
Italy	Igor Cassina	15 August 1977 (aged 30)	Seregno, Italy
Italy	Andrea Coppolino	19 August 1979 (aged 28)	Novedrate, Italy
Italy	Matteo Morandi	8 October 1981 (aged 26)	Vimercate, Italy
Italy	Enrico Pozzo	12 February 1981 (aged 27)	Biella, Italy
Japan	Takehiro Kashima	16 July 1980 (aged 28)	Osaka, Japan
Japan	Takuya Nakase	19 November 1982 (aged 25)	Ōtsu, Japan
Japan	Makoto Okiguchi	22 November 1985 (aged 22)	Osaka, Japan
Japan	Koki Sakamoto	21 August 1986 (aged 21)	Sapporo, Japan
Japan	Hiroyuki Tomita	21 November 1980 (aged 27)	Osaka, Japan
Japan	Kōhei Uchimura	3 January 1989 (aged 19)	Isahaya, Japan
Luxembourg	Sascha Palgen	15 August 1984 (aged 23)	Esch-sur-Alzette, Luxembourg
Netherlands	Epke Zonderland	16 April 1986 (aged 22)	Lemmer, Netherlands
Poland	Leszek Blanik	1 March 1977 (aged 31)	Wodzisław Śląski, Poland
Puerto Rico	Luis Rivera	4 September 1986 (aged 21)	Humacao, Puerto Rico
Romania	Adrian Bucur	26 April 1985 (aged 23)	Târgu Mureș, Romania
Romania	Marian Drăgulescu	18 December 1980 (aged 27)	Bucharest, Romania
Romania	Flavius Koczi	26 August 1987 (aged 20)	Reșița, Romania
Romania	Ilie Daniel Popescu	1 June 1983 (aged 25)	Reșița, Romania
Romania	Răzvan Șelariu	2 November 1983 (aged 24)	Reșița, Romania
Romania	Robert Stănescu	17 January 1985 (aged 23)	Bucharest, Romania
Russia	Maksim Devyatovskiy	22 April 1984 (aged 24)	Leninsk-Kuznetsky, Russia
Russia	Anton Golotsutskov	28 July 1985 (aged 23)	Seversk, Russia
Russia	Sergey Khorokhordin	9 November 1985 (aged 22)	Barnaul, Russia
Russia	Nikolai Kryukov	11 November 1978 (aged 29)	Voronezh, Russia
Russia	Konstantin Pluzhnikov	28 April 1987 (aged 21)	Seversk, Russia
Russia	Yuri Ryazanov	21 March 1987 (aged 21)	Vladimir, Russia
Slovenia	Mitja Petkovšek	6 February 1977 (aged 31)	Ljubljana, Slovenia
South Korea	Kim Dae-eun	17 September 1984 (aged 23)	Yeonggwang, South Korea
South Korea	Kim Ji-hoon	9 August 1984 (aged 23)	Seoul, South Korea
South Korea	Kim Seung-il	9 May 1985 (aged 23)	Seoul, South Korea
South Korea	Kim Soo-myun	4 November 1986 (aged 21)	Pohang, South Korea
South Korea	Yang Tae-young	8 July 1980 (aged 28)	Seoul, South Korea
South Korea	Yoo Won-chul	20 July 1984 (aged 24)	Masan, South Korea
Spain	Isaac Botella	12 June 1984 (aged 24)	Elche, Spain
Spain	Manuel Carballo	23 November 1982 (aged 25)	Madrid, Spain
Spain	Gervasio Deferr	7 November 1980 (aged 27)	Premià de Mar, Spain
Spain	Rafael Martínez	10 December 1983 (aged 24)	Madrid, Spain
Spain	Sergio Muñoz	30 August 1989 (aged 18)	Soria, Spain
Spain	Ivan San Miguel	12 January 1985 (aged 23)	Villamayor, Spain
Switzerland	Claudio Capelli	16 November 1986 (aged 21)	Bern, Switzerland
Switzerland	Christoph Schärer	14 August 1980 (aged 27)	Oberdiessbach, Switzerland
Ukraine	Valeriy Honcharov	19 September 1977 (aged 30)	Kharkiv, Ukraine
Ukraine	Oleksandr Vorobiov	5 October 1984 (aged 23)	Kamianske, Ukraine
United States	Alexander Artemev	29 August 1985 (aged 22)	Minsk, Belarus
United States	Raj Bhavsar	7 September 1980 (aged 27)	Houston, Texas
United States	Joseph Hagerty	19 April 1982 (aged 26)	Albuquerque, New Mexico
United States	Jonathan Horton	31 December 1985 (aged 22)	Houston, Texas
United States	Justin Spring	11 March 1984 (aged 24)	Burke, Virginia
United States	Kevin Tan	24 September 1981 (aged 26)	Fremont, California
Uzbekistan	Anton Fokin	13 November 1982 (aged 25)	Tashkent, Uzbekistan
Venezuela	José Luis Fuentes	2 March 1985 (aged 23)	Valencia, Venezuela
Yemen	Nashwan Al-Harazi	29 November 1986 (aged 21)	Sanaa, Yemen

== Rhythmic gymnasts ==
=== Individual ===
	Name	Country	Date of birth (Age)
Youngest competitor	Neta Rivkin	Israel	19 June 1991 (aged 17)
Oldest competitor	Almudena Cid	Spain	15 June 1980 (aged 28)

NOC	Name	Date of birth (Age)	Hometown
Australia	Naazmi Johnston	28 November 1988 (aged 19)	Sydney, Australia
Austria	Caroline Weber	31 May 1986 (aged 22)	Dornbirn, Austria
Azerbaijan	Aliya Garayeva	1 January 1988 (aged 20)	Yekaterinburg, Russia
Azerbaijan	Dinara Gimatova	18 November 1986 (aged 21)	Astrakhan, Russia
Belarus	Liubov Charkashyna	23 December 1987 (aged 20)	Brest, Belarus
Belarus	Inna Zhukova	6 September 1986 (aged 21)	Krasnodar, Russia
Bulgaria	Elizabeth Paisieva	17 December 1986 (aged 21)	Sofia, Bulgaria
Bulgaria	Simona Peycheva	14 May 1985 (aged 23)	Sofia, Bulgaria
Canada	Alexandra Orlando	19 January 1987 (aged 21)	Toronto, Ontario
Cape Verde	Wania Monteiro	9 August 1986 (aged 21)	Santa Catarina, Cape Verde
China	Li Hongyang	16 May 1990 (aged 18)	Guilin, China
Estonia	Irina Kikkas	22 July 1984 (aged 24)	Tallinn, Estonia
Greece	Eleni Andriola	9 November 1986 (aged 21)	Athens, Greece
Israel	Irina Risenzon	14 January 1988 (aged 20)	Budapest, Hungary
Israel	Neta Rivkin	19 June 1991 (aged 17)	Petah Tikva, Israel
Kazakhstan	Aliya Yussupova	15 May 1984 (aged 24)	Shymkent, Kazakhstan
Poland	Joanna Mitrosz	21 August 1988 (aged 19)	Gdynia, Poland
Russia	Evgeniya Kanaeva	2 April 1990 (aged 18)	Omsk, Russia
Russia	Olga Kapranova	6 December 1987 (aged 20)	Moscow, Russia
South Africa	Odette Richard	18 July 1988 (aged 20)	Johannesburg, South Africa
South Korea	Shin Soo-ji	8 January 1991 (aged 17)	Seoul, South Korea
Spain	Almudena Cid	15 June 1980 (aged 28)	Vitoria-Gasteiz, Spain
Ukraine	Anna Bessonova	29 July 1984 (aged 24)	Kyiv, Ukraine
Ukraine	Natalia Godunko	5 December 1984 (aged 23)	Kyiv, Ukraine

=== Group ===
	Name	Country	Date of birth (Age)
Youngest competitor	Vasiliki Maniou	Greece	25 November 1992 (aged 15)
Oldest competitor	Lü Yuanyang	China	22 June 1983 (aged 25)

NOC	Name	Date of birth (Age)	Hometown
Azerbaijan	Anna Bitieva	17 November 1987 (aged 20)	Tskhinvali, Georgia
Azerbaijan	Dina Gorina	1 November 1987 (aged 20)	Baku, Azerbaijan
Azerbaijan	Vafa Huseynova	10 November 1988 (aged 19)	Baku, Azerbaijan
Azerbaijan	Anastasiya Prasolova	19 October 1989 (aged 18)	Baku, Azerbaijan
Azerbaijan	Alina Trepina	16 September 1989 (aged 18)	Baku, Azerbaijan
Azerbaijan	Valeriya Yegay	13 December 1986 (aged 21)	Baku, Azerbaijan
Belarus	Olesya Babushkina	30 January 1989 (aged 19)	Gomel, Belarus
Belarus	Anastasia Ivankova	22 November 1991 (aged 16)	Minsk, Belarus
Belarus	Zinaida Lunina	18 April 1989 (aged 19)	Minsk, Belarus
Belarus	Glafira Martinovich	4 February 1989 (aged 19)	Minsk, Belarus
Belarus	Ksenia Sankovich	27 July 1990 (aged 18)	Minsk, Belarus
Belarus	Alina Tumilovich	21 April 1990 (aged 18)	Minsk, Belarus
Brazil	Luana Faro	24 March 1990 (aged 18)	Belém, Brazil
Brazil	Daniela Leite	20 April 1988 (aged 20)	Belo Horizonte, Brazil
Brazil	Tayanne Mantovaneli	14 February 1987 (aged 21)	São Paulo, Brazil
Brazil	Luisa Matsuo	8 August 1988 (aged 20)	Florianópolis, Brazil
Brazil	Marcela Menezes	8 June 1986 (aged 22)	Salvador, Brazil
Brazil	Nicole Muller	27 February 1989 (aged 19)	Toledo, Brazil
Bulgaria	Tzveta Kousseva	6 January 1989 (aged 19)	Sofia, Bulgaria
Bulgaria	Yolita Manolova	5 October 1989 (aged 18)	Sofia, Bulgaria
Bulgaria	Zornitsa Marinova	6 January 1987 (aged 21)	Veliko Tarnovo, Bulgaria
Bulgaria	Maya Paunovska	5 May 1988 (aged 20)	Mezdra, Bulgaria
Bulgaria	Ioanna Tantcheva	18 March 1989 (aged 19)	Sofia, Bulgaria
Bulgaria	Tatiana Tongova	14 October 1989 (aged 18)	Sofia, Bulgaria
China	Cai Tongtong	7 February 1990 (aged 18)	Wenzhou, China
China	Chou Tao	30 March 1988 (aged 20)	Dalian, China
China	Lü Yuanyang	22 June 1983 (aged 25)	Sichuan, China
China	Sui Jianshuang	1 February 1989 (aged 19)	Shenyang, China
China	Sun Dan	4 April 1986 (aged 22)	Liaoning, China
China	Zhang Shuo	5 January 1984 (aged 24)	Liaoning, China
Greece	Dimitra Kafalidou	20 August 1991 (aged 16)	Athens, Greece
Greece	Vasiliki Maniou	25 November 1992 (aged 15)	Athens, Greece
Greece	Olga-Afroditi Pilaki	12 January 1989 (aged 19)	Albania
Greece	Paraskevi Plexida	26 June 1991 (aged 17)	Athens, Greece
Greece	Ioanna Samara	29 August 1991 (aged 16)	Thessaloniki, Greece
Greece	Nikoletta Tsagari	14 July 1990 (aged 18)	Athens, Greece
Israel	Olena Dvornichenko	3 November 1990 (aged 17)	Ukraine
Israel	Katerina Pisetsky	26 February 1986 (aged 22)	Zaporizhzhia, Ukraine
Israel	Maria Savenkov	2 August 1988 (aged 20)	Volgograd, Russia
Israel	Rahel Vigdozchik	1 May 1989 (aged 19)	Holon, Israel
Israel	Veronika Vitenberg	9 September 1988 (aged 19)	Grodno, Belarus
Italy	Elisa Blanchi	13 October 1987 (aged 20)	Velletri, Italy
Italy	Fabrizia D'Ottavio	3 February 1985 (aged 23)	Chieti, Italy
Italy	Marinella Falca	1 May 1986 (aged 22)	Giovinazzo, Italy
Italy	Daniela Masseroni	28 February 1985 (aged 23)	Trescore Balneario, Italy
Italy	Elisa Santoni	10 December 1987 (aged 20)	Rome, Italy
Italy	Anzhelika Savrayuk	23 August 1989 (aged 18)	Lutsk, Ukraine
Japan	Yuka Endo	30 September 1991 (aged 16)	Niigata, Japan
Japan	Chihana Hara	13 April 1989 (aged 19)	Iruma, Japan
Japan	Saori Inagaki	19 February 1990 (aged 18)	Chiba, Japan
Japan	Nachi Misawa	13 November 1989 (aged 18)	Yamagata, Japan
Japan	Kotono Tanaka	18 August 1991 (aged 16)	Beppu, Japan
Japan	Honami Tsuboi	5 April 1989 (aged 19)	Gifu, Japan
Russia	Margarita Aliychuk	10 August 1990 (aged 17)	Seversk, Russia
Russia	Anna Gavrilenko	10 July 1990 (aged 18)	Yekaterinburg, Russia
Russia	Tatiana Gorbunova	23 January 1990 (aged 18)	Naberezhnye Chelny, Russia
Russia	Yelena Posevina	13 February 1986 (aged 22)	Tula, Russia
Russia	Daria Shkurikhina	3 October 1990 (aged 17)	Kazan, Russia
Russia	Natalia Zuyeva	10 October 1988 (aged 19)	Belgorod, Russia
Spain	Bárbara González	15 January 1985 (aged 23)	Pamplona, Spain
Spain	Lara González	14 April 1986 (aged 22)	Pamplona, Spain
Spain	Isabel Pagán	24 July 1986 (aged 22)	Orihuela, Spain
Spain	Ana María Pelaz	24 September 1987 (aged 20)	Laguna de Duero, Spain
Spain	Verónica Ruíz	23 January 1989 (aged 19)	Huelva, Spain
Spain	Elisabeth Salom	20 January 1989 (aged 19)	Mahón, Menorca
Ukraine	Krystyna Cherepenina	21 November 1991 (aged 16)	Luhansk, Ukraine
Ukraine	Olena Dmytrash	1 December 1991 (aged 16)	Bila Tserkva, Ukraine
Ukraine	Alina Maksymenko	10 July 1991 (aged 17)	Zaporizhzhia, Ukraine
Ukraine	Viera Perederiy	28 February 1990 (aged 18)	Lviv, Ukraine
Ukraine	Iuliia Slobodyan	25 September 1992 (aged 15)	Lviv, Ukraine
Ukraine	Vita Zubchenko	4 March 1989 (aged 19)	Bila Tserkva, Ukraine

== Male trampoline gymnasts ==
	Name	Country	Date of birth (Age)
Youngest competitor	Diogo Ganchinho	Portugal	12 September 1989 (aged 18)
Oldest competitor	Mikalai Kazak	Belarus	8 September 1977 (aged 30)

NOC	Name	Date of birth (Age)	Hometown
Australia	Ben Wilden	24 April 1985 (aged 23)	Murray Bridge, Australia
Belarus	Mikalai Kazak	8 September 1977 (aged 30)	Vitebsk, Belarus
Canada	Jason Burnett	16 December 1986 (aged 21)	Etobicoke, Ontario
China	Dong Dong	13 April 1989 (aged 19)	Zhengzhou, China
China	Lu Chunlong	8 April 1989 (aged 19)	Jiangyin, China
Denmark	Peter Jensen	5 March 1980 (aged 28)	Copenhagen, Denmark
France	Grégoire Pennes	7 January 1984 (aged 24)	Paris, France
Germany	Henrik Stehlik	29 December 1980 (aged 27)	Salzgitter, Germany
Italy	Flavio Cannone	5 November 1981 (aged 26)	Ponte San Pietro, Italy
Japan	Tetsuya Sotomura	9 October 1984 (aged 23)	Tokyo, Japan
Japan	Yasuhiro Ueyama	16 October 1984 (aged 23)	Sennan, Japan
Portugal	Diogo Ganchinho	12 September 1989 (aged 18)	Santo Estêvão, Portugal
Russia	Alexander Rusakov	31 December 1980 (aged 27)	Yeysk, Russia
Russia	Dmitry Ushakov	15 April 1988 (aged 20)	Yeysk, Russia
Ukraine	Yuriy Nikitin	15 July 1978 (aged 30)	Kherson, Ukraine
United States	Chris Estrada	14 February 1984 (aged 24)	Beeville, Texas

== Female trampoline gymnasts ==
	Name	Country	Date of birth (Age)
Youngest competitor	Luba Golovina	Georgia	20 April 1990 (aged 18)
Oldest competitor	Anna Dogonadze	Germany	15 February 1973 (aged 35)

NOC	Name	Date of birth (Age)	Hometown
Belarus	Tatsiana Piatrenia	18 October 1981 (aged 26)	Mogilev, Belarus
Canada	Karen Cockburn	2 October 1980 (aged 27)	Toronto, Ontario
Canada	Rosannagh MacLennan	28 August 1988 (aged 19)	King, Ontario
China	He Wenna	19 January 1989 (aged 19)	Longyan, China
China	Huang Shanshan	18 January 1986 (aged 22)	Fujian, China
Czech Republic	Lenka Honzáková	16 April 1978 (aged 30)	Teplice, Czech Republic
Georgia	Luba Golovina	20 April 1990 (aged 18)	Tbilisi, Georgia
Germany	Anna Dogonadze	15 February 1973 (aged 35)	Mtskheta, Georgia
Great Britain	Claire Wright	5 August 1979 (aged 29)	Camberley, England
Japan	Haruka Hirota	11 April 1984 (aged 24)	Minoh, Japan
Portugal	Ana Rente	27 April 1988 (aged 20)	Coimbra, Portugal
Russia	Natalia Chernova	6 March 1976 (aged 32)	Krasnodar, Russia
Russia	Irina Karavayeva	18 May 1975 (aged 33)	Krasnodar, Russia
Ukraine	Olena Movchan	17 August 1976 (aged 31)	Mykolaiv, Ukraine
United States	Erin Blanchard	20 November 1989 (aged 18)	Broussard, Louisiana
Uzbekistan	Ekaterina Khilko	25 March 1982 (aged 26)	Tashkent, Uzbekistan
