= Gymnastics at the 2008 Summer Olympics – Women's rhythmic group all-around =

Women's rhythmic group all-around at the Games of the XXIX Olympiad

Medalists
| 1st place, gold medalist(s) | | Margarita Aliychuk; Anna Gavrilenko; Tatiana Gorbunova; Elena Posevina; Daria Shkurikhina; Natalia Zueva | Russia |
| 2nd place, silver medalist(s) | | Cai Tongtong; Chou Tao; Lü Yuanyang; Sui Jianshuang; Sun Dan; Zhang Shuo | China |
| 3rd place, bronze medalist(s) | | Olesya Babushkina; Anastasia Ivankova; Zinaida Lunina; Glafira Martinovich; Ksenia Sankovich; Alina Tumilovich | Belarus |

Women's rhythmic group all-around competition at the 2008 Summer Olympics was held at the Beijing University of Technology Gymnasium.

Teams consist of six gymnasts, five of whom perform in each routine. There are two rounds, a preliminary and a final, with each round consisting of two routines. In the preliminary, each group completes one routine using five ropes and one routine using three hoops and two clubs. The eight teams with the highest combined scores in the two routines advance to the final. There, they perform the two routines again. Scores from the preliminary are ignored, and the groups are ranked according to their combined score in the two finals routines.

== Qualification ==
| Position | Gymnast | 5 | | 3 + 2 | | Total |
| Position | Gymnast | Score | Penalty | Score | Penalty | Total |
|---|---|---|---|---|---|---|
| 1 | Belarus; Olesya Babushkina; Anastasia Ivankova; Zinaida Lunina; Glafira Martinovich; Ksenia Sankovich; Alina Tumilovich | 17.525 | | 17.425 | | 34.950 |
| 2 | Russia; Margarita Aliychuk; Anna Gavrilenko; Tatiana Gorbunova; Elena Posevina; Daria Shkurikhina; Natalia Zueva | 17.000 | 0.200 | 17.700 | | 34.700 |
| 3 | China; Cai Tongtong; Chou Tao; Lü Yuanyang; Sui Jianshuang; Sun Dan; Zhang Shuo | 17.300 | | 17.225 | | 34.525 |
| 4 | Italy; Elisa Blanchi; Fabrizia D'Ottavio; Marinella Falca; Daniela Masseroni; Elisa Santoni; Anzhelika Savrayuk | 17.150 | | 17.375 | | 34.525 |
| 5 | Bulgaria; Tzveta Kousseva; Yolita Manolova; Zornitsa Marinova; Maya Paunovska; Ioanna Tantcheva; Tatiana Tongova | 16.825 | | 16.875 | | 33.700 |
| 6 | Ukraine; Krystyna Cherepenina; Olena Dmytrash; Alina Maksymenko; Vira Perederiy; Yuliya Slobodyan; Vita Zubchenko | 15.800 | | 15.825 | | 31.625 |
| 7 | Israel; Ilena Dvornichenko; Katerina Pisetsky; Maria Savenkov; Rahel Vigdozchik; Veronika Vitenberg | 15.300 | | 16.225 | | 31.525 |
| 8 | Azerbaijan; Anna Bitieva; Dina Gorina; Vafa Huseynova; Anastasiya Prasolova; Alina Trepina; Valeriya Yegay | 15.575 | | 15.875 | | 31.450 |
| 9 | Greece; Dimitra Kafalidou; Vasiliki Maniou; Olga-Afroditi Pilaki; Paraskevi Plexida; Ioanna Samara; Nikoletta Tsagari | 15.400 | | 15.600 | | 31.000 |
| 10 | Japan; Yuka Endo; Chihana Hara; Saori Inagaki; Nachi Misawa; Kotono Tanaka; Honami Tsuboi | 15.425 | | 15.425 | 0.200 | 30.850 |
| 11 | Spain; Bárbara González; Lara González; Isabel Pagán; Ana María Pelaz; Verónica Ruíz; Elisabeth Salom | 15.725 | | 14.375 | 0.400 | 30.100 |
| 12 | Brazil; Luana Faro; Daniela Leite; Tayanne Mantovaneli; Luisa Matsuo; Marcela Menezes; Nicole Muller | 14.900 | | 14.225 | | 29.125 |

== Final ==
| Position | Gymnast | 5 | | 3 + 2 | | Total |
| Position | Gymnast | Score | Penalty | Score | Penalty | Total |
|---|---|---|---|---|---|---|
| Gold medal | Russia; Margarita Aliychuk; Anna Gavrilenko; Tatiana Gorbunova; Elena Posevina; Daria Shkurikhina; Natalia Zueva | 17.750 (1) | - | 17.800 (1) | - | 35.550 |
| Silver medal | China; Cai Tongtong; Chou Tao; Lü Yuanyang; Sui Jianshuang; Sun Dan; Zhang Shuo | 17.575 (3) | - | 17.650 (2) | - | 35.225 |
| Bronze medal | Belarus; Olesya Babushkina; Anastasia Ivankova; Zinaida Lunina; Glafira Martinovich; Ksenia Sankovich; Alina Tumilovich | 17.625 (2) | - | 17.275 (4) | 0.20 | 34.900 |
| 4 | Italy; Elisa Blanchi; Fabrizia D'Ottavio; Marinella Falca; Daniela Masseroni; Elisa Santoni; Anzhelika Savrayuk | 17.000 (4) | - | 17.425 (3) | - | 34.425 |
| 5 | Bulgaria; Tzveta Kousseva; Yolita Manolova; Zornitsa Marinova; Maya Paunovska; Ioanna Tantcheva; Tatiana Tongova | 16.750 (5) | 0.20 | 16.800 (5) | 0.20 | 33.550 |
| 6 | Israel; Ilena Dvornichenko; Katerina Pisetsky; Maria Savenkov; Rahel Vigdozchik; Veronika Vitenberg | 16.050 (7) | 0.05 | 16.050 (6) | - | 32.100 |
| 7 | Azerbaijan; Anna Bitieva; Dina Gorina; Vafa Huseynova; Anastasiya Prasolova; Alina Trepina; Valeriya Yegay | 16.075 (6) | - | 15.500 (7) | 0.05 | 31.575 |
| 8 | Ukraine; Krystyna Cherepenina; Olena Dmytrash; Alina Maksymenko; Vira Perederiy; Yuliya Slobodyan; Vita Zubchenko | 15.975 (8) | - | 15.125 (8) | 0.40 | 31.100 |

== Links ==
- Competition format
- Qualification results
- Final results
