= Azerbaijan at the 2008 Summer Olympics =

- IOC code: AZE
- NOC: National Olympic Committee of the Republic of Azerbaijan
- Website: www.olympic.az (in Azerbaijani and English)

in Beijing
- Competitors: 44 in 10 sports
- Flag bearers: Farid Mansurov (opening); Shahin Imranov (closing)
- Medals Ranked 40th: Gold 1 Silver 1 Bronze 4 Total 6

Summer Olympics appearances (overview)
- 1996; 2000; 2004; 2008; 2012; 2016; 2020; 2024

Other related appearances
- Russian Empire (1900–1912); Soviet Union (1952–1988); Unified Team (1992)

Azerbaijan sent a team to compete at the 2008 Summer Olympics in Beijing, China. In total 44 Azerbaijani athletes went to Beijing, including 14 women.

== Medalists ==
Medal	Name	Sport	Event	Date
Gold	Elnur Mammadli	Judo	Men's 73 kg	August 11
Silver	Rovshan Bayramov	Wrestling	Men's Greco-Roman 55 kg	August 12
Bronze	Shahin Imranov	Boxing	Men's 57 kg	August 22
Bronze	Movlud Miraliyev	Judo	Men's 100 kg	August 14
Bronze	Mariya Stadnik	Wrestling	Women's freestyle 48 kg	August 16
Bronze	Khetag Gazyumov	Wrestling	Men's freestyle 96 kg	August 21
Silver	Vitaliy Rahimov	Wrestling	Men's 60 kg	August 12

Medals by sport
Sport	1st place, gold medalist(s)	2nd place, silver medalist(s)	3rd place, bronze medalist(s)	Total
Boxing	0	0	1	1
Judo	1	0	1	2
Wrestling	0	1	2	3
Total	1	1	4	6

== Competitors ==
Sport	Men	Women	Total
Athletics	2	0	2
Boxing	2	0	2
Equestrian	1	0	1
Gymnastics	0	8	8
Judo	5	1	6
Shooting	0	1	1
Swimming	1	1	2
Taekwondo	1	0	1
Weightlifting	5	0	5
Wrestling	13	3	16
Total	30	14	44

== Athletics ==
Key

- Note – Ranks given for track events are within the athlete's heat only
- Q = Qualified for the next round
- q = Qualified for the next round as a fastest loser or, in field events, by position without achieving the qualifying target
- NR = National record
- N/A = Round not applicable for the event
- Bye = Athlete not required to compete in round

Men

Athlete	Event	Heat		Quarterfinal		Semifinal		Final	
Athlete	Event	Result	Rank	Result	Rank	Result	Rank	Result	Rank
Ruslan Abbasov	100 m	10.58	5	did not advance					
Ramil Guliyev	200 m	20.78	2 Q	20.66	5	did not advance			

== Boxing ==
Athlete	Event	Round of 32	Round of 16	Quarterfinals	Semifinals	Final	
Athlete	Event	Opposition Result	Opposition Result	Opposition Result	Opposition Result	Opposition Result	Rank
Samir Mammadov	Flyweight	Nhaila (MAR); W 19–4	Jongjohor (THA); L 2–10	did not advance			
Shahin Imranov	Featherweight	Jafarov (KAZ); W 9–5	Izoria (GEO); W 18–9	Torriente (CUB); W 16–14	Djelkhir (FRA); L WO	Did not advance	3rd place, bronze medalist(s)

== Equestrian ==
=== Show jumping ===
Athlete	Horse	Event	Qualification								Final					Total	
Athlete	Horse	Event	Round 1		Round 2			Round 3			Round A		Round B			Total	
Athlete	Horse	Event	Penalties	Rank	Penalties	Total	Rank	Penalties	Total	Rank	Penalties	Rank	Penalties	Total	Rank	Penalties	Rank
Jamal Rahimov	Ionesco De Brekka	Individual	1	=14	Eliminated			did not advance									

== Gymnastics ==
=== Rhythmic ===
Athlete	Event	Qualification						Final					
Athlete	Event	Rope	Hoop	Clubs	Ribbon	Total	Rank	Rope	Hoop	Clubs	Ribbon	Total	Rank
Aliya Garayeva	Individual	17.875	16.850	17.625	16.850	69.200	7 Q	17.750	18.075	17.225	16.625	69.675	6
Dinara Gimatova	Individual	16.275	16.775	16.600	16.875	66.525	11	did not advance					

Athlete	Event	Qualification				Final			
Athlete	Event	5 ropes	3 hoops 2 clubs	Total	Rank	5 ropes	3 hoops 2 clubs	Total	Rank
Anna Bitieva; Dina Gorina; Vafa Huseynova; Anastasiya Prasolova; Alina Trepina; Valeriya Yegay	Team	15.575	15.875	31.450	8 Q	16.075	15.500	31.575	7

== Judo ==
Men

Athlete	Event	Preliminary	Round of 32	Round of 16	Quarterfinals	Semifinals	Repechage 1	Repechage 2	Repechage 3	Final / BM	
Athlete	Event	Opposition Result	Opposition Result	Opposition Result	Opposition Result	Opposition Result	Opposition Result	Opposition Result	Opposition Result	Opposition Result	Rank
Ramil Gasimov	−66 kg	Bye	Gadanov (RUS); L 0101–0120	did not advance							
Elnur Mammadli	−73 kg	—N/a	van Tichelt (BEL); W 1000–0000	Siamionau (BLR); W 1001–0001	Kim C-S (PRK); W 0200–0000	Maloumat (IRI); W 1000–0000	Bye			Wang K-C (KOR); W 1000–0000	1st place, gold medalist(s)
Mehman Azizov	−81 kg	Bye	Bischof (GER); L 0011–0020	did not advance			Stevens (USA); L 0001–0200	did not advance			
Elkhan Mammadov	−90 kg	—N/a	Asranqulov (TJK); W 0011–0000	Nabiev (UZB); W 0110–0010	Tsirekidze (GEO); L 0000–1000	Did not advance	Bye	Mesbah (EGY); L 0010–0011	did not advance		
Movlud Miraliyev	−100 kg	—N/a	Azzoun (ALG); W 1000–0001	Zhorzholiani (GEO); W 1010–0000	Brata (ROU); W 0110–0000	Naidangiin (MGL); L 0010–0120	Bye			Matyjaszek (POL); W 0110–0001	3rd place, bronze medalist(s)

Women

Athlete	Event	Round of 32	Round of 16	Quarterfinals	Semifinals	Repechage 1	Repechage 2	Repechage 3	Final / BM	
Athlete	Event	Opposition Result	Opposition Result	Opposition Result	Opposition Result	Opposition Result	Opposition Result	Opposition Result	Opposition Result	Rank
Kifayat Gasimova	−57 kg	Bye	Sato (JPN); L 0100–1001	did not advance						

== Shooting ==
Women

Athlete	Event	Qualification		Final	
Athlete	Event	Points	Rank	Points	Rank
Zemfira Meftahatdinova	Skeet	63	15	did not advance	

== Swimming ==
Men

Athlete	Event	Heat		Semifinal		Final	
Athlete	Event	Time	Rank	Time	Rank	Time	Rank
Tural Abbasov	50 m freestyle	26.31	78	did not advance			

Women

Athlete	Event	Heat		Semifinal		Final	
Athlete	Event	Time	Rank	Time	Rank	Time	Rank
Oksana Hatamkhanova	100 m breaststroke	1:20.22	46	did not advance			

== Taekwondo ==
Athlete	Event	Round of 16	Quarterfinals	Semifinals	Repechage	Bronze Medal	Final	
Athlete	Event	Opposition Result	Opposition Result	Opposition Result	Opposition Result	Opposition Result	Opposition Result	Rank
Rashad Ahmadov	Men's −80 kg	Sarhan (QAT); W 5–0	Michaud (CAN); W 0–0 SUP	Saei (IRI); L 1–4	Bye	S López (USA); L 2–3	Did not advance	5

== Weightlifting ==
Athlete	Event	Snatch		Clean & Jerk		Total	Rank
Athlete	Event	Result	Rank	Result	Rank	Total	Rank
Sardar Hasanov	Men's −62 kg	128	=12	~~152~~	DNF	128	DNF
Afgan Bayramov	Men's −69 kg	145	=10	175	7	320	7
Turan Mirzayev	Men's −69 kg	146	=8	181	5	327	5
Intigam Zahirov	Men's −85 kg	166	8	195	9	361	9
Nizami Pashayev	Men's −94 kg	181	2	215	=5	396	5

== Wrestling ==
Key

- VT – Victory by Fall.
- PP – Decision by Points – the loser with technical points.
- PO – Decision by Points – the loser without technical points.

Men's freestyle

Athlete	Event	Qualification	Round of 16	Quarterfinal	Semifinal	Repechage 1	Repechage 2	Final / BM	
Athlete	Event	Opposition Result	Opposition Result	Opposition Result	Opposition Result	Opposition Result	Opposition Result	Opposition Result	Rank
Namig Sevdimov	−55 kg	Bye	Yang K-I (PRK); W 3–1 ^{PP}	Kim H-S (KOR); W 3–1 ^{PP}	Cejudo (USA); L 1–3 ^{PP}	Bye		Velikov (BUL); L 1–3 ^{PP}	5
Zelimkhan Huseynov	−60 kg	Batirov (RUS); L 0–3 ^{PO}	did not advance			Quintana (CUB); W 3–1 ^{PP}	Ramazanov (MKD); W 3–1 ^{PP}	Mohammadi (IRI); L 1–3 ^{PP}	5
Emin Azizov	−66 kg	Sarrasin (SUI); W 3–0 ^{PO}	Spiridonov (KAZ); L 0–3 ^{PO}	did not advance					12
Chamsulvara Chamsulvarayev	−74 kg	Bye	Haidarau (BLR); L 1–3 ^{PP}	did not advance					15
Novruz Temrezov	−84 kg	Chagnaadorj (MGL); W 3–1 ^{PP}	Yazdani (IRI); W 5–0 ^{VT}	Ketoev (RUS); L 1–3 ^{PP}	did not advance				7
Khetag Gazyumov	−96 kg	Gucman (POL); W 3–0 ^{PO}	Aka-Akesse (FRA); W 3–0 ^{PO}	Kurbanov (UZB); W 3–0 ^{PO}	Muradov (RUS); L 1–3 ^{PP}	Bye		Tibilov (UKR); W 3–0 ^{PO}	3rd place, bronze medalist(s)
Ali Isayev	−120 kg	Bye	Taymazov (UZB); L 1–3 ^{PP}	did not advance		Bye	Rodríguez (CUB); L 0–5 ^{VT}	Did not advance	14

Men's Greco-Roman

Athlete	Event	Qualification	Round of 16	Quarterfinal	Semifinal	Repechage 1	Repechage 2	Final / BM	
Athlete	Event	Opposition Result	Opposition Result	Opposition Result	Opposition Result	Opposition Result	Opposition Result	Opposition Result	Rank
Rovshan Bayramov	−55 kg	Bye	Mohamed (EGY); W 3–0 ^{PO}	Hernández (CUB); W 3–1 ^{PP}	Amoyan (ARM); W 3–1 ^{PP}	Bye		Mankiev (RUS); L 1–3 ^{PP}	2nd place, silver medalist(s)
Vitaliy Rahimov	−60 kg	Sheng J (CHN); W 3–1 ^{PP}	Diaconu (ROU); W 3–1 ^{PP}	Nazarian (BUL); W 3–1 ^{PP}	Tengizbayev (KAZ); W 3–0 ^{PO}	Bye		Albiev (RUS); L 0–3 ^{PO}	DSQ
Farid Mansurov	−66 kg	Bye	Vardanyan (UKR); L 0–3 ^{PO}	did not advance					19
Ilgar Abdulov	−74 kg	Tüfenk (TUR); W 3–1 ^{PP}	Samurgashev (RUS); L 0–5 ^{VT}	did not advance					12
Shalva Gadabadze	−84 kg	Bye	Achouri (TUN); W 3–0 ^{PO}	Fodor (HUN); L 1–3 ^{PP}	Did not advance	Bye	Ma Sy (CHN); L 1–3 ^{PP}	Did not advance	8
Anton Botev	−120 kg	Saldadze (UZB); W 3–1 ^{PP}	Sjöberg (SWE); L 0–3 ^{PO}	did not advance					9

Women's freestyle

Athlete	Event	Qualification	Round of 16	Quarterfinal	Semifinal	Repechage 1	Repechage 2	Final / BM	
Athlete	Event	Opposition Result	Opposition Result	Opposition Result	Opposition Result	Opposition Result	Opposition Result	Opposition Result	Rank
Mariya Stadnik	−48 kg	Bye	Huynh (CAN); L 1–3 ^{PP}	did not advance		Bye	Kim H-J (KOR); W 3–1 ^{PP}	Bakatyuk (KAZ); W 3–1 ^{PP}	3rd place, bronze medalist(s)
Yelena Komarova	−55 kg	—N/a	Golts (RUS); L 0–3 ^{PO}	did not advance					15
Olesya Zamula	−63 kg	Bye	Icho (JPN); L 0–3 ^{PO}	did not advance		Bye	Miller (USA); L 0–5 ^{VT}	Did not advance	16

== See also ==
- Azerbaijan at the 2008 Summer Paralympics
