= Ukraine at the 2008 Summer Olympics =

- IOC code: UKR
- NOC: National Olympic Committee of Ukraine
- Website: www.noc-ukr.org (in Ukrainian and English)

in Beijing
- Competitors: 243 in 20 sports
- Flag bearers: Yana Klochkova (opening); Vasyl Lomachenko (closing)
- Medals Ranked 12th: Gold 7 Silver 4 Bronze 11 Total 22

Summer Olympics appearances (overview)
- 1996; 2000; 2004; 2008; 2012; 2016; 2020; 2024; 2028

Other related appearances
- Austria (1896–1912); Hungary (1896–1912); Russian Empire (1900–1912); Czechoslovakia (1920–1936); Poland (1924–1936); Romania (1924–1936); Soviet Union (1952–1988); Unified Team (1992)

Ukraine competed in the 2008 Summer Olympics. The country repeated its 2004 performance in terms of total medals, but its gold medal haul fell slightly from 8 to 7.

== Medalists ==
| Medal | Name | Sport | Event |
|---|---|---|---|
| Gold | Oleksandr Petriv | Shooting | Men's 25 m rapid fire pistol |
| Gold | Artur Ayvazyan | Shooting | Men's 50 m rifle prone |
| Gold | Viktor Ruban | Archery | Men's individual |
| Gold | Olha Zhovnir; Olha Kharlan; Halyna Pundyk; Olena Khomrova | Fencing | Women's team sabre |
| Gold | Natalya Dobrynska | Athletics | Women's heptathlon |
| Gold | Inna Osypenko | Canoeing | Women's K-1 500 m |
| Gold | Vasyl Lomachenko | Boxing | Featherweight |
| Silver | Jury Sukhorukov | Shooting | Men's 50 m rifle 3 positions |
| Silver | Andriy Stadnik | Wrestling | Men's freestyle 66 kg |
| Silver | Iryna Lishchynska | Athletics | Women's 1500 m |
| Silver | Olena Antonova | Athletics | Women's discus throw |
| Bronze | Roman Hontyuk | Judo | Men's 81 kg |
| Bronze | Illya Kvasha; Oleksiy Pryhorov | Diving | Men's 3 m synchronized springboard |
| Bronze | Armen Vardanyan | Wrestling | Men's Greco-Roman 66 kg |
| Bronze | Irini Merleni | Wrestling | Women's freestyle 48 kg |
| Bronze | Lesya Kalytovska | Cycling | Women's individual pursuit |
| Bronze | Oleksandr Vorobiov | Gymnastics | Men's rings |
| Bronze | Taras Danko | Wrestling | Men's freestyle 84 kg |
| Bronze | Yuriy Cheban | Canoeing | Men's C-1 500 m |
| Bronze | Vyacheslav Glazkov | Boxing | Super heavyweight |
| Bronze | Nataliya Tobias | Athletics | Women's 1500 m |
| Bronze | Anna Bessonova | Gymnastics | Women's rhythmic individual all-around |

== Archery ==
Ukraine's men's archery team took seventh place at the 2007 World Outdoor Target Championships, earning the nation a full complement of three qualification spots for the Olympic men's competitions. The women's team finished in tenth place, six points shy of qualifying as well. Nevertheless, two Ukrainian women (Tetyana Berezhna and Viktoriya Koval) did earn spots via individual qualification in that tournament.

Ukraine has won a silver medal and two bronzes in previous Games, including the bronze medal in the men's team competition in 2004. Viktor Ruban, a member of that 2004 Men's team survived two tie-breaker shots in the semifinals, before beating a Korean opponent by one point in the final to claim the individual gold medal.

Men

| Athlete | Event | Ranking round | | Round of 64 | Round of 32 | Round of 16 | Quarterfinals | Semifinals | Final / BM | |
| Athlete | Event | Score | Seed | Opposition Score | Opposition Score | Opposition Score | Opposition Score | Opposition Score | Opposition Score | Rank |
|---|---|---|---|---|---|---|---|---|---|---|
| Markiyan Ivashko | Individual | 658 | 32 | Morillo (ESP) (33); L 107–115 | Did not advance | | | | | |
| Viktor Ruban | Individual | 678 | 3 | Youssef (EGY) (62); W 111–96 | Naray (AUS) (30); W 115–105 | Proć (POL) (19); W 114–108 | Moriya (JPN) (22); W 115–106 | Badënov (RUS) (31); W 112 (20)–112 (18) | Park (KOR) (4); W 113–112 | 1st place, gold medalist(s) |
| Oleksandr Serdyuk | Individual | 661 | 20 | Pieper (GER) (45); W 107–105 | Dobrowolski (POL) (13); L 111 (8)–111 (9) | Did not advance | | | | |
| Markiyan Ivashko; Viktor Ruban; Oleksandr Serdyuk | Team | 1997 | 2 | —N/a | | Bye | Chinese Taipei (7); W 214–211 | Italy (6); L 221–223 | China (12); L 219–222 | 4 |

Women

| Athlete | Event | Ranking round | | Round of 64 | Round of 32 | Round of 16 | Quarterfinals | Semifinals | Final / BM | |
| Athlete | Event | Score | Seed | Opposition Score | Opposition Score | Opposition Score | Opposition Score | Opposition Score | Opposition Score | Rank |
|---|---|---|---|---|---|---|---|---|---|---|
| Tetyana Berezhna | Individual | 627 | 38 | Zhang Jj (CHN) (27); L 97–109 | Did not advance | | | | | |
| Viktoriya Koval | Individual | 641 | 21 | Horáčková (CZE) (44); W 109–107 | Román (MEX) (12); L 105–111 | Did not advance | | | | |

== Athletics ==
Key

- Note – Ranks given for track events are within the athlete's heat only
- Q = Qualified for the next round
- q = Qualified for the next round as a fastest loser or, in field events, by position without achieving the qualifying target
- NR = National record
- N/A = Round not applicable for the event
- Bye = Athlete not required to compete in round

Men
Track & road events

| Athlete | Event | Heat | | Quarterfinal | | Semifinal | | Final | |
| Athlete | Event | Result | Rank | Result | Rank | Result | Rank | Result | Rank |
|---|---|---|---|---|---|---|---|---|---|
| Dmytro Hlushchenko | 100 m | 10.92 | 5 | Did not advance | | | | | |
| Ihor Bodrov | 200 m | 21.38 | 6 | Did not advance | | | | | |
| Myhaylo Knysh | 400 m | 46.28 | 6 | —N/a | | Did not advance | | | |
| Ivan Heshko | 1500 m | DNS | | —N/a | | Did not advance | | | |
| Oleksandr Kuzin | Marathon | —N/a | | | | | | DNF | |
| Vasyl Matviychuk | Marathon | —N/a | | | | | | 2:17:50 | 27 |
| Oleksandr Sitkovskyy | Marathon | —N/a | | | | | | DNF | |
| Andriy Kovenko | 20 km walk | —N/a | | | | | | 1:22:59 | 24 |
| Serhiy Budza | 50 km walk | —N/a | | | | | | 3:58:21 | 24 |
| Oleksiy Kazanin | 50 km walk | —N/a | | | | | | DNF | |
| Oleksiy Shelest | 50 km walk | —N/a | | | | | | 3:59:46 | 27 |

Field events

| Athlete | Event | Qualification | | Final | |
| Athlete | Event | Distance | Position | Distance | Position |
|---|---|---|---|---|---|
| Andriy Makarchev | Long jump | 7.77 | 23 | Did not advance | |
| Viktor Kuznyetsov | Triple jump | 17.11 | 12 q | 16.87 | 8 |
| Mykola Savolaynen | Triple jump | 17.00 | 16 | Did not advance | |
| Viktor Yastrebov | Triple jump | 16.52 | 26 | Did not advance | |
| Dmytro Demyanyuk | High jump | 2.20 | 21 | Did not advance | |
| Yuriy Krymarenko | High jump | 2.15 | 33 | Did not advance | |
| Oleksandr Nartov | High jump | 2.10 | 39 | Did not advance | |
| Oleksandr Korchmid | Pole vault | 5.35 | 22 | Did not advance | |
| Maksym Mazuryk | Pole vault | 5.55 | 16 | Did not advance | |
| Denys Yurchenko | Pole vault | 5.65 | DSQ | 5.70 | DSQ |
| Yuriy Bilonoh | Shot put | 20.36 | 7 q | 20.63 | 4 |
| Andriy Semenov | Shot put | 20.01 | 14 | Did not advance | |
| Oleksiy Semenov | Discus throw | 60.18 | 24 | Did not advance | |
| Roman Avramenko | Javelin throw | 71.64 | 28 | Did not advance | |
| Artem Rubanko | Hammer throw | 74.47 | 15 | Did not advance | |
| Ihor Tuhay | Hammer throw | 71.89 | 24 | Did not advance | |
| Yevhen Vynohradov | Hammer throw | 74.49 | 14 | Did not advance | |

Combined events – Decathlon

| Athlete | Event | 100 m | LJ | SP | HJ | 400 m | 110H | DT | PV | JT | 1500 m | Final | Rank |
|---|---|---|---|---|---|---|---|---|---|---|---|---|---|
| Oleksiy Kasyanov | Result | 10.53 | 7.56 | 15.15 | 1.96 | 47.70 | 14.27 | 48.39 | 4.30 | 51.59 | 4:28.94 | 8238 | 6 |
| Oleksiy Kasyanov | Points | 968 | 950 | 799 | 767 | 924 | 927 | 837 | 702 | 612 | 752 | 8238 | 6 |

Women
Track & road events

| Athlete | Event | Heat | | Quarterfinal | | Semifinal | | Final | |
| Athlete | Event | Result | Rank | Result | Rank | Result | Rank | Result | Rank |
|---|---|---|---|---|---|---|---|---|---|
| Nataliya Pohrebnyak | 100 m | 11.60 | 4 q | 11.55 | 8 | Did not advance | | | |
| Nataliya Pyhyda | 200 m | 22.91 | 1 Q | 23.03 | 4 q | 22.95 | 6 | Did not advance | |
| Antonina Yefremova | 400 m | 53.22 | 6 | —N/a | | Did not advance | | | |
| Yuliya Krevsun | 800 m | 2:00.21 | 1 Q | —N/a | | 1:57.32 | 2 Q | 1:58.73 | 7 |
| Tetiana Petlyuk | 800 m | 2:00.00 | 2 Q | —N/a | | 1:59.27 | 4 | Did not advance | |
| Iryna Lishchynska | 1500 m | 4:13.60 | 1 Q | —N/a | | | | 4:01.63 | 2nd place, silver medalist(s) |
| Anna Mishchenko | 1500 m | 4:05.61 | 4 q | —N/a | | | | 4:05.13 | 9 |
| Nataliya Tobias | 1500 m | 4:03.19 | 2 Q | —N/a | | | | 4:01.76 | 3rd place, bronze medalist(s) |
| Nataliya Berkut | 10000 m | —N/a | | | | | | DNS | |
| Yevgeniya Snihur | 100 m hurdles | 13.06 | 5 | —N/a | | Did not advance | | | |
| Anastasiya Rabchenyuk | 400 m hurdles | 55.18 | 2 Q | —N/a | | 54.60 | 2 Q | 53.96 | 4 |
| Valentyna Horpynych | 3000 m steeplechase | 9:43.95 | 11 | —N/a | | | | Did not advance | |
| Nataliya Pohrebnyak; Nataliya Pyhyda; Oksana Shcherbak; Iryna Shepetyuk | 4 × 100 m relay | DSQ | | —N/a | | | | Did not advance | |
| Kseniya Karandyuk; Tetiana Petlyuk; Nataliya Pyhyda; Oksana Shcherbak | 4 × 400 m relay | 3:27.91 | 5 | —N/a | | | | Did not advance | |
| Tetyana Filonyuk | Marathon | —N/a | | | | | | 2:33:35 | 31 |
| Oksana Sklyarenko | Marathon | —N/a | | | | | | 2:55:39 | 69 |
| Nadiya Prokopuk | 20 km walk | —N/a | | | | | | 1:35:50 | 33 |
| Vira Zozulya | 20 km walk | —N/a | | | | | | 1:30:31 | 16 |

Field events

| Athlete | Event | Qualification | | Final | |
| Athlete | Event | Distance | Position | Distance | Position |
|---|---|---|---|---|---|
| Lyudmila Blonska | Long jump | ~~6.76~~ | DSQ | Did not advance | |
| Viktoriya Rybalko | Long jump | 6.43 | 23 | Did not advance | |
| Oleksandra Stadnyuk | Long jump | 6.19 | 32 | Did not advance | |
| Liliya Kulyk | Triple jump | 13.66 | 24 | Did not advance | |
| Svitlana Mamyeyeva | Triple jump | 14.01 | 13 | Did not advance | |
| Olha Saladukha | Triple jump | 14.46 | 7 q | 14.70 | 7 |
| Vita Palamar | High jump | 1.93 | DSQ | 1.99 | DSQ |
| Vita Styopina | High jump | 1.93 | =1 q | 1.93 | 9 |
| Nataliya Kushch | Pole vault | 4.15 | 27 | Did not advance | |
| Olena Antonova | Discus throw | 61.25 | 11 q | 62.59 | 2nd place, silver medalist(s) |
| Kateryna Karsak | Discus throw | 58.61 | 21 | Did not advance | |
| Nataliya Semonova | Discus throw | 60.18 | 14 | Did not advance | |
| Olha Ivankova | Javelin throw | 57.05 | 25 | Did not advance | |
| Tetyana Lyakhovych | Javelin throw | 55.50 | 35 | Did not advance | |
| Vira Rebryk | Javelin throw | 59.05 | 16 | Did not advance | |
| Iryna Novozhylova | Hammer throw | 68.11 | 13 | Did not advance | |
| Inna Sayenko | Hammer throw | 66.92 | 25 | Did not advance | |
| Iryna Sekachova | Hammer throw | 67.47 | 24 | Did not advance | |

Combined events – Heptathlon

| Athlete | Event | 100H | HJ | SP | 200 m | LJ | JT | 800 m | Final | Rank |
|---|---|---|---|---|---|---|---|---|---|---|
| Lyudmila Blonska | Result | 13.31 | 1.86 | 14.29 | 24.14 | 6.48 | 47.60 | 2:09.44 | ~~6700~~ | DSQ* |
| Lyudmila Blonska | Points | 1078 | 1054 | 813 | 967 | 1001 | 814 | 973 | ~~6700~~ | DSQ* |
| Nataliya Dobrynska | Result | 13.44 | 1.80 | 17.29 | 24.39 | 6.63 | 48.60 | 2:17.72 | 6733 | 1st place, gold medalist(s) |
| Nataliya Dobrynska | Points | 1059 | 978 | 1015 | 944 | 1049 | 833 | 855 | 6733 | 1st place, gold medalist(s) |
| Hanna Melnychenko | Result | 13.52 | 1.80 | 13.18 | 24.35 | 6.40 | 35.89 | 2:15.23 | 6165 | 13 |
| Hanna Melnychenko | Points | 1047 | 978 | 739 | 947 | 975 | 589 | 890 | 6165 | 13 |

* Both Natalya Dobrynska and Lyudmila Blonska originally won medals in the heptathlon, but after Blonska tested positive for the banned substance methyltestosterone, she was stripped of her silver medal, which went to the United States' Hyleas Fountain.

== Badminton ==
| Athlete | Event | Round of 64 | Round of 32 | Round of 16 | Quarterfinal | Semifinal | Final / BM | |
| Athlete | Event | Opposition Score | Opposition Score | Opposition Score | Opposition Score | Opposition Score | Opposition Score | Rank |
|---|---|---|---|---|---|---|---|---|
| Vladislav Druzchenko | Men's singles | Lång (FIN); L 12–21, 19–21 | Did not advance | | | | | |
| Larisa Griga | Women's singles | Allegrini (ITA); W 21–15, 21–11 | Nehwal (IND); L 18–21, 10–21 | Did not advance | | | | |

== Boxing ==
Ukraine qualified eight boxers for the Olympic boxing tournament. Chygayev, Lomachenko, Dervyanchenko, and Glazkov earned their spots at the 2007 World Championships. The remaining four Ukrainian boxers qualified at the first European qualifying tournament.

Vasyl Lomachenko had an won all his bouts and finishing with gold medal victory in the final when the referee stopped the fight.

| Athlete | Event | Round of 32 | Round of 16 | Quarterfinals | Semifinals | Final | |
| Athlete | Event | Opposition Result | Opposition Result | Opposition Result | Opposition Result | Opposition Result | Rank |
|---|---|---|---|---|---|---|---|
| Georgiy Chygayev | Light flyweight | Ayrapetyan (RUS); W 13–11 | Hernández (CUB); L 3–21 | Did not advance | | | |
| Vasyl Lomachenko | Featherweight | Selimov (RUS); W 14–7 | Sooltonov (UZB); W 13–1 | Li Y (CHN); W 12–3 | Kılıç (TUR); W 10–1 | Djelkhir (FRA); W RSC | 1st place, gold medalist(s) |
| Oleksandr Klyuchko | Lightweight | Hu Q (CHN); L 8–10 | Did not advance | | | | |
| Oleksandr Stretskyy | Welterweight | Castillo (DOM); W 9–6 | Johnson (BAH); L 4–9 | Did not advance | | | |
| Sergiy Derevyanchenko | Middleweight | Wang Jz (CHN); W 15–6 | Correa (CUB); L 4–18 | Did not advance | | | |
| Oleksandr Usyk | Heavyweight | —N/a | Yushan (CHN); W 23–4 | Russo (ITA); L 4–7 | Did not advance | | |
| Vyacheslav Glazkov | Super heavyweight | —N/a | Alfonso (CUB); W 5–3 | Ouatah (ALG); W 10–4 | Zhang Zl (CHN); L WO | Did not advance | 3rd place, bronze medalist(s) |

== Canoeing ==
=== Sprint ===
Men

| Athlete | Event | Heats | | Semifinals | | Final | |
| Athlete | Event | Time | Rank | Time | Rank | Time | Rank |
|---|---|---|---|---|---|---|---|
| Yuriy Cheban | C-1 500 m | 1:49.454 | 3 QS | 1:51.507 | 1 Q | 1:48.766 | 3rd place, bronze medalist(s) |
| Yuriy Cheban | C-1 1000 m | 4:23.188 | 6 QS | 4:06.095 | 7 | Did not advance | |
| Sergiy Bezuglyy; Maksym Prokopenko | C-2 500 m | 1:42.054 | 3 QF | Bye | | 1:44.157 | 8 |
| Ruslan Dzhalilov; Petro Kruk | C-2 1000 m | 4:06.744 | 7 QS | 3:46.050 | 5 | Did not advance | |

Women

| Athlete | Event | Heats | | Semifinals | | Final | |
| Athlete | Event | Time | Rank | Time | Rank | Time | Rank |
|---|---|---|---|---|---|---|---|
| Inna Osypenko | K-1 500 m | 1:49.776 | 5 QS | 1:51.558 | 1 Q | 1:50.673 | 1st place, gold medalist(s) |

Qualification Legend: QS = Qualify to semi-final; QF = Qualify directly to final

== Cycling ==
=== Road ===
Men

| Athlete | Event | Time | Rank |
|---|---|---|---|
| Andriy Hryvko | Road race | Did not finish | |
| Andriy Hryvko | Time trial | 1:08:01 | 32 |
| Denys Kostyuk | Road race | 6:39:42 | 77 |
| Denys Kostyuk | Time trial | 1:09:04 | 37 |
| Ruslan Pidgornyy | Road race | 6:34:22 | 53 |
| Yaroslav Popovych | Road race | 6:26:17 | 36 |

Women

| Athlete | Event | Time | Rank |
|---|---|---|---|
| Oksana Kashchyshyna | Road race | 3:34:13 | 42 |
| Tetyana Styazhkina | Road race | 3:33:17 | 32 |
| Yevheniya Vysotska | Road race | 3:32:55 | 22 |

=== Track ===
Ukraine qualified a men's team pursuit entry, along with Volodymyr Dyudya in the individual pursuit, and Lesya Kalytovska in the women's pursuit and points race.

Pursuit

| Athlete | Event | Qualification | | Semifinals | | Final | |
| Athlete | Event | Time | Rank | Opponent Results | Rank | Opponent Results | Rank |
|---|---|---|---|---|---|---|---|
| Volodymyr Dyudya | Men's individual pursuit | 4:21.530 | 4 Q | Burke (GBR); 4:22.471 | 5 | Did not advance | |
| Vitaliy Popkov | Men's individual pursuit | 4:30.321 | 14 | Did not advance | | | |
| Lesya Kalytovska | Women's individual pursuit | 3:31.942 | 3 Q | Sereikaitė (LTU); 3:31.785 | 3 Q | Shanks (NZL); 3:31.413 | 3rd place, bronze medalist(s) |
| Volodymyr Dyudya; Lyubomyr Polatayko; Maksym Polishchuk; Vitaliy Shchedov | Men's team pursuit | 4:07.883 | 9 | Did not advance | | | |

Keirin

| Athlete | Event | 1st round | Repechage | 2nd round | Finals |
| Athlete | Event | Rank | Rank | Rank | Rank |
|---|---|---|---|---|---|
| Andrii Vynokurov | Men's keirin | 4 R | 2 | Did not advance | |

Omnium

| Athlete | Event | Points | Laps | Rank |
|---|---|---|---|---|
| Volodymyr Rybin | Men's points race | 8 | 0 | 14 |
| Lesya Kalytovska | Women's points race | 10 | 0 | 5 |
| Lyubomyr Polatayko; Volodymyr Rybin | Men's madison | 0 | −3 | 15 |

=== Mountain biking ===
| Athlete | Event | Time | Rank |
|---|---|---|---|
| Serhiy Rysenko | Men's cross-country | Did not finish | |

== Diving ==
Men

| Athlete | Event | Preliminaries | | Semifinals | | Final | |
| Athlete | Event | Points | Rank | Points | Rank | Points | Rank |
|---|---|---|---|---|---|---|---|
| Illya Kvasha | 3 m springboard | 461.65 | 8 Q | 439.55 | 15 | Did not advance | |
| Yuriy Shlyakhov | 3 m springboard | 405.05 | 23 | Did not advance | | | |
| Kostyantyn Milyayev | 10 m platform | 410.05 | 20 | Did not advance | | | |
| Anton Zakharov | 10 m platform | 344.95 | 29 | Did not advance | | | |
| Illya Kvasha; Oleksiy Pryhorov | 3 m synchronized springboard | —N/a | | | | 415.05 | 3rd place, bronze medalist(s) |

Women

| Athlete | Event | Preliminaries | | Semifinals | | Final | |
| Athlete | Event | Points | Rank | Points | Rank | Points | Rank |
|---|---|---|---|---|---|---|---|
| Olena Fedorova | 3 m springboard | 323.75 | 7 Q | 329.10 | 6 Q | 298.40 | 11 |
| Hanna Pysmenska | 3 m springboard | 223.50 | 26 | Did not advance | | | |
| Iuliia Prokopchuk | 10 m platform | 290.40 | 20 | Did not advance | | | |
| Hanna Pysmenska; Mariya Voloshchenko | 3 m synchronized springboard | —N/a | | | | 293.10 | 7 |

== Equestrian ==
=== Jumping ===
| Athlete | Horse | Event | Qualification | | | | | | | | Final | | | | | Total | |
| Athlete | Horse | Event | Round 1 | | Round 2 | | | Round 3 | | | Round A | | Round B | | | Total | |
| Athlete | Horse | Event | Penalties | Rank | Penalties | Total | Rank | Penalties | Total | Rank | Penalties | Rank | Penalties | Total | Rank | Penalties | Rank |
|---|---|---|---|---|---|---|---|---|---|---|---|---|---|---|---|---|---|
| Björn Nagel | Magic Bengtsson | Individual | 10 | 56 | 9 | 19 | 44 Q | Did not start | | | Did not advance | | | | | | |
| Katharina Offel | Lord Spezi | Individual | 27 | 73 | 17 | 44 | 65 | Did not advance | | | | | | | | 44 | 65 |
| Oleksandr Onyshchenko | Codar | Individual | 18 | 70 | Eliminated | | | Did not advance | | | | | | | | 18 | 70 |
| Jean-Claude Vangeenberghe | Quintus | Individual | 5 | 39 | 8 | 13 | 33 Q | 4 | 17 | 33 Q | 4 | 11 Q | 4 | 8 | 10 | 8 | 10 |
| Björn Nagel; Katharina Offel; Oleksandr Onyshchenko; Jean-Claude Vangeenberghe | See above | Team | —N/a | | | | | | | | 34 | 12 | Did not advance | | | 34 | 12 |

== Fencing ==
Ukraine qualified teams in both Women's sabre and Men's épée, along with individuals in both women's épée and foil. The Ukrainian women's sabre team captured their nation's first gold medal at the 2008 Olympic Games.

Men

| Athlete | Event | Round of 64 | Round of 32 | Round of 16 | Quarterfinal | Semifinal | Final / BM | |
| Athlete | Event | Opposition Score | Opposition Score | Opposition Score | Opposition Score | Opposition Score | Opposition Score | Rank |
|---|---|---|---|---|---|---|---|---|
| Dmytro Chumak | Individual épée | Bye | Limardo (VEN); W 15–13 | Jin S-J (KOR); L 7–15 | Did not advance | | | |
| Maksym Khvorost | Individual épée | Bye | Tikhomirov (CAN); L 11–15 | Did not advance | | | | |
| Bohdan Nikishyn | Individual épée | Wood (RSA); W 15–7 | Kauter (SUI); L 12–15 | Did not advance | | | | |
| Dmytro Chumak; Maksym Khvorost; Vitaly Medvedev; Bohdan Nikishyn | Team épée | —N/a | | | Poland; L 37–45 | Classification semi-final Hungary; L 29–49 | 7th place final South Korea; W 41–39 | 7 |

Women

| Athlete | Event | Round of 64 | Round of 32 | Round of 16 | Quarterfinal | Semifinal | Final / BM | |
| Athlete | Event | Opposition Score | Opposition Score | Opposition Score | Opposition Score | Opposition Score | Opposition Score | Rank |
|---|---|---|---|---|---|---|---|---|
| Yana Shemyakina | Individual épée | —N/a | Jiménez (PAN); L 13–15 | Did not advance | | | | |
| Olha Leleyko | Individual foil | Mroczkiewicz (POL); L 9–15 | Did not advance | | | | | |
| Olha Kharlan | Individual sabre | Marzocca (ITA); W 15–8 | Jacobson (USA); L 13–15 | Did not advance | | | | |
| Olena Khomrova | Individual sabre | Socha (POL); W 15–11 | Dyachenko (RUS); W 15–14 | Jacobson (USA); L 11–15 | Did not advance | | | |
| Halyna Pundyk | Individual sabre | du Plooy (RSA); W 15–7 | Velikaya (RUS); L 7–15 | Did not advance | | | | |
| Olha Kharlan; Olena Khomrova; Halyna Pundyk; Olha Zhovnir | Team sabre | —N/a | | | Russia; W 45–34 | United States; W 45–39 | China; W 45–44 | 1st place, gold medalist(s) |

== Gymnastics ==
=== Artistic ===
Men

| Athlete | Event | Qualification | | | | | | | | Final | | | | | | | |
| Athlete | Event | Apparatus | | | | | | Total | Rank | Apparatus | | | | | | Total | Rank |
| Athlete | Event | F | PH | R | V | PB | HB | Total | Rank | F | PH | R | V | PB | HB | Total | Rank |
|---|---|---|---|---|---|---|---|---|---|---|---|---|---|---|---|---|---|
| Valeriy Honcharov | Parallel bars | —N/a | | | | 16.000 | —N/a | 16.000 | 11 | Did not advance | | | | | | | |
| Valeriy Honcharov | Horizontal bar | —N/a | | | | | 13.850 | 13.850 | 62 | Did not advance | | | | | | | |
| Oleksandr Vorobyov | Rings | —N/a | | 16.250 | —N/a | | | 16.250 | 3 Q | —N/a | | 16.250 | —N/a | | | 16.325 | 3rd place, bronze medalist(s) |

Women
Team

| Athlete | Event | Qualification | | | | | | Final | | | | | |
| Athlete | Event | Apparatus | | | | Total | Rank | Apparatus | | | | Total | Rank |
| Athlete | Event | F | V | UB | BB | Total | Rank | F | V | UB | BB | Total | Rank |
|---|---|---|---|---|---|---|---|---|---|---|---|---|---|
| Valentyna Holenkova | Team | 14.375 | 13.975 | 14.275 | 14.125 | 56.750 | 37 R | Did not advance | | | | | |
| Anastasia Koval | Team | —N/a | | 16.325 Q | 13.000 | —N/a | | Did not advance | | | | | |
| Alina Kozich | Team | 13.625 | 14.975 | 15.175 | 12.000 | 55.775 | 45 | Did not advance | | | | | |
| Iryna Krasnianska | Team | 14.250 | 14.200 | 15.025 | —N/a | | | Did not advance | | | | | |
| Maryna Proskurina | Team | —N/a | 14.850 | 14.625 | 13.675 | —N/a | | Did not advance | | | | | |
| Dariya Zgoba | Team | —N/a | | 15.675 Q | 14.875 | —N/a | | Did not advance | | | | | |
| Total | Team | 60.625 | 58.000 | 59.700 | 52.800 | 231.125 | 11 | Did not advance | | | | | |

Individual finals

| Athlete | Event | Apparatus | | | | Total | Rank |
| Athlete | Event | F | V | UB | BB | Total | Rank |
|---|---|---|---|---|---|---|---|
| Anastasia Koval | Uneven bars | —N/a | | 16.375 | —N/a | 16.375 | 5 |
| Dariya Zgoba | Uneven bars | —N/a | | 14.875 | —N/a | 14.875 | 8 |

=== Rhythmic ===
Ukraine have qualified a group and two individuals for Beijing.

| Athlete | Event | Qualification | | | | | | Final | | | | | |
| Athlete | Event | Rope | Hoop | Clubs | Ribbon | Total | Rank | Rope | Hoop | Clubs | Ribbon | Total | Rank |
|---|---|---|---|---|---|---|---|---|---|---|---|---|---|
| Anna Bessonova | Individual | 17.950 | 18.450 | 18.100 | 18.325 | 72.825 | 3 Q | 17.975 | 17.775 | 17.900 | 18.225 | 71.875 | 3rd place, bronze medalist(s) |
| Natalia Godunko | Individual | 17.500 | 17.375 | 17.650 | 16.875 | 69.400 | 6 Q | 16.700 | 17.500 | 17.525 | 17.125 | 68.850 | 7 |

| Athlete | Event | Qualification | | | | Final | | | |
| Athlete | Event | 5 ropes | 3 hoops 2 clubs | Total | Rank | 5 ropes | 3 hoops 2 clubs | Total | Rank |
|---|---|---|---|---|---|---|---|---|---|
| Krystyna Cherepenina; Olena Dmytrash; Alina Maksymenko; Vira Perederiy; Yuliya Slobodyan; Vita Zubchenko | Team | 15.800 | 15.825 | 31.625 | 6 Q | 15.975 | 15.125 | 31.100 | 8 |

=== Trampoline ===
| Athlete | Event | Qualification | | Final | |
| Athlete | Event | Score | Rank | Score | Rank |
|---|---|---|---|---|---|
| Yuri Nikitin | Men's | 70.70 | 4 Q | 39.80 | 5 |
| Olena Movchan | Women's | 64.80 | 6 Q | 36.60 | 4 |

== Judo ==
Men

| Athlete | Event | Preliminary | Round of 32 | Round of 16 | Quarterfinals | Semifinals | Repechage 1 | Repechage 2 | Repechage 3 | Final / BM | |
| Athlete | Event | Opposition Result | Opposition Result | Opposition Result | Opposition Result | Opposition Result | Opposition Result | Opposition Result | Opposition Result | Opposition Result | Rank |
|---|---|---|---|---|---|---|---|---|---|---|---|
| Maksym Korotun | −60 kg | Lourenço (BRA); L 0001–1001 | Did not advance | | | | | | | | |
| Gennadiy Bilodid | −73 kg | —N/a | Mezhidov (RUS); W 1000–0000 | Boqiev (TJK); L 0000–1000 | Did not advance | | Kibanza (COD); W 0011–0001 | Si (CHN); W 0001–0000 | Guilheiro (BRA); L 0001–1000 | Did not advance | |
| Roman Gontiuk | −81 kg | Bye | Denanyoh (TOG); W 1010–0001 | Valles (COL); W 0110–0001 | Burton (GBR); W 0121–0010 | Bischof (GER); L 0001–0011 | Bye | | | Nyamkhüü (MGL); W 0110–0100 | 3rd place, bronze medalist(s) |
| Valentyn Grekov | −90 kg | —N/a | Camacho (VEN); L 0000–1000 | Did not advance | | | | | | | |
| Yevgen Sotnikov | +100 kg | Bye | Schlittler (BRA); L 0001–0010 | Did not advance | | | | | | | |

Women

| Athlete | Event | Round of 32 | Round of 16 | Quarterfinals | Semifinals | Repechage 1 | Repechage 2 | Repechage 3 | Final / BM | |
| Athlete | Event | Opposition Result | Opposition Result | Opposition Result | Opposition Result | Opposition Result | Opposition Result | Opposition Result | Opposition Result | Rank |
|---|---|---|---|---|---|---|---|---|---|---|
| Lyudmyla Lusnikova | −48 kg | M'barki (TUN); W 0221–0000 | Kim Y-R (KOR); L 0000–0100 | Did not advance | | | | | | |
| Nataliya Smal | −70 kg | Bye | Böhm (GER); L 0010–1001 | Did not advance | | Mendy (SEN); W 0201–0000 | Iglesias (ESP); L 0000–0011 | Did not advance | | |
| Maryna Pryschchepa | −78 kg | Wollert (GER); L 0010–0011 | Did not advance | | | | | | | |
| Maryna Prokof'yeva | +78 kg | Bye | Tong W (CHN); L 0010–0011 | Did not advance | | Donguzashvili (RUS); L 0000–0010 | Did not advance | | | |

== Modern pentathlon ==
| Athlete | Event | Shooting (10 m air pistol) | | | Fencing (épée one touch) | | | Swimming (200 m freestyle) | | | Riding (show jumping) | | | Running (3000 m) | | | Total points | Final rank |
| Athlete | Event | Points | Rank | MP Points | Results | Rank | MP points | Time | Rank | MP points | Penalties | Rank | MP points | Time | Rank | MP Points | Total points | Final rank |
|---|---|---|---|---|---|---|---|---|---|---|---|---|---|---|---|---|---|---|
| Dmytro Kirpulyanskyy | Men's | 184 | 11 | 1144 | 20–15 | 7 | 880 | 2:04.37 | 13 | 1308 | 112 | 10 | 1088 | 10:01.57 | 31 | 996 | 5416 | 9 |
| Pavlo Tymoshchenko | Men's | 185 | 9 | 1156 | 22–13 | 4 | 908 | 2:09.20 | 28 | 1252 | 152 | 17 | 1048 | 9:42.61 | 24 | 1072 | 5436 | 7 |
| Victoria Tereshchuk | Women's | 178 | 17 | 1072 | 22–13 | =5 | 928 | 2:13.97 | 5 | 1316 | 112 | 21 | 1088 | 10:13.25 | 2 | 1268 | 5672 | DSQ* |

== Rowing ==
Men

| Athlete | Event | Heats | | Repechage | | Semifinals | | Final | |
| Athlete | Event | Time | Rank | Time | Rank | Time | Rank | Time | Rank |
|---|---|---|---|---|---|---|---|---|---|
| Serhiy Biloushchenko; Sergiy Gryn; Oleh Lykov; Volodymyr Pavlovskiy | Quadruple sculls | 5:40.11 | 1 SA/B | Bye | | 6:03.71 | 5 FB | 5:47.89 | 8 |

Women

| Athlete | Event | Heats | | Repechage | | Final | |
| Athlete | Event | Time | Rank | Time | Rank | Time | Rank |
|---|---|---|---|---|---|---|---|
| Yana Dementyeva; Kateryna Tarasenko | Double sculls | 7:25.03 | 5 R | 7:06.77 | 4 FB | 7:17.82 | 7 |
| Tetiana Kolesnikova; Nataliya Lialchuk; Olena Olefirenko; Svitlana Spiriukhova | Quadruple sculls | 6:17.84 | 2 R | 6:41.45 | 4 FA | 6:20.02 | 4 |

Qualification Legend: FA=Final A (medal); FB=Final B (non-medal); FC=Final C (non-medal); FD=Final D (non-medal); FE=Final E (non-medal); FF=Final F (non-medal); SA/B=Semifinals A/B; SC/D=Semifinals C/D; SE/F=Semifinals E/F; QF=Quarterfinals; R=Repechage

== Sailing ==
Men

| Athlete | Event | Race | | | | | | | | | | | Net points | Final rank |
| Athlete | Event | 1 | 2 | 3 | 4 | 5 | 6 | 7 | 8 | 9 | 10 | M* | Net points | Final rank |
|---|---|---|---|---|---|---|---|---|---|---|---|---|---|---|
| Maksym Oberemko | RS:X | 3 | 16 | 4 | 9 | 13 | 11 | 24 | ~~DSQ~~ | 11 | 12 | EL | 103 | 12 |

Women

| Athlete | Event | Race | | | | | | | | | | | Net points | Final rank |
| Athlete | Event | 1 | 2 | 3 | 4 | 5 | 6 | 7 | 8 | 9 | 10 | M* | Net points | Final rank |
|---|---|---|---|---|---|---|---|---|---|---|---|---|---|---|
| Olha Maslivets | RS:X | 5 | 6 | ~~14~~ | 11 | 10 | 1 | 4 | 12 | 12 | 12 | 5 | 83 | 8 |

Open

| Athlete | Event | Race | | | | | | | | | | | | | | | | Net points | Final rank |
| Athlete | Event | 1 | 2 | 3 | 4 | 5 | 6 | 7 | 8 | 9 | 10 | 11 | 12 | 13 | 14 | 15 | M* | Net points | Final rank |
|---|---|---|---|---|---|---|---|---|---|---|---|---|---|---|---|---|---|---|---|
| George Leonchuk; Rodion Luka | 49er | 6 | 11 | 12 | 15 | ~~DSQ~~ | OCS | 13 | 15 | 8 | 15 | 10 | 14 | CAN | CAN | CAN | EL | 139 | 15 |
| Pavlo Kalynchev; Andriy Shafranyuk | Tornado | 4 | ~~15~~ | 6 | 13 | 15 | 11 | 12 | 14 | 13 | 11 | —N/a | | | | | EL | 99 | 13 |

M = Medal race; EL = Eliminated – did not advance into the medal race; CAN = Race cancelled; OCS – On the course side: boat was disqualified for being on the course side of the start line before the start signal and failing to return and re-cross the start line.

== Shooting ==
Artur Ayvazyan who had won a pre-Olympic event in Milan, Italy, won the gold medal in the men's 50 metre prone rifle event in Beijing. His teammate Oleksandr Petriv also won a gold medal in the 25 metre rapid fire pistol event with a come-from-behind effort.

Men

| Athlete | Event | Qualification | | Final | |
| Athlete | Event | Points | Rank | Points | Rank |
|---|---|---|---|---|---|
| Artur Ayvazyan | 10 m air rifle | 592 | 21 | Did not advance | |
| Artur Ayvazyan | 50 m rifle prone | 599 | 1 Q | 702.7 | 1st place, gold medalist(s) |
| Artur Ayvazyan | 50 m rifle 3 positions | 1165 | 19 | Did not advance | |
| Roman Bondaruk | 25 m rapid fire pistol | 580 | 3 Q | 774.7 | 6 |
| Oleksandr Lazeykin | 10 m air rifle | 594 | 11 | Did not advance | |
| Mykola Milchev | Skeet | 109 | 35 | Did not advance | |
| Oleh Omelchuk | 10 m air pistol | 579 | 17 | Did not advance | |
| Oleh Omelchuk | 50 m pistol | 563 | 3 Q | 658.9 S/O | 4 |
| Oleksandr Petriv | 25 m rapid fire pistol | 580 | 4 Q | 780.2 | 1st place, gold medalist(s) |
| Ivan Rybovalov | 10 m air pistol | 572 | 35 | Did not advance | |
| Ivan Rybovalov | 50 m pistol | 553 | 20 | Did not advance | |
| Jury Sukhorukov | 50 m rifle prone | 589 | 36 | Did not advance | |
| Jury Sukhorukov | 50 m rifle 3 positions | 1174 | 3 Q | 1272.4 | 2nd place, silver medalist(s) |

Women

| Athlete | Event | Qualification | | Final | |
| Athlete | Event | Points | Rank | Points | Rank |
|---|---|---|---|---|---|
| Natallia Kalnysh | 10 m air rifle | 393 | 27 | Did not advance | |
| Natallia Kalnysh | 50 m rifle 3 positions | 571 | 31 | Did not advance | |
| Olena Kostevych | 10 m air pistol | 378 | 31 | Did not advance | |
| Olena Kostevych | 25 m pistol | 288 | 25 | Did not advance | |
| Dariya Sharipova | 10 m air rifle | 384 | 45 | Did not advance | |
| Darya Shytko | 50 m rifle 3 positions | 577 | 20 | Did not advance | |

== Swimming ==
Men

| Athlete | Event | Heat | | Semifinal | | Final | |
| Athlete | Event | Time | Rank | Time | Rank | Time | Rank |
|---|---|---|---|---|---|---|---|
| Serhiy Advena | 200 m freestyle | 1:48.18 NR | 23 | Did not advance | | | |
| Serhiy Advena | 200 m butterfly | 1:56.24 | 14 Q | 1:56.64 | 15 | Did not advance | |
| Ihor Borysyk | 100 m breaststroke | 1:00.31 | 8 Q | 1:00.55 | 8 Q | 1:00.20 | 7 |
| Ihor Borysyk | 200 m breaststroke | 2:11.08 | 14 Q | 2:10.99 | 14 | Did not advance | |
| Serhiy Breus | 100 m butterfly | 51.82 | 7 Q | 52.05 | 13 | Did not advance | |
| Ihor Chervynskyy | 10 km open water | —N/a | | | | 1:52:14.7 | 12 |
| Valeriy Dymo | 200 m breaststroke | 2:11.65 | 22 | Did not advance | | | |
| Serhiy Fesenko | 400 m freestyle | 3:47.75 | 16 | —N/a | | Did not advance | |
| Serhiy Fesenko | 1500 m freestyle | 15:13.03 | 17 | —N/a | | Did not advance | |
| Oleksandr Isakov | 100 m backstroke | 56.55 | 38 | Did not advance | | | |
| Oleksandr Isakov | 200 m backstroke | 2:03.59 | 39 | Did not advance | | | |
| Vadym Lepskyy | 200 m individual medley | 2:01.73 | 28 | Did not advance | | | |
| Vadym Lepskyy | 400 m individual medley | 4:20.96 | 20 | —N/a | | Did not advance | |
| Oleh Lisohor | 100 m breaststroke | 1:00.65 | 12 Q | 1:00.31 | 9 | Did not advance | |
| Andriy Serdinov | 100 m butterfly | 51.10 | 3 Q | 51.41 | 6 Q | 51.59 | 7 |
| Denys Sylantyev | 200 m butterfly | 1:57.02 | 21 | Did not advance | | | |
| Yuriy Yegoshin | 50 m freestyle | 22.77 | 42 | Did not advance | | | |
| Yuriy Yegoshin | 100 m freestyle | 49.56 | 36 | Did not advance | | | |
| Serhiy Breus; Valeriy Dymo; Oleksandr Isakov; Yuriy Yegoshin | 4 × 100 m medley relay | 3:38.76 | 15 | —N/a | | Did not advance | |

Women

| Athlete | Event | Heat | | Semifinal | | Final | |
| Athlete | Event | Time | Rank | Time | Rank | Time | Rank |
|---|---|---|---|---|---|---|---|
| Iryna Amshennikova | 100 m backstroke | 1:02.85 | 37 | Did not advance | | | |
| Iryna Amshennikova | 200 m backstroke | 2:15.78 | 33 | Did not advance | | | |
| Hanna Dzerkal | 200 m individual medley | 2:18.25 | 25 | Did not advance | | | |
| Tetyana Khala | 200 m butterfly | 2:12.16 | 23 | Did not advance | | | |
| Anna Khlistunova | 100 m breaststroke | 1:09.95 | 25 | Did not advance | | | |
| Nataliya Khudyakova | 200 m freestyle | 2:02.27 | 35 | Did not advance | | | |
| Nataliya Khudyakova | 400 m freestyle | 4:18.34 | 33 | —N/a | | Did not advance | |
| Yuliya Pidlisna | 100 m breaststroke | 1:09.72 | 24 | Did not advance | | | |
| Yuliya Pidlisna | 200 m breaststroke | 2:28.84 | 23 | Did not advance | | | |
| Nataliya Samorodina | 10 km open water | —N/a | | | | 2:10:41.6 | 23 |
| Oksana Serikova | 50 m freestyle | 25.65 | 32 | Did not advance | | | |
| Darya Stepanyuk | 100 m freestyle | 55.51 | 27 | Did not advance | | | |
| Kateryna Zubkova | 100 m backstroke | 1:01.25 | 21 | Did not advance | | | |
| Kateryna Zubkova | 200 m backstroke | 2:12.64 | 21 | Did not advance | | | |
| Kateryna Zubkova | 100 m butterfly | 58.99 | 24 | Did not advance | | | |
| Kateryna Dikidzhi; Hanna Dzerkal; Nataliya Khudyakova; Darya Stepanyuk | 4 × 100 m freestyle relay | 3:44.72 | 14 | —N/a | | Did not advance | |
| Iryna Amshennikova; Yuliya Pidlisna; Darya Stepanyuk; Kateryna Zubkova | 4 × 200 m freestyle relay | 4:08.62 | 16 | —N/a | | Did not advance | |

== Synchronized swimming ==
| Athlete | Event | Technical routine | | Free routine (preliminary) | | | Free routine (final) | | |
| Athlete | Event | Points | Rank | Points | Total (technical + free) | Rank | Points | Total (technical + free) | Rank |
|---|---|---|---|---|---|---|---|---|---|
| Kseniya Sydorenko; Darya Yushko | Duet | 46.084 | 8 | 46.334 | 92.418 | 8 Q | 46.584 | 92.668 | 8 |

== Table tennis ==
| Athlete | Event | Preliminary round | Round 1 | Round 2 | Round 3 | Round 4 | Quarterfinals | Semifinals | Final / BM | |
| Athlete | Event | Opposition Result | Opposition Result | Opposition Result | Opposition Result | Opposition Result | Opposition Result | Opposition Result | Opposition Result | Rank |
|---|---|---|---|---|---|---|---|---|---|---|
| Kou Lei | Men's singles | Saka (CGO); L 1–4 | Did not advance | | | | | | | |
| Margaryta Pesotska | Women's singles | Shumakova (KAZ); W 4–0 | Zhu F (ESP); L 1–4 | Did not advance | | | | | | |
| Tetyana Sorochinskaya | Women's singles | Yossry (EGY); W 4–0 | Monfardini (ITA); L 2–4 | Did not advance | | | | | | |

== Tennis ==
| Athlete | Event | Round of 64 | Round of 32 | Round of 16 | Quarterfinals | Semifinals | Final / BM | |
| Athlete | Event | Opposition Score | Opposition Score | Opposition Score | Opposition Score | Opposition Score | Opposition Score | Rank |
|---|---|---|---|---|---|---|---|---|
| Alona Bondarenko | Women's singles | Sequera (VEN); W 6–1, 0–1^{r} | Janković (SRB); L 5–7, 1–6 | Did not advance | | | | |
| Kateryna Bondarenko | Women's singles | Dementieva (RUS); L 1–6, 4–6 | Did not advance | | | | | |
| Mariya Koryttseva | Women's singles | Obziler (ISR); W 5–7, 7–5, 6–4 | Šafářová (CZE); L 6–2, 1–6, 5–7 | Did not advance | | | | |
| Tatiana Perebiynis | Women's singles | Azarenka (BLR); L 4–6, 7–5, 4–6 | Did not advance | | | | | |
| Alona Bondarenko; Kateryna Bondarenko | Women's doubles | —N/a | Domachowska / Radwańska (POL); W 6–3, 6–3 | Govortsova / Kustova (BLR); W 6–1, 6–3 | Pennetta / Schiavone (ITA); W 6–1, 3–6, 7–5 | S Williams / V Williams (USA); L 6–4, 4–6, 1–6 | Yan Z / Zheng J (CHN); L 2–6, 2–6 | 4 |
| Mariya Koryttseva; Tatiana Perebiynis | Women's doubles | —N/a | Medina Garrigues / Ruano Pascual (ESP); L 2–6, 2–6 | Did not advance | | | | |

== Triathlon ==
| Athlete | Event | Swim (1.5 km) | Trans 1 | Bike (40 km) | Trans 2 | Run (10 km) | Total Time | Rank |
|---|---|---|---|---|---|---|---|---|
| Andriy Glushchenko | Men's | 18:59 | Lapped | | | | | |
| Volodymyr Polikarpenko | Men's | 18:23 | 0:29 | 58:58 | 0:29 | 34:32 | 1:52:51.74 | 35 |
| Yuliya Yelistratova | Women's | 21:02 | 0:30 | 1:05:18 | 0:35 | 36:09 | 2:03:34.39 | 24 |

== Weightlifting ==
Men

| Athlete | Event | Snatch | | Clean & Jerk | | Total | Rank |
| Athlete | Event | Result | Rank | Result | Rank | Total | Rank |
|---|---|---|---|---|---|---|---|
| Artem Ivanov | −94 kg | 170 | 11 | 210 | 11 | 380 | 11 |
| Ihor Razoronov | −105 kg | 187 | 6 | 223 | 8 | ~~410~~ | DSQ* |
| Oleksiy Torokhtiy | −105 kg | 177 | 11 | 213 | 12 | 390 | 11 |
| Ihor Shymechko | +105 kg | 201 | 5 | 232 | 6 | 433 | 5 |
| Artem Udachyn | +105 kg | 207 | 3 | 235 | 4 | 442 | 4 |

Women

| Athlete | Event | Snatch | | Clean & Jerk | | Total | Rank |
| Athlete | Event | Result | Rank | Result | Rank | Total | Rank |
|---|---|---|---|---|---|---|---|
| Natalya Davydova | −69 kg | 115 | =2 | 135 | 3 | 250 | DSQ |
| Nadiya Myronyuk | −75 kg | 105 | 10 | 132 | 9 | 237 | 9 |
| Yuliya Dovhal | +75 kg | 118 | 5 | 140 | 7 | 258 | 7 |
| Olha Korobka | +75 kg | 124 | 2 | 153 | 2 | 270 | DSQ |

* Ihor Razoronov who finished sixth in the men's under-105 kg class, was expelled from the Beijing Olympics after failing a doping test.

== Wrestling ==
Key

- VT – Victory by Fall.
- PP – Decision by Points – the loser with technical points.
- PO – Decision by Points – the loser without technical points.

Men's freestyle

| Athlete | Event | Qualification | Round of 16 | Quarterfinal | Semifinal | Repechage 1 | Repechage 2 | Final / BM | |
| Athlete | Event | Opposition Result | Opposition Result | Opposition Result | Opposition Result | Opposition Result | Opposition Result | Opposition Result | Rank |
|---|---|---|---|---|---|---|---|---|---|
| Vasyl Fedoryshyn | −60 kg | Bye | Zadick (USA); W 3–0 ^{PO} | Bazarguruev (KGZ); W 3–0 ^{PO} | Yumoto (JPN); W 3–1 ^{PP} | Bye | | Batirov (RUS); L 1–3 ^{PP} | DSQ |
| Andriy Stadnik | −66 kg | Schwab (USA); W 3–0 ^{PO} | Kumar (IND); W 3–1 ^{PP} | Batyrov (BLR); W 3–1 ^{PP} | Spiridonov (KAZ); W 3–0 ^{PO} | Bye | | Şahin (TUR); L 1–3 ^{PP} | 2nd place, silver medalist(s) |
| Ibrahim Aldatov | −74 kg | Bye | Gitinov (KGZ); L 1–3 ^{PP} | Did not advance | | | | | 14 |
| Taras Danko | −84 kg | Bye | Mosquera (COL); W 3–0 ^{PO} | Abdusalomov (TJK); L 0–3 ^{PO} | Did not advance | Bye | Kumar (AUS); W 3–0 ^{PO} | Balcı (TUR); W 3–0 ^{PO} | 3rd place, bronze medalist(s) |
| Georgii Tibilov | −96 kg | Bye | Muradov (RUS); L 1–3 ^{PP} | Did not advance | | Bye | Koç (TUR); W 3–1 ^{PP} | Gazyumov (AZE); L 0–3 ^{PO} | 5 |
| Ivan Ishchenko | −120 kg | Bye | Polatçı (TUR); L 1–3 ^{PP} | Did not advance | | | | | 11 |

Men's Greco-Roman

| Athlete | Event | Qualification | Round of 16 | Quarterfinal | Semifinal | Repechage 1 | Repechage 2 | Final / BM | |
| Athlete | Event | Opposition Result | Opposition Result | Opposition Result | Opposition Result | Opposition Result | Opposition Result | Opposition Result | Rank |
|---|---|---|---|---|---|---|---|---|---|
| Yuriy Koval | −55 kg | Fris (SRB); L 1–3 ^{PP} | Did not advance | | | | | | 11 |
| Armen Vardanyan | −66 kg | Bye | Mansurov (AZE); W 3–0 ^{PO} | Begaliev (KGZ); L 1–3 ^{PP} | Did not advance | Bye | Deitchler (USA); W 3–1 ^{PP} | Gergov (BUL); W 3–1 ^{PP} | 3rd place, bronze medalist(s) |
| Volodymyr Shatskykh | −74 kg | Julfalakyan (ARM); L 1–3 ^{PP} | Did not advance | | | | | | 15 |
| Oleksandr Daragan | −84 kg | Bye | Tahmasebi (IRI); L 1–3 ^{PP} | Did not advance | | | | | 14 |
| Oleg Kryoka | −96 kg | Özal (TUR); L 1–3 ^{PP} | Did not advance | | | | | | 14 |
| Oleksandr Chernetskyi | −120 kg | Byers (USA); L 1–3 ^{PP} | Did not advance | | | | | | 17 |

Women's freestyle

| Athlete | Event | Qualification | Round of 16 | Quarterfinal | Semifinal | Repechage 1 | Repechage 2 | Final / BM | |
| Athlete | Event | Opposition Result | Opposition Result | Opposition Result | Opposition Result | Opposition Result | Opposition Result | Opposition Result | Rank |
|---|---|---|---|---|---|---|---|---|---|
| Irini Merleni | −48 kg | Bye | Tsogtbazar (MGL); W 5–0 ^{VT} | Icho (JPN); L 0–5 ^{VT} | Did not advance | Bye | Li Xm (CHN); W 5–0 ^{VT} | Chun (USA); W 3–1 ^{PP} | 3rd place, bronze medalist(s) |
| Nataliya Synyshyn | −55 kg | —N/a | Van Dusen (USA); L 1–3 ^{PP} | Did not advance | | | | | 12 |
| Yuliya Ostapchuk | −63 kg | Bye | Miller (USA); L 1–3 ^{PP} | Did not advance | | | | | 11 |
| Oksana Vashchuk | −72 kg | —N/a | Unda (ESP); L 1–3 ^{PP} | Did not advance | | | | | 12 |

== See also ==
- Ukraine at the 2008 Summer Paralympics
