= Slobodian =

Surname list

Slobodian (also spelled Slobodyan) is a surname. Notable people with the name include:

- Andrea Slobodian, Canadian TV reporter
- Iuliia Slobodyan (born 1992), Ukrainian rhythmic gymnast
- Michael Peter Slobodian (1959-1975), perpetrator of the Brampton Centennial Secondary School shooting
- Oleksandr Slobodian (born 1956), Ukrainian politician
- Peter Slobodian (1918-1986), Canadian professional ice hockey player
- Petro Slobodyan (1953-2020), Ukrainian football player and coach
- Quinn Slobodian (born 1978), Canadian historian
