= Savenkov =

Savenkov (masculine, Russian: Савенков) or Savenkova (feminine, Russian: Савенковa) is a Russian surname. Notable people with the surname include:

- Andrey Savenkov (born 1975), Kazakhstani ice hockey player
- Maria Savenkov (born 1988), Israeli Olympic rhythmic gymnast
