= Gymnastics at the 2008 Summer Olympics – Women's rhythmic individual all-around =

Women's rhythmic individual all-around at the Games of the XXIX Olympiad

Medalists
1st place, gold medalist(s)		Evgeniya Kanaeva	Russia
2nd place, silver medalist(s)		Inna Zhukova	Belarus
3rd place, bronze medalist(s)		Anna Bessonova	Ukraine

Women's rhythmic individual all-around competition at the 2008 Summer Olympics was held at the Beijing University of Technology Gymnasium.

There were two rounds of competition in the individual competition. In each round, competing gymnasts performed four routines. One routine was performed with each of the four apparatus: hoop, clubs, rope, and ribbon. The combined scores from the four routines made up the preliminary round score. The top ten gymnasts after the preliminary round advanced to the finals. There, they performed each routine again. Preliminary scores were ignored, and the top combined final scores won. Eight gymnasts arrived from the past olympic games and six of them were able to repeat an olympic final, Almudena Cid from Spain competed in a record 4th olympic games with their respective finale being thereby the rhythmic gymnast that has reached the most finals.

== Qualification ==
Rank	Name	Nation	Rope		Hoop		Clubs		Ribbon		Total	Notes
Rank	Name	Nation	Score	Penalty	Score	Penalty	Score	Penalty	Score	Penalty	Total	Notes
1	Yevgeniya Kanayeva	Russia	17.850 (4)	-	18.700 (1)	-	18.700 (1)	-	18.825 (1)	0.05	74.075	Q
2	Olga Kapranova	Russia	18.350 (1)	-	18.475 (2)	-	18.200 (2)	-	17.875 (3)	0.05	72.900	Q
3	Anna Bessonova	Ukraine	17.950 (2)	0.05	18.450 (3)	-	18.100 (3)	-	18.325 (2)	-	72.825	Q
4	Inna Zhukova	Belarus	17.850 (4)	-	18.375 (4)	-	17.300 (7)	-	17.425 (4)	-	70.950	Q
5	Aliya Yussupova	Kazakhstan	17.575 (6)	-	17.900 (5)	-	17.575 (6)	-	16.750 (10)	-	69.800	Q
6	Natalia Godunko	Ukraine	17.500 (7)	-	17.375 (6)	-	17.650 (4)	-	16.875 (5)	-	69.400	Q
7	Aliya Garayeva	Azerbaijan	17.875 (3)	-	16.850 (9)	-	17.625 (5)	-	16.850 (7)	0.05	69.200	Q
8	Irina Risenzon	Israel	16.800 (9)	0.05	17.100 (8)	-	17.125 (8)	-	16.825 (9)	-	67.850	Q
9	Simona Peycheva	Bulgaria	16.900 (8)	-	17.125 (7)	0.10	16.475 (12)	-	16.675 (12)	0.05	67.175	Q
10	Almudena Cid	Spain	16.675 (11)	-	16.800 (11)	-	16.600 (9)	-	16.750 (10)	-	66.825	Q
11	Dinara Gimatova	Azerbaijan	16.275 (15)	-	16.775 (12)	0.10	16.600 (9)	-	16.875 (5)	0.05	66.525	R
12	Shin Soo-ji	South Korea	16.325 (14)	-	16.375 (16)	-	16.600 (9)	-	16.850 (7)	-	66.150	R
13	Li Hongyang	China	16.425 (13)	-	16.675 (13)	-	16.375 (14)	-	16.475 (13)	-	65.950	
14	Neta Rivkin	Israel	16.500 (12)	-	16.825 (10)	-	16.450 (13)	-	16.100 (15)	-	65.875	
15	Liubov Charkashyna	Belarus	16.700 (10)	-	15.975 (19)	-	16.375 (14)	-	15.825 (18)	-	64.875	
16	Joanna Mitrosz	Poland	15.950 (17)	0.05	16.250 (17)	0.05	16.025 (19)	0.05	16.000 (16)	0.05	64.225	
17	Caroline Weber	Austria	15.875 (18)	-	16.125 (18)	-	16.250 (16)	-	15.925 (17)	-	64.175	
18	Alexandra Orlando	Canada	15.675 (19)	0.25	16.550 (14)	-	16.175 (18)	-	15.225 (20)	-	63.625	
19	Elizabeth Paisieva	Bulgaria	16.175 (16)	-	16.400 (15)	-	16.200 (17)	-	14.525 (22)	-	63.300	
20	Irina Kikkas	Estonia	15.650 (20)	-	15.225 (21)	0.20	15.700 (20)	-	16.200 (14)	-	62.775	
21	Eleni Andriola	Greece	15.450 (21)	-	14.750 (22)	0.40	14.100 (22)	-	15.400 (19)	-	59.700	
22	Naazmi Johnston	Australia	14.075 (22)	-	15.300 (20)	-	14.825 (21)	-	14.800 (21)	-	59.000	
23	Odette Richard	South Africa	13.975 (23)	-	13.950 (23)	0.20	13.800 (23)	-	13.775 (23)	-	55.500	
24	Wania Monteiro	Cape Verde	12.275 (24)	0.10	13.025 (24)	0.05	12.325 (24)	0.20	11.425 (24)	0.20	49.050	

== Final ==
Rank	Name	Rope		Hoop		Clubs		Ribbon		Total
Rank	Name	Score	Penalty	Score	Penalty	Score	Penalty	Score	Penalty	Total
Gold medal	Yevgeniya Kanayeva (RUS)	18.850 (1)	-	18.850 (1)	-	18.950 (1)	-	18.850 (1)	0.05	75.500
Silver medal	Inna Zhukova (BLR)	18.125 (3)	-	18.125 (3)	-	17.850 (3)	-	17.825 (4)	-	71.925
Bronze medal	Anna Bessonova (UKR)	17.975 (4)	-	17.775 (5)	-	17.900 (2)	-	18.225 (2)	-	71.875
4	Olga Kapranova (RUS)	18.200 (2)	0.10	18.500 (2)	-	16.950 (8)	-	18.050 (3)	-	71.700
5	Aliya Yussupova (KAZ)	17.825 (5)	-	17.625 (6)	-	17.650 (4)	-	16.700 (7)	-	69.800
6	Aliya Garayeva (AZE)	17.750 (6)	-	18.075 (4)	-	17.225 (6)	-	16.625 (8)	-	69.675
7	Natalia Godunko (UKR)	16.700 (8)	0.20	17.500 (7)	-	17.525 (5)	-	17.125 (5)	-	68.850
8	Almudena Cid (ESP)	17.000 (7)	-	17.000 (9)	-	17.150 (7)	-	16.950 (6)	-	68.100
9	Irina Risenzon (ISR)	16.350 (9)	0.05	17.025 (8)	-	16.850 (9)	-	16.550 (9)	-	66.775
10	Simona Peycheva (BUL)	15.975 (10)	0.20	16.975 (10)	0.05	16.775 (10)	-	15.750 (10)	-	65.475
