= Chou Tao =

Chinese rhythmic gymnast

- Full name: Chou Tao
- Born: March 30, 1988 (age 38) Dalian, Liaoning

Gymnastics career
- Discipline: Rhythmic gymnastics
- Country represented: China
Medal record
Olympic Games
Silver medal – second place	2008 Beijing	Group All-around

Chou Tao (Chinese: 侴陶; pinyin: Chǒu Táo; born March 30, 1988, in Dalian, Liaoning) is a Chinese rhythmic gymnast. She won the group gold medal at the 2002 Asian Games.

She represented China at the 2008 Summer Olympics and won a silver medal in the group competition.
