= Olena Dvornichenko =

Israeli rhythmic gymnast

- אלונה דבורניצ'נקו
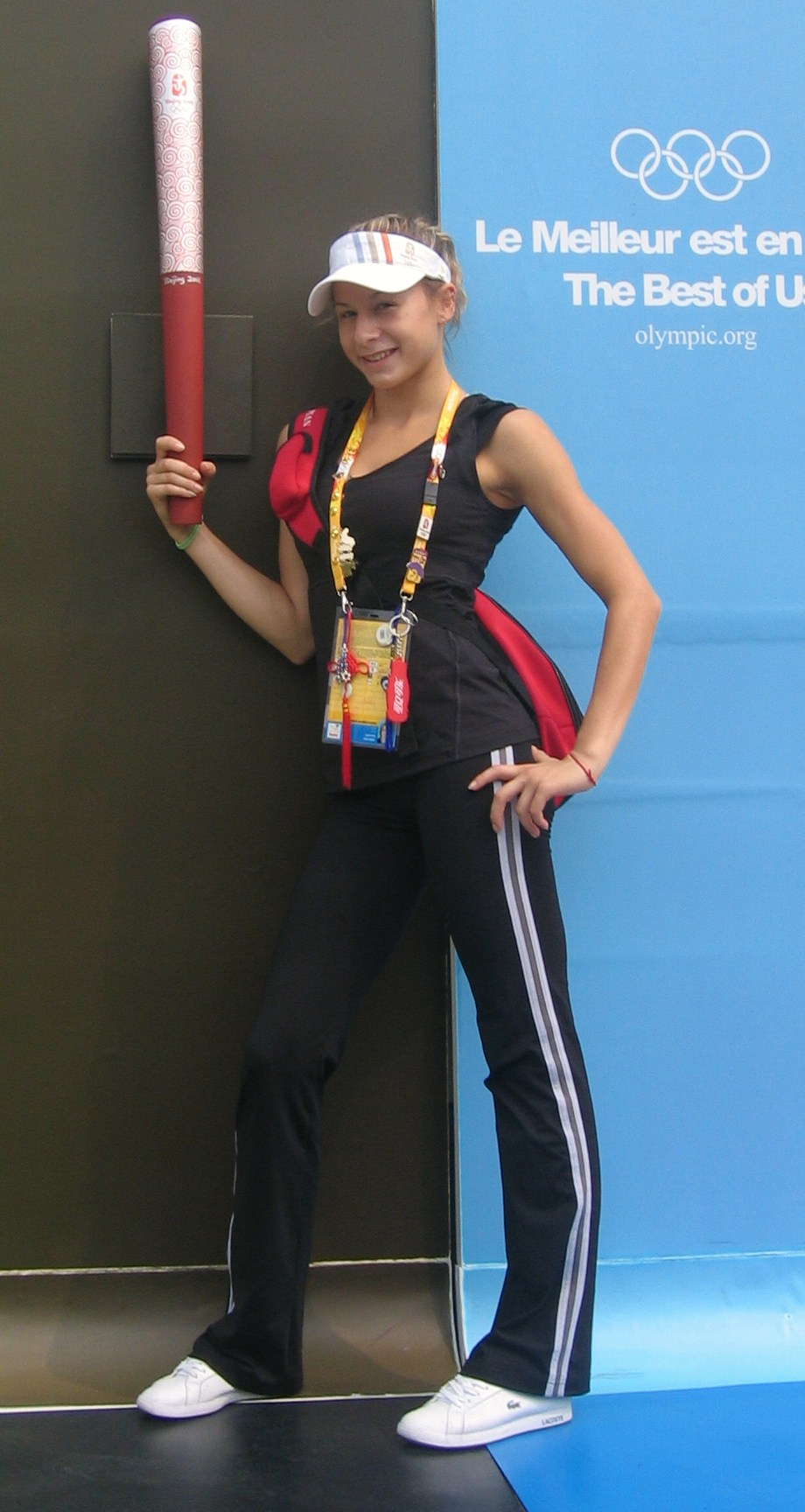

Personal information
- Alternative name: אלונה דבורניצ'נקו
- Born: November 3, 1990 (age 35) Ukraine
- Height: 5 ft 6 in (168 cm)

Gymnastics career
- Discipline: Rhythmic gymnastics
- Country represented: Israel

Olena Dvornichenko (Hebrew: אלונה דבורניצ'נקו; born November 3, 1990) is an Israeli Olympic rhythmic gymnast.

== Biography ==
Dvornichenko is Jewish, and was born in Ukraine.

She and her teammates competed on behalf of Israel at the 2008 Summer Olympics in Beijing, China, and placed 6th in the finals as a part of the Israeli National Rhythmic Gymnastic Team.

She and her Israeli teammates placed 5th in the 2009 World Rhythmic Gymnastics Championships in both Hoops and All-Around in Mie, Japan.
