= Veronika Vitenberg =

Israeli rhythmic gymnast

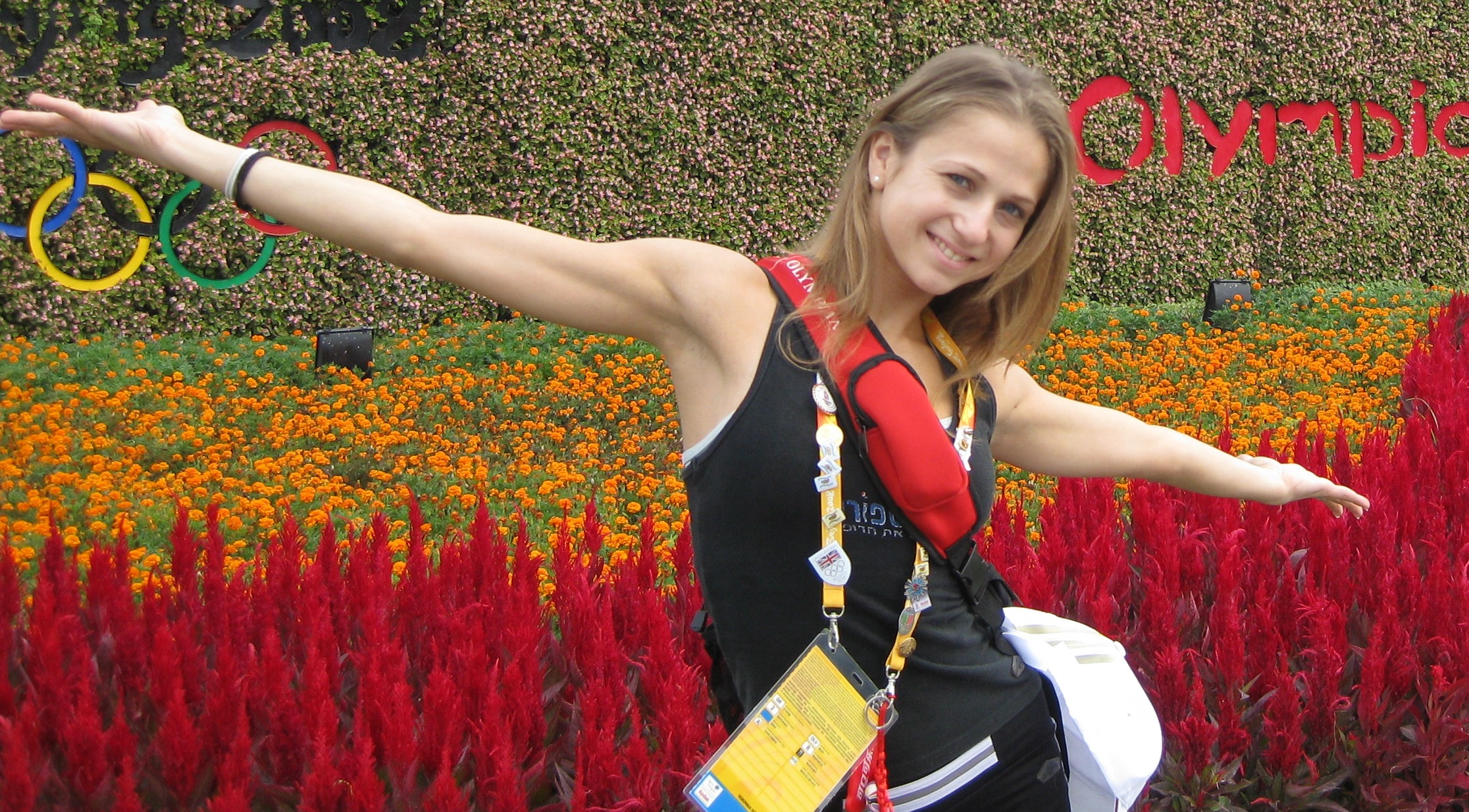
- Veronika Vitenberg at the Olympic Village, Beijing 2008 Summer Olympics

Personal information
- Full name: Veronika Vitenberg
- Alternative names: ורוניקה ויטנברג, Вероника Витенберг
- Nickname: Nika
- Born: 9 September 1988 (age 37) Grodno, Byelorussian SSR, Soviet Union
- Height: 1.60 m (5 ft 3 in)

Gymnastics career
- Discipline: Rhythmic gymnastics
- Country represented: Israel; (2004-)
- Former countries represented: Belarus
- Head coach: Ira Vigdorchik
- Choreographer: Ayelet Zussman

Veronika Vitenberg
- Born: 9 September 1988 (age 37)
- Modeling information
- Height: 1.60 m (5 ft 3 in)
- Hair color: Light brown
- Eye color: Blue
- Website: www.vitenberg.com

Veronika Vitenberg (Hebrew: ורוניקה ויטנברג; born 9 September 1988 in Grodno, Byelorussian SSR) is an Israeli rhythmic gymnast who competed in the 2008 Olympics.

== Career ==
Vitenberg started rhythmic gymnastics at age 6 in Belarus, after her schoolteacher encouraged her to enroll because of her high flexibility. At the age of 13, she immigrated to Israel.

Vitenberg competed for Israel at the 2008 Summer Olympics in Beijing and was a member of the rhythmic gymnastics team that placed 6th in the group final.

== Personal life ==
Vitenberg is Jewish. She served in the Israel Defense Forces from 2007 to 2010 and received an "Athlete of Excellence" status, allowing her to continue training.

In 2009, she began to study for a B.A. degree in business management at the Interdisciplinary Center in Herzliya.

== Competition results ==
- 2004 Israel Championships (2nd, individual)
- 2006 European Championships (6th, team)
- 2007 European Championships (4th, team)
- 2007 World Championships (6th, team)
- 2008 Olympic Games (6th, team)
- 2009 World Championships (5th, team)

== See also ==
- Sports in Israel
- Linoy Ashram
- Nicol Zelikman
- Neta Rivkin
- Irina Risenzon
