= Sui Jianshuang =

Chinese rhythmic gymnast

- Full name: Sui Jianshuang
- Born: February 1, 1989 (age 37) Shenyang, Liaoning

Gymnastics career
- Discipline: Rhythmic gymnastics
- Country represented: China
Medal record
Olympic Games
| Silver medal – second place | 2008 Beijing | Group All-around |
Asian Games
| Gold medal – first place | 2002 Busan | Team |

Sui Jianshuang (simplified Chinese: 隋剑爽; traditional Chinese: 隋劍爽; pinyin: Suí Jiànshuǎng; born February 1, 1989, in Shenyang, Liaoning) is a Chinese rhythmic gymnast. She won the gold medal at the 2002 Asian Games in the group event.

She represented China at the 2008 Summer Olympics and won a silver medal in the group competition.
