= Lü Yuanyang =

Chinese rhythmic gymnast

Lu Yuanyang
- Full name: Lu Yuanyang
- Born: June 22, 1983 (age 43) Sichuan
- Height: 173 cm (5 ft 8 in)

Gymnastics career
- Discipline: Rhythmic gymnastics
- Country represented: China
- Club: Chengdu University
- Head coach: He Xiaomin
- Choreographer: He Xiaomin
Medal record
Olympic Games
Silver medal – second place	2008 Beijing	Group All-around

Lü Yuanyang (simplified Chinese: 吕远洋; traditional Chinese: 呂遠洋; pinyin: Lǚ Yuǎnyáng; born June 22, 1983, in Sichuan) is a Chinese rhythmic gymnast. She represented China at the 2004 Summer Olympics, where she placed 6th in the Group All-Around.

She represented China at the 2008 Summer Olympics and won a silver medal in the group competition.
