= Cai Tongtong =

Chinese rhythmic gymnast

- Full name: Cai Tongtong
- Born: February 7, 1990 (age 36) Wenzhou, Zhejiang

Gymnastics career
- Discipline: Rhythmic gymnastics
- Country represented: China
Medal record
Olympic Games
| Silver medal – second place | 2008 Beijing | Group All-around |

Cai Tongtong (Chinese: 蔡彤彤; pinyin: Cài Tóngtóng; born February 7, 1990, in Wenzhou, Zhejiang) is a Chinese rhythmic gymnast. She won the group championships at the 2006 National Group Championships.

She represented China at the 2008 Summer Olympics and won a silver medal in the group competition.
