= Katerina Pisetsky =

Israeli rhythmic gymnast

- קטרינה פיסצקי
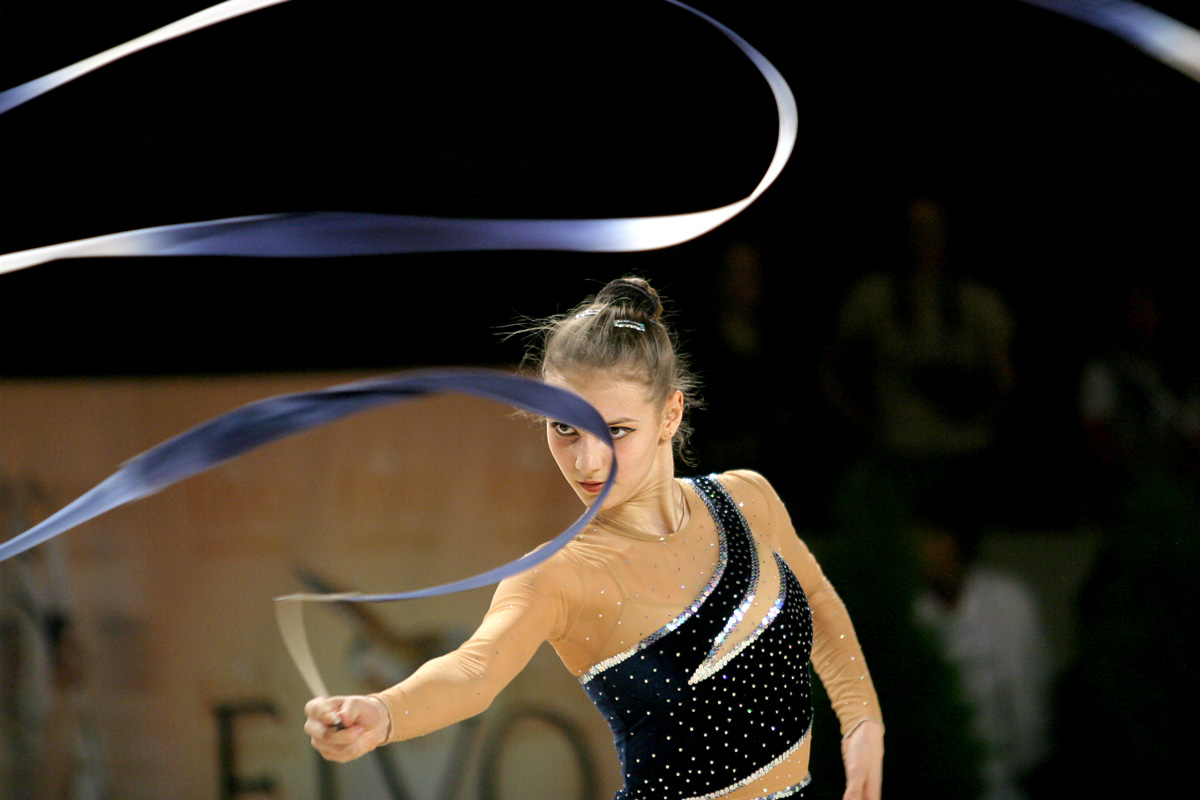

Personal information
- Nickname: Katya
- Born: 26 February 1986 (age 40) Zaporizhia, Soviet Union
- Height: 166 cm (5 ft 5 in)

Gymnastics career
- Discipline: Rhythmic gymnastics
- Country represented: Israel
- Former countries represented: Ukraine
- Club: Sport Learn Petah Tikva
- Head coach: Natasha Asmolov
- Former coach: Lyubov Serebrianskaya

Katerina "Katya" Pisetsky (Hebrew: קטרינה "קטיה" איבגניה פיסצקי) is a Ukrainian-born Israeli rhythmic gymnast who competed at the 2004 and 2008 Olympic Games.

== Early life ==
Katerina Pisetsky was born Yekaterina Yevgenyevna Pisetskaya (Ukrainian: Катерина Євгенівна Пісецька, Russian: Екатерина Евгеньевна Писецкая) on 26 February 1986 in Zaporizhia, Ukrainian SSR, Soviet Union to parents Yevgeny and Tatiana. She is Jewish.

Pisetsky's parents enrolled her in rhythmic gymnastics when she was 6 years old. She first trained with Svetlana Zakharova at the "Priz" club. When Zakharova moved to Germany, she insisted on Pisetsky going to Lyudmila Kovalik, who was the first coach of Oxana Skaldina, a former world champion and Olympic medalist.

== Career ==
Kovalik noticed Pisetsky's potential, and encouraged her to train with Lyubov Serebrianskaya (coach and mother of 1996 Olympic champion Yekaterina Serebrianskaya) at the Gratsia club in Simferopol. Her parents initially opposed the plan, which involved joining a sports boarding school, but accepted due to her grandmother's proximity to the city and ability to visit her often. She gradually developed her body movements and apparatus techniques. For two years, Pisetsky shared a room with Svetlana Rudalova, who later represented Belarus at the Olympics. Pisetsky was a medalist at the Ukrainian Junior Championships. She made her international debut at a 1998 competition in Slovenia and won the event. In 2000, she placed seventh at the Club World Championships in Tokyo.

In 2002, Serebrianskaya was sick with cancer and could not coach as actively as before. The Pisetsky family considered immigrating to Belarus or Israel. Despite her coach's objections, Pisetsky's parents decided to move to Tel Aviv, where she had competed once in 1999. She did not immediately continue gymnastics; after six months, she resumed training with Belarusian native Natasha Asmolov at her club in Petah Tikva.

Pisetsky won the 2002 Israeli Cup. Her first international competition representing Israel was the 2002 Thiais Grand Prix in France, where she placed 24th in the all-around. She was second at the 2003 Israeli Cup and consequently the second-ranked Israeli gymnast at the European Championship in Granada. At the 2002 European Championships, Pisetsky placed 13th in the all-around, the best result by an Israeli gymnast at the event. She also competed at the 2003 European Championships in Riesa, Germany, which was for individual apparatus only. Her top finishes were 10th place for both the ribbon and the clubs events.

Pisetsky initially qualified to the 2004 Olympic Games in Athens by placing 17th at the 2003 World Rhythmic Gymnastics Championships in Budapest. However, the Israeli Olympic Committee's strict criteria required her to place within the top 10 at an international event before she would be approved to compete in Athens. At the 2004 European championships in her native Ukraine, Pisetsky placed 11th all-around, just missing the cutoff. However, the Israeli Olympic Committee gave her a special exemption and named her to the Olympic team. She said learning she had officially qualified to the Olympics was the second happiest moment of her life, behind only the moment she first stepped off the plane after moving to Israel.

In Athens, Pisetsky placed 16th all-around in qualification, missing the cutoff to advance to the final for the top 12. Following the Olympics, she completed her compulsory time serving in the Israeli army.

She competed as part of the Israeli group squad at the 2008 Summer Olympics in Beijing, where the group finished seventh in qualification and sixth in the final.

== See also ==
- Nationality changes in gymnastics
