= Olga-Afroditi Pilaki =

Greek group rhythmic gymnast

Olga-Afroditi Piliaki
- Born: 12 January 1989 (age 37)

Gymnastics career
- Discipline: Rhythmic gymnastics
- Country represented: Greece (2005-2008)

Olga-Afroditi Piliaki (born 12 January 1989) is a Greek group rhythmic gymnast. She represents her nation at international competitions.

She participated at the 2008 Summer Olympics in Beijing. She also competed at world championships, including at the 2005 and 2007 World Rhythmic Gymnastics Championships.

She danced at the Eurovision 2012 stage backing Ivi Adamou and represented Cyprus.

In 2018 she participated at the Greek version of Dancing with the stars.
