= Honami Tsuboi =

Japanese rhythmic gymnast (born 1989)

- Born: 5 April 1989 (age 37) Gifu Prefecture, Japan

Gymnastics career
- Discipline: Rhythmic gymnastics
- Country represented: Japan (2007-2009 (?))

Honami Tsuboi (坪井保菜美, Tsuboi Honami; born 5 April 1989) is a Japanese group rhythmic gymnast. She represents her nation at international competitions.

She participated at the 2008 Summer Olympics in Beijing. She also competed at world championships, including at the 2007 and 2009 World Rhythmic Gymnastics Championships.
