= Maria Savenkov =

Israeli rhythmic gymnast

- Alternative name: מריה סבנקוב
- Born: August 2, 1988 (age 38) Volgograd, Russia
- Height: 5 ft 7 in (170 cm)

Gymnastics career
- Discipline: Rhythmic gymnastics
- Country represented: Israel

Maria Savenkov (Hebrew: מריה סבנקוב; born August 2, 1988) is an Israeli Olympic rhythmic gymnast.

== Biography ==
Savenkov is Jewish, and was born in Volgograd, Russia.

She and her teammates placed 6th in the finals on behalf of Israel at the 2008 Summer Olympics in Beijing, China, as a part of the Israeli National Rhythmic Gymnastic Team.

She and her Israeli teammates placed 5th in the 2009 World Rhythmic Gymnastics Championships in both Hoops and All-Around in Mie, Japan.
