= Yuka Endo =

Japanese rhythmic gymnast (born 1991)

- Born: 30 September 1991 (age 34) Niigata, Niigata Prefecture, Japan

Gymnastics career
- Discipline: Rhythmic gymnastics
- Country represented: Japan; (2008-2011 (?))

Yuka Endo (遠藤 由華, Endō Yuka; born 30 September 1991) is a Japanese group rhythmic gymnast. She represents her nation at international competitions.

She competed at world championships, including at the 2008 Summer Olympics in Beijing, at the 2009, 2010 and 2011 World Rhythmic Gymnastics Championships.
