= Paraskevi Plexida =

Greek group rhythmic gymnast

- Born: 26 June 1991 (age 35)

Gymnastics career
- Discipline: Rhythmic gymnastics
- Country represented: Greece (2007-2008 (?))

Paraskevi Plexida (born 26 June 1991) was a Greek group rhythmic gymnast. She represents her nation at international competitions.

She participated at the 2008 Summer Olympics in Beijing. She also competed at world championships, including at the 2007 World Rhythmic Gymnastics Championships.
