= Chihana Hara =

Japanese rhythmic gymnast

- Born: 13 April 1989 (age 37) Iruma, Saitama, Japan

Gymnastics career
- Discipline: Rhythmic gymnastics
- Country represented: Japan (2007-2009 (?))

Chihana Hara (原 千華, Hara Chihana; born April 13, 1989) is a Japanese former rhythmic gymnast who competed in group events. She represented her nation at international competitions.

She participated at the 2008 Summer Olympics in Beijing. She also competed at world championships, including at the 2007 and 2009 World Rhythmic Gymnastics Championships.
