= Krystyna Cherepenina =

Ukrainian rhythmic gymnast (born 1991)

Krystyna Cherepienina
- Born: 21 November 1991 (age 34)

Gymnastics career
- Discipline: Rhythmic gymnastics
- Country represented: Ukraine (2008)
Medal record
Rhythmic Gymnastics
Representing Ukraine
World Cup Final
Bronze medal – third place	2008 Benidorm	3 hoops/ 4 clubs
Bronze medal – third place	2008 Benidorm	5 ropes

Krystyna Cherepenina (also spelled Cherepienina; born 21 November 1991) was a Ukrainian group rhythmic gymnast. She represents her nation at international competitions. She participated at the 2008 Summer Olympics in Beijing.
