= Vafa Huseynova =

Azerbaijani rhythmic gymnast

Vafa Huseynova (Bakarova)
- Alternative name: Vəfa Hüseynova (Bakarova)
- Born: 10 November 1988 (age 37) Baku

Gymnastics career
- Discipline: Rhythmic gymnastics
- Country represented: Azerbaijan; (2003–2009 (?))

Vafa Huseynova (Bakarova) (also Vəfa Hüseynova (Bəkərova); born 10 November 1988) was an Azerbaijani group rhythmic gymnast. She represented her nation at international competitions.

She participated at the 2008 Summer Olympics in Beijing.

She also competed at world championships, including at the 2005, 2007 and 2009 World Rhythmic Gymnastics Championships.
