= Valeriya Yegay =

Azerbaijani rhythmic gymnast

Valeria Yegay
- Born: 13 December 1986 (age 39) Baku

Gymnastics career
- Discipline: Rhythmic gymnastics
- Country represented: Azerbaijan; (2005-2009 (?))

Valeria Yegay (born 13 December 1986) was an Azerbaijani group rhythmic gymnast. She represented her nation at international competitions.

She participated at the 2008 Summer Olympics in Beijing. She also competed at world championships, including at the 2005, 2007 and 2009 World Rhythmic Gymnastics Championships.
