= Viera Perederiy =

Ukrainian rhythmic gymnast (born 1990)

- Born: 28 February 1990 (age 36)

Gymnastics career
- Discipline: Rhythmic gymnastics
- Country represented: Ukraine; (2007-2009 (?))
Medal record
Rhythmic Gymnastics
Representing Ukraine
World Cup Final
Bronze medal – third place	2008 Benidorm	3 hoops/ 4 clubs
Bronze medal – third place	2008 Benidorm	5 ropes

Viera Perederiy (born 28 February 1990) was a Ukrainian group rhythmic gymnast. She represented her nation at international competitions.

She participated at the 2008 Summer Olympics in Beijing. She also competed at world championships, including at the 2007 World Rhythmic Gymnastics Championships, and 2009 World Rhythmic Gymnastics Championships.
