= Alina Trepina =

Azerbaijani group rhythmic gymnast

- Born: 16 September 1989 (age 36) Baku

Gymnastics career
- Discipline: Rhythmic gymnastics
- Country represented: Azerbaijan (2005-2008 (?))

Alina Trepina (born 16 September 1989) was an Azerbaijani group rhythmic gymnast. She represented her nation at international competitions.

She participated at the 2008 Summer Olympics in Beijing. She also competed at world championships, including at the 2005 World Rhythmic Gymnastics Championships.
