= Anastasiya Prasolova =

Azerbaijani rhythmic gymnast and coach

- Born: 19 October 1989 (age 36) Baku

Gymnastics career
- Discipline: Rhythmic gymnastics
- Country represented: Azerbaijan (2005–2011 (?))

Anastasiya Prasolova (born 19 October 1989) was an Azerbaijani group rhythmic gymnast, and is a coach.

She participated at the 2008 Summer Olympics in Beijing. She also competed at world championships, including at the 2005, 2007, 2009, 2010 and 2011 World Rhythmic Gymnastics Championships. In 2012, she became a certified gymnastics coach.
