= Dina Gorina =

Azerbaijani rhythmic gymnast

- Alternative name: Dina Qorina
- Born: 1 November 1987 (age 38) Baku

Gymnastics career
- Discipline: Rhythmic gymnastics
- Country represented: Azerbaijan (2005–2009 (?))

Dina Gorina (also spelled Qorina, born 1 November 1987) is an Azerbaijani group rhythmic gymnast. She represents her nation at international competitions.

She participated at the 2008 Summer Olympics in Beijing. She also competed at world championships, including at the 2005 and 2009 World Rhythmic Gymnastics Championships.
