= Anna Bitieva =

Azerbaijani rhythmic gymnast (born 1987)

- Born: 17 November 1987 (age 38)

Gymnastics career
- Discipline: Rhythmic gymnastics
- Country represented: Azerbaijan (2005–2008 (?))

Anna Bitieva (also spelled Bitiyeva, born 17 November 1987) was an Azerbaijani group rhythmic gymnast. She represents her nation at international competitions.

She participated at the 2008 Summer Olympics in Beijing. She also competed at world championships, including at the 2005 and 2007 World Rhythmic Gymnastics Championships.
