= Iuliia Slobodyan =

Ukrainian rhythmic gymnast (born 1992)

- Born: 25 September 1992 (age 33)

Gymnastics career
- Discipline: Rhythmic gymnastics
- Country represented: Ukraine (2008-2010 (?))
Medal record
Rhythmic Gymnastics
Representing Ukraine
World Cup Final
Bronze medal – third place	2008 Benidorm	3 hoops/ 4 clubs
Bronze medal – third place	2008 Benidorm	5 ropes

Iuliia Slobodyan (born 25 September 1992) is a Ukrainian former group rhythmic gymnast. She represents her nation at international competitions.

She participated at the 2008 Summer Olympics in Beijing. She also competed at world championships, including at the 2010 World Rhythmic Gymnastics Championships.
