= Anna Gavrilenko =

Russian rhythmic gymnast (born 1990)

- Full name: Anna Vitaliyevna Gavrilenko
- Born: July 10, 1990 (age 36) Sverdlovsk, Russian SFSR, Soviet Union
- Height: 174 cm (5 ft 9 in)

Gymnastics career
- Discipline: Rhythmic gymnastics
- Country represented: Russia
- Gym: Novogorsk
- Head coach: Irina Viner
- Retired: yes
Medal record
Group rhythmic gymnastics
Representing Russia
Olympic Games
Gold medal – first place	2008 Beijing	Group All-around
World Championships
Gold medal – first place	2007 Patras	Group All-around
Gold medal – first place	2007 Patras	5 Ropes
Gold medal – first place	2007 Patras	3 Hoops + 2 Clubs
European Championships
Gold medal – first place	2006 Moscow	Group All-around
Gold medal – first place	2006 Moscow	5 Ribbons
Gold medal – first place	2006 Moscow	3 Hoops + 2 Clubs
Gold medal – first place	2008 Torino	Group All-around
Gold medal – first place	2008 Torino	3 Hoops + 2 Clubs

Anna Vitaliyevna Gavrilenko (Russian: Анна Витальевна Гавриленко) is a Russian group rhythmic gymnast. She is the 2008 Olympic group all-around champion, the 2007 World Group all-around champion and a two-time (2006, 2008) European Group all-around champion.

== Personal life ==
In November 2018, she gave birth to a baby girl Aurora. In October 2026, she gave birth to a baby boy.

== Career ==
Gavrilenko started rhythmic gymnastics at an early age. In 2003, she became a member of the Russian national team since 2003. After initially competing as an individual gymnast, she made her breakthrough in 2006 as a member of the Russian group that won the gold medal at the 2006 European Championships. Gavrilenko was member of the golden winning Russian Group at the 2007 World Championships in Patras, Greece.

Gavrilenko was also a member of the Russian group that competed at the 2008 Summer Olympics in Beijing, China. She received a gold medal in the rhythmic group all-around competition alongside Margarita Aliychuk, Tatiana Gorbunova, Elena Posevina, Daria Shkurikhina and Natalia Zueva. She completed her career at the end of the 2008 season.

== Detailed Olympic results ==
Year	Competition Description	Location	Music	Apparatus	Score-Final	Score-Qualifying
2008	Olympics	Beijing		Group All-around	35.550	34.700
2008	Olympics	Beijing	Ganesh / Famous music from Bombay Dreams by A. R. Rahman	5 Ropes	17.750	17.000
2008	Olympics	Beijing	Guerrileros / Ange et Demon by Maxime Rodriguez	3 Hoops / 2 Clubs	17.800	17.700
