= Gymnastics at the 2008 Summer Olympics =

Gymnastics at the Games of the XXIX Olympiad
- Pictograms for artistic (above) and rhythmic (below)
- Venue: Beijing National Indoor Stadium (artistic and trampoline); Beijing University of Technology Gymnasium (rhythmic)
- Dates: August 9 – 19, 2008

At the 2008 Summer Olympics, three gymnastics disciplines were contested: artistic gymnastics, rhythmic gymnastics and trampoline. The artistic gymnastics events were held at the Beijing National Indoor Stadium on August 9–19. The rhythmic gymnastics events were held at the Beijing University of Technology Gymnasium on August 21–24. The trampoline events were also held at the Beijing National Indoor Stadium on August 16–19.

== Competition schedule ==
All times are China Standard Time (UTC+8)

=== Artistic gymnastics ===
Date	Time	Event
Saturday, August 9, 2008	12:00 - 14:00	Men's Qualification - Subdivision 1
Saturday, August 9, 2008	16:00 - 18:00	Men's Qualification - Subdivision 2
Saturday, August 9, 2008	20:00 - 22:00	Men's Qualification - Subdivision 3
Sunday, August 10, 2008	10:00 - 11:30	Women's Qualification - Subdivision 1
Sunday, August 10, 2008	13:30 - 15:00	Women's Qualification - Subdivision 2
Sunday, August 10, 2008	17:00 - 18:30	Women's Qualification - Subdivision 3
Sunday, August 10, 2008	20:00 - 21:30	Women's Qualification - Subdivision 4
Tuesday, August 12, 2008	10:00 - 12:30	Men's Team Final
Wednesday, August 13, 2008	10:30 - 12:00	Women's Team Final
Thursday, August 14, 2008	11:00 - 13:30	Men's Individual All-Around Final
Friday, August 15, 2008	11:15 - 13:00	Women's Individual All-Around Final
Sunday, August 17, 2008	18:00 - 18:30	Men's Floor Exercise Final
Sunday, August 17, 2008	18:46 - 19:15	Women's Vault Final
Sunday, August 17, 2008	19:33 - 20:00	Men's Pommel Horse Final
Sunday, August 17, 2008	20:19 - 20:45	Women's Floor Exercise Final
Monday, August 18, 2008	18:00 - 18:30	Men's Rings Final
Monday, August 18, 2008	18:46 - 19:15	Women's Uneven Bars Final
Monday, August 18, 2008	19:33 - 20:00	Men's Vault Final
Tuesday, August 19, 2008	18:00 - 18:30	Men's Parallel Bars Final
Tuesday, August 19, 2008	18:46 - 19:15	Women's Balance Beam Final
Tuesday, August 19, 2008	19:33 - 20:00	Men's Horizontal Bar Final

=== Rhythmic gymnastics ===
Date	Time	Event
Thursday, August 21, 2008	18:00 - 20:30	Individual All-Around Qualification
Thursday, August 21, 2008	20:30 - 21:30	Group All-Around Qualification
Friday, August 22, 2008	18:00 - 20:30	Individual All-Around Qualification
Friday, August 22, 2008	20:30 - 21:30	Group All-Around Qualification
Saturday, August 23, 2008	18:00 - 20:00	Individual All-Around Final
Sunday, August 24, 2008	11:00 - 12:15	Group All-Around Final

== Medal summary ==
=== Artistic gymnastics ===
==== Men's events ====
Games	Gold	Silver	Bronze
Team all-around	China; Chen Yibing; Huang Xu; Li Xiaopeng; Xiao Qin; Yang Wei; Zou Kai	Japan; Takehiro Kashima; Takuya Nakase; Makoto Okiguchi; Koki Sakamoto; Hiroyuki Tomita; Kōhei Uchimura	United States; Alexander Artemev; Raj Bhavsar; Joseph Hagerty; Jonathan Horton; Justin Spring; Kai Wen Tan
Individual all-around	Yang Wei; China	Kōhei Uchimura; Japan	Benoît Caranobe; France
Floor exercise	Zou Kai; China	Gervasio Deferr; Spain	Anton Golotsutskov; Russia
Pommel horse	Xiao Qin; China	Filip Ude; Croatia	Louis Smith; Great Britain
Rings	Chen Yibing; China	Yang Wei; China	Oleksandr Vorobiov; Ukraine
Vault	Leszek Blanik; Poland	Thomas Bouhail; France	Anton Golotsutskov; Russia
Parallel bars	Li Xiaopeng; China	Yoo Won-chul; South Korea	Anton Fokin; Uzbekistan
Horizontal bar	Zou Kai; China	Jonathan Horton; United States	Fabian Hambüchen; Germany

==== Women's events ====
Games	Gold	Silver	Bronze
Team all-around	China; Cheng Fei; Deng Linlin; He Kexin; Jiang Yuyuan; Li Shanshan; Yang Yilin	United States; Shawn Johnson; Nastia Liukin; Chellsie Memmel; Samantha Peszek; Alicia Sacramone; Bridget Sloan	Romania; Andreea Acatrinei; Gabriela Drăgoi; Andreea Grigore; Sandra Izbașa; Steliana Nistor; Anamaria Tămârjan
Individual all-around	Nastia Liukin; United States	Shawn Johnson; United States	Yang Yilin; China
Vault	Hong Un Jong; North Korea	Oksana Chusovitina; Germany	Cheng Fei; China
Uneven bars	He Kexin; China	Nastia Liukin; United States	Yang Yilin; China
Balance beam	Shawn Johnson; United States	Nastia Liukin; United States	Cheng Fei; China
Floor exercise	Sandra Izbașa; Romania	Shawn Johnson; United States	Nastia Liukin; United States

=== Rhythmic gymnastics ===
Games	Gold	Silver	Bronze
Individual all-around	Yevgeniya Kanayeva; Russia	Inna Zhukova; Belarus	Anna Bessonova; Ukraine
Group all-around	Russia; Margarita Aliychuk; Anna Gavrilenko; Tatiana Gorbunova; Elena Posevina; Darya Shkurihina; Natalia Zueva	China; Cai Tongtong; Chou Tao; Lü Yuanyang; Sui Jianshuang; Sun Dan; Zhang Shuo	Belarus; Olesya Babushkina; Anastasia Ivankova; Ksenia Sankovich; Zinaida Lunina; Glafira Martinovich; Alina Tumilovich

=== Trampoline ===
Games	Gold	Silver	Bronze
Men's individual	Lu Chunlong; China	Jason Burnett; Canada	Dong Dong; China
Women's individual	He Wenna; China	Karen Cockburn; Canada	Ekaterina Khilko; Uzbekistan

=== Medal table ===
Rank	Nation	Gold	Silver	Bronze	Total
1	China	11	2	5	18
2	United States	2	6	2	10
3	Russia	2	0	2	4
4	Romania	1	0	1	2
5	North Korea	1	0	0	1
5	Poland	1	0	0	1
7	Canada	0	2	0	2
7	Japan	0	2	0	2
9	Belarus	0	1	1	2
9	France	0	1	1	2
9	Germany	0	1	1	2
12	Croatia	0	1	0	1
12	South Korea	0	1	0	1
12	Spain	0	1	0	1
15	Ukraine	0	0	2	2
15	Uzbekistan	0	0	2	2
17	Great Britain	0	0	1	1
Totals (17 entries)		18	18	18	54

== Champions Gala ==
The traditional Gymnastics Champions Gala took place on August 20 at the National Indoor Stadium. Participants are mainly selected from the 2008 Olympic trampoline and artistic gymnastics, as well as medalists from world championships. In addition, some Chinese pop stars appeared in the Gala.

The performances included Olympic disciplines such as floor exercise, pommel horse, rings, parallel bars, horizontal bar, uneven bars, balance beam, rhythmic gymnastics and trampoline gymnastics; non-Olympic discipline such as tumbling and acrobatic; and art performances such as dancing, martial art, instrument performance and chorus.

== Age controversies ==
=== China ===
On August 21, 2008, the IOC instructed the International Gymnastics Federation (FIG) to investigate allegations that Chinese gymnast He Kexin was underaged and therefore ineligible to compete during the Olympic gymnastics competition. The FIG requires that all gymnasts be at least 16 years of age in the Olympic calendar year. The IOC had initially accepted the ages of all the Chinese participants, but newly uncovered documents suggested He was 14 years old, and thus ineligible to compete.

The investigation was initiated after an American blogger reported on a cached official Excel spreadsheet showing He's birthday as January 1, 1994. His discoveries support earlier reports from The New York Times and other bloggers regarding He's age discrepancy. Earlier, several bloggers found links to news stories and photo captions from 2007 and early 2008, including stories in the state-run Xinhua news service, that cited He's age as 13.

On October 1, 2008, the FIG ended their investigation and concluded that He and her teammates from the 2008 Olympic games were old enough to compete. This ruling confirmed the FIG's initial conclusions. Though some media outlets have voiced doubts about the decision, the gymnasts have been cleared by the FIG of any wrongdoing.

=== North Korea ===
In 2014, North Korean female gymnast Cha Yong-hwa was the subject of a disciplinary hearing because of a false passport used to falsify her age. The FIG decided to withdraw her license and nullify all her results, including the results from the 2008 Olympics.

== See also ==
- Concerns and controversies at the 2008 Summer Olympics
- Gymnastics at the 2006 Asian Games
- Gymnastics at the 2006 Commonwealth Games
- Gymnastics at the 2007 Pan American Games
- 2007 World Artistic Gymnastics Championships
- Underage Gymnasts Controversy at 2008 Summer Olympics
