= Maryia Poplyko =

Belarusian gymnast (born 1984)

- Марыя Уладзіміраўна Поплыко
- Full name: Maryia Uladzimirauna Poplyko
- Born: January 15, 1986 (age 40) Babruysk, Byelorussian SSR, Soviet Union

Gymnastics career
- Discipline: Rhythmic gymnastics
- Country represented: Belarus (1994-2004)
- Club: SK FPB Minsk
- Head coach: Irina Leparskaya
- Assistant coach: Natalia Shmakova
- Former coaches: L. E. Bondareva (1994-1997), L. G. Lukyanenko (1997-2000), I. F. Lagunova, T. E. Nenasheva (since 2000)
- Choreographer: Halina Ryzhankova
- Retired: yes
Medal record
Rhythmic gymnastics
Representing Belarus
Event	1st	2nd	3rd
FIG World Cup	0	3	2
Total	0	3	2
World Championships
Silver medal – second place	2002 New Orleans	All-Around
Bronze medal – third place	2002 New Orleans	3 Ropes + 2 Balls
Bronze medal – third place	2003 Budapest	All-Around
European Championships
Gold medal – first place	2001 Geneva	All-Around
Bronze medal – third place	2003 Riesa	5 Ribbons
Bronze medal – third place	2001 Geneva	3 Ropes + 2 Balls

Maryia Uladzimirauna Poplyko (born 15 January 1986) is a retired Belarusian rhythmic gymnast. She's a World and European Championships medalist.

== Biography ==
Since 1994 Maryia has been an athlete of the national team of Belarus. In 2000 she was granted the title of Master of Sports and, since 2002, Master of Sports of International Class. She graduated from the Republican School of Olympic Reserve in 2002.

In July 2002 she helped the group win silver in the All-Around and bronze with 3 ropes and 2 balls at the World Championships in New Orleans.

She then competed in the 2003 European Championships in Riesa, where she won bronze in the 5 ribbons final. In September of the same year the group won bronze in the All-Around at the World Championships in Budapest and thus qualifying for the following year's Olympics.

In 2004 the group won 3 silver and 2 bronze medals in the 2003-2004 World Cup circuit. At the Olympic Games in Athens Poplyko, Zlatislava Nersesyan, Yenia Burlo, Glafira Martinovich, Galina Nikandrova and Nataliya Aleksandrova took 6th place in the preliminaries and were 4th in the final, being just 0.600 points away from the bronze medal.
