= Galina Nikandrova =

Belarusian gymnast (born 1987)

- Галіна Андрэеўна Нiкандрова
- Full name: Galina Andreyevna Nikandrova
- Born: September 9, 1987 (age 38) Novopolotsk, Belarus

Gymnastics career
- Discipline: Rhythmic gymnastics
- Country represented: Belarus (2003-2004)
- Club: RTsFVS Navopolotsk
- Head coach: Irina Leparskaya
- Assistant coach: Natalia Shmakova
- Choreographer: Halina Ryzhankova
- Retired: yes
Medal record
Rhythmic gymnastics
Representing Belarus
Event	1st	2nd	3rd
FIG World Cup	0	3	2
Total	0	3	2
European Championships
Bronze medal – third place	2003 Riesa	5 Ribbons

Galina Andreyevna Nikandrova (born 9 September 1987) is a retired Belarusian rhythmic gymnast. She's a European Championships and World Cup medalist.

== Biography ==
Galina took up rhythmic gymnastics at the Youth Sports School-1 GORONO, training under Tatyana Krivko. At the 2003 European Championships in Riesa, Galina helped the national group win bronze in the 5 ribbons final.

In 2004 the group won 3 silver and 2 bronze medals in the 2003–2004 World Cup circuit. At the Olympic Games in Athens Nikandrova, Zlatislava Nersesyan, Yenia Burlo, Glafira Martinovich, Nataliya Aleksandrova and Maryia Poplyko took 6th place in the preliminaries and were 4th in the final, being just 0.600 points away from the bronze medal.

Nikadrova has been declared a Masters of sports of international class.
