= Gymnastics at the 2006 Asian Games – Women's rhythmic team =

Women's team at the 2006 Asian Games
- Venue: Aspire Hall 2
- Date: 9 December 2006
- Competitors: 33 from 10 nations

Medalists
gold medal	Kazakhstan; Aidana Kauldasheva, Aliya Yussupova, Maiya Zainullina
silver medal	Japan; Yukari Murata, Sayaka Nakano, Yuria Onuki, Ai Yokochi
bronze medal	China; Ding Yidan, Li Hongyang, Liang Yuting, Xiao Yiming

The women's rhythmic team competition at the 2006 Asian Games in Doha, Qatar was held on 9 December 2006 at the Aspire Hall 2.

== Schedule ==
All times are Arabia Standard Time (UTC+03:00)

Date	Time	Event
Saturday, 9 December 2006	13:00	Final

== Results ==
Rank	Team	Rope (rhythmic gymnastics)	Ball (rhythmic gymnastics)	Clubs (rhythmic gymnastics)	Ribbon (rhythmic gymnastics)	Total
1st place, gold medalist(s)	Kazakhstan (KAZ)	43.200	44.450	30.075	30.875	148.600
	Aidana Kauldasheva	13.400	13.625	~~13.275~~	~~12.350~~	
	Aliya Yussupova	15.275	16.625	15.975	16.200	
	Maiya Zainullina	14.525	14.200	14.100	14.675	
2nd place, silver medalist(s)	Japan (JPN)	28.825	43.925	43.425	28.575	144.750
	Yukari Murata	14.775	14.725	14.775	14.725	
	Sayaka Nakano			14.550		
	Yuria Onuki	14.050	14.475	14.100	~~13.525~~	
	Ai Yokochi	~~13.725~~	14.725		13.850	
3rd place, bronze medalist(s)	China (CHN)	28.775	43.325	28.675	42.000	142.775
	Ding Yidan	14.275	14.125	14.275	14.050	
	Li Hongyang				14.100	
	Liang Yuting	~~13.750~~	14.075	~~13.100~~	13.850	
	Xiao Yiming	14.500	15.125	14.400		
4	Malaysia (MAS)	40.900	27.425	40.825	27.400	136.550
	Foong Seow Ting	13.600	13.725	13.925	13.800	
	Jaime Lee	13.175	~~12.250~~	12.850	~~12.475~~	
	Chrystal Lim	14.125	13.700	14.050	13.600	
5	Uzbekistan (UZB)	27.025	40.675	41.925	26.725	136.350
	Olesya Ashaeva	~~12.750~~	13.200	14.000	13.300	
	Zarina Mukhitdinova	13.750	13.425	13.575	~~12.375~~	
	Djamila Rakhmatova	13.275	14.050	14.350	13.425	
6	North Korea (PRK)	27.250	40.800	26.700	37.775	132.525
	Choe Hyon-song	~~12.000~~	13.575	13.275	13.075	
	Kim Myong-hui	13.975	13.175	13.425	12.450	
	Kim Un-hwa	13.275	14.050	~~12.250~~	12.250	
7	Chinese Taipei (TPE)	38.350	27.450	26.425	39.550	131.775
	Lai Ying-tzu	13.400	14.275	13.550	13.350	
	Wu Pei-yi	12.400	13.175	~~12.000~~	12.975	
	Yu Pei-lung	12.550	~~11.600~~	12.875	13.225	
8	South Korea (KOR)	39.375	40.725	38.225	12.950	131.275
	Lee Ji-ae	12.375	12.875			
	Lee Kyung-hwa	13.975	13.450	12.350	12.950	
	Sin Un-jin	13.025	14.400	12.900	~~12.300~~	
	Yoo Seong-oeun			12.975	~~12.225~~	
9	Kyrgyzstan (KGZ)	35.625	35.200	23.700	22.900	117.425
	Avahan Bazakova	11.950	11.650	11.300	11.450	
	Violetta Ivanova	12.400	12.075	12.400	11.450	
	Alina Sabitova	11.275	11.475	~~11.075~~	~~10.825~~	
10	Mongolia (MGL)	18.400	29.625	30.000	18.425	96.450
	Töriin Bolorkhishig	9.150	10.225	10.575	9.150	
	Byambyn Bürenjargal	~~8.525~~	9.250	9.750	9.275	
	Soyoltyn Uchralt	9.250	10.150	9.675	~~8.625~~	
