= Gymnastics at the 2006 Asian Games – Women's rhythmic individual all-around =

Women's individual all-around at the 2006 Asian Games
- Venue: Aspire Hall 2
- Date: 9–10 December 2006
- Competitors: 34 from 11 nations

Medalists
gold medal	Aliya Yussupova	Kazakhstan
silver medal	Yukari Murata	Japan
bronze medal	Xiao Yiming	China

The women's rhythmic individual all-around competition at the 2006 Asian Games in Doha, Qatar was held on 9 and 10 December 2006 at the Aspire Hall 2.

== Schedule ==
All times are Arabia Standard Time (UTC+03:00)

Date	Time	Event
Saturday, 9 December 2006	13:00	Qualification
Sunday, 10 December 2006	14:30	Final

== Results ==
=== Qualification ===
Rank	Athlete	Rope (rhythmic gymnastics)	Ball (rhythmic gymnastics)	Clubs (rhythmic gymnastics)	Ribbon (rhythmic gymnastics)	Total
1	Aliya Yussupova (KAZ)	~~15.275~~	16.625	15.975	16.200	48.800
2	Yukari Murata (JPN)	14.775	~~14.725~~	14.775	14.725	44.275
3	Xiao Yiming (CHN)	14.500	15.125	14.400		44.025
4	Maiya Zainullina (KAZ)	14.525	14.200	~~14.100~~	14.675	43.400
5	Ding Yidan (CHN)	14.275	14.125	14.275	~~14.050~~	42.675
6	Yuria Onuki (JPN)	14.050	14.475	14.100	~~13.525~~	42.625
7	Ai Yokochi (JPN)	13.725	14.725		13.850	42.300
8	Chrystal Lim (MAS)	14.125	13.700	14.050	~~13.600~~	41.875
9	Djamila Rakhmatova (UZB)	~~13.275~~	14.050	14.350	13.425	41.825
10	Liang Yuting (CHN)	13.750	14.075	~~13.100~~	13.850	41.675
11	Foong Seow Ting (MAS)	~~13.600~~	13.725	13.925	13.800	41.450
12	Lai Ying-tzu (TPE)	13.400	14.275	13.550	~~13.350~~	41.225
13	Zarina Mukhitdinova (UZB)	13.750	13.425	13.575	~~12.375~~	40.750
14	Kim Myong-hui (PRK)	13.975	13.175	13.425	~~12.450~~	40.575
15	Olesya Ashaeva (UZB)	~~12.750~~	13.200	14.000	13.300	40.500
16	Lee Kyung-hwa (KOR)	13.975	13.450	~~12.350~~	12.950	40.375
17	Sin Un-jin (KOR)	13.025	14.400	12.900	~~12.300~~	40.325
18	Aidana Kauldasheva (KAZ)	13.400	13.625	13.275	~~12.350~~	40.300
19	Tharatip Sridee (THA)	~~12.100~~	14.450	13.175	12.650	40.275
20	Choe Hyon-song (PRK)	~~12.000~~	13.575	13.275	13.075	39.925
21	Kim Un-hwa (PRK)	13.275	14.050	~~12.250~~	12.250	39.575
22	Yu Pei-lung (TPE)	12.550	~~11.600~~	12.875	13.225	38.650
23	Wu Pei-yi (TPE)	12.400	13.175	~~12.000~~	12.975	38.550
24	Jaime Lee (MAS)	13.175	~~12.250~~	12.850	12.475	38.500
25	Violetta Ivanova (KGZ)	12.400	12.075	12.400	~~11.450~~	36.875
26	Avahan Bazakova (KGZ)	11.950	11.650	~~11.300~~	11.450	35.050
27	Alina Sabitova (KGZ)	11.275	11.475	11.075	~~10.825~~	33.825
28	Töriin Bolorkhishig (MGL)	~~9.150~~	10.225	10.575	9.150	29.950
29	Soyoltyn Uchralt (MGL)	9.250	10.150	9.675	~~8.625~~	29.075
30	Byambyn Bürenjargal (MGL)	~~8.525~~	9.250	9.750	9.275	28.275
31	Lee Ji-ae (KOR)	12.375	12.875			25.250
32	Yoo Seong-oeun (KOR)			12.975	12.225	25.200
33	Sayaka Nakano (JPN)			14.550		14.550
34	Li Hongyang (CHN)				14.100	14.100

=== Final ===
Rank	Athlete	Rope (rhythmic gymnastics)	Ball (rhythmic gymnastics)	Clubs (rhythmic gymnastics)	Ribbon (rhythmic gymnastics)	Total
1st place, gold medalist(s)	Aliya Yussupova (KAZ)	15.400	16.500	15.825	16.200	63.925
2nd place, silver medalist(s)	Yukari Murata (JPN)	14.700	14.750	15.000	14.675	59.125
3rd place, bronze medalist(s)	Xiao Yiming (CHN)	14.950	15.550	14.875	13.150	58.525
4	Ding Yidan (CHN)	14.975	14.625	14.950	13.825	58.375
5	Djamila Rakhmatova (UZB)	14.250	14.750	13.725	13.775	56.500
6	Maiya Zainullina (KAZ)	13.725	14.175	13.950	14.300	56.150
7	Yuria Onuki (JPN)	14.500	13.200	14.025	14.375	56.100
8	Chrystal Lim (MAS)	14.200	14.225	13.675	13.000	55.100
9	Zarina Mukhitdinova (UZB)	12.925	14.450	13.650	13.425	54.450
10	Foong Seow Ting (MAS)	13.600	13.600	13.850	13.075	54.125
11	Lee Kyung-hwa (KOR)	13.750	13.975	13.550	12.500	53.775
12	Lai Ying-tzu (TPE)	13.200	14.075	13.600	12.900	53.775
13	Kim Myong-hui (PRK)	13.800	13.075	13.725	12.700	53.300
14	Sin Un-jin (KOR)	13.125	13.900	13.125	12.575	52.725
15	Choe Hyon-song (PRK)	12.650	14.050	12.775	12.650	52.125
16	Yu Pei-lung (TPE)	12.950	13.525	12.700	12.725	51.900
17	Tharatip Sridee (THA)	11.450	14.075	12.725	12.475	50.725
18	Violetta Ivanova (KGZ)	13.050	12.625	12.150	12.325	50.150
19	Avahan Bazakova (KGZ)	11.725	11.950	11.525	11.150	46.350
20	Töriin Bolorkhishig (MGL)	10.075	10.150	9.725	8.700	38.650
21	Soyoltyn Uchralt (MGL)	9.400	9.825	9.500	8.850	37.055
