= Zlatislava Nersesyan =

Belarusian rhythmic gymnast

Zatislava Nersesyan
- Full name: Zlatislava Vladimirovna Nersesyan
- Born: July 31, 1984 (age 42) Krasnodar, Soviet Union

Gymnastics career
- Discipline: Rhythmic gymnastics
- Country represented: Belarus; (2003-2004)
- Club: FK Dinamo Minsk
- Head coach: Irina Leparskaya
- Assistant coach: Natalia Shmakova
- Choreographer: Halina Ryzhankova
- Retired: yes
Medal record
Rhythmic gymnastics
Representing Belarus
World Championships
Bronze medal – third place	2003 Budapest	All-Around
European Championships
Bronze medal – third place	2003 Riesa	5 Ribbons

Zlatislava Vladimirovna Nersesyan (born 31 July 1984) is a Belarusian rhythmic gymnast of Russian and Armenian descent. She is a medalist at the World and European Championships.

== Biography ==
Zlatislava took up gymnastics while she went to kindergarten in Krasnodar, during primary school she also started to attend a music school. After her prom, her coach offered her to go to Minsk to enter the national team of Belarus, like Zlata's friend Inna Zhukova.

As a part of the senior group she competed in the 2003 European Championships in Riesa, where she won bronze in the 5 ribbons final. In September of the same year the group won bronze in the All-Around at the World Championships in Budapest and thus qualifying for the following year's Olympics.

At the 2004 Olympic Games in Athens, Nersesyan, Nataliya Aleksandrova, Yenia Burlo, Glafira Martinovich, Galina Nikandrova, and Maryia Poplyko took 6th place in the preliminaries and were 4th in the final, being just 0.600 points away from the bronze medal.

Zatislava retired after the Games. She then studied English and became an international judge for rhythmic gymnastics, graduating from the Belarusian State University of Physical Culture. As of 2010 works at the Reupublican Center for Physical Education and Sports of Pupils and Students. In 2009 she participated in the second season of the Belarusian version of Dancing With the Stars, replacing Inna Zhukova who was injured. In recent years she also appeared in two TV shows.
