= Fabrizia D'Ottavio =

Italian rhythmic gymnast

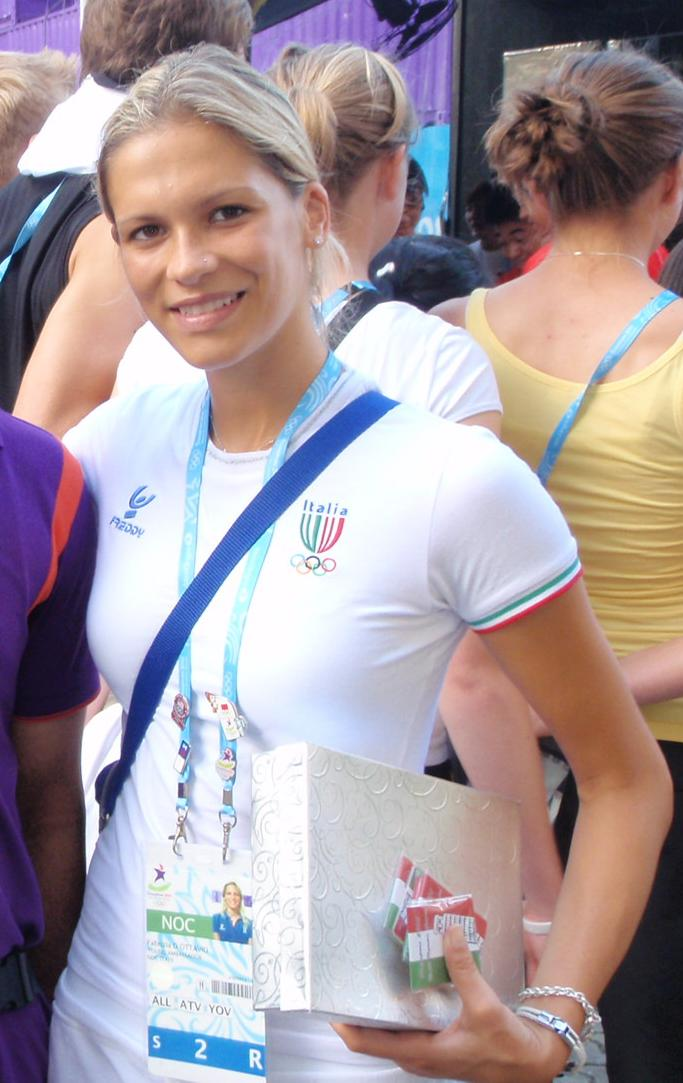
- D'Ottavio at the Youth Olympic Village of the Singapore 2010 Youth Olympic Games.

Personal information
- Full name: Fabrizia D'Ottavio
- Nationality: Italy
- Born: 3 February 1985 (age 41) Chieti, Abruzzo
- Height: 172 cm (5 ft 8 in)
- Weight: 45 kg (99 lb)

Sport
- Country: Italy
- Sport: Rhythmic gymnastics
- Coached by: Emanuela Maccarani
- Retired: 2008
Medal record
Olympic Games
Silver medal – second place	2004 Athens	Group all-around
World Championships
Gold medal – first place	2005 Baku	3 Hoops / 4 Clubs
Silver medal – second place	2007 Patras	Group All-around
Silver medal – second place	2007 Patras	5 Ropes
Silver medal – second place	2007 Patras	3 Hoops / 4 Clubs
Silver medal – second place	2005 Baku	Group All-around
Silver medal – second place	2005 Baku	5 Ribbons
Bronze medal – third place	2003 Budapest	5 Ribbons
Bronze medal – third place	2003 Budapest	3 Hoops / 2 Balls
European Championships
Gold medal – first place	2008 Torino	5 Ropes
Silver medal – second place	2008 Torino	3 Hoops & 4 Clubs
Silver medal – second place	2006 Moscow	Group all-around
Silver medal – second place	2006 Moscow	3 Hoops & 4 Clubs
Bronze medal – third place	2008 Torino	Group all-around
Bronze medal – third place	2006 Moscow	5 Ribbons

Fabrizia D'Ottavio (born 3 February 1985) is an Italian former rhythmic gymnast. She started doing gymnastics when she was five years old. In 2002, she was selected for the national team and the very next year she debuted in an international tournament.

== Biography ==
She was coached by gymnast and world champion Emanuela Maccarani. She won the silver medal in the competition of rhythmic gymnastics group at Athens Olympics in 2004. She won the gold medal of World Rhythmic Gymnastics Championships in Baku (Azerbaijan) in 2005 and silver medal at European Championships in Rhythmic Gymnastics of Moscow (Russia) in 2006. In 2008, after Beijing Olympics she announced her retirement from the national team, along with teammate Marinella Falca. In June 2009, Fabrizia was appointed as the mayor of the Village Mediterranean Chieti, for Mediterranean Games.

On 27 September 2004 she was honoured with the title Official Order of Merit of the Italian Republic initiated by the President of the Republic. In 2010 she was appointed as Italy's young ambassador to Singapore for the Inaugural Youth Olympic games.
