= 2007 World Rhythmic Gymnastics Championships =

Gymnastics contest

2007 Rhythmic Gymnastics World Championships
- Venue: National Sports Centre
- Location: Patras, Greece
- Start date: 19 September 2007
- End date: 23 September 2007

The XXVIII World Rhythmic Gymnastics Championships were held in Patras, Greece, September 19–23, 2007, at the National Sports Centre.

== Medal winners ==
Event	Gold	Silver	Bronze
Team Competition
Team	Russia; Alina Kabaeva; Vera Sessina; Olga Kapranova; Yevgeniya Kanayeva	Belarus; Inna Zhukova; Svetlana Rudalova; Liubov Charkashyna	Azerbaijan; Zeynab Javadli; Dinara Gimatova; Anna Gurbanova; Aliya Garayeva
Individual Finals
Rope	Vera Sessina (RUS)	Olga Kapranova (RUS)	Inna Zhukova (BLR)
Hoop	Olga Kapranova (RUS)	Vera Sessina (RUS)	Anna Bessonova (UKR)
Clubs	Olga Kapranova (RUS)	Anna Bessonova (UKR)	Vera Sessina (RUS)
Ribbon	Vera Sessina (RUS)	Anna Bessonova (UKR)	Alina Kabaeva (RUS)
All-Around	Anna Bessonova (UKR)	Vera Sessina (RUS)	Olga Kapranova (RUS)
Groups Finals
All-Around	Russia; Margarita Aliychuk; Anna Gavrilenko; Tatiana Gorbunova; Elena Posevina; Daria Shkurikhina; Natalia Zueva	Italy; Elisa Blanchi; Fabrizia D'Ottavio; Marinella Falca; Daniela Masseroni; Elisa Santoni; Anzhelika Savrayuk	Belarus; Alesia Babushkina; Vera Davidovich; Dzina Haitsiukevich; Hlafira Martsinovich; Kseniya Sankovich; Alina Tumilovich
5 Ropes	Russia; Margarita Aliychuk*; Anna Gavrilenko; Tatiana Gorbunova; Elena Posevina; Daria Shkurikhina; Natalia Zueva	Italy; Elisa Blanchi; Fabrizia D'Ottavio; Marinella Falca*; Daniela Masseroni; Elisa Santoni; Anzhelika Savrayuk	Bulgaria; Tzveta Kousseva; Yolita Manolova; Zornitsa Marinova; Maya Paunovska; Ioanna Tantcheva*; Tatyana Tongova
3 Hoops + 2 Clubs	Russia; Margarita Aliychuk; Anna Gavrilenko*; Tatiana Gorbunova; Elena Posevina; Daria Shkurikhina; Natalia Zueva	Italy; Elisa Blanchi; Fabrizia D'Ottavio; Marinella Falca; Daniela Masseroni; Elisa Santoni; Anzhelika Savrayuk*	Bulgaria; Tzveta Kousseva; Yolita Manolova*; Zornitsa Marinova; Maya Paunovska; Ioanna Tantcheva; Tatyana Tongova

* reserve gymnast

== Individual ==
=== Team ===
Place	Nation	Total
1	Russia	183.050
2	Belarus	168.775
3	Azerbaijan	163.750
4	Bulgaria	158.175
5	Israel	155.325
6	Kazakhstan	154.775
7	Italy	151.100
8	China	150.400
9	Georgia	149.750
10	Japan	149.725
11	Greece	149.675
12	Korea	149.075

=== Qualification ===
Place	Nation	Name	Rope	Hoop	Clubs	Ribbon	Total
1	(Russia)	Olga Kapranova	18.550 (1)	18.350 (1)	18.550 (1)		55.450
2	(Russia)	Vera Sessina	18.350 (2)	18.075 (3)	18.300 (2)	18.475 (1)	55.125
3	(Ukraine)	Anna Bessonova	17.575 (5)	18.350 (2)	16.900 (5)	18.100 (3)	54.025
4	(Russia)	Alina Kabaeva	17.950 (3)	16.675 (8)	16.800 (7)	18.350 (2)	53.100
5	(Belarus)	Inna Zhukova	17.900 (4)	17.425 (4)	17.750 (3)	17.400 (5)	53.075
6	(Azerbaijan)	Aliya Garayeva	16.350 (7)	16.775 (7)	17.550 (4)	16.275 (14)	50.675
7	(Kazakhstan)	Aliya Yusupova	15.350 (24)	16.925 (5)	16.900 (6)	16.675 (8)	50.500
8	(Israel)	Irina Risenson	16.750 (6)	15.725 (18)	16.375 (9)	16.600 (9)	49.725
9	(Bulgaria)	Simona Peycheva	16.200 (9)	16.825 (6)	15.975 (15)	16.475 (12)	49.550
10	(Belarus)	Liubov Charkashyna	16.300 (8)	16.225 (12)	16.675 (8)	16.550 (11)	49.525
11	(Canada)	Alexandra Orlando	15.875 (14)	16.450 (9)	16.175 (12)	16.600 (10)	49.225
12	(Spain)	Almudena Cid	16.100 (11)	16.425 (10)	16.075 (13)	16.300 (13)	48.825
13	(Greece)	Eleni Andriola	15.775 (15)	16.200 (13)	16.325 (10)	16.000 (17)	48.525
14	(Azerbaijan)	Dinara Gimatova	15.450 (20)		16.075 (14)	17.000 (6)	48.525
15	(Azerbaijan)	Anna Gurbanova	16.200 (10)	15.850 (15)	16.225 (11)	15.000 (33)	48.275
16	(Belarus)	Svetlana Rudalova	15.450 (21)	16.400 (11)	15.675 (22)	16.150 (16)	48.225
17	(Bulgaria)	Elizabeth Paisieva	15.775 (16)	14.750 (40)	15.850 (17)	15.850 (18)	47.475
18	(Austria)	Caroline Weber	15.575 (18)	15.800 (16)	15.525 (25)	15.800 (19)	47.175
19	(Ukraine)	Irina Kovalchuk	15.150 (26)	14.800 (39)	15.825 (18)	16.200 (15)	47.175
20	(Uzbekistan)	Ulyana Trofimova	15.450 (22)	16.075 (14)	15.575 (23)	15.075 (30)	47.100
21	(Poland)	Joanna Mitrosz	15.525 (19)	15.400 (24)	15.875 (16)	15.650 (21)	47.050
22	(Israel)	Neta Rivkin	15.950 (13)	14.700 (41)	15.700 (19)	15.100 (29)	46.750
23	(South Korea)	Shin Soo-ji	14.075 (66)	15.350 (25)	15.675 (21)	15.725 (20)	46.750
24	(Georgia (country))	Mzevinari Samlikashvili	14.900 (35)	15.750 (17)	15.550 (24)	15.400 (23)	46.700
25	(Germany)	Johanna Gabor	15.025 (29)	15.700 (19)	15.700 (20)	14.675 (42)	46.425
26	(Estonia)	Irina Kikkas	15.600 (17)	15.425 (22)	15.200 (27)	15.075 (31)	46.225
27	(China)	Yiming Xiao	15.425 (23)	15.225 (28)	15.100 (29)		45.750
...							
34	(Ukraine)	Natalia Godunko	14.350 (58)		14.075 (72)	16.750 (7)	45.175
...							
123	(Russia)	Yevgeniya Kanayeva				18.100 (4)	18.100

Other competitors

- (Argentina) Anahi Sosa
- (Armenia) Ashken Mamulyan
- (Armenia) Lalit Tonoyah
- (Australia) Naazmi Johnston
- (Australia) Kimberly Mason
- (Azerbaijan) Zeynab Javadli
- (Belarus) Maria Yushkevich
- (Brazil) Angelica Kvieczynski
- (Brazil) Ana Paula Ribeiro
- (Brazil) Ana Paula Scheffer
- (Brazil) Yuca Solano
- (Bulgaria) Stela Sultanova
- (Canada) Stefanie Carew
- (Canada) Alexandra Martincek
- (Chile) Valentina Meriño
- (Chile) Catalina Ulloa
- (China) Yidan Ding
- (China) Hongyang Li
- (China) Yuting Liang
- (Cape Verde) Wania Monteiro
- (Cape Verde) Katia Oliviera
- (Cyprus) Raisa Panagiotou
- (Cyprus) Roza Maria Pantzi
- (Cyprus) Loukia Trikomiti
- (Czech Republic) Iva Mendlikova
- (Czech Republic) Monika Mickova
- (Czech Republic) Nela Radimerska
- (Spain) Loreto Achaerandio
- (Spain) Nuria Artiguez
- (Spain) Carolina Rodriguez
- (Estonia) Jana Lukjanova
- (Finland) Julia Huuhtanen
- (Finland) Maria Ringinen
- (Finland) Marleena Saresvirta
- (France) Delphine Ledoux
- (United Kingdom) Francesca Jones
- (Georgia (country)) Tatia Donadze
- (Georgia (country)) Ketevan Khatiashvili
- (Germany) Lisa Ingildeeva
- (Germany) Daria Stolbin
- (Greece) Evmorfia Dona
- (Greece) Evangelia Gkountroumpi
- (Hungary) Viktoria Soos
- (Hungary) Dora Vass
- (Israel) Ilana Brener
- (Israel) Daniel Falah
- (Italy) Julieta Cantaluppi
- (Italy) Romina Laurito
- (Italy) Beatrice Zancanaro
- (Japan) Mai Hidaka
- (Japan) Yukari Murata
- (Japan) Yuria Onuki
- (Japan) Ai Yokochi
- (Kazakhstan) Marina Petrakova
- (Kazakhstan) Maiya Zainullina
- (Kyrgyzstan) Avahan Bazakova
- (Kyrgyzstan) Violetta Ivanova
- (South Korea) Lee Kyung-hwa
- (South Korea) Sin Un-jin
- (Latvia) Yana Isakova
- (Latvia) Marina Kisluhina
- (Latvia) Yelena Meyerzone
- (Latvia) Natalia Ziveca
- (Malaysia) Seow Ting Foong
- (Malaysia) Jaime Yoke Jeng Lee
- (Malaysia) Wen Chean Lim
- (Mexico) Rut Castillo
- (Mexico) Veronica Navarro Blizzard
- (Mexico) Sofia Sanchez Velasco
- (Mexico) Cynthia Valdes Perez
- (Poland) Marta Koczkowska
- (Poland) Anna Zdun
- (Portugal) Sara Caetano
- (Portugal) Catarina Geraldes
- (Portugal) Ines Gomes
- (Portugal) Mariana Romao
- (South Africa) Sibongile Mjekula
- (South Africa) Odette Richard
- (South Africa) Stephanie Sandler
- (Slovenia) Mojca Rode
- (Slovenia) Tjasa Seme
- (Serbia) Snezana Paunic
- (Slovakia) Petra Macalova
- (Slovakia) Michaela Micikova
- (Slovakia) Katarina Vargova
- (Sweden) Therese Larsson
- (Thailand) Natnaree Chimplee
- (Thailand) Waraporn Pornsirijanya
- (Thailand) Sridee Tharatip
- (Chinese Taipei) Kuang-Tzu Ku Kou
- (Chinese Taipei) Ying-Tzu Lai
- (Chinese Taipei) Pei-Yi Wu
- (Chinese Taipei) Pei-Lung Yu
- (Turkey) Ezgi Solmaz
- (Turkey) Berfin Serdil Sutcu
- (United States) Rachel Marmer
- (United States) Lisa Wang
- (United States) Julie Zetlin
- (Uzbekistan) Zarina Mukhitdinova
- (Uzbekistan) Djamila Rahmatova

=== All-Around ===
Rank	Nation	Name	Rope (rhythmic gymnastics)	Hoop (rhythmic gymnastics)	Clubs (rhythmic gymnastics)	Ribbon (rhythmic gymnastics)	Total
1	(Ukraine)	Anna Bessonova	18.475 (1)	18.650 (1)	18.375 (1)	18.450 (2)	73.950
2	(Russia)	Vera Sessina	18.450 (2)	18.400 (2)	18.350 (2)	18.700 (1)	73.900
3	(Russia)	Olga Kapranova	17.400 (3)	17.025 (7)	18.125 (3)	18.150 (3)	70.700
4	(Belarus)	Inna Zhukova	17.100 (5)	17.250 (6)	17.725 (4)	17.100 (5)	69.175
5	(Azerbaijan)	Aliya Garayeva	17.300 (4)	17.250 (5)	16.500 (6)	17.400 (4)	68.450
6	(Kazakhstan)	Aliya Yusupova	16.925 (6)	17.800 (4)	16.825 (5)	16.325 (8)	67.875
7	(Israel)	Irina Risenson	16.650 (9)	17.000 (8)	16.475 (7)	16.100 (11)	66.225
8	(Belarus)	Liubov Charkashyna	16.525 (10)	17.050 (7)	16.275 (11)	16.200 (9)	66.050
9	(Canada)	Alexandra Orlando	16.225 (12)	16.650 (12)	16.375 (8)	16.700 (6)	65.950
10	(Bulgaria)	Simona Peycheva	16.800 (7)	16.875 (10)	15.975 (14)	16.200 (9)	65.850
11	(Spain)	Almudena Cid	16.775 (8)	17.000 (8)	16.150 (13)	15.725 (14)	65.650
12	(Greece)	Eleni Andriola	16.500 (11)	16.875 (10)	16.225 (12)	15.275 (18)	64.875
13	(Azerbaijan)	Dinara Gimatova	15.950 (13)	15.475 (22)	16.375 (8)	16.600 (7)	64.400
14	(Austria)	Caroline Weber	15.900 (14)	15.800 (17)	15.650 (17)	15.850 (12)	63.200
15	(Bulgaria)	Elizabeth Paisieva	15.800 (16)	15.575 (21)	16.350 (10)	15.450 (17)	63.175
16	(Poland)	Joanna Mitrosz	15.750 (17)	15.875 (15)	15.425 (18)	15.775 (13)	62.825
17	(South Korea)	Shin Soo-ji	15.650 (18)	16.300 (13)	15.050 (20)	15.700 (15)	62.700
18	(Estonia)	Irina Kikkas	15.500 (20)	16.200 (14)	15.275 (19)	15.650 (16)	62.625
19	(Ukraine)	Irina Kovalchuk	15.850 (15)	15.825 (16)	15.950 (15)	14.850 (22)	62.475
20	(Israel)	Neta Rivkin	15.475 (21)	15.725 (18)	15.950 (15)	15.000 (21)	62.150
21	(Uzbekistan)	Ulyana Trofimova	15.075 (22)	15.675 (19)	14.875 (22)	15.250 (19)	60.875
22	(Germany)	Johanna Gabor	13.850 (24)	15.650 (20)	14.975 (20)	15.225 (20)	59.700
23	(China)	Yiming Xiao	15.625 (19)	15.450 (23)	14.400 (24)	14.125 (24)	59.600
24	(Georgia (country))	Mzevinari Samlikashvili	14.400 (23)	15.050 (24)	14.725 (23)	14.350 (23)	58.550

=== Rope ===
Place	Nation	Name	Result
1	(Russia)	Vera Sessina	18.600
2	(Russia)	Olga Kapranova	18.500
3	(Belarus)	Inna Zhukova	17.900
4	(Azerbaijan)	Aliya Garayeva	17.675
5	(Ukraine)	Anna Bessonova	17.325
6	(Bulgaria)	Simona Peycheva	16.975
7	(Belarus)	Liubov Charkashyna	16.550
8	(Israel)	Irina Risenson	16.525

=== Hoop ===
Place	Nation	Name	Result
1	(Russia)	Olga Kapranova	18.450
2	(Russia)	Vera Sessina	18.250
3	(Ukraine)	Anna Bessonova	18.175
4	(Azerbaijan)	Aliya Garayeva	16.900
5	(Bulgaria)	Simona Peycheva	16.700
6	(Kazakhstan)	Aliya Yusupova	16.450
7	(Canada)	Alexandra Orlando	16.350
8	(Belarus)	Inna Zhukova	16.100

=== Clubs ===
Place	Nation	Name	Result
1	(Russia)	Olga Kapranova	18.650
2	(Ukraine)	Anna Bessonova	18.400
3	(Russia)	Vera Sessina	18.325
4	(Belarus)	Inna Zhukova	17.675
5	(Azerbaijan)	Aliya Garayeva	17.425
6	(Israel)	Irina Risenson	16.675
7	(Kazakhstan)	Aliya Yusupova	16.625
8	(Belarus)	Liubov Charkashyna	16.500

=== Ribbon ===
Place	Nation	Name	Result
1	(Russia)	Vera Sessina	18.650
2	(Ukraine)	Anna Bessonova	18.350
3	(Russia)	Alina Kabaeva	17.225
4	(Kazakhstan)	Aliya Yusupova	17.175
5	(Belarus)	Inna Zhukova	16.950
6	(Ukraine)	Natalia Godunko	16.775
7	(Israel)	Irina Risenson	16.650
8	(Azerbaijan)	Dinara Gimatova	16.650

== Groups ==
=== Group compositions ===
- (Austria) Valentina Baldauf
- (Austria) Catherine Czak
- (Austria) Selina Poestinger
- (Austria) Katharina Reitgruber
- (Austria) Lisa Stampfl
- (Austria) Natascha Strobel
- (Azerbaijan) Anna Bitieva
- (Azerbaijan) Vafa Huseynova
- (Azerbaijan) Anastasia Makarova
- (Azerbaijan) Anastasia Prasolova
- (Azerbaijan) Alina Tryopina
- (Azerbaijan) Valeria Yegay
- (Belarus) Alesia Babushkina
- (Belarus) Vera Davidovich
- (Belarus) Dzina Haitiukevich
- (Belarus) Hlafira Martsinovich
- (Belarus) Kseniya Sankovich
- (Belarus) Alina Tumilovich
- (Brazil) Daniela Leite
- (Brazil) Tayanne Mantovaneli
- (Brazil) Luisa Marumi Matsuo
- (Brazil) Marcela Menezes
- (Brazil) Nicole Muller
- (Brazil) Natalia Sanchez
- (Bulgaria) Tzveta Kousseva
- (Bulgaria) Yolita Manolova
- (Bulgaria) Zornitsa Marinova
- (Bulgaria) Maya Paunovska
- (Bulgaria) Ioanna Tantcheva
- (Bulgaria) Tatyana Tongova
- (Canada) Kathryn De Cata
- (Canada) Alissa Hansen
- (Canada) Monika Lechowicz
- (Canada) Suzanne Lendvay
- (Canada) Brihana Mosienko
- (Canada) Roxanne Porter
- (Chile) Maria Ignacia Aguilera
- (Chile) Andrea Cargioli
- (Chile) Stephanie Belen Estrada
- (Chile) Natalia Isabel Olavarría
- (Chile) Maria Ignacia Palma
- (Chile) Karina Susana Torres
- (China) Tao Chou
- (China) Yuan-Yang Lu
- (China) Jian-Shuang Sui
- (China) Dan Sun
- (China) Shuo Zhang
- (China) Dan Zhu
- (Cuba) Yanet Comas
- (Cuba) Maydelis Delgado
- (Cuba) Rachel Kindelan
- (Cuba) Elsy Zenaide Ortiz
- (Cuba) Yeney Renovales
- (Cuba) Mirlay Sanchez
- (Spain) Barbara Gonzalez
- (Spain) Lara Gonzalez
- (Spain) Isabel Pagan
- (Spain) Ana Maria Pelaz
- (Spain) Veronica Ruiz
- (Spain) Elisabeth Salom
- (Finland) Helena Bogdan
- (Finland) Carita Gronhoelm
- (Finland) Nina Hanhela
- (Finland) Sirja Kokkonen
- (Finland) Rina Maatta
- (Finland) Vanessa Martins Lopes
- (France) Nathalie Fauquette
- (France) Julie Gournay
- (France) Clara Huet
- (France) Aurélie Lacour
- (France) Ketty Martel
- (France) Jessica Pantieri
- (Germany) Doreen Gepert
- (Germany) Samantha Kazmierczak
- (Germany) Olga Lukjanow
- (Germany) Anja Naujoks
- (Germany) Olena Novichkova
- (Germany) Annika Rejek
- (Greece) Ioanna Diamantidou
- (Greece) Dimitra Kafalidou
- (Greece) Dimitra Koutropoulou
- (Greece) Olga-Afroditi Piliaki
- (Greece) Paraskevi Plexida
- (Greece) Nikoleta Tsagari
- (Israel) Alena Dvornichenko
- (Israel) Katerina Pisetsky
- (Israel) Maria Savenkov
- (Israel) Rahel Vigdorchick
- (Israel) Veronika Vitenberg
- (Italy) Elisa Blanchi
- (Italy) Fabrizia D'Ottavio
- (Italy) Marinella Falca
- (Italy) Daniela Masseroni
- (Italy) Elisa Santoni
- (Italy) Anzhelika Savrayuk
- (Japan) Chihana Hara
- (Japan) Saori Inagaki
- (Japan) Nachi Misawa
- (Japan) Eri Takayasu
- (Japan) Kotono Tanaka
- (Japan) Honami Tsuboi
- (Kazakhstan) Diana Alzhanova
- (Kazakhstan) Valeriya Prokudina
- (Kazakhstan) Ravilya Ravikova
- (Kazakhstan) Svetlana Sedenkova
- (Kazakhstan) Dariya Simonova
- (Kazakhstan) Anastassiya Voronova
- (South Korea) Yun Hee Gim
- (South Korea) Sung-Eun Hong
- (South Korea) Soo Hyun Jeong
- (South Korea) Min-Jee Kang
- (South Korea) Hye Jin Kim
- (South Korea) Ju Hyun Kwak
- (Mexico) Blajaith Aguilar
- (Mexico) Sofia Diaz de Leon
- (Mexico) Marlenne Martinez
- (Mexico) Ana Cristina Ortega
- (Mexico) Citlaly Quinta
- (New Zealand) Catherine De Vos
- (New Zealand) Sophie Hallwright
- (New Zealand) Katie Pearce
- (New Zealand) Kate Ronaldson
- (New Zealand) Germaine Tang
- (New Zealand) Leilani Van Dieren
- (Poland) Inga Buczynska
- (Poland) Martyna Dabkowska
- (Poland) Anna Gorna
- (Poland) Malgorzata Lawrynowicz
- (Poland) Maria Podsiedlik
- (Poland) Alexandra Wojcik
- (Russia) Margarita Aliychuk
- (Russia) Anna Gavrilenko
- (Russia) Tatiana Gorbunova
- (Russia) Elena Posevina
- (Russia) Daria Shkurikhina
- (Russia) Natalia Zueva
- (Switzerland) Chantal Breitinger
- (Switzerland) Celestine Donze
- (Switzerland) Sarah Marchini
- (Switzerland) Sarah Simmen
- (Switzerland) Lisa Tacchelli
- (Switzerland) Tiziana Vonlanthen
- (Ukraine) Olena Dmytrash
- (Ukraine) Polina Kondaurova
- (Ukraine) Alina Maksimenko
- (Ukraine) Viera Perederiy
- (Ukraine) Oksana Petulko
- (Ukraine) Vita Zubchenko
- (United States) Kristian Brooks
- (United States) Stephanie Flaksman
- (United States) Krista Johnson
- (United States) Nicole Kowalik
- (United States) Marina Ljuvoja
- (United States) Michelle Wojtach
- (Venezuela) Katherin Arias Olive
- (Venezuela) Mariangel Balza Reveron
- (Venezuela) Catherine Cortez Egla
- (Venezuela) Andrea Myerston Crespo
- (Venezuela) Maria Gabriela Trompetero Vicent

=== All-Around ===
Rank	Nation	5	3 + 4	Total
1	Russia	17.650 (1)	17.450 (1)	35.100
2	Italy	17.125 (2)	17.125 (2)	34.250
3	Belarus	17.100 (3)	16.700 (4)	33.800
4	Bulgaria	16.675 (4)	16.925 (3)	33.600
5	Spain	16.075 (5)	15.825 (5)	31.900
6	Israel	16.000 (6)	15.600 (6)	31.600
7	Japan	15.625 (7)	15.350 (8)	30.975
8	Ukraine	15.400 (9)	15.400 (7)	30.800
9	China	15.375 (11)	15.025 (9)	30.400
10	Azerbaijan	15.375 (10)	14.625 (11)	30.000
11	Brazil	14.575 (14)	14.500 (12)	29.075
12	Greece	15.000 (12)	13.900 (14)	28.900
13	Germany	14.775 (13)	14.050 (13)	28.825
14	Poland	14.025 (16)	14.650 (10)	28.675
15	Switzerland	14.125 (15)	13.700 (15)	27.825
16	France	15.625 (8)	12.125 (22)	27.750
17	Canada	13.600 (18)	13.325 (22)	26.925
18	South Korea	13.750 (17)	12.850 (18)	26.600
19	Austria	13.575 (19)	12.800 (20)	26.375
20	Kazakhstan	13.225 (20)	12.850 (19)	26.075
21	Finland	12.875 (21)	12.925 (17)	25.800
22	Cuba	12.300 (24)	12.500 (21)	24.800
23	United States	12.700 (22)	12.025 (23)	24.725
24	Mexico	12.550 (23)	11.725 (24)	24.275
25	Venezuela	11.575 (25)	11.575 (25)	23.150
26	New Zealand	11.525 (26)	11.150 (26)	22.675
27	Chile	10.400 (27)	10.175 (27)	20.575

=== 5 Ropes Final ===
Place	Nation	Result
1	Russia	17.650
2	Italy	17.300
3	Bulgaria	17.075
4	Belarus	16.875
5	Israel	16.050
6	Spain	16.025
7	Japan	15.875
8	France	15.525

=== 3 Hoops + 2 Clubs Final ===
Place	Nation	Result
1	Russia	17.525
2	Italy	17.350
3	Bulgaria	16.975
4	Belarus	16.950
5	Ukraine	16.075
6	Spain	15.925
7	Israel	15.800
8	Japan	15.050

== Medal table ==
Rank	Nation	Gold	Silver	Bronze	Total
1	Russia	8	3	3	14
2	Ukraine	1	2	1	4
3	Italy	0	3	0	3
4	Belarus	0	1	2	3
5	Bulgaria	0	0	2	2
6	Azerbaijan	0	0	1	1
Totals (6 entries)		9	9	9	27
