= Colombo Dreams =

Colombo Dreams was a show performed by the University College London Sri Lankan Society on Friday 28 January and Saturday 29 January 2005 at the Bloomsbury Theatre, London and was directed by Pam Kangeyan, Thushan Dias, Marcus Ranney and Shaun Fernando.

Loosely based on the theatre production Bombay Dreams, Colombo Dreams was a hit romantic comedy grossing almost £6,000 which went to charities in aid of the Indian Ocean Tsunami relief effort in Sri Lanka. Based around the play were several contemporary and traditional dances, as well as classical orchestra, performed by members of the UCL Sri Lankan Society.

== Plot ==
Pushpakumar Pitiyapolgodagoonetillekeratneupersirisekera is just an ordinary schoolboy growing up in the remote village of Bambalasuriyaville, Sri Lanka. Like all country boys his age, when he is not at school, and when he is not getting up to mischief with his best friend, and secret admirer, Samanthi, he is obliged to help his family out on their small subsistence farm. But Pushpa is like no ordinary boy - he rejects the calls for him to go to medical school and make a life for himself... instead, Pushpa believes his haphazard, almost comic, acting skills will find him fame and fortune in the thriving(!) Sri Lankan movie industry. His chance to show his talent and make it big finally comes along when a little-known Indian director, Asoka Choudary, comes to town to find talent for his latest production - Lagaanic - a period drama/romantic comedy depicting the class oppression of the Sri Lankan village-folk by their colonial masters, resulting in a game of cricket being played by the villagers against their oppressors - on a sinking ship in the Indian Ocean.

In making the film, Pushpa becomes ensnared by the sexy allure of an Indian co-star, the famous D-grade actress Aishwarya, who exposes him to the self-obsessed and indulgent lifestyle of Bollywood stars. Samanthi, with the help of a wheeler-dealing dodgy acting Guru realises that if she wants to win Pushpa's heart, she must do the unthinkable... become a man! Leaving Pushpa in a predicament; does he follow his dreams and become just another D-grade Bollywood actor? Or is eternal love with his lifelong friend in the humbleness of village life the real dream that we secretly long for?

== Characters ==
- Pushpakumar Pitiyapolgodagoonetillekeratneupersirisekera - Sentheesan
- Samanthi - Jahnaky Suththanantha
- Aishwarya - Sharina
- Guru - Renju Mathew
- Pushpa's Dad - Paavan Gorur
- Pushpa's Mum - Anoushka Seneviratne
- Grandma/Archi - Shaun Fernando
- Uncle Sanjeev - Ben Tirunawarkarisu
- Asoka Choudary - Marcus Ranney
- Asst. Director - Shiv
- Auditioner 1 - Varuna Ayaru
- Auditioner 2 - Jay
- Sweeps The Cleaner - Harpreet Gahir
- Toiletman - Ryan Dhunnookchand
- Thushan (actor) - Thushan Dias

== Trivia ==
- The video-recorded Scene 7, filmed out and about in London, was the brainchild of Directors Shaun Fernando, Thushan Dias and Technical Director Ryan Dhunnookchand.
- The video sequence was destroyed on the night of the premiere of Colombo Dreams, but thanks to the genius of Society Treasurer/Technical Director Ryan Dhunnookchand and script-writer Thushan Dias, the sequence was digitally remastered minutes before curtains up.
- The £6,000 raised was split between two charities; "UK Association for Medical Aid to Sri Lanka" and "Vithu Trust Fund Ltd."
- Colombo Dreams was originally to be called I'm A Sri Lankan, Get Me Out Of Here!

== See also ==
- Sri Lanka
- The UCL Bloomsbury
- Bombay Dreams
- University College London
