= Daria Shkurikhina =

Russian rhythmic gymnast (born 1990)

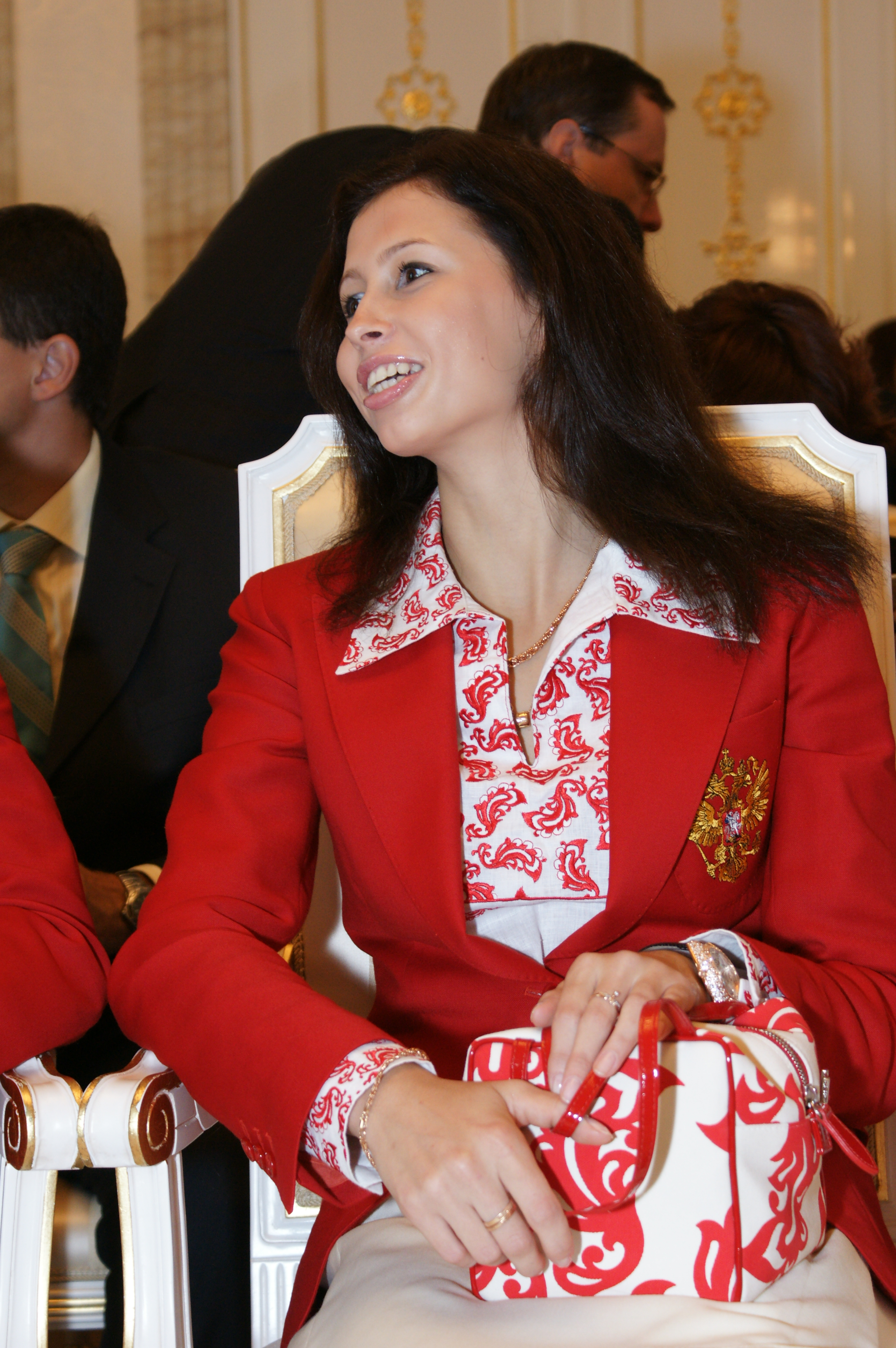

Personal information
- Full name: Daria Valeryevna Shkurikhina
- Born: 3 October 1990 (age 36) Kazan, Russian SFSR, Soviet Union
- Height: 177 cm (5 ft 10 in)

Gymnastics career
- Discipline: Rhythmic gymnastics
- Country represented: Russia
- Retired: yes
Medal record
Representing Russia
Olympic Games
Gold medal – first place	2008 Beijing	Group All-around
World Championships
Gold medal – first place	2007 Patras	Group All-around
Gold medal – first place	2007 Patras	3 Hoops + 2 Clubs
Gold medal – first place	2007 Patras	5 Ropes
European Championships
Gold medal – first place	2006 Moscow	Group All-around
Gold medal – first place	2006 Moscow	5 Ribbons
Gold medal – first place	2006 Moscow	3 Hoops + 2 Clubs
Gold medal – first place	2008 Torino	Group All-around
Gold medal – first place	2008 Torino	3 Hoops + 2 Clubs

Daria Valeryevna Shkurikhina (Russian: Дарья Валерьевна Шкурихина, born 3 October 1990) is a Russian group rhythmic gymnast. She is the 2008 Olympic group all-around champion, the 2007 World Group all-around champion and a two-time (2006, 2008) European Group all-around champion.

== Career ==
Shkurikhina was a member of the gold medal-winning Russian group at the 2007 World Championships in Patras, Greece. She also received a gold medal in the group event at the 2008 Summer Olympics in Beijing.

== Detailed Olympic results ==
Year	Competition Description	Location	Music	Apparatus	Score-Final	Score-Qualifying
2008	Olympics	Beijing		Group All-around	35.550	34.700
2008	Olympics	Beijing	Ganesh / Famous music from Bombay Dreams by A. R. Rahman	5 Ropes	17.750	17.000
2008	Olympics	Beijing	Guerrileros / Ange et Demon by Maxime Rodriguez	3 Hoops / 2 Clubs	17.800	17.700
