= Alexandra Ermakova =

Russian rhythmic gymnast (born 1992)

Aleksandra Ermakova
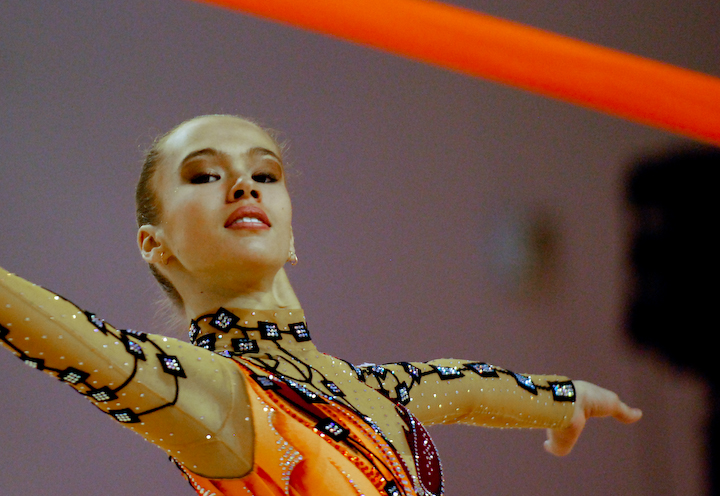
- Ermakova in 2008

Personal information
- Full name: Aleksandra Andreevna Ermakova
- Nickname: Sasha
- Born: 24 November 1992 (age 33) Russia

Gymnastics career
- Discipline: Rhythmic gymnastics
- Country represented: Russia
- Head coach: Irina Viner
- Assistant coach: Elena Karpushenko
- Retired: 2010
Medal record
Junior European Championships
Gold medal – first place	2006 Moscow	Team
Gold medal – first place	2006 Moscow	Rope

Aleksandra Andreevna Ermakova (Russian: Александра Андреевна Ермакова; born 24 November 1992) is a Russian former individual rhythmic gymnast. She won two gold medals at the 2006 Junior European Championships.

== Gymnastics career ==
=== Junior ===
Ermakova placed third in the all-around at the 2006 Junior Russian Championships and was selected for the 2006 Junior European Championships team, held in Moscow. The team of Ermakova, Ekaterina Donich, Daria Kondakova, and Natalia Pichuzhkina won the gold medal. She also won an individual gold medal in the rope final.

Ermakova won the all-around title at the 2007 Junior Russian Championships. In April, she won the junior all-around competition at the World Cup in Portimao, after finishing first with three of her four exercises (rope, ball, ribbon). She also won the junior all-around competition at the Aeon Cup in Tokyo, and she also won the team gold medal alongside Olga Kapranova and Vera Sessina.

=== Senior ===
Ermakova became age-eligible for senior competitions in 2008 and won the silver medal at the Russian Championships. She won the all-around title at the 2008 Baltic Hoop competition in Riga. At the 2009 Pesaro World Cup, she placed 11th in the all-around. She then placed fourth in the all-around at the 2009 Russian Championships. In the apparatus finals, she won silver medals with the rope, hoop, and ball and won a bronze medal with the ribbon. She then placed eighth in the all-around at the Minsk World Cup.

Ermakova retired from gymnastics in 2010 due to ongoing back issues.

== Competitive highlights ==
Year	Event	Team	AA	Hoop	Ball	Clubs	Ribb.
International
2007	Aeon Cup	1st	1st J				

== Personal life ==
After retiring from gymnastics, Ermakova began working as a coach. In 2017, she hosted a domestic rhythmic gymnastics competition in Moscow.
