= 2006 Rhythmic Gymnastics European Championships =

- Location: Moscow, Russia
- Start date: 18 September 2006
- End date: 24 September 2006

23rd Rhythmic Gymnastics European Championships were held in Moscow, Russia from 18 September to 24 September 2006.

== Medal winners ==
Event	Gold	Silver	Bronze
Senior Individual Finals
All-around	Vera Sessina; Russia	Alina Kabaeva; Russia	Anna Bessonova; Ukraine
Senior Groups Finals
All-around	Russia; Olesya Belugina; Anna Gavrilenko; Yelena Posevina; Daria Shkurikhina; Natalia Zuyeva	Italy; Elisa Blanchi; Fabrizia D'Ottavio; Marinella Falca; Francesca Pasinetti; Elisa Santoni; Matilde Spinelli	Belarus; Olesya Babushkina; Yenia Burlo; Vera Davidovich; Dzina Haitiukevich; Zinaida Lunina; Glafira Martinovich
5 ribbons	Russia; Olesya Belugina; Anna Gavrilenko; Yelena Posevina; Daria Shkurikhina; Natalia Zuyeva	Belarus; Yenia Burlo; Vera Davidovich; Dzina Haitiukevich; Zinaida Lunina; Glafira Martinovich; Olesya Babushkina*	Italy; Elisa Blanchi; Fabrizia D'Ottavio; Marinella Falca; Francesca Pasinetti; Elisa Santoni; Matilde Spinelli*
3 hoops + 2 clubs	Russia; Olesya Belugina; Anna Gavrilenko; Yelena Posevina; Daria Shkurikhina; Natalia Zuyeva	Italy; Elisa Blanchi; Fabrizia D'Ottavio; Marinella Falca; Elisa Santoni; Matilde Spinelli; Francesca Pasinetti**	Bulgaria; Tzveta Kousseva; Yolita Manolova; Maya Paunovska; Ioanna Tantcheva; Tatiana Tongova; Zornitsa Marinova**
Junior Finals
Team	Russia; Ekaterina Donich; Aleksandra Ermakova; Daria Kondakova; Natalia Pichuzhkina	Belarus; Anastasia Ivankova; Maria Yushkevich	Bulgaria; Bilyana Prodanova; Filipa Siderova
Rope	Aleksandra Ermakova; Russia	Anastasia Ivankova; Belarus	Filipa Siderova; Bulgaria
Hoop	Ekaterina Donich; Russia	Filipa Siderova; Bulgaria	Valeriya Shurkhal; Ukraine
Clubs	Natalia Pichuzhkina; Russia	Maria Yushkevich; Belarus	Daria Kushnerova; Ukraine
Ribbon	Daria Kondakova; Russia	Bilyana Prodanova; Bulgaria	Daria Kushnerova; Ukraine

* only competed in 3 hoops + 2 clubs final
** only competed in 5 ribbons final

== Results ==
=== Individual all-around ===
Rank	Gymnast	Nation	Rope (rhythmic gymnastics)	Ball (rhythmic gymnastics)	Clubs (rhythmic gymnastics)	Ribbon (rhythmic gymnastics)	Total
1st place, gold medalist(s)	Vera Sessina	Russia	17.100	17.550	17.475	17.275	69.400
2nd place, silver medalist(s)	Alina Kabaeva	Russia	16.550	17.500	17.550	17.500	69.100
3rd place, bronze medalist(s)	Anna Bessonova	Ukraine	16.975	16.675	17.125	16.825	67.600
4	Inna Zhukova	Belarus	16.400	17.325	16.950	16.850	67.525
5	Natalia Godunko	Ukraine	16.875	16.500	16.600	16.975	66.950
6	Aliya Garayeva	Azerbaijan	16.275	16.725	16.375	16.675	66.050
7	Simona Peycheva	Bulgaria	16.375	16.300	15.625	16.575	64.875
8	Liubov Charkashyna	Belarus	16.000	16.125	16.075	15.650	63.850
9	Irina Risenson	Israel	15.575	15.700	15.650	16.000	62.925
10	Anna Gurbanova	Azerbaijan	15.625	15.950	15.475	15.850	62.900
11	Elizabeth Paisieva	Bulgaria	15.425	15.825	14.950	15.375	61.575
12	Jennifer Colino	Spain	15.250	15.450	15.350	15.300	61.350
13	Eleni Andriola	Greece	14.825	14.125	14.800	14.575	58.325
14	Mojca Rode	Slovenia	14.525	14.575	14.400	14.350	57.850
15	Romina Laurito	Italy	13.875	14.725	14.700	13.900	57.200
16	Joanna Mitrosz	Poland	14.200	14.200	14.425	14.150	56.975
17	Carolina Rodriguez	Spain	13.150	14.550	13.900	13.500	55.100
18	Iva Mendlíková	Czech Republic	13.025	13.625	13.075	13.450	53.175
19	Anna Zdun	Poland	12.450	12.825	11.975	12.800	50.050
20	Evangelia Gkountroumpi	Greece	12.175	12.675	12.325	12.625	49.800

=== Group all-around ===
Rank	Nation	Ribbon (rhythmic gymnastics)	+	Total
1st place, gold medalist(s)	Russia	16.900	16.500	33.400
2nd place, silver medalist(s)	Italy	16.075	16.075	32.150
3rd place, bronze medalist(s)	Belarus	16.500	15.175	31.675
4	Bulgaria	15.225	16.100	31.325
5	Spain	14.675	14.350	29.025
6	France	14.200	14.450	28.650
7	Azerbaijan	14.025	14.500	28.525
8	Israel	13.750	14.700	28.450
9	Ukraine	13.625	14.500	28.125
10	Greece	13.425	14.600	28.025
11	Poland	13.450	13.500	26.950
12	Hungary	13.125	13.750	26.875
13	Austria	13.450	13.325	26.775
14	Finland	13.000	12.825	25.825
15	Netherlands	12.225	12.750	24.975
16	Moldova	11.475	12.775	24.250
17	Lithuania	11.500	11.975	23.475
18	Slovakia	11.750	11.175	22.925

=== Group 5 ribbons ===
Rank	Nation	D Score	A Score	E Score	Pen.	Total
1st place, gold medalist(s)	Russia	7.600	8.700	8.200		16.350
2nd place, silver medalist(s)	Belarus	7.450	8.450	8.300		16.250
3rd place, bronze medalist(s)	Italy	7.350	8.450	7.850		15.750
4	Bulgaria	6.850	7.900	7.450		14.825
5	Spain	6.400	7.700	7.700		14.750
6	Azerbaijan	6.350	7.700	7.500		14.525
7	Israel	5.450	7.600	7.400		13.925
8	France	5.800	7.600	7.050		13.750

=== Group 3 hoops + 2 clubs ===
Rank	Nation	D Score	A Score	E Score	Pen.	Total
1st place, gold medalist(s)	Russia	8.100	8.700	8.450		16.850
2nd place, silver medalist(s)	Italy	7.550	8.650	8.450		16.550
3rd place, bronze medalist(s)	Bulgaria	7.400	8.450	8.300		16.225
4	Belarus	7.250	8.400	7.850		15.675
5	Israel	6.250	7.800	8.000		15.025
6	Greece	6.300	7.600	7.950		14.900
7	Azerbaijan	6.100	7.650	7.700		14.575
8	Ukraine	7.150	7.350	7.400	0.40	14.250

== Junior Results ==
=== Team ===
Rank	Nation	Rope (rhythmic gymnastics)	Hoop (rhythmic gymnastics)	Clubs (rhythmic gymnastics)	Ribbon (rhythmic gymnastics)	Total
1st place, gold medalist(s)	Russia	24.800	24.975	24.475	24.200	98.450
2nd place, silver medalist(s)	Belarus	23.975	21.650	24.025	23.450	93.100
3rd place, bronze medalist(s)	Bulgaria	21.475	24.000	23.225	22.875	91.575
4	Ukraine	20.675	22.950	22.175	22.475	88.275
5	Romania	22.200	21.975	21.125	21.375	86.675
6	Israel	20.650	21.850	22.225	21.525	86.250
7	Italy	21.525	22.050	21.000	20.950	85.525
8	Czech Republic	21.075	21.900	21.550	20.450	84.975
9	Greece	20.150	22.150	21.075	20.875	84.250
10	Germany	20.675	21.375	21.600	20.375	84.025
11	Hungary	20.325	22.200	19.575	21.700	83.800
12	Georgia	20.675	20.375	20.525	21.300	82.875
13	Poland	20.100	21.050	21.000	20.550	82.700
14	Turkey	19.925	21.475	21.025	20.200	82.625
15	Latvia	20.375	20.050	20.575	21.150	82.150
16	Azerbaijan	20.200	21.425	21.325	18.300	81.250
17	Spain	20.100	20.550	20.175	20.200	81.025
18	France	19.275	21.050	20.550	19.625	80.500
19	Slovakia	19.875	21.000	19.650	19.775	80.300
20	Portugal	18.525	21.525	19.375	20.050	79.475
21	Austria	18.875	20.300	20.050	19.975	79.200
22	Cyprus	19.200	20.100	19.775	19.175	78.250
23	Moldova	17.825	19.575	19.750	19.900	77.050
24	Finland	19.500	19.500	19.100	18.750	76.850
25	Estonia	18.925	20.050	19.025	18.400	76.400
26	Slovenia	18.225	19.875	18.975	19.000	76.075
27	Croatia	18.550	19.250	19.475	18.675	75.950
28	Belgium	18.800	19.100	18.825	18.375	75.100
29	Great Britain	18.325	19.350	19.450	17.275	74.400
30	Lithuania	18.025	18.150	18.125	18.300	72.600
31	Serbia and Montenegro	17.925	18.225	18.525	17.150	71.825
32	Norway	16.600	18.850	18.175	17.300	70.925
33	Netherlands	-	18.075	-	17.175	35.250

=== Rope ===
Rank	Gymnast	Nation	D Score	A Score	E Score	Pen.	Total
1st place, gold medalist(s)	Aleksandra Ermakova	Russia	6.850	8.500	17.200		24.875
2nd place, silver medalist(s)	Anastasia Ivankova	Belarus	6.150	8.000	16.700		23.775
3rd place, bronze medalist(s)	Filipa Siderova	Bulgaria	5.650	7.900	16.100		22.875
4	Cristina Lautaru	Romania	5.600	7.400	15.700		22.200
5	Olga Sganzerla	Italy	5.400	7.150	15.700		21.975
6	Alina Maksymenko	Ukraine	5.750	7.450	15.300		21.900
7	Nela Radimerska	Czech Republic	4.950	7.500	14.900		21.125
8	Elena Titova	Georgia	4.950	6.800	15.100		20.975
9	Aleksandra Zapekina	Germany	4.600	7.150	14.800		20.675

*In the Qualification, Elena Titova, Aleksandra Zapekina and Alina Maksymenko were placed 7th, so they all advanced into the final.

=== Hoop ===
Rank	Gymnast	Nation	D Score	A Score	E Score	Pen.	Total
1st place, gold medalist(s)	Ekaterina Donich	Russia	6.950	8.500	17.000		24.725
2nd place, silver medalist(s)	Filipa Siderova	Bulgaria	5.950	8.050	16.900		23.900
3rd place, bronze medalist(s)	Valeriya Shurkhal	Ukraine	5.850	6.900	16.000		22.375
4	Irina Brigita Lalciu	Romania	5.650	7.200	15.900		22.325
5	Dora Vass	Hungary	5.400	7.400	15.600		22.000
6	Martina Alicata Terranova	Italy	5.150	7.250	15.800		22.000
7	Nela Radimerska	Czech Republic	5.350	7.400	15.400		21.775
8	Sophia Bacharidou	Greece	5.650	7.000	15.300		21.625

=== Clubs ===
Rank	Gymnast	Nation	D Score	A Score	E Score	Pen.	Total
1st place, gold medalist(s)	Natalia Pichuzhkina	Russia	6.850	8.550	17.100		24.800
2nd place, silver medalist(s)	Maria Yushkevich	Belarus	6.000	8.250	16.400		23.525
3rd place, bronze medalist(s)	Darya Kushnerova	Ukraine	6.600	7.800	15.900		23.100
4	Filipa Siderova	Bulgaria	5.450	8.200	16.200		23.025
5	Moran Buzovski	Israel	5.200	7.450	15.800		22.125
6	Karolina Raskina	Germany	5.450	7.350	15.600		22.000
7	Monika Mickova	Czech Republic	5.100	7.500	15.600		21.900
8	Zeynab Javadli	Azerbaijan	5.200	6.850	15.300		21.325

=== Ribbon ===
Rank	Gymnast	Nation	D Score	A Score	E Score	Pen.	Total
1st place, gold medalist(s)	Daria Kondakova	Russia	7.000	8.300	16.700		24.350
2nd place, silver medalist(s)	Bilyana Prodanova	Bulgaria	5.750	7.650	16.100		22.800
3rd place, bronze medalist(s)	Darya Kushnerova	Ukraine	6.000	8.000	15.700		22.700
4	Irina Brigita Lalciu	Romania	5.550	7.500	15.800		22.325
5	Anastasia Ivankova	Belarus	6.150	7.800	15.000		21.975
6	Dora Vass	Hungary	5.100	6.900	15.200		21.200
7	Neta Rivkin	Israel	5.000	7.150	15.000		21.075
8	Elena Titova	Georgia	5.150	7.000	14.700	0.10	20.675
