= Margarita Aliychuk =

Russian rhythmic gymnast (born 1990)

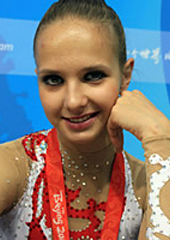

Personal information
- Full name: Margarita Sergeyevna Aliychuk
- Born: 10 August 1990 (age 36) Seversk, Tomsk Oblast, Russian SFSR, Soviet Union
- Height: 174 cm (5 ft 9 in)

Gymnastics career
- Discipline: Rhythmic gymnastics
- Country represented: Russia
- Club: Gazprom
- Head coach: Valentina Ivanitskaya
- Assistant coach: Natalia Dmitrova
- Choreographer: Vadim Zozulya
- Retired: yes
Medal record
Representing Russia
Group Rhythmic Gymnastics
Olympic Games
Gold medal – first place	2008 Beijing	Group All-around
World Championships
Gold medal – first place	2007 Patras	Group All-around
Gold medal – first place	2007 Patras	5 Ropes
Gold medal – first place	2007 Patras	3 Hoops + 2 Clubs
European Championships
Gold medal – first place	2008 Torino	Group All-around
Gold medal – first place	2008 Torino	3 Hoops + 2 Clubs

Margarita Sergeyevna Aliychuk (Russian: Маргарита Серге́евна Алийчук, born 10 August 1990) is a Russian group rhythmic gymnast and Olympic champion.

== Career ==
Aliychuk was a member of the gold medal-winning Russian group at the 2007 World Championships in Patras, Greece. She was also a member of the Russian group that competed at the 2008 Summer Olympics in Beijing where she received a gold medal in the rhythmic group competition.

== Personal life ==
Aliychuk is a resident of the city of Omsk, Russia.

== Detailed Olympic results ==
Year	Competition Description	Location	Music	Apparatus	Score-Final	Score-Qualifying
2008	Olympics	Beijing		Group All-around	35.550	34.700
2008	Olympics	Beijing	Ganesh / Famous music from Bombay Dreams by A. R. Rahman	5 Ropes	17.750	17.000
2008	Olympics	Beijing	Guerrileros / Ange et Demon by Maxime Rodriguez	3 Hoops / 2 Clubs	17.800	17.700
