= Irina Kikkas =

Estonian rhythmic gymnast

- Born: 22 July 1984 (age 42) Tallinn, then part of Estonian SSR, Soviet Union
- Height: 1.66 m (5 ft 5 1/2 in)

Gymnastics career
- Discipline: Rhythmic gymnastics
- Country represented: Estonia
- Club: Spordiklubi Velar
- Head coach: Larissa Gorbunova
- Choreographer: Vera Bondarenko

Irina Kikkas (born 22 July 1984) is an Estonian former rhythmic gymnast. She competed at the 2008 Summer Olympics and was the first Estonian rhythmic gymnast to compete at the Olympic Games.

== Early life ==
Kikkas was born on 22 July 1984 in Tallinn. Her father is an athletics coach who coached Estonian pole vaulter Valeri Bukrejev. She began rhythmic gymnastics when she was five years old.

== Gymnastics career ==
Kikkas competed at her first World Championships in 1999 and finished 49th in the all-around qualifications.

Kikkas initially finished 14th in the all-around at the 2001 World Championships. At the time, this marked Estonia's best result at the Rhythmic Gymnastics World Championships. She was moved up to 12th place after Alina Kabaeva and Irina Tchachina's medals were stripped.

Kikkas finished 17th in the all-around competition at the 2004 European Championships. She did not qualify for the 2004 Summer Olympics. She competed at the 2005 World Championships and finished 33rd in the all-around qualification round.

Kikkas qualified for the all-around final at the 2007 World Championships, finishing 18th and earning a berth for the 2008 Summer Olympics. This marked the first time an Estonian rhythmic gymnast qualified for the Olympic Games.

Kikkas finished 16th in the all-around competition at the 2008 European Championships. She then represented Estonia at the 2008 Summer Olympics. During the qualification round, she dropped both the hoop and the clubs and finished in 20th place, failing to advance to the final.

== Personal life ==
Kikkas studied for a master's degree in choreography from Tallinn University. In 2009, she started her coaching career by opening her club named “Irina Kikkas Gymnastic Club”.
