= Zarina Mukhitdinova =

Uzbekistani rhythmic gymnast

Zarina Mukhitdinova (born 19 September 1990) is a retired individual Uzbekistani rhythmic gymnast.

She participated at the 2006 Asian Games finishing 9th in the individual all-around event and 5th in the rhythmic team event together with Olesya Ashayeva and Djamila Rakhmatova, and 2005–2006 FIG Rhythmic Gymnastics World Cup series.

She competed at the 2007 World Rhythmic Gymnastics Championships.
