= Dora Vass =

Hungarian rhythmic gymnast (born 1991)

- Born: 8 September 1991 (age 35) Budapest, Hungary

Gymnastics career
- Discipline: Rhythmic gymnastics
- Country represented: Hungary
- Club: Obuda-Kalasz RG TC
- Head coach: Nóra Érfalvy
- Retired: yes

Dora Vass (born 8 September 1991) is a retired Hungarian rhythmic gymnast and coach. She represented her country in international competitions.

== Career ==
Dora took up the sport in 1999 after attending the European Championships in her native Budapest.

=== Junior ===
She entered the Hungarian national team in 2004 when she was called up to enter the junior group, with said group she took 8th place in the 2005 European Championships in Moscow. In 2006 she competed as an individual in the European Championships with hoop and ribbon, taking 5th and 6th places with the apparatuses and 11th in teams.

=== Senior ===
She became a senior in 2007 when she took 17th place at the European Championships. Selected for her maiden World Championships in 2007 she finished 37th and thus missed the qualification for the 2008 Olympic Games. In 2008 she retained the 17th place in the All-Around at the European Championships in Turin.

The following year she competed at the 2009 World Championships in Mie, finishing 24th in the All-Around, 22nd with rope, 24th with hoop, 26th with ball and 20th with ribbon. The following year she competed again at the World Championships in Moscow, she was 17th in teams, 24th in the All-Around, 28th with rope, 27th with hoop, 34th with ball and 18th with ribbon. In 2011 she took 20th place overall, 17th with hoop, 20th with ball, 22nd with clubs, 22nd with ribbon and 15th in teams at the World Championships in Montpellier.

In 2012 she competed at the qualification event for the 2012 Olympic Games, she finished in 9th place and so did not qualify. In the summer of 2013 she took part in the World Games in Cali where she was 14th with hoop and ball and 13th with clubs. In September she was selected for the 2013 World Championships in Kyiv, being 32nd in the All-Around, 32nd with hoop, 34th with ball, 27th with clubs and 66th with ribbon.

She made her 2014 debut at the World Cup in Debrecen, ending 10th in the All-Around, 15th with hoop, 10th with ball, 13th with clubs and was 8th in the ribbon final. A month later she competed at the stage in Pesaro, being 30th in the All-Around, 22nd with hoop, 29th with ball, 33rd with clubs and 35th with ribbon. In June she was selected for the European Championships in Baku where she took 19th place in the All-Around final.

In 2015 she participated at the European Championships in Minsk, she was 25th with hoop, 23rd with ball, 25th with clubs, 23rd with ribbon and 17th in teams. The following month she competed at the 1st European Games in Baku, she was 20th overall, 18th with hoop, 20th with ball, 15th with clubs and 18th with ribbon. In August she took part in two World Cup stages, in Budapest she was 27th in the All-Around, 9th with hoop, 25th with ball, 17th with clubs and 24th with ribbon, days later she was 24th in the All-Around, 26th with hoop, 27th with ball, 22nd with clubs and 23rd with ribbon in Sofia. In early September Dora was selected for the World Championships in Stuttgart, finishing 41st overall, 31st with hoop, 36th with ball, 87with clubs, 48th with ribbon and 23rd in teams along Lili Margaritisz and Boglárka Kiss.

Her last competition was the 2016 Rio Test Event where she took 22nd and did not qualify for the Olympic Games. After her retirement she works as a coach for the Philipphines' federation since 2017, one of her trainees is Breanna Labadan who's the first Filipino rhythmic gymnast to compete at the World Championships.
