= Ioanna Tantcheva =

Bulgarian rhythmic gymnast (born 1989)

- Born: 18 March 1989 (age 37)

Gymnastics career
- Discipline: Rhythmic gymnastics
- Country represented: Bulgaria (2007-2008 (?))
Medal record
Representing Bulgaria
Rhythmic gymnastics
World Championships
Bronze medal – third place	2007 Patras	5 Ropes
Bronze medal – third place	2007 Patras	3 Hoops + 4 Clubs
European Championships
Bronze medal – third place	2006 Moscow	3 Hoops + 2 Clubs

Ioanna Tantcheva (Bulgarian: Йоанна Танчева; born 18 March 1989) is a Bulgarian group rhythmic gymnast. She represents her nation at international competitions.

She participated at the 2008 Summer Olympics in Beijing. She also competed at world championships, including at the 2007 World Rhythmic Gymnastics Championships.
