= Tatiana Gorbunova =

Russian rhythmic gymnast (born 1990)

- Full name: Tatiana Igorevna Gorbunova
- Born: 23 January 1990 (age 36) Naberezhnye Chelny, Russian SFSR, Soviet Union
- Height: 176 cm (5 ft 9 in)

Gymnastics career
- Discipline: Rhythmic gymnastics
- Country represented: Russia
- Retired: yes
Medal record
Group rhythmic gymnastics
Representing Russia
Olympic Games
Gold medal – first place	2008 Beijing	Group All-around
World Championships
Gold medal – first place	2007 Patras	Group All-around
Gold medal – first place	2007 Patras	5 Ropes
Gold medal – first place	2007 Patras	3 Hoops + 2 Clubs
European Championships
Gold medal – first place	2008 Torino	Group All-around
Gold medal – first place	2008 Torino	3 Hoops + 2 Clubs

Tatiana Igorevna Gorbunova (Russian: Татьяна Игоревна Горбунова; born 23 January 1990) is a Russian rhythmic gymnast. She is the 2008 Olympic group all-around champion, the 2007 World Group all-around champion and the 2008 European Group all-around champion.

== Career ==
Gorbunova was a member of the gold medal-winning Russian group at the 2007 World Championships in Patras, Greece. She was also a member of the Russian group that competed at the 2008 Summer Olympics in Beijing and won the gold medal in the rhythmic group competition.

As of 2014, she was the executive secretary of the Russian Rhythmic Gymnastics Federation.

== Detailed Olympic results ==
Year	Competition Description	Location	Music	Apparatus	Score-Final	Score-Qualifying
2008	Olympics	Beijing		Group All-around	35.550	34.700
2008	Olympics	Beijing	Ganesh / Famous music from Bombay Dreams by A. R. Rahman	5 Ropes	17.750	17.000
2008	Olympics	Beijing	Guerrileros / Ange et Demon by Maxime Rodriguez	3 Hoops / 2 Clubs	17.800	17.700
