= Natalia Zuyeva =

Russian rhythmic gymnast (born 1988)

- Full name: Natalia Vladimirovna Zuyeva
- Born: October 10, 1988 (age 37) Belgorod, Russian SFSR, Soviet Union
- Height: 177 cm (5 ft 10 in)

Gymnastics career
- Discipline: Rhythmic gymnastics
- Country represented: Russia
- Retired: yes
Medal record
Representing Russia
Olympic Games
Gold medal – first place	2008 Beijing	Group All-around
World Championships
Gold medal – first place	2007 Patras	Group All-around
Gold medal – first place	2007 Patras	5 Ropes
Gold medal – first place	2007 Patras	3 Hoops + 2 Clubs
European Championships
Gold medal – first place	2006 Moscow	Group All-around
Gold medal – first place	2006 Moscow	5 Ribbons
Gold medal – first place	2006 Moscow	3 Hoops + 2 Clubs
Gold medal – first place	2008 Torino	Group All-around
Gold medal – first place	2008 Torino	3 Hoops + 2 Clubs

Natalia Vladimirovna Zuyeva (Russian: Наталья Владимировна Зуева; born October 10, 1988) is a Russian rhythmic gymnast. She is the 2008 Olympic group all-around champion, the 2007 World Group all-around champion and a two-time (2006, 2008) European Group all-around champion.

== Career ==
Zuyeva won gold in the group all-around at the 2006 European Rhythmic Gymnastics Championships in Moscow. She then won gold medals at the 2007 World Championships in Patras, Greece and the 2008 Summer Olympics in Beijing, China.

Zuyeva has also competed in Latin dance competitions in Russia and northern Europe.

== Personal life ==
Zuyeva lives in Belgorod.

== Detailed Olympic results ==
Year	Competition Description	Location	Music	Apparatus	Score-Final	Score-Qualifying
2008	Olympics	Beijing		Group All-around	35.550	34.700
2008	Olympics	Beijing	Ganesh / Famous music from Bombay Dreams by A. R. Rahman	5 Ropes	17.750	17.000
2008	Olympics	Beijing	Guerrileros / Ange et Demon by Maxime Rodriguez	3 Hoops / 2 Clubs	17.800	17.700
