= Tzveta Kousseva =

Bulgarian rhythmic gymnast (born 1989)

Tsveta Kousseva
- Цвета Кусева
- Born: 6 January 1989 (age 37) Sofia, Bulgaria

Gymnastics career
- Discipline: Rhythmic gymnastics
- Country represented: Bulgaria; (2006–2008)
Medal record
Representing Bulgaria
Rhythmic gymnastics
World Championships
| Bronze medal – third place | 2007 Patras | 5 Ropes |
| Bronze medal – third place | 2007 Patras | 3 Hoops + 4 Clubs |
European Championships
| Bronze medal – third place | 2008 Turin | 5 Ropes |
| Bronze medal – third place | 2006 Moscow | 3 Hoops + 2 Clubs |

Tzveta Kousseva (Bulgarian: Цвета Кусева; born 6 January 1989) is a Bulgarian former group rhythmic gymnast who now works as a fashion designer. She competed at the 2008 Summer Olympics and won medals at both the World and European Championships.

== Career ==
Kousseva began competing as a member of the national senior group in 2006. She was a member of the club CSKA.

She competed at the 2006 European Championships in Moscow, where she participated in both the 5 ribbons and 3 hoops + 2 clubs routines. The group placed 4th in the all-around and in the 5 ribbons final, and they won bronze in the mixed apparatus final.

The next year, she competed at the 2007 World Championships in Patras. There, the group placed 4th in the all-around. They went on to win the bronze medal in both event finals.

In June 2008, she competed at the European Championships in Turin, where she again competed in both the group's routines, and the group again placed 4th in the all-around. They were 5th in the mixed apparatus final, but they won the bronze medal in the 5 ropes final. In August that year, she participated in her last competition, the 2008 Summer Olympics in Beijing. The Bulgarian group qualified in 5th place, and they placed 5th in the final as well.

After finishing her gymnastics career, Kousseva studied at the University of Architecture, Civil Engineering and Geodesy and also worked as a model. She later began her own fashion brand, with her clothes inspired by her architecture studies, and she opened a boutique in Sofia.
