= Zinaida Lunina =

Belarusian rhythmic gymnast (born 1989)

- Born: 18 April 1989 (age 37) Minsk, Belarus

Gymnastics career
- Discipline: Rhythmic gymnastics
- Country represented: Belarus
Medal record
Olympic Games
Bronze medal – third place	2008 Beijing	Group all-around
World Championships
Bronze medal – third place	2005 Baku	Group all-around
Bronze medal – third place	2005 Baku	3 hoops/4 clubs
European Championships
Silver medal – second place	2006 Moscow	5 ribbons
Silver medal – second place	2008 Torino	Group all-around
Silver medal – second place	2008 Torino	5 ropes
Bronze medal – third place	2006 Moscow	Group all-around
Bronze medal – third place	2008 Torino	3 hoops/4 clubs

Zinaida Lunina (Belarusian: Зінаіда Ігараўна Луніна; Łacinka: Zinajida Iharaŭna Łunina; born 18 April 1989) is a Belarusian rhythmic gymnast. At the 2008 Summer Olympics in Beijing, she received a bronze medal in the group competition.
