= Ekaterina Donich =

Russian rhythmic gymnast

- Full name: Екатерина Владимировна Донич
- Born: 7 March 1991 (age 35) or 8 March 1991 (age 35) Astrakhan, Soviet Union

Gymnastics career
- Discipline: Rhythmic gymnastics
- Country represented: Russia

Ekaterina Donich (Russian: Екатерина Владимировна Донич; born 7 or 8 March 1991) is a Russian rhythmic gymnast.

She is the 2006 European junior team event and junior hoop champion. In the same year, she represented Russia at the Aeon Cup in Tokyo, Japan, together with Vera Sessina and Olympic champion Alina Kabaeva, winning the team gold and the individual junior all-around bronze.

On the national level, she is the 2011 Russian national all-around silver medalist, clubs silver medalist and ribbon silver medalist.

== Competitive highlights ==
Year	Event	Team	AA	Hoop	Ball	Clubs	Ribb.
International
2006	Aeon Cup	1st	3rd J				
International junior
2006	European Championships	1st J		1st J			
National
2011	Russian Championships		2nd			2nd	2nd

== In popular culture ==
She was famously featured in a TV bumper on the Russia channel.
