= Olesya Babushkina =

Belarusian rhythmic gymnast (born 1989)

- Born: 30 January 1989 (age 37) Gomel, Belarus

Gymnastics career
- Discipline: Rhythmic gymnastics
- Country represented: Belarus
Medal record
Olympic Games
| Bronze medal – third place | 2008 Beijing | Group all-around |
World Championships
| Silver medal – second place | 2009 Mie | Group all-around |
| Silver medal – second place | 2009 Mie | 3 ribbons/2 ropes |
| Bronze medal – third place | 2007 Patras | Group all-around |
| Bronze medal – third place | 2009 Mie | 5 hoops |
European Championships
| Silver medal – second place | 2006 Moscow | 5 ribbons |
| Silver medal – second place | 2008 Turin | Group all-around |
| Silver medal – second place | 2008 Turin | 5 ropes |
| Bronze medal – third place | 2006 Moscow | Group all-around |
| Bronze medal – third place | 2008 Turin | 3 hoops/4 clubs |

Olesya Babushkina (Belarusian: Алеся Аляксандраўна Бабушкіна; Łacinka: Alesia Aliaksandraŭna Babuškina; born 30 January 1989) is a Belarusian rhythmic gymnast. At the 2008 Summer Olympics in Beijing, she won a bronze medal as a member of the Belarusian group.
