= 2008 Rhythmic Gymnastics European Championships =

- Location: Turin, Italy
- Start date: 5 June 2008
- End date: 7 June 2008

24th Rhythmic Gymnastics European Championships were held in Turin, Italy from 5 June to 7 June 2008.

== Medal winners ==
| Event | Gold | Silver | Bronze |
|---|---|---|---|
Senior Individual Finals
| All-Around | Yevgeniya Kanayeva; Russia | Anna Bessonova; Ukraine | Olga Kapranova; Russia |
Senior Groups Finals
| All-Around | Russia; Margarita Aliychuk; Anna Gavrilenko; Tatiana Gorbunova; Elena Posevina; Natalia Zueva | Belarus; Alesia Babushkina; Nastassia Ivankova; Zinaida Lunina; Hlafira Martsinovich; Kseniya Sankovich; Alina Tumilovich | Italy; Elisa Blanchi; Fabrizia D'Ottavio; Marinella Falca; Daniela Masseroni; Elisa Santoni; Anzhelika Savrayuk |
| 5 ropes | Italy; Elisa Blanchi; Fabrizia D'Ottavio; Marinella Falca; Daniela Masseroni; Elisa Santoni; Anzhelika Savrayuk | Belarus; Alesia Babushkina; Nastassia Ivankova; Zinaida Lunina; Hlafira Martsinovich; Kseniya Sankovich; Alina Tumilovich | Bulgaria; Tzveta Kousseva; Yolita Manolova; Zornitsa Marinova; Maya Paunovska; Tatyana Tongova |
| 3 hoops + 2 clubs | Russia; Margarita Aliychuk; Anna Gavrilenko; Tatiana Gorbunova; Elena Posevina; Natalia Zueva | Italy; Elisa Blanchi; Fabrizia D'Ottavio; Marinella Falca; Daniela Masseroni; Elisa Santoni; Anzhelika Savrayuk | Belarus; Alesia Babushkina; Nastassia Ivankova; Zinaida Lunina; Hlafira Martsinovich; Kseniya Sankovich; Alina Tumilovich |
Junior Finals
| Team | Russia; Daria Andronova; Diana Botsieva; Daria Dmitrieva; Yana Lukonina | Belarus; Aliaksandra Narkevich; Hanna Rabtsava; Melitina Staniouta | Ukraine; Viktoria Mazur; Ganna Rizatdinova; Tatiana Zahododnya |
| Rope | Daria Andronova; Russia | Melitina Staniouta; Belarus | Tsvetelina Stoyanova; Bulgaria |
| Hoop | Aliaksandra Narkevich; Belarus | Diana Botsieva; Russia | Gabriela Kirova; Bulgaria |
| Ball | Yana Lukonina; Russia | Boyanka Angelova; Bulgaria | Hanna Rabtsava; Belarus |
| Ribbon | Daria Dmitrieva; Russia | Melitina Staniouta; Belarus | Federica Febbo; Italy |

== Senior Results ==
=== Individual all-around ===
| Rank | Gymnast | Nation | Rope (rhythmic gymnastics) | Hoop (rhythmic gymnastics) | Clubs (rhythmic gymnastics) | Ribbon (rhythmic gymnastics) | Total |
|---|---|---|---|---|---|---|---|
| 1st place, gold medalist(s) | Yevgeniya Kanayeva | Russia | 18.875 | 18.925 | 19.050 | 18.875 | 75.725 |
| 2nd place, silver medalist(s) | Anna Bessonova | Ukraine | 18.425 | 18.475 | 18.425 | 18.525 | 73.850 |
| 3rd place, bronze medalist(s) | Olga Kapranova | Russia | 18.575 | 18.700 | 18.575 | 17.525 | 73.375 |
| 4 | Inna Zhukova | Belarus | 18.575 | 18.200 | 18.400 | 18.200 | 73.375 |
| 5 | Aliya Garayeva | Azerbaijan | 17.800 | 17.800 | 18.375 | 17.825 | 71.800 |
| 6 | Natalia Godunko | Ukraine | 17.675 | 18.000 | 17.675 | 18.075 | 71.425 |
| 7 | Simona Peycheva | Bulgaria | 17.325 | 17.425 | 17.150 | 17.400 | 69.300 |
| 8 | Irina Risenson | Israel | 17.300 | 17.300 | 17.275 | 17.325 | 69.200 |
| 9 | Almudena Cid | Spain | 17.275 | 17.325 | 17.125 | 16.875 | 68.600 |
| 10 | Liubov Charkashyna | Belarus | 17.325 | 17.150 | 16.175 | 16.700 | 67.350 |
| 11 | Dinara Gimatova | Azerbaijan | 16.150 | 17.250 | 15.900 | 17.450 | 66.750 |
| 12 | Caroline Weber | Austria | 16.300 | 17.025 | 16.400 | 16.675 | 66.400 |
| 13 | Joanna Mitrosz | Poland | 16.450 | 16.800 | 16.150 | 16.725 | 66.125 |
| 14 | Neta Rivkin | Israel | 16.425 | 16.800 | 16.675 | 16.225 | 66.125 |
| 15 | Julieta Cantaluppi | Italy | 16.100 | 16.600 | 16.000 | 16.800 | 65.500 |
| 16 | Irina Kikkas | Estonia | 16.100 | 16.550 | 15.875 | 16.150 | 64.675 |
| 17 | Dora Vass | Hungary | 15.875 | 16.475 | 15.675 | 16.225 | 64.250 |
| 18 | Delphine Ledoux | France | 15.850 | 16.150 | 15.500 | 16.225 | 63.725 |
| 19 | Eleni Andriola | Greece | 14.750 | 16.450 | 15.125 | 15.550 | 61.875 |
| 20 | Mojca Rode | Slovenia | 15.750 | 15.500 | 14.825 | 15.450 | 61.525 |
| 21 | Mzevinari Samukashvili | Georgia | 14.200 | 15.500 | 15.900 | 15.350 | 60.950 |

=== Group all-around ===
| Rank | Nation | Rope (rhythmic gymnastics) | Hoop (rhythmic gymnastics) Clubs (rhythmic gymnastics) | Total |
|---|---|---|---|---|
| 1st place, gold medalist(s) | Russia | 17.725 | 17.675 | 35.400 |
| 2nd place, silver medalist(s) | Belarus | 17.325 | 17.400 | 34.725 |
| 3rd place, bronze medalist(s) | Italy | 17.200 | 17.300 | 34.500 |
| 4 | Bulgaria | 17.175 | 16.550 | 33.725 |
| 5 | Israel | 16.650 | 16.575 | 33.225 |
| 6 | Spain | 16.550 | 16.200 | 32.750 |
| 7 | Ukraine | 16.200 | 15.875 | 32.075 |
| 8 | Azerbaijan | 16.200 | 15.650 | 31.850 |
| 9 | Greece | 15.225 | 15.000 | 30.225 |
| 10 | Poland | 14.700 | 15.150 | 29.850 |
| 11 | Switzerland | 15.050 | 14.800 | 29.850 |
| 12 | Austria | 14.275 | 15.000 | 29.275 |
| 13 | Czech Republic | 14.475 | 13.800 | 28.275 |
| 14 | Georgia | 13.950 | 14.125 | 28.075 |
| 15 | Finland | 14.075 | 13.600 | 27.675 |
| 16 | Netherlands | 12.375 | 11.750 | 24.125 |

=== Group 5 ropes ===
| Rank | Nation | D Score | A Score | E Score | Pen. | Total |
|---|---|---|---|---|---|---|
| 1st place, gold medalist(s) | Italy | 8.700 | 9.050 | 8.600 | | 17.475 |
| 2nd place, silver medalist(s) | Belarus | 8.900 | 8.950 | 8.350 | | 17.275 |
| 3rd place, bronze medalist(s) | Bulgaria | 8.400 | 9.000 | 8.550 | | 17.250 |
| 4 | Spain | 8.300 | 8.650 | 8.200 | | 16.675 |
| 5 | Israel | 8.200 | 8.600 | 8.250 | | 16.650 |
| 6 | Azerbaijan | 8.000 | 8.750 | 8.250 | | 16.625 |
| 7 | Russia | 8.800 | 8.450 | 8.000 | 0.20 | 16.425 |
| 8 | Ukraine | 8.300 | 8.200 | 7.750 | | 16.000 |

=== Group 3 hoops + 2 clubs ===
| Rank | Nation | D Score | A Score | E Score | Pen. | Total |
|---|---|---|---|---|---|---|
| 1st place, gold medalist(s) | Russia | 9.200 | 9.250 | 8.700 | 0.20 | 17.725 |
| 2nd place, silver medalist(s) | Italy | 8.850 | 9.100 | 8.700 | | 17.675 |
| 3rd place, bronze medalist(s) | Belarus | 8.800 | 8.750 | 8.300 | 0.20 | 16.875 |
| 4 | Spain | 8.500 | 8.650 | 8.300 | | 16.875 |
| 5 | Bulgaria | 8.400 | 8.900 | 8.400 | 0.20 | 16.850 |
| 6 | Israel | 8.200 | 8.800 | 8.350 | | 16.850 |
| 7 | Ukraine | 8.100 | 8.550 | 8.250 | | 16.575 |
| 8 | Azerbaijan | 8.350 | 8.500 | 7.750 | 0.25 | 15.925 |

== Junior Results ==
=== Team ===
| Rank | Nation | Rope (rhythmic gymnastics) | Hoop (rhythmic gymnastics) | Ball (rhythmic gymnastics) | Ribbon (rhythmic gymnastics) | Total |
|---|---|---|---|---|---|---|
| 1st place, gold medalist(s) | Russia | 26.250 | 25.775 | 26.075 | 25.700 | 103.800 |
| 2nd place, silver medalist(s) | Belarus | 25.475 | 24.900 | 25.400 | 25.175 | 100.950 |
| 3rd place, bronze medalist(s) | Ukraine | 24.225 | 24.375 | 24.975 | 23.800 | 97.375 |
| 4 | Bulgaria | 23.975 | 24.875 | 24.625 | 23.450 | 96.925 |
| 5 | Hungary | 23.200 | 23.850 | 24.775 | 23.500 | 95.325 |
| 6 | Romania | 23.000 | 23.650 | 23.575 | 23.925 | 94.150 |
| 7 | Italy | 22.125 | 24.100 | 23.625 | 24.225 | 94.075 |
| 8 | Spain | 23.450 | 23.275 | 23.200 | 23.575 | 93.500 |
| 9 | Greece | 23.550 | 23.150 | 23.075 | 23.275 | 93.050 |
| 10 | Germany | 23.825 | 22.050 | 23.950 | 21.800 | 91.625 |
| 11 | Cyprus | 22.700 | 22.125 | 23.775 | 22.525 | 91.125 |
| 12 | Israel | 22.075 | 23.075 | 22.925 | 22.100 | 90.175 |
| 13 | Great Britain | 21.600 | 21.775 | 22.675 | 22.875 | 88.925 |
| 14 | Azerbaijan | 21.350 | 23.250 | 23.125 | 20.975 | 88.700 |
| 15 | Belgium | 22.900 | 21.275 | 21.700 | 22.425 | 88.300 |
| 16 | Poland | 21.375 | 22.300 | 21.900 | 22.275 | 87.850 |
| 17 | Latvia | 22.775 | 21.625 | 21.950 | 21.250 | 87.600 |
| 18 | Georgia | 22.250 | 22.425 | 21.300 | 21.375 | 87.350 |
| 19 | Austria | 22.375 | 20.475 | 23.200 | 21.175 | 87.225 |
| 20 | Turkey | 23.225 | 21.900 | 22.725 | 19.275 | 87.125 |
| 21 | Estonia | 21.350 | 21.050 | 22.800 | 21.500 | 86.700 |
| 22 | Finland | 22.350 | 21.025 | 21.200 | 21.600 | 86.175 |
| 23 | Slovakia | 21.625 | 21.250 | 20.875 | 20.950 | 84.700 |
| 24 | Portugal | 21.325 | 20.500 | 23.100 | 19.525 | 84.450 |
| 25 | Czech Republic | 21.850 | 21.975 | 20.600 | 19.825 | 84.250 |
| 26 | Norway | 21.475 | 19.350 | 22.100 | 20.050 | 82.975 |
| 27 | Slovenia | 20.625 | 20.275 | 21.175 | 20.125 | 82.200 |
| 28 | Sweden | 19.850 | 20.100 | 21.525 | 20.625 | 82.100 |
| 29 | France | 20.650 | 19.175 | 21.250 | 20.975 | 82.050 |
| 30 | Lithuania | 21.350 | 18.675 | 19.800 | 21.375 | 81.200 |
| 31 | Croatia | 19.400 | 20.050 | 21.050 | 19.400 | 79.900 |
| 32 | Serbia | 20.050 | 19.650 | 19.650 | 18.150 | 77.500 |
| 33 | Armenia | 18.425 | 18.100 | 17.625 | 18.150 | 72.300 |

=== Rope ===
| Rank | Gymnast | Nation | D Score | A Score | E Score | Pen. | Total |
|---|---|---|---|---|---|---|---|
| 1st place, gold medalist(s) | Daria Andronova | Russia | 7.800 | 8.800 | 18.700 | | 27.000 |
| 2nd place, silver medalist(s) | Melitina Staniouta | Belarus | 7.500 | 8.600 | 18.300 | | 26.350 |
| 3rd place, bronze medalist(s) | Tsvetelina Stoyanova | Bulgaria | 6.300 | 8.400 | 17.000 | | 24.350 |
| 4 | Tatiana Zahododnya | Ukraine | 5.550 | 8.200 | 17.200 | | 24.075 |
| 5 | Sara Radman | Germany | 5.500 | 8.100 | 17.100 | | 23.900 |
| 6 | Vasileia Zachou | Greece | 5.850 | 8.200 | 16.400 | | 23.425 |
| 7 | Gozde Ozkebapci | Turkey | 5.250 | 7.700 | 16.800 | 0.05 | 23.225 |
| 8 | Natalia Garcia Timofeeva | Spain | 5.500 | 7.900 | 16.200 | | 22.900 |

=== Hoop ===
| Rank | Gymnast | Nation | D Score | A Score | E Score | Pen. | Total |
|---|---|---|---|---|---|---|---|
| 1st place, gold medalist(s) | Aliaksandra Narkevich | Belarus | 7.150 | 8.750 | 18.100 | | 26.050 |
| 2nd place, silver medalist(s) | Diana Botsieva | Russia | 7.200 | 8.850 | 18.000 | | 26.025 |
| 3rd place, bronze medalist(s) | Gabriela Kirova | Bulgaria | 6.700 | 8.450 | 17.800 | | 25.375 |
| 4 | Ganna Rizatdinova | Ukraine | 6.700 | 8.350 | 17.200 | | 24.725 |
| 5 | Fanni Forray | Hungary | 6.700 | 8.100 | 17.100 | | 24.500 |
| 6 | Alexandra Piscupescu | Romania | 6.800 | 8.100 | 17.100 | 0.10 | 24.450 |
| 7 | Camilla Bini | Italy | 5.900 | 8.300 | 17.100 | | 24.200 |
| 8 | Rebeca Garcia | Spain | 5.400 | 7.750 | 16.000 | 0.40 | 22.175 |

=== Ball ===
| Rank | Gymnast | Nation | D Score | A Score | E Score | Pen. | Total |
|---|---|---|---|---|---|---|---|
| 1st place, gold medalist(s) | Yana Lukonina | Russia | 7.500 | 8.750 | 18.800 | 0.10 | 26.825 |
| 2nd place, silver medalist(s) | Boyanka Angelova | Bulgaria | 7.400 | 9.100 | 18.200 | 0.05 | 26.400 |
| 3rd place, bronze medalist(s) | Hanna Rabtsava | Belarus | 7.300 | 8.350 | 18.200 | | 26.025 |
| 4 | Viktoria Mazur | Ukraine | 6.200 | 8.350 | 17.300 | | 24.575 |
| 5 | Fanni Kholhoffer | Hungary | 6.700 | 8.050 | 17.000 | | 24.375 |
| 6 | Chrystalleni Trikomiti | Cyprus | 5.950 | 8.000 | 17.000 | | 23.975 |
| 7 | Alessia Marchetto | Italy | 5.200 | 8.150 | 16.800 | 0.05 | 23.425 |
| 8 | Sara Radman | Germany | 5.450 | 7.300 | 15.200 | 0.40 | 21.175 |

=== Ribbon ===
| Rank | Gymnast | Nation | D Score | A Score | E Score | Pen. | Total |
|---|---|---|---|---|---|---|---|
| 1st place, gold medalist(s) | Daria Dmitrieva | Russia | 7.500 | 9.000 | 18.300 | 0.05 | 26.500 |
| 2nd place, silver medalist(s) | Melitina Staniouta | Belarus | 7.050 | 8.600 | 17.800 | | 25.625 |
| 3rd place, bronze medalist(s) | Federica Febbo | Italy | 6.950 | 8.450 | 17.600 | | 25.300 |
| 4 | Mariya Mateva | Bulgaria | 6.600 | 8.450 | 17.400 | 0.05 | 24.875 |
| 5 | Ganna Rizatdinova | Ukraine | 6.300 | 8.200 | 17.400 | | 24.650 |
| 6 | Irina Lalciu | Romania | 6.800 | 8.000 | 17.200 | | 24.600 |
| 7 | Rebeca Garcia | Spain | 6.200 | 8.100 | 17.000 | 0.05 | 24.100 |
| 8 | Daria Topic | Hungary | 6.250 | 7.850 | 16.200 | | 23.250 |
