= Yelena Posevina =

Russian rhythmic gymnast

- Full name: Yelena Aleksandrovna Posevina
- Alternative name: Elena Posevina
- Born: 13 February 1986 (age 40) Tula, Russian SFSR, Soviet Union

Gymnastics career
- Discipline: Rhythmic gymnastics
- Country represented: Russia
- Head coach: Irina Viner
- Retired: yes
Medal record
Representing Russia
Group Rhythmic Gymnastics
Olympic Games
Gold medal – first place	2004 Athens	Group All-around
Gold medal – first place	2008 Beijing	Group All-around
World Championships
Gold medal – first place	2003 Budapest	Group All-around
Gold medal – first place	2003 Budapest	5 Ribbons
Gold medal – first place	2003 Budapest	3 Hoops + 2 Balls
Gold medal – first place	2007 Patras	Group All-around
Gold medal – first place	2007 Patras	3 Hoops + 2 Clubs
Gold medal – first place	2007 Patras	5 Ropes
European Championships
Gold medal – first place	2003 Riesa	Group All-around
Gold medal – first place	2003 Riesa	5 Ribbons
Gold medal – first place	2006 Moscow	Group All-around
Gold medal – first place	2006 Moscow	5 Ribbons
Gold medal – first place	2006 Moscow	3 Hoops + 2 Clubs
Gold medal – first place	2008 Torino	Group All-around
Gold medal – first place	2008 Torino	3 Hoops + 2 Clubs
World Cup Final
Gold medal – first place	2004 Moscow	5 Ribbons
Gold medal – first place	2004 Moscow	2 Balls + 3 Hoops

Yelena Aleksandrovna Posevina (Russian: Елена Александровна Посевина, born 13 February 1986) is a Russian former group rhythmic gymnast. She is a two-time Group Olympic champion, who attended Olympic Games on 2004 and 2008. She is a two-time (2003, 2007) World Group All-around champion and a three-time (2003, 2006, 2008) European Group All-around champion.

== Career ==
Elena Posevina was a member of the national gymnastics team from 2000. She competed at the 2004 Summer Olympics in Athens where she received a gold medal in the rhythmic group competition. In 2003 and 2007, Posevina won the World Champion title as a member of the Russian group and took European championships group title in 2003, 2006 and 2008. She was named a merited master of sports, holder of the Order of Friendship for major contribution in development of physical culture and sports, high sporting accomplishments, and holder of the Order of Honour for a contribution in development of physical culture and sports.

Posevina also won gold at the 2008 Summer Olympics in Beijing. She is the second group rhythmic gymnast to win two gold medals in the Olympic Games after Natalia Lavrova. Posevina was one of the 50 elite athletes of Russia chosen as an honorary ambassador for the 2013 Summer Universiade in Kazan.

== Personal life ==
Posevina is a resident of Nizhny Novgorod, Russia and is now working as a rhythmic gymnastics coach. Posevina graduated from the Faculty of Physical Education and Sports of Lobachevsky State University of Nizhni Novgorod in 2013. She is married since July 2017 and has one son named Harry who was born in October 2017.

== Detailed Olympic results ==
Year	Competition Description	Location	Music	Apparatus	Score-Final	Score-Qualifying
2008	Olympics	Beijing		Group All-around	35.550	34.700
2008	Olympics	Beijing	Kalinka by Alexei Martynov	5 Ropes	17.750	17.000
2008	Olympics	Beijing	Guerrileros / Ange et Demon by Maxime Rodriguez	3 Hoops / 2 Clubs	17.800	17.700

Year	Competition Description	Location	Music	Apparatus	Score-Final	Score-Qualifying
2004	Olympics	Athens		Group All-around	51.100	49.875
2004	Olympics	Athens	Mona Lisa Overdrive music from The Matrix Reloaded by Don Davis & Juno Reactor	5 Ribbons	25.300	24.700
2004	Olympics	Athens	Ironside (excerpt) / White, Crane Lightning / "Don't Let Me Be Misunderstood" music from Kill Bill by Quincy Jones / RZA / Santa Esmeralda	3 Hoops / 2 Balls	25.800	25.175
