= Xiao Yiming =

Chinese rhythmic gymnast

- Born: 21 January 1988 (age 38) China

Gymnastics career
- Discipline: Rhythmic gymnastics
- Country represented: China; (2005-2007)
Medal record
Rhythmic Gymnastics
Representing China
Asian Games
| Bronze medal – third place | 2006 Doha | Team |
| Bronze medal – third place | 2006 Doha | All-around |
Asian Championships
| Bronze medal – third place | 2006 Surat | Team |
| Bronze medal – third place | 2006 Surat | All-around |

Xiao Yiming (born 21 January 1988) is a Chinese individual rhythmic gymnast. She represents China at international competitions. She competed at the 2005 and 2007 World Rhythmic Gymnastics Championships. She had her highest placement finishing 19th in the all-around at the 2005 World Championships in Baku, Azerbaijan.
