= Li Hongyang (gymnast) =

Chinese rhythmic gymnast

- Full name: Li Hongyang
- Born: May 16, 1990 (age 36) Guilin, Guangxi
- Height: 160 cm (5 ft 3 in)

Gymnastics career
- Discipline: Rhythmic gymnastics
- Country represented: China
- Head coach: Liang Qin
Medal record
Asian Games
Bronze medal – third place	2006 Doha	Team

Li Hongyang (simplified Chinese: 李红扬; traditional Chinese: 李紅揚; pinyin: Lǐ Hóngyáng; born May 16, 1990, in Guilin, Guangxi) is a Chinese rhythmic gymnast. Li Hongyang debuted at the 2006 Chinese National Rhythmic Gymnastics Championships, where she won the championship trophy. In 2007, she won the 2007 National Championships in the individual/group, and placed 8th in the team competition at the 2007 World Rhythmic Gymnastics Championships. She represented China at the 2008 Summer Olympics. In 2009, she retired from professional rhythmic gymnastics following the 2009 Rhythmic Gymnastics World Championships.

== Rhythmic Gymnastics Career ==
=== National Championships ===
2006 Chinese National Rhythmic Gymnastics Championships (Shenyang, China)

2007 Chinese National Rhythmic Gymnastics Championships

=== World Championships ===
2007 Rhythmic Gymnastics World Championships (Patras, Greece)

2009 Rhythmic Gymnastics World Championships (Mie, Japan)

=== Olympic Games ===
2008 Summer Olympics (Beijing, China)
