= Monika Míčková =

Czech rhythmic gymnast

- Born: 29 July 1991 (age 35) Brno, Czechoslovakia

Gymnastics career
- Discipline: Rhythmic gymnastics
- Country represented: Czech Republic (2004-2016)
- Club: SK GiTY MS Brno
- Head coach: Zdenka Schinzelova
- Choreographer: Olga Mikulcova
Medal record
Representing Czech Republic
Rhythmic Gymnastics
Grand Prix Final
Silver medal – second place	2012 Brno	Ball
Bronze medal – third place	2012 Brno	All-around
Bronze medal – third place	2012 Brno	Ribbon

Monika Míčková (born 29 July 1991) is a retired Czech rhythmic gymnast. She is the 2012 Grand Prix Final All-around bronze medalist.

== Career ==
Míčková has competed 6 times at the World Championships since 2007 as an individual and group gymnast, she has also competed in the World Cup and Grand Prix series.

In 2012, the absence of most veteran rhythmic gymnasts competing in Grand Prix after the 2012 Summer Olympics. Competing in home crowd at the 2012 Grand Prix Final in Brno, she was able to win the bronze medal in all-around ahead of Azeri gymnast Lala Yusifova who finished 4th, she also won silver in ball and bronze in ribbon final. Míčková had her highest placement at the 2013 European Championships finishing 17th in the all-around. She finished 13th in all-around at the 2013 Summer Universiade in Kazan. She finished 6th in all-around at the 2014 Brno Grand Prix.

In 2016, Mickova finished 24th in the all-around at the 2016 Grand Prix Moscow. On 17–20 March Mickova then competed at the 2016 Lisboa World Cup where she finished 17th in the all-around. At the 30th Thiais Grand Prix event in Paris, she finished 19th in the all-around. On 1–3 April Mickova competed at the 2016 Pesaro World Cup where she finished 33rd in the all-around. On 6–8 May Mickova competed at the Brno Grand Prix finishing 8th in the all-around and qualified to all 4 apparatus finals. She announced her retirement on her Facebook account on 16 May.
