= Yenia Burlo =

Belarusian rhythmic gymnast (born 1988)

- Full name: Yevgeniya Gennadyevna Burlo
- Alternative name: Yavhenia Burlo
- Born: 29 May 1988 (age 38) Minsk, Belarus
- Height: 5 ft 6.5 in (169 cm)

Gymnastics career
- Discipline: Rhythmic gymnastics
- Country represented: Belarus; (2004–2006 (?))
- Club: SK FPB Minsk, Minsk (BLR)
Medal record
World Championships
Bronze medal – third place	2005 Baku	Group all-around
Bronze medal – third place	2005 Baku	3 hoops/4 clubs
European Championships
Silver medal – second place	2006 Moscow	5 Ribbons
Bronze medal – third place	2006 Moscow	Group all-around

Yevgeniya Gennadyevna "Yenia" Burlo (Евгения Геннадьевна Бурло; born 29 May 1988 in Minsk) is a Belarusian group rhythmic gymnast. She represented her nation at international competitions.

She participated at the 2004 Summer Olympics in the group all-around event finishing 4th in the final after finishing 6th in the qualification. She competed at world championships, including at the 2005 World Rhythmic Gymnastics Championships in Baku, Azerbaijan.

Today she owns a rhythmic gymnastics club in the USA called Burlo Gymnastics. It is one of the top gyms in the US and has multiple national champions and National Team members. At the 2025 Elite Qualifier, all three age categories (Hope, Junior, Senior) were topped by Burlo (Victoria Buckareva, Natalie De La Rosa and Rin Keys). Her pupils include Junior World medalist Rin Keys, and Natalie de la Rosa.
