= Glafira Martinovich =

Belarusian rhythmic gymnast (born 1989)

- Born: 4 February 1989 (age 37) Minsk, Belarus

Gymnastics career
- Discipline: Rhythmic gymnastics
- Country represented: Belarus
Medal record
Olympic Games
Bronze medal – third place	2008 Beijing	Group All-around
World Championships
Bronze medal – third place	2005 Baku	Group All-around
Bronze medal – third place	2005 Baku	3 hoops & 4 clubs
Bronze medal – third place	2007 Patras	Group All-around
European Championships
Silver medal – second place	2006 Moscow	5 ribbons
Silver medal – second place	2008 Torino	Group All-around
Silver medal – second place	2008 Torino	5 ropes
Bronze medal – third place	2006 Moscow	Group All-around
Bronze medal – third place	2008 Torino	3 hoops & 4 clubs

Glafira Martinovich (Belarusian: Глафіра Сяргееўна Марціновіч; Łacinka: Hlafira Siarhiejeŭna Marcinovič; born 4 February 1989) is a Belarusian rhythmic gymnast. She became Belarus' youngest Olympian when she competed at the 2004 Summer Olympics at the age of 15 years and 204 days. At the 2008 Summer Olympics in Beijing, she received a bronze medal in the group competition.
