= Bombay Dreams =

2002 Bollywood-themed musical

- The CD Cover for the 2002 Original London Cast Recording
- Music: A. R. Rahman
- Lyrics: Don Black
- Book: Meera Syal; Thomas Meehan
- Productions: 2002 West End; 2004 Broadway; 2006 North America tour

Bombay Dreams is a Bollywood-themed musical theatre play, with music by A. R. Rahman, lyrics by Don Black and the book by Meera Syal and Thomas Meehan, originally produced by Andrew Lloyd Webber. The London production opened in 2002 and ran for two years. The musical was later produced on Broadway in 2004.

== Plot ==
The story centers around Akaash, a young man from the slums of Bombay who dreams of becoming the next big star in Bollywood. Fate steps in when a rich lawyer and his fiancée, an aspiring documentary filmmaker, arrive to prevent the demolition of Akaash's slum. Akaash quickly falls in love with the lawyer's fiancée, Priya, who happens to be the daughter of a famous Bollywood director. Complications arise as Akaash faces the reality of show business, fame, his love for Priya, and his obligations to his family, friends, and his Paradise slum.

The story also deals with the change of name from Bombay to Mumbai and the identity issues that this raises.

== Musical numbers ==
London production

Act 1

- "Bombay Awakes" – Ensemble
- "Bombay Dreams" – Ensemble
- "Like An Eagle" – Akaash, Ensemble
- "Love's Never Easy" – Sweetie, Ensemble
  Revised version of the song "Ishq Bina" from Taal
- "Don't Release Me" – Madan, Ensemble
- "Happy Endings" – Priya, Madan
  Revised version of the song "Rangeela Re" from Rangeela
- "Ooh La La" – Anupam, Kitty, Rani
  Revised version of the song "Manna Madurai (Ooh La La La)" from Minsara Kanavu
- "Like An Eagle (Reprise)" – Akaash
- "Shakalaka Baby" – Akaash, Rani
  Revised version of the song "Shakalaka Baby" from Mudhalvan
- "Are You Sure You Want to Be Famous?" – Akaash, Rani, Ensemble
  Revised version of the song "Sona Nahi Na Sahi" from One 2 Ka 4
- "I Could Live Here" – Akaash
- "Only Love" – Priya

Act 2

- "Chaiyya Chaiyya" – Akaash, Rani, Ensemble
  Revised version of the song "Chaiyya Chaiyya" from Dil Se..
- "How Many Stars" – Priya, Akaash
- "Salaam Bombay" – Akaash, Rani, Ensemble
- "Closer Than Ever" – Sweetie, Akaash, Priya
  Revised version of the song "Nahin Samne" from Taal
- "Ganesh" – Ensemble
- "The Journey Home" – Akaash
- "Wedding Qawwali" – Vikram, Ensemble
- "Bombay Sleeps" – Akaash, Priya, Ensemble

Broadway production

Act 1

- "Salaam Bombay" – Akaash, Sweetie and Ensemble
- "Bollywood" – Akaash and Ensemble
- "Love's Never Easy" – Sweetie, Priya and Ensemble
- "Lovely, Lovely, Ladies" – Rani and Ensemble
- "Bhangra" – Akaash, Rani and Ensemble
- "Shakalaka Baby" – Rani, Akaash and Ensemble
- "I Could Live Here" – Akaash
- "Is This Love?" – Priya
- "Famous" – Madan, Rani, Akaash and Ensemble
- "Love's Never Easy (Reprise)" – Priya and Sweetie

Act 2

- "Chaiyya Chaiyya" – Akaash, Rani and Ensemble
- "How Many Stars?" – Akaash and Priya
- "Salaam Bombay (Reprise)" – Rani and Ensemble
- "Hero" – Sweetie and Priya
- "Ganesh Procession" – Ensemble
- "The Journey Home" – Akaash
- "Wedding Qawwali" – Ensemble

== Productions ==
Bombay Dreams premiered in the West End at the Apollo Victoria Theatre on 19 June 2002 and closed in June 2004. The original cast included Preeya Kalidas as Priya, Raza Jaffrey as Akaash, Ayesha Dharker as Rani, Dalip Tahil as Madan, and Ramon Tikaram as Vikram.

The musical opened on Broadway at The Broadway Theatre on 29 April 2004 and closed on 1 January 2005 after 284 performances. The director was Steven Pimlott, with choreography by Farah Khan and Anthony Van Laast, and scenic and costume design by Mark Thompson. The cast featured Manu Narayan as Akaash and Madhur Jaffrey as Shanti. The plot, format and characters of Bombay Dreams were revised several times. The book of the musical was rewritten and many songs were cut and other songs added to the show for the Broadway run.

A new production produced by Atlanta's Theater of the Stars and the Independent Presenters Association started touring North America in February 2006 at the Orange County Performing Arts Center in Costa Mesa, California.

== Reception ==
In the UK, the production grossed an estimated £5 million at London's West End theatre by March 2004, equivalent to $9.2 million. As of June 2004, the show was watched by over 1.5 million people in the United Kingdom. In the United States, the production sold 552,954 tickets and grossed $22,437,579 at the Broadway Theatre by January 2005. Combined, the production sold over 2.1 million tickets in the United Kingdom and Broadway theatre, and grossed approximately $32 million at the West End and Broadway theatres.

The Original London Cast Album, composed by A. R. Rahman, received a Gold certification and sold 250,000 units in the United Kingdom. The album was also a top-selling record in India.

== Nominations ==
- Tony Award for Best Costume Design – Mark Thompson (nominee)
- Tony Award for Best Choreography – Anthony Van Laast (nominee), Farah Khan (nominee)
- Tony Award for Best Orchestrations – Paul Bogaev (nominee)
- Drama Desk Award Outstanding Choreography (nominee)
- Drama Desk Award Outstanding Orchestrations (nominee)
- Drama Desk Award Outstanding Set Design of a Musical (nominee)
- Drama Desk Award Outstanding Costume Design (nominee)

== Film adaptation ==
On 14 May 2010, Marquee Pictures was supposed to produce a film adaptation of the musical with Deepa Mehta directing the film.
