= List of medalists at the Rhythmic Gymnastics World Championships =

This is a list of medalists at the Rhythmic Gymnastics World Championships. Bold numbers in brackets denotes record numbers of victories in corresponding disciplines.

== Individual All-Around ==
Individual All-Around Medalists
Year	Location	Gold	Silver	Bronze
1963	Budapest, Hungary	(Soviet Union) Ludmila Savinkova	(Soviet Union) Tatiana Kravtchenko	(Bulgaria) Julia Trashlieva
1965	Prague, Czechoslovakia	(Czechoslovakia) Hana Mičechová	(Soviet Union) Tatiana Kravtchenko	(Czechoslovakia) Hana Machatová-Bogušovská
1967	Copenhagen, Denmark	(Soviet Union) Elena Karpukhina	(East Germany) Ute Lehmann	(Soviet Union) Liubov Sereda
1969	Varna, Bulgaria	(Bulgaria) Maria Gigova	(Bulgaria) Neshka Robeva (Soviet Union) Liubov Sereda (Soviet Union) Galima Shugurova	—N/a
1971	Havana, Cuba	(Bulgaria) Maria Gigova	(Soviet Union) Elena Karpukhina	(Soviet Union) Alfia Nazmutdinova
1973	Rotterdam, Netherlands	(Bulgaria) Maria Gigova (Soviet Union) Galima Shugurova	—N/a	(Soviet Union) Natalia Krachinnekova
1975	Madrid, Spain	(West Germany) Carmen Rischer	(West Germany) Christiana Rosenberg	(Spain) María Jesús Alegre
1977	Basel, Switzerland	(Soviet Union) Irina Deriugina	(Soviet Union) Galima Shugurova	(Bulgaria) Kristina Guiourova
1979	(United Kingdom) London, Great Britain	(Soviet Union) Irina Deriugina	(Soviet Union) Elena Tomas	(Soviet Union) Irina Gabashvili
1981	Munich, West Germany	(Bulgaria) Anelia Ralenkova	(Bulgaria) Lilia Ignatova (Bulgaria) Iliana Raeva	—N/a
1983	Strasbourg, France	(Bulgaria) Diliana Georgieva	(Soviet Union) Galina Beloglazova (Bulgaria) Lilia Ignatova (Bulgaria) Anelia Ralenkova	—N/a
1985	Valladolid, Spain	(Bulgaria) Diliana Georgieva	(Bulgaria) Lilia Ignatova	(Bulgaria) Bianka Panova
1987	Varna, Bulgaria	(Bulgaria) Bianka Panova	(Bulgaria) Adriana Dunavska (Bulgaria) Elizabeth Koleva	—N/a
1989	(Socialist Federal Republic of Yugoslavia) Sarajevo, Yugoslavia	(Soviet Union) Alexandra Timoshenko	(Bulgaria) Bianka Panova	(Bulgaria) Adriana Dunavska (Soviet Union) Oksana Skaldina
1991	Piraeus, Greece	(Soviet Union) Oksana Skaldina	(Soviet Union) Alexandra Timoshenko	(Bulgaria) Mila Marinova
1992	Brussels, Belgium	(Russia) Oksana Kostina	(Bulgaria) Maria Petrova	(Belarus) Larisa Lukyanenko
1993	Alicante, Spain	(Bulgaria) Maria Petrova	(Ukraine) Kateryna Serebrianska	(Russia) Amina Zaripova
1994	Paris, France	(Bulgaria) Maria Petrova	(Belarus) Larisa Lukyanenko (Russia) Amina Zaripova	—N/a
1995	Vienna, Austria	(Bulgaria) Maria Petrova (Ukraine) Kateryna Serebrianska	—N/a	(Russia) Yana Batyrshina (Belarus) Larisa Lukyanenko
1997	Berlin, Germany	(Ukraine) Olena Vitrychenko	(Russia) Natalia Lipkovskaya	(Russia) Yana Batyrshina
1999	Osaka, Japan	(Russia) Alina Kabaeva	(Belarus) Yulia Raskina	(Russia) Yulia Barsukova
2001	Madrid, Spain	(Ukraine) Tamara Yerofeeva	(Bulgaria) Simona Peycheva	(Ukraine) Anna Bessonova
2003	Budapest, Hungary	(Russia) Alina Kabaeva	(Ukraine) Anna Bessonova	(Russia) Irina Tchachina
2005	Baku, Azerbaijan	(Russia) Olga Kapranova	(Ukraine) Anna Bessonova	(Russia) Irina Tchachina
2007	Patras, Greece	(Ukraine) Anna Bessonova	(Russia) Vera Sessina	(Russia) Olga Kapranova
2009	Mie, Japan	(Russia) Evgeniya Kanaeva	(Russia) Daria Kondakova	(Ukraine) Anna Bessonova
2010	Moscow, Russia	(Russia) Evgeniya Kanaeva	(Russia) Daria Kondakova	(Belarus) Melitina Staniouta
2011	Montpellier, France	(Russia) Evgeniya Kanaeva	(Russia) Daria Kondakova	(Azerbaijan) Aliya Garayeva
2013	Kyiv, Ukraine	(Russia) Yana Kudryavtseva	(Ukraine) Ganna Rizatdinova	(Belarus) Melitina Staniouta
2014	İzmir, Turkey	(Russia) Yana Kudryavtseva	(Russia) Margarita Mamun	(Ukraine) Ganna Rizatdinova
2015	Stuttgart, Germany	(Russia) Yana Kudryavtseva	(Russia) Margarita Mamun	(Belarus) Melitina Staniouta
2017	Pesaro, Italy	(Russia) Dina Averina	(Russia) Arina Averina	(Israel) Linoy Ashram
2018	Sofia, Bulgaria	(Russia) Dina Averina	(Israel) Linoy Ashram	(Russia) Aleksandra Soldatova
2019	Baku, Azerbaijan	(Russia) Dina Averina	(Russia) Arina Averina	(Israel) Linoy Ashram
2021	Kitakyushu, Japan	RGF Dina Averina (4)	(Belarus) Alina Harnasko	RGF Arina Averina
2022	Sofia, Bulgaria	(Italy) Sofia Raffaeli	(Germany) Darja Varfolomeev	(Bulgaria) Stiliana Nikolova
2023	Valencia, Spain	(Germany) Darja Varfolomeev	(Italy) Sofia Raffaeli	(Israel) Daria Atamanov
2025	Rio de Janeiro, Brazil	(Germany) Darja Varfolomeev	(Bulgaria) Stiliana Nikolova	(Italy) Sofia Raffaeli
2026	Frankfurt am Main, Germany	(Germany) Darja Varfolomeev	(Bulgaria) Stiliana Nikolova	(Italy) Sofia Raffaeli

== Individual Freehands ==
Individual Freehands Medalists
Year	Location	Gold	Silver	Bronze
1963	Budapest, Hungary	(Soviet Union) Ludmila Savinkova	(Soviet Union) Tatiana Kravtchenko	(Soviet Union) Elvira Averkovich
1965	Prague, Czechoslovakia	(Soviet Union) Tatiana Kravtchenko	(Czechoslovakia) Hana Machatová-Bogušovská	(Czechoslovakia) Hana Mičechová
1967	Copenhagen, Denmark	(Soviet Union) Liubov Sereda	(Soviet Union) Natalia Ovchinnikova	(Bulgaria) Krassimira Fillipova (Bulgaria) Neshka Robeva
1969	Varna, Bulgaria	(Bulgaria) Maria Gigova	(Bulgaria) Neshka Robeva (Bulgaria) Roumiana Stephanova	—N/a

== Individual Apparatus ==
Individual Apparatus Medalists
Year	Location	Gold	Silver	Bronze
1963	Budapest, Hungary	(Soviet Union) Ludmila Savinkova	(Soviet Union) Tatiana Kravtchenko	(Bulgaria) Julia Trashlieva
1965	Prague, Czechoslovakia	(Czechoslovakia) Hana Mičechová	(Soviet Union) Tatiana Kravtchenko	(Soviet Union) Lilia Nazmutdinova

== Rope ==
Rope Medalists
Year	Location	Gold	Silver	Bronze
1967	Copenhagen, Denmark	(Czechoslovakia) Hana Sitnianská	(Soviet Union) Elena Karpukhina	(East Germany) Ute Lehmann
1969	Varna, Bulgaria	(Soviet Union) Galima Shugurova	(Bulgaria) Maria Gigova	(Bulgaria) Neshka Robeva (Soviet Union) Liubov Sereda
1971	Havana, Cuba	(Bulgaria) Maria Gigova	(Bulgaria) Neshka Georgieva	(Bulgaria) Krassimira Fillipova (Soviet Union) Elena Karpukhina (Soviet Union) Alfia Nazmutdinova
1977	Basel, Switzerland	(Soviet Union) Galima Shugurova	(Czechoslovakia) Zuzana Záveská	(Czechoslovakia) Iveta Havlíčková
1979	(United Kingdom) London, Great Britain	(Bulgaria) Kristina Guiourova	(Soviet Union) Elena Tomas	(Czechoslovakia) Iveta Havlíčková (Czechoslovakia) Zuzana Záveská
1981	Munich, West Germany	(Bulgaria) Lilia Ignatova	(Bulgaria) Anelia Ralenkova	(Bulgaria) Iliana Raeva
1985	Valladolid, Spain	(Bulgaria) Diliana Georgieva	(Soviet Union) Marina Lobatch	(Bulgaria) Lilia Ignatova
1987	Varna, Bulgaria	(Bulgaria) Adriana Dunavska (Bulgaria) Bianka Panova	—N/a	(Soviet Union) Anna Kotchneva (Soviet Union) Marina Lobatch
1989	(Socialist Federal Republic of Yugoslavia) Sarajevo, Yugoslavia	(Bulgaria) Bianka Panova (Soviet Union) Oksana Skaldina (Soviet Union) Alexandra Timoshenko	—N/a	—N/a
1991	Piraeus, Greece	(Soviet Union) Alexandra Timoshenko	(Bulgaria) Kristina Shekerova	(Soviet Union) Oksana Skaldina
1992	Brussels, Belgium	(Russia) Oksana Kostina (Belarus) Larisa Lukyanenko	—N/a	(Romania) Irina Deleanu
1993	Alicante, Spain	(Ukraine) Kateryna Serebrianska	(Russia) Julia Rosliakova	(Bulgaria) Yulia Baycheva
1995	Vienna, Austria	(Belarus) Larisa Lukyanenko	(Bulgaria) Maria Petrova (Ukraine) Kateryna Serebrianska (Ukraine) Olena Vitrychenko	—N/a
1996	Budapest, Hungary	(Belarus) Larisa Lukyanenko (3)	(Ukraine) Kateryna Serebrianska	(Bulgaria) Diana Popova
1997	Berlin, Germany	(Russia) Yana Batyrshina (Ukraine) Olena Vitrychenko	—N/a	(Russia) Natalia Lipkovskaya
1999	Osaka, Japan	(Ukraine) Olena Vitrychenko	(Russia) Alina Kabaeva	(Russia) Yulia Barsukova
2001	Madrid, Spain	(Ukraine) Tamara Yerofeeva	(Bulgaria) Simona Peycheva	(Ukraine) Anna Bessonova
2005	Baku, Azerbaijan	(Russia) Olga Kapranova	(Ukraine) Anna Bessonova	(Russia) Irina Tchachina
2007	Patras, Greece	(Russia) Vera Sessina	(Russia) Olga Kapranova	(Belarus) Inna Zhukova
2009	Mie, Japan	(Russia) Evgeniya Kanaeva	(Russia) Daria Kondakova	(Ukraine) Anna Bessonova
2010	Moscow, Russia	(Russia) Daria Kondakova	(Russia) Evgeniya Kanaeva	(Belarus) Melitina Staniouta

== Hoop ==
Hoop Medalists
Year	Location	Gold	Silver	Bronze
1967	Copenhagen, Denmark	(Bulgaria) Maria Gigova	(Soviet Union) Elena Karpukhina (Soviet Union) Natalia Ovchinnikova	—N/a
1969	Varna, Bulgaria	(Bulgaria) Maria Gigova	(Bulgaria) Neshka Robeva	(Soviet Union) Liubov Sereda
1971	Havana, Cuba	(Bulgaria) Maria Gigova	(Bulgaria) Krassimira Fillipova	(Bulgaria) Neshka Georgieva
1973	Rotterdam, Netherlands	(Bulgaria) Maria Gigova (4)	(Bulgaria) Krassimira Fillipova	(Soviet Union) Natalia Krachinnekova (Hungary) Maria Patocska (Bulgaria) Neshka Robeva
1975	Madrid, Spain	(Japan) Mitsuru Hiraguchi (West Germany) Carmen Rischer	—N/a	(Spain) María Jesús Alegre
1977	Basel, Switzerland	(Soviet Union) Galima Shugurova	(Soviet Union) Irina Deriugina	(Bulgaria) Kristina Guiourova (Soviet Union) Natalia Krachinnekova
1981	Munich, West Germany	(Bulgaria) Lilia Ignatova	(Bulgaria) Iliana Raeva (Bulgaria) Anelia Ralenkova	—N/a
1983	Strasbourg, France	(Bulgaria) Anelia Ralenkova	(Soviet Union) Galina Beloglazova	(Bulgaria) Lilia Ignatova (Soviet Union) Dalia Kutkaitė
1987	Varna, Bulgaria	(Soviet Union) Marina Lobatch (Bulgaria) Bianka Panova	—N/a	(Soviet Union) Anna Kotchneva
1989	(Socialist Federal Republic of Yugoslavia) Sarajevo, Yugoslavia	(Bulgaria) Bianka Panova (Soviet Union) Oksana Skaldina (Soviet Union) Alexandra Timoshenko	—N/a	—N/a
1991	Piraeus, Greece	(Soviet Union) Alexandra Timoshenko	(Bulgaria) Mila Marinova	(Soviet Union) Oksana Skaldina
1992	Brussels, Belgium	(Russia) Oksana Kostina (Belarus) Larisa Lukyanenko	—N/a	(Bulgaria) Maria Petrova
1993	Alicante, Spain	(Bulgaria) Maria Petrova	(Ukraine) Kateryna Serebrianska	(Ukraine) Olena Vitrychenko
1994	Paris, France	(Belarus) Larisa Lukyanenko (Bulgaria) Maria Petrova (Ukraine) Kateryna Serebrianska	—N/a	—N/a
1997	Berlin, Germany	(Russia) Natalia Lipkovskaya	(Ukraine) Olena Vitrychenko	(France) Eva Serrano
1999	Osaka, Japan	(Ukraine) Olena Vitrychenko	(Russia) Alina Kabaeva	(Belarus) Evgenia Pavlina
2001	Madrid, Spain	(Bulgaria) Simona Peycheva	(Ukraine) Anna Bessonova	(Ukraine) Tamara Yerofeeva
2003	Budapest, Hungary	(Ukraine) Anna Bessonova	(Russia) Alina Kabaeva	(Russia) Irina Tchachina
2007	Patras, Greece	(Russia) Olga Kapranova	(Russia) Vera Sessina	(Ukraine) Anna Bessonova
2009	Mie, Japan	(Russia) Evgeniya Kanaeva	(Russia) Daria Kondakova	(Belarus) Melitina Staniouta
2010	Moscow, Russia	(Russia) Evgeniya Kanaeva	(Russia) Daria Kondakova	(Azerbaijan) Aliya Garayeva
2011	Montpellier, France	(Russia) Evgeniya Kanaeva	(Russia) Daria Kondakova	(Israel) Neta Rivkin
2013	Kyiv, Ukraine	(Ukraine) Ganna Rizatdinova	(Russia) Yana Kudryavtseva	(Russia) Margarita Mamun
2014	İzmir, Turkey	(Russia) Yana Kudryavtseva	(Russia) Margarita Mamun	(South Korea) Son Yeon-jae
2015	Stuttgart, Germany	(Russia) Margarita Mamun	(Russia) Aleksandra Soldatova	(Ukraine) Ganna Rizatdinova
2017	Pesaro, Italy	(Russia) Dina Averina	(Russia) Arina Averina	(Japan) Kaho Minagawa
2018	Sofia, Bulgaria	(Russia) Dina Averina	(Israel) Linoy Ashram	(Russia) Arina Averina
2019	Baku, Azerbaijan	(Russia) Ekaterina Selezneva	(Israel) Linoy Ashram	(Russia) Dina Averina
2021	Kitakyushu, Japan	RGF Dina Averina	(Belarus) Alina Harnasko	(Italy) Sofia Raffaeli
2022	Sofia, Bulgaria	(Italy) Sofia Raffaeli	(Bulgaria) Stiliana Nikolova	(Germany) Darja Varfolomeev
2023	Valencia, Spain	(Germany) Darja Varfolomeev	(Italy) Sofia Raffaeli	(Hungary) Fanni Pigniczki
2025	Rio de Janeiro, Brazil	(Italy) Sofia Raffaeli	(Bulgaria) Stiliana Nikolova	(Germany) Anastasia Simakova

== Ball ==
Ball Medalists
Year	Location	Gold	Silver	Bronze
1969	Varna, Bulgaria	(Soviet Union) Galima Shugurova	(Bulgaria) Maria Gigova (Soviet Union) Liubov Sereda	—N/a
1971	Havana, Cuba	(North Korea) Sun Duk Jo	(North Korea) Myong Sim Choi (Soviet Union) Alfia Nazmutdinova (Soviet Union) Galima Shugurova	—N/a
1973	Rotterdam, Netherlands	(Soviet Union) Galima Shugurova	(Soviet Union) Natalia Krachinnekova	(Bulgaria) Neshka Robeva
1975	Madrid, Spain	(West Germany) Christiana Rosenberg	(West Germany) Carmen Rischer	(Spain) María Jesús Alegre
1977	Basel, Switzerland	(Soviet Union) Galima Shugurova (3)	(Soviet Union) Irina Deriugina	(Soviet Union) Natalia Krachinnekova
1979	(United Kingdom) London, Great Britain	(Soviet Union) Irina Gabashvili	(Bulgaria) Iliana Raeva	(Soviet Union) Irina Deriugina
1983	Strasbourg, France	(Soviet Union) Galina Beloglazova (Bulgaria) Lilia Ignatova	—N/a	(Bulgaria) Diliana Georgieva (Bulgaria) Anelia Ralenkova
1985	Valladolid, Spain	(Bulgaria) Diliana Georgieva (Bulgaria) Lilia Ignatova	—N/a	(Soviet Union) Galina Beloglazova (East Germany) Bianca Dittrich
1989	(Socialist Federal Republic of Yugoslavia) Sarajevo, Yugoslavia	(Soviet Union) Alexandra Timoshenko	(Bulgaria) Adriana Dunavska (Soviet Union) Oksana Kostina (Bulgaria) Bianka Panova	—N/a
1991	Piraeus, Greece	(Soviet Union) Alexandra Timoshenko	(Soviet Union) Oksana Skaldina	(Bulgaria) Mila Marinova
1992	Brussels, Belgium	(Russia) Oksana Kostina	(Spain) Carmen Acedo (Bulgaria) Maria Petrova	—N/a
1993	Alicante, Spain	(Bulgaria) Maria Petrova	(Ukraine) Olena Vitrychenko	(Russia) Julia Rosliakova (Ukraine) Kateryna Serebrianska
1994	Paris, France	(Ukraine) Kateryna Serebrianska (Ukraine) Olena Vitrychenko	—N/a	(Bulgaria) Maria Petrova
1995	Vienna, Austria	(Russia) Yana Batyrshina (Ukraine) Kateryna Serebrianska (Russia) Amina Zaripova	—N/a	—N/a
1996	Budapest, Hungary	(Ukraine) Kateryna Serebrianska (3)	(Belarus) Larisa Lukyanenko (Bulgaria) Maria Petrova (Russia) Amina Zaripova	—N/a
1999	Osaka, Japan	(Russia) Alina Kabaeva	(Belarus) Yulia Raskina	(Ukraine) Tamara Yerofeeva
2001	Madrid, Spain	(Bulgaria) Simona Peycheva	(Ukraine) Anna Bessonova	(Ukraine) Tamara Yerofeeva
2003	Budapest, Hungary	(Russia) Alina Kabaeva	(Ukraine) Anna Bessonova	(Belarus) Inna Zhukova
2005	Baku, Azerbaijan	(Russia) Olga Kapranova	(Ukraine) Anna Bessonova	(Belarus) Inna Zhukova
2009	Mie, Japan	(Russia) Evgeniya Kanaeva	(Azerbaijan) Aliya Garayeva	(Ukraine) Anna Bessonova
2010	Moscow, Russia	(Russia) Evgeniya Kanaeva	(Russia) Darya Dmitriyeva	(Azerbaijan) Aliya Garayeva
2011	Montpellier, France	(Russia) Evgeniya Kanaeva (3)	(Russia) Daria Kondakova	(Belarus) Liubov Charkashyna
2013	Kyiv, Ukraine	(Russia) Margarita Mamun	(Russia) Yana Kudryavtseva	(Belarus) Melitina Staniouta
2014	İzmir, Turkey	(Russia) Yana Kudryavtseva (Russia) Margarita Mamun	—N/a	(Belarus) Melitina Staniouta
2015	Stuttgart, Germany	(Russia) Yana Kudryavtseva	(Russia) Margarita Mamun	(Belarus) Melitina Staniouta
2017	Pesaro, Italy	(Russia) Arina Averina	(Russia) Dina Averina	(Bulgaria) Neviana Vladinova
2018	Sofia, Bulgaria	(Russia) Dina Averina	(Russia) Aleksandra Soldatova	(Italy) Alexandra Agiurgiuculese
2019	Baku, Azerbaijan	(Russia) Dina Averina	(Russia) Arina Averina	(Israel) Linoy Ashram
2021	Kitakyushu, Japan	RGF Dina Averina (3)	RGF Arina Averina	(Belarus) Alina Harnasko
2022	Sofia, Bulgaria	(Italy) Sofia Raffaeli	(Germany) Darja Varfolomeev	(Italy) Milena Baldassarri
2023	Valencia, Spain	(Germany) Darja Varfolomeev	(Italy) Sofia Raffaeli	(Bulgaria) Stiliana Nikolova
2025	Rio de Janeiro, Brazil	(Germany) Darja Varfolomeev	(United States) Rin Keys	(Italy) Sofia Raffaeli

== Ribbon ==
Ribbon Medalists
Year	Location	Gold	Silver	Bronze
1971	Havana, Cuba	(Soviet Union) Alfia Nazmutdinova	(Soviet Union) Elena Karpukhina	(Soviet Union) Galima Shugurova
1973	Rotterdam, Netherlands	(Soviet Union) Galima Shugurova	(Soviet Union) Natalia Krachinnekova	(Bulgaria) Maria Gigova
1975	Madrid, Spain	(West Germany) Carmen Rischer	(West Germany) Christiana Rosenberg	(Spain) Begoña Blasco
1977	Basel, Switzerland	(Soviet Union) Irina Deriugina	(West Germany) Carmen Rischer (Soviet Union) Galima Shugurova	—N/a
1979	(United Kingdom) London, Great Britain	(Soviet Union) Elena Tomas	(Soviet Union) Irina Deriugina (Bulgaria) Kristina Guiourova	—N/a
1981	Munich, West Germany	(Soviet Union) Irina Devina	(Bulgaria) Iliana Raeva	(Bulgaria) Anelia Ralenkova
1983	Strasbourg, France	(Soviet Union) Galina Beloglazova (Bulgaria) Diliana Georgieva	—N/a	(Bulgaria) Anelia Ralenkova
1985	Valladolid, Spain	(Soviet Union) Galina Beloglazova (Bulgaria) Bianka Panova	—N/a	(Bulgaria) Diliana Georgieva
1987	Varna, Bulgaria	(Soviet Union) Tatiana Druchinina (Bulgaria) Bianka Panova	—N/a	(Bulgaria) Elizabeth Koleva
1989	(Socialist Federal Republic of Yugoslavia) Sarajevo, Yugoslavia	(Soviet Union) Oksana Skaldina	(Bulgaria) Yuliya Baicheva (Bulgaria) Adriana Dunavska (Soviet Union) Alexandra Timoshenko	—N/a
1993	Alicante, Spain	(Belarus) Tatiana Ogrizko (Bulgaria) Maria Petrova	—N/a	(Ukraine) Kateryna Serebrianska
1994	Paris, France	(Ukraine) Kateryna Serebrianska	(Bulgaria) Maria Petrova (Ukraine) Olena Vitrychenko (Russia) Amina Zaripova	—N/a
1995	Vienna, Austria	(Ukraine) Olena Vitrychenko	(Belarus) Larisa Lukyanenko (Russia) Amina Zaripova	—N/a
1996	Budapest, Hungary	(Ukraine) Olena Vitrychenko	(Russia) Yana Batyrshina	(Belarus) Evgenia Pavlina
1997	Berlin, Germany	(Ukraine) Olena Vitrychenko (3)	(Russia) Natalia Lipkovskaya	(France) Eva Serrano
1999	Osaka, Japan	(Russia) Alina Kabaeva	(Belarus) Yulia Raskina	(Ukraine) Olena Vitrychenko
2003	Budapest, Hungary	(Russia) Alina Kabaeva	(Ukraine) Anna Bessonova	(Bulgaria) Elizabeth Paisieva
2005	Baku, Azerbaijan	(Russia) Vera Sessina	(Ukraine) Anna Bessonova	(Ukraine) Natalia Godunko
2007	Patras, Greece	(Russia) Vera Sessina	(Ukraine) Anna Bessonova	(Russia) Alina Kabaeva
2009	Mie, Japan	(Russia) Evgeniya Kanaeva	(Ukraine) Anna Bessonova	(Bulgaria) Silvia Miteva
2010	Moscow, Russia	(Russia) Darya Dmitriyeva	(Russia) Daria Kondakova	(Azerbaijan) Aliya Garayeva
2011	Montpellier, France	(Russia) Evgeniya Kanaeva	(Russia) Daria Kondakova	(Bulgaria) Silvia Miteva
2013	Kyiv, Ukraine	(Russia) Yana Kudryavtseva	(Ukraine) Ganna Rizatdinova	(Belarus) Melitina Staniouta
2014	İzmir, Turkey	(Russia) Margarita Mamun	(Russia) Yana Kudryavtseva	(Ukraine) Ganna Rizatdinova
2015	Stuttgart, Germany	(Russia) Yana Kudryavtseva	(Russia) Margarita Mamun	(Ukraine) Ganna Rizatdinova
2017	Pesaro, Italy	(Russia) Arina Averina	(Russia) Dina Averina	(Israel) Linoy Ashram
2018	Sofia, Bulgaria	(Russia) Aleksandra Soldatova	(Italy) Milena Baldassarri	(Israel) Linoy Ashram
2019	Baku, Azerbaijan	(Russia) Dina Averina	(Israel) Linoy Ashram	(Russia) Ekaterina Selezneva
2021	Kitakyushu, Japan	(Belarus) Alina Harnasko	RGF Dina Averina	RGF Arina Averina
2022	Sofia, Bulgaria	(Italy) Sofia Raffaeli	(Bulgaria) Stiliana Nikolova	(Slovenia) Ekaterina Vedeneeva
2023	Valencia, Spain	(Germany) Darja Varfolomeev	(Bulgaria) Boryana Kaleyn	(Slovenia) Ekaterina Vedeneeva
2025	Rio de Janeiro, Brazil	(Germany) Darja Varfolomeev	(Bulgaria) Stiliana Nikolova	(Ukraine) Taisiia Onofriichuk

== Clubs ==
Clubs Medalists
Year	Location	Gold	Silver	Bronze
1973	Rotterdam, Netherlands	(Soviet Union) Galima Shugurova	(Soviet Union) Natalia Krachinnekova	(Bulgaria) Maria Gigova
1975	Madrid, Spain	(West Germany) Christiana Rosenberg	(Spain) María Jesús Alegre (West Germany) Carmen Rischer	—N/a
1979	(United Kingdom) London, Great Britain	(Czechoslovakia) Daniela Bošanská (Soviet Union) Irina Deriugina (Bulgaria) Iliana Raeva	—N/a	—N/a
1981	Munich, West Germany	(Bulgaria) Anelia Ralenkova	(Bulgaria) Lilia Ignatova	(Soviet Union) Irina Devina
1983	Strasbourg, France	(Bulgaria) Diliana Georgieva (Bulgaria) Lilia Ignatova	—N/a	(Soviet Union) Dalia Kutkaitė (Bulgaria) Anelia Ralenkova
1985	Valladolid, Spain	(Bulgaria) Diliana Georgieva (Bulgaria) Lilia Ignatova	—N/a	(Soviet Union) Tatiana Druchinina
1987	Varna, Bulgaria	(Soviet Union) Anna Kotchneva (Bulgaria) Bianka Panova	—N/a	(Soviet Union) Marina Lobatch
1991	Piraeus, Greece	(Soviet Union) Alexandra Timoshenko	(Bulgaria) Mila Marinova	(Italy) Samantha Ferrari
1992	Brussels, Belgium	(Russia) Oksana Kostina	(Bulgaria) Maria Petrova	(Spain) Carmen Acedo (Bulgaria) Diana Popova
1993	Alicante, Spain	(Spain) Carmen Acedo	(Spain) Carolina Pascual	(Belarus) Tatiana Ogrizko (Bulgaria) Maria Petrova (Ukraine) Olena Vitrychenko
1994	Paris, France	(Ukraine) Kateryna Serebrianska	(Bulgaria) Maria Petrova	(Russia) Amina Zaripova
1995	Vienna, Austria	(Bulgaria) Maria Petrova (Russia) Amina Zaripova	—N/a	(Ukraine) Kateryna Serebrianska (Ukraine) Olena Vitrychenko
1996	Budapest, Hungary	(Russia) Amina Zaripova	(Ukraine) Olena Vitrychenko	(Bulgaria) Maria Petrova
1997	Berlin, Germany	(Ukraine) Olena Vitrychenko	(Russia) Yana Batyrshina	(Russia) Natalia Lipkovskaya (Ukraine) Tatiana Popova
2001	Madrid, Spain	(Bulgaria) Simona Peycheva	(Belarus) Elena Tkachenko	(Ukraine) Tamara Yerofeeva
2003	Budapest, Hungary	(Ukraine) Anna Bessonova	(Russia) Irina Tchachina	(Russia) Alina Kabaeva
2005	Baku, Azerbaijan	(Russia) Olga Kapranova	(Ukraine) Anna Bessonova	(Russia) Irina Tchachina
2007	Patras, Greece	(Russia) Olga Kapranova	(Ukraine) Anna Bessonova	(Russia) Vera Sessina
2011	Montpellier, France	(Russia) Evgeniya Kanaeva	(Russia) Daria Kondakova	(Bulgaria) Silviya Miteva
2013	Kyiv, Ukraine	(Russia) Yana Kudryavtseva (Russia) Margarita Mamun	—N/a	(Ukraine) Alina Maksymenko
2014	İzmir, Turkey	(Russia) Yana Kudryavtseva	(Russia) Margarita Mamun	(Ukraine) Ganna Rizatdinova
2015	Stuttgart, Germany	(Russia) Yana Kudryavtseva	(Russia) Aleksandra Soldatova	(Ukraine) Ganna Rizatdinova
2017	Pesaro, Italy	(Russia) Dina Averina	(Belarus) Katsiaryna Halkina	(Russia) Arina Averina
2018	Sofia, Bulgaria	(Russia) Dina Averina	(Belarus) Katsiaryna Halkina	(Russia) Arina Averina
2019	Baku, Azerbaijan	(Russia) Dina Averina	(Israel) Linoy Ashram	(Ukraine) Vlada Nikolchenko
2021	Kitakyushu, Japan	RGF Dina Averina (4)	RGF Arina Averina	(Belarus) Anastasiia Salos
2022	Sofia, Bulgaria	(Germany) Darja Varfolomeev	(Bulgaria) Stiliana Nikolova	(Italy) Sofia Raffaeli
2023	Valencia, Spain	(Germany) Darja Varfolomeev	(Bulgaria) Boryana Kaleyn	(Ukraine) Viktoriia Onopriienko
2025	Rio de Janeiro, Brazil	(Germany) Darja Varfolomeev	(Romania) Amalia Lică	(Bulgaria) Stiliana Nikolova

== Teams ==
The names in italic denotes group rhythmic gymnasts.

Team All-Around Medalists
Year	Location	Gold	Silver	Bronze
1989	(Socialist Federal Republic of Yugoslavia) Sarajevo, Yugoslavia	(Bulgaria) Bulgaria; Yuliya Baicheva; Adriana Dunavska; Bianka Panova (Soviet Union) Soviet Union; Oksana Kostina; Oksana Skaldina; Alexandra Timoshenko	—N/a	(Spain) Spain; Ana Bautista; Ada Liberio; Silvia Yustos
1991	Piraeus, Greece	(Soviet Union) Soviet Union; Oksana Kostina; Oksana Skaldina; Alexandra Timoshenko	(Bulgaria) Bulgaria; Mila Marinova; Maria Petrova; Kristina Shikerova	(Spain) Spain; Carmen Acedo; Mónica Ferrández; Carolina Pascual
1993	Alicante, Spain	(Bulgaria) Bulgaria; Yuliya Baicheva; Branimira Dimitrova; Maria Petrova	(Ukraine) Ukraine; Kateryna Serebrianska; Elena Shumskaya; Olena Vitrychenko	(Russia) Russia; Inessa Gizikova; Julia Rosliakova; Amina Zaripova
1995	Vienna, Austria	(Russia) Russia; Yana Batyrshina; Natalia Lipkovskaya; Amina Zaripova	(Bulgaria) Bulgaria; Maria Petrova; Diana Popova	(Ukraine) Ukraine; Kateryna Serebrianska; Victoria Stadnik; Olena Vitrychenko
1997	Berlin, Germany	(Russia) Russia; Yana Batyrshina; Natalia Lipkovskaya; Amina Zaripova	(Belarus) Belarus; Tatiana Ogrizko; Evgenia Pavlina; Yulia Raskina; Valeria Vatkina	(Ukraine) Ukraine; Elena Gatilova; Tatiana Popova; Olena Vitrychenko; Tamara Yerofeeva
1999	Osaka, Japan	(Russia) Russia; Yulia Barsukova; Olga Belova; Alina Kabaeva; Irina Tchachina	(Belarus) Belarus; Elona Ossiadovskaya; Evgenia Pavlina; Yulia Raskina; Valeria Vatkina	(Ukraine) Ukraine; Anna Bessonova; Olena Vitrychenko; Tamara Yerofeeva
2001	Madrid, Spain	(Ukraine) Ukraine; Anna Bessonova; Olena Dzyubchuk; Natalia Godunko; Tamara Yerofeeva	(Belarus) Belarus; Elona Ossiadovskaya; Elena Tkachenko; Inna Zhukova	(Bulgaria) Bulgaria; Yuliana Naidenova; Elizabeth Paysieva; Simona Peycheva
2003	Budapest, Hungary	(Russia) Russia; Alina Kabaeva; Olga Kapranova; Vera Sessina; Irina Tchachina	(Ukraine) Ukraine; Anna Bessonova; Natalia Godunko; Tamara Yerofeeva	(Belarus) Belarus; Liubov Charkashyna; Valeria Kurylskaya; Svetlana Rudalova; Inna Zhukova
2005	Baku, Azerbaijan	(Russia) Russia; Olga Kapranova; Svetlana Putintseva; Vera Sessina; Irina Tchachina	(Ukraine) Ukraine; Anna Bessonova; Natalia Godunko; Irina Kovalchuk	(Belarus) Belarus; Liubov Charkashyna; Valeria Kurylskaya; Svetlana Rudalova; Inna Zhukova
2007	Patras, Greece	(Russia) Russia; Alina Kabaeva; Evgeniya Kanaeva; Olga Kapranova; Vera Sessina	(Belarus) Belarus; Liubov Charkashyna; Svetlana Rudalova; Inna Zhukova	(Azerbaijan) Azerbaijan; Aliya Garayeva; Dinara Gimatova; Anna Gurbanova; Zeynab Javadli
2009	Mie, Japan	(Russia) Russia; Daria Dmitrieva; Evgeniya Kanaeva; Olga Kapranova (4); Daria Kondakova	(Belarus) Belarus; Liubov Charkashyna; Svetlana Rudalova; Melitina Staniouta	(Azerbaijan) Azerbaijan; Aliya Garayeva; Anna Gurbanova; Zeynab Javadli
2010	Moscow, Russia	(Russia) Russia; Daria Dmitrieva; Evgeniya Kanaeva; Daria Kondakova; Yana Lukonina	(Belarus) Belarus; Liubov Charkashyna; Aliaksandra Narkevich; Hanna Rabtsava; Melitina Staniouta	(Azerbaijan) Azerbaijan; Aliya Garayeva; Anna Gurbanova; Samira Mustafayeva
2011	Montpellier, France	(Russia) Russia; Daria Dmitrieva; Evgeniya Kanaeva (4); Daria Kondakova; Alexandra Merkulova	(Belarus) Belarus; Liubov Charkashyna; Aliaksandra Narkevich; Hanna Rabtsava; Melitina Staniouta	(Ukraine) Ukraine; Alina Maksymenko; Viktoria Mazur; Ganna Rizatdinova; Victoriia Shynkarenko
2014	İzmir, Turkey	(Russia) Russia; Yana Kudryavtseva; Margarita Mamun; Aleksandra Soldatova	(Belarus) Belarus; Arina Charopa; Katsiaryna Halkina; Melitina Staniouta	(Ukraine) Ukraine; Viktoria Mazur; Ganna Rizatdinova; Eleonora Romanova
2015	Stuttgart, Germany	(Russia) Russia; Yana Kudryavtseva; Margarita Mamun; Aleksandra Soldatova	(Belarus) Belarus; Hanna Bazhko; Arina Charopa; Katsiaryna Halkina; Melitina Staniouta	(Ukraine) Ukraine; Viktoria Mazur; Ganna Rizatdinova; Eleonora Romanova
2018	Sofia, Bulgaria	(Russia) Russia; Arina Averina; Dina Averina; Aleksandra Soldatova	(Bulgaria) Bulgaria; Boryana Kaleyn; Katrin Taseva; Neviana Vladinova	(Italy) Italy; Alexandra Agiurgiuculese; Milena Baldassarri; Alessia Russo
2019	Baku, Azerbaijan	(Russia) Russia; Arina Averina; Dina Averina; Ekaterina Selezneva	(Israel) Israel; Linoy Ashram; Yuliana Telegina; Nicol Voronkov; Nicol Zelikman	(Belarus) Belarus; Katsiaryna Halkina; Alina Harnasko; Anastasiia Salos
2021	Kitakyushu, Japan	RGF; Arina Averina; Dina Averina; Anastasia Bliznyuk; Polina Orlova; Angelina Shkatova; Alisa Tishchenko; Maria Tolkacheva	(Italy) Italy; Alexandra Agiurgiuculese; Milena Baldassarri; Sofia Raffaeli; Martina Centofanti; Agnese Duranti; Alessia Maurelli; Daniela Mogurean; Martina Santandrea	(Belarus) Belarus; Alina Harnasko; Anastasiia Salos; Hanna Haidukevich; Anastasiya Malakanava; Anastasiya Rybakova; Arina Tsitsilina; Karyna Yarmolenka
2022	Sofia, Bulgaria	(Italy) Italy; Milena Baldassarri; Sofia Raffaeli; Martina Centofanti; Agnese Duranti; Alessia Maurelli; Daniela Mogurean; Laura Paris; Martina Santandrea	(Germany) Germany; Margarita Kolosov; Darja Varfolomeev; Anja Kosan; Daniella Kromm; Alina Oganesyan; Francine Schöning; Hannah Vester	(Spain) Spain; Alba Bautista; Polina Berezina; Ana Arnau; Inés Bergua; Valeria Márquez; Mireia Martínez; Patricia Pérez; Salma Solaun
2023	Valencia, Spain	(Bulgaria) Bulgaria; Eva Brezalieva; Boryana Kaleyn; Stiliana Nikolova; Sofia Ivanova; Kamelia Petrova; Rachel Stoyanov; Radina Tomova; Zhenina Trashlieva	(Germany) Germany; Margarita Kolosov; Darja Varfolomeev; Anja Kosan; Daniella Kromm; Alina Oganesyan; Hannah Vester; Emilia Wickert	(Italy) Italy; Milena Baldassarri; Sofia Raffaeli; Martina Centofanti; Agnese Duranti; Alessia Maurelli; Daniela Mogurean; Laura Paris; Alessia Russo
2025	Rio de Janeiro, Brazil	(Germany) Germany; Anastasia Simakova; Darja Varfolomeev; Melanie Dargel; Olivia Falk; Anja Kosan; Helena Ripken; Anna-Maria Shatokhin; Emilia Wickert	(Bulgaria) Bulgaria; Eva Brezalieva; Stiliana Nikolova; Danaya Atanasova; Sofia Ivanova; Alina Kolomiets; Emilia Obretenova; Rachel Stoyanov	(Ukraine) Ukraine; Polina Karika; Taisiia Onofriichuk; Yelyzaveta Azza; Diana Baieva; Valeriia Peremeta; Kira Shyrykina; Nadiia Yurina; Oleksandra Yushchak

== Group All-Around ==
Group All-Around Medalists
Year	Location	Gold	Silver	Bronze
1967	Copenhagen, Denmark	Soviet Union	Czechoslovakia	Bulgaria
1969	Varna, Bulgaria	Bulgaria	Soviet Union	Czechoslovakia
1971	Havana, Cuba	Bulgaria	Soviet Union	Italy
1973	Rotterdam, Netherlands	Soviet Union	Czechoslovakia	East Germany
1975	Madrid, Spain	Italy	Japan	Spain
1977	Basel, Switzerland	Soviet Union	Bulgaria	Czechoslovakia
1979	London, England	Soviet Union	Czechoslovakia	Bulgaria
1981	Munich, West Germany	Bulgaria	Soviet Union	Czechoslovakia
1983	Strasbourg, France	Bulgaria	Soviet Union	North Korea
1985	Valladolid, Spain	Bulgaria	North Korea; Soviet Union	—N/a
1987	Varna, Bulgaria	Bulgaria	Soviet Union	China; Spain
1989	(Socialist Federal Republic of Yugoslavia) Sarajevo, Yugoslavia	Bulgaria	Soviet Union	Spain
1991	Piraeus, Greece	Spain	Soviet Union	North Korea
1992	Brussels, Belgium	Russia	Spain	North Korea
1994	Paris, France	Russia	Spain	Bulgaria
1995	Vienna, Austria	Bulgaria	Spain	Belarus
1996	Budapest, Hungary	Bulgaria	Spain	Belarus
1998	Seville, Spain	Belarus	Spain	Russia
1999	Osaka, Japan	Russia	Greece	Belarus
2002	New Orleans, United States	Russia	Belarus	Greece
2003	Budapest, Hungary	Russia	Bulgaria	Belarus
2005	Baku, Azerbaijan	Russia	Italy	Belarus
2007	Patras, Greece	Russia	Italy	Belarus
2009	Mie, Japan	Italy	Belarus	Russia
2010	Moscow, Russia	Italy	Belarus	Russia
2011	Montpellier, France	Italy	Russia	Bulgaria
2013	Kyiv, Ukraine	Belarus	Italy	Russia
2014	İzmir, Turkey	Bulgaria	Italy	Belarus
2015	Stuttgart, Germany	Russia	Bulgaria	Spain
2017	Pesaro, Italy	Russia	Bulgaria	Japan
2018	Sofia, Bulgaria	Russia	Italy	Bulgaria
2019	Baku, Azerbaijan	Russia	Japan	Bulgaria
2021	Kitakyushu, Japan	RGF	Italy	Belarus
2022	Sofia, Bulgaria	Bulgaria	Israel	Spain
2023	Valencia, Spain	Israel	China	Spain
2025	Rio de Janeiro, Brazil	Japan	Brazil	Spain

== Group Single Apparatus ==
Group Single Apparatus Medalists
Year	Location	Gold	Silver	Bronze
1987	Varna, Bulgaria	Bulgaria	Soviet Union	China
1989	(Socialist Federal Republic of Yugoslavia) Sarajevo, Yugoslavia	Bulgaria	Soviet Union	Spain
1991	Piraeus, Greece	Soviet Union	Bulgaria; Spain	—N/a
1992	Brussels, Belgium	Russia	Italy	Spain
1994	Paris, France	Russia	Bulgaria	Spain
1995	Vienna, Austria	Bulgaria	Spain	Belarus
1996	Budapest, Hungary	Belarus	Russia	Ukraine
1998	Seville, Spain	Russia	Belarus	Ukraine
1999	Osaka, Japan	Greece	Russia	Belarus
2002	New Orleans, United States	Ukraine	Russia	Greece
2003	Budapest, Hungary	Russia	Bulgaria	Italy
2005	Baku, Azerbaijan	Bulgaria	Italy	Russia
2007	Patras, Greece	Russia	Italy	Bulgaria
2009	Mie, Japan	Russia	Italy	Belarus
2010	Moscow, Russia	Russia	Italy	Bulgaria
2011	Montpellier, France	Russia	Italy	Bulgaria
2013	Kyiv, Ukraine	Spain	Italy	Ukraine
2014	İzmir, Turkey	Spain	Israel	Belarus
2015	Stuttgart, Germany	Italy	Russia	Japan
2017	Pesaro, Italy	Italy	Russia	Japan
2018	Sofia, Bulgaria	Bulgaria	Japan	Italy
2019	Baku, Azerbaijan	Japan	Bulgaria	Russia
2021	Kitakyushu, Japan	RGF	Italy	Japan
2022	Sofia, Bulgaria	Italy	Israel	Spain
2023	Valencia, Spain	China	Spain	Italy
2025	Rio de Janeiro, Brazil	China	Japan	Spain

== Group Multiple Apparatus ==
Group Multiple Apparatus Medalists
Year	Location	Gold	Silver	Bronze
1987	Varna, Bulgaria	Bulgaria	China	Spain
1989	(Socialist Federal Republic of Yugoslavia) Sarajevo, Yugoslavia	Soviet Union	Bulgaria	Spain
1991	Piraeus, Greece	Soviet Union	Spain	North Korea
1992	Brussels, Belgium	Russia	Ukraine	Italy
1994	Paris, France	Bulgaria	Russia	Spain
1995	Vienna, Austria	Spain	Bulgaria	Russia
1996	Budapest, Hungary	Spain	Russia	Belarus
1998	Seville, Spain	Spain	Belarus	Ukraine
1999	Osaka, Japan	Greece	Belarus	Russia
2002	New Orleans, United States	Greece	Bulgaria	Belarus
2003	Budapest, Hungary	Russia	Bulgaria	Italy
2005	Baku, Azerbaijan	Italy	Russia	Belarus
2007	Patras, Greece	Russia	Italy	Bulgaria
2009	Mie, Japan	Italy	Belarus	Russia
2010	Moscow, Russia	Russia	Italy	Belarus
2011	Montpellier, France	Bulgaria	Italy	Israel
2013	Kyiv, Ukraine	Russia	Belarus	Spain
2014	İzmir, Turkey	Russia	Bulgaria	Belarus
2015	Stuttgart, Germany	Russia	Italy	Bulgaria
2017	Pesaro, Italy	Russia	Japan	Bulgaria
2018	Sofia, Bulgaria	Italy	Russia	Ukraine
2019	Baku, Azerbaijan	Russia	Japan	Italy
2021	Kitakyushu, Japan	Italy	RGF	Japan
2022	Sofia, Bulgaria	Bulgaria	Italy	Azerbaijan
2023	Valencia, Spain	Israel	China	Ukraine
2025	Rio de Janeiro, Brazil	Ukraine	Brazil	China

== Multiple gold medalists ==
Boldface denotes active rhythmic gymnasts and highest medal count among all rhythmic gymnasts (including these who not included in these tables) per type.

=== All events ===
Rank	Rhythmic gymnast	Country	From	To	Gold	Silver	Bronze	Total
1	Dina Averina	Russia; Russian Gymnastics Federation	2017	2021	**18**	3	1	22
2	Evgeniya Kanaeva	Russia	2007	2011	17	1	–	18
3	Yana Kudryavtseva	Russia	2013	2015	13	3	–	16
4	Maria Tolkacheva	Russia; Russian Gymnastics Federation	2014	2021	11	4	1	16
4	**Darja Varfolomeev**	Germany	2022	2025	11	4	1	16
6	Alexandra Timoshenko	Soviet Union	1989	1991	10	2	–	12
7	Olga Kapranova	Russia	2003	2009	10	1	1	12
8	Maria Petrova	Bulgaria	1991	1996	9	9	4	22
9	Olena Vitrychenko	Ukraine	1992	1999	9	7	7	23
10	Galima Shugurova	Soviet Union	1969	1977	9	4	1	14

=== Individual events ===
Rank	Rhythmic gymnast	Country	From	To	Gold	Silver	Bronze	Total
1	Dina Averina	Russia; Russian Gymnastics Federation	2017	2021	**15**	3	1	19
2	Evgeniya Kanaeva	Russia	2009	2011	13	1	–	14
3	Yana Kudryavtseva	Russia	2013	2015	11	3	–	14
4	**Darja Varfolomeev**	Germany	2022	2025	10	2	1	13
5	Olena Vitrychenko	Ukraine	1993	1999	9	5	4	18
6	Galima Shugurova	Soviet Union	1969	1977	9	4	1	14
7	Maria Gigova	Bulgaria	1967	1973	9	2	2	13
8	Maria Petrova	Bulgaria	1992	1996	8	7	4	19
9	Kateryna Serebrianska	Ukraine	1993	1996	8	4	3	15
10	Bianka Panova	Bulgaria	1985	1989	8	2	1	11

=== Records ===
Category	All events	Individual events
Most medals	(Ukraine) Anna Bessonova : 27 medals (5 gold, 15 silver and 7 bronze)	(Ukraine) Anna Bessonova : 22 medals (3 gold, 13 silver and 6 bronze)
