= Liubov Sereda =

Soviet rhythmic gymnast

- Full name: Liubov Paradieva Sereda
- Born: 1945 (age 80–81) Grozny, Russia

Gymnastics career
- Discipline: Rhythmic gymnastics
- Country represented: Soviet Union
- Head coach: Maria Lisitzian
- Assistant coach: Nina Silaeva
Medal record
Representing Soviet Union
World Championships
Gold medal – first place	1967 Copenhagen	Freehands
Silver medal – second place	1967 Copenhagen	All-around
Silver medal – second place	1969 Varna	All-around
Silver medal – second place	1969 Varna	Ball
Bronze medal – third place	1969 Varna	Hoop
Bronze medal – third place	1969 Varna	Rope

Liubov Paradieva Sereda (Russian: Любовь Парадиева Середа; born 1945) is a retired Soviet rhythmic gymnast. She is a two time (1969, 1967) World All-around silver medalist.

== Biography ==
Sereda was born in Grozny, Republic of Chechnya. As a child she wanted to be a ballerina, she started gymnastics at age 10. She and her coach Silaeva later moved to Kyiv to train in rhythmic gymnastics.

She was a four time USSR Cup champion. Sereda competed in her first World championship at the 1967 Worlds in Copenhagen, Denmark. She was the favorite to win the All-around gold where she was leading the first three rotations until a drop from the last apparatus in rope placed her in third, she won the bronze in All-around behind East German Ute Lehmann with teammate Elena Karpuchina taking the gold medal. She won the Freehands

At the 1969 World Championships in Varna, she shared the silver with Bulgarian Neshka Robeva and teammate Galima Shugurova. She won the silver in ball and bronze medal in rope and hoop final. At the end of her sporting career, she briefly took up as a coach, she taught at the Kyiv Institute of Physical Education as an English teacher. In 1990, Sereda relocated to Moscow, Russia where she is working in a Moscow Sports School.
