= Natalia Krachinnekova =

Soviet rhythmic gymnast

- Alternative name: Natalia Krasheninikova
- Born: Stavropol, Russia SSR

Gymnastics career
- Discipline: Rhythmic gymnastics
- Country represented: Soviet Union
- Retired: yes
Medal record
Representing Soviet Union
World Championships
Silver medal – second place	1973 Rotterdam	Clubs
Silver medal – second place	1973 Rotterdam	Ball
Silver medal – second place	1973 Rotterdam	Ribbon
Bronze medal – third place	1973 Rotterdam	All-around
Bronze medal – third place	1977 Basel	Ball
Bronze medal – third place	1977 Basel	Hoop

Natalia Krachinnekova (Russian: Наталья Крашенинникова; in Stavropol, Russia SSR) is a former individual rhythmic gymnast who competed for the Soviet Union. She is the 1979 World All-around silver medalist.

== Career ==
Krachinnekova competed in 2 World Championships, she took the all-around bronze medal at the 1973 World Championships behind teammate Galina Shugurova, she won silver in ball, ribbon and clubs in the event finals. She made the Soviet team again in 1977 at the 1977 World Championships in Basel where she won bronze in hoop and ball.
