= Rosliakov =

Rosliakov or Roslyakov (Russian: Росляков), feminine: Rosliakova or Roslyakova is a Russian and Ukrainian surname. Notable people with the surname include:

- Ilya Rosliakov, Russian ski jumper
- Julia Rosliakova, Russian rhythmic gymnast
- Vlada Roslyakova, Russian model
- Vladislav Roslyakov, perpetrator of the 2018 Kerch Polytechnic College massacre
