= Olena Shumska =

Ukrainian rhythmic gymnast (born 1977)

- Born: 1977 (age 48–49)

Gymnastics career
- Country represented: Ukraine
- Club: Deriugins School
- Head coach: Albina Deriugina
- Assistant coach: Iryna Deriugina
Medal record
Rhythmic gymnastics
Representing Ukraine
World Championships
Silver medal – second place	1993 Alicante	Team
Bronze medal – third place	1996 Budapest	5 Hoops
European Championships
Gold medal – first place	1994 Thessaloniki	Team

Olena Shumska, also known as Elena Shumskaya, is a Ukrainian former individual and group rhythmic gymnast.

She competed at the 1993 World Rhythmic Gymnastics Championships, held in Alicante. She reached the rope final, where she finished in 8th place, and received a silver medal in the team event.

In 1994, Shumska won a gold medal in the team competition at the 1994 Rhythmic Gymnastics European Championships in Thessaloniki along with her teammates Olena Vitrychenko and Kateryna Serebrianska.

In 1996 she competed at the World Championships in Budapest as a member of the group. The group finished 5th in the all-around. In the finals, they finished 4th with three balls and two ribbons and won the bronze medal with five hoops.
