= Erika Schiller (gymnast) =

Soviet rhythmic gymnast

- Эрика Эдуардовна Шиллер
- Full name: Erika Eduardovna Schiller
- Born: 9 July 1960 Dushanbe, Tajik SSR, USSR

Gymnastics career
- Discipline: Rhythmic gymnastics
- Country represented: Soviet Union
- Head coach: Rosa Barinova
Medal record
Representing Soviet Union
World Championships
Gold medal – first place	1977 Basel	Group All-Around

Erika Eduardovna Schiller (Russian: Эрика Эдуардовна Шиллер; born 9 July 1960) is a Soviet retired rhythmic gymnast. She represented the Soviet Union as part of the national group.

== Biography ==
Schiller studied at Dushanbe secondary school No. 28 and the republican sport boarding school. She took up the sport in first grade, from the age of 10 she trained under the guidance of Rosa Barinova in the rhythmic gymnastics section of DSO "Tajikistan".

She was the champion of the Tajik SSR. In 1976, she won bronze at the USSR Championship in free hands and in the All-Around at the USSR Cup. These result earned her the title of Master of Sport of the USSR, International Class. In 1977 she won the gold medal at the World Championships in Basel in group exercises as part of the USSR national team, with a score of 38,370 points.
