= Iveta Havlíčková =

Czech rhythmic gymnast (born 1961)

- Born: 1961 (age 64–65) Czechoslovakia

Gymnastics career
- Discipline: Rhythmic gymnastics
- Country represented: Czechoslovakia (1977–1982)
- Retired: yes
Medal record
Representing Czechoslovakia
World Championships
Bronze medal – third place	1977 Basel	Rope
Bronze medal – third place	1979 London	Rope

Iveta Havlíčková (born 1961) is a Czech former rhythmic gymnast. She's a two times World bronze medalist.

== Career ==
Havlíčková debuted at the 1977 World Championships in Basel, where she was 9th in the All-Around, 7th with ribbon and won bronze with rope. The same year she was crowned national champion. In 1978 she competed at the European Championships in Madrid ending 8th in the All-Around and with rope and 4th with ball.

A year later she took part in the World Championships in London, finishing 6th in the All-Around, 6th with clubs, 7th with ball and won again bronze with rope. In 1981 she was 8th in the All-Around and 7th with ribbon at the World Championships in Munich. She took 9th place in the All-Around in the 1982 European Championships in Stavanger, her last international tournament.
