= Recouvith Bloch =

Israeli former rhythmic gymnast (1960–2014)

Recouvith Bloch-Halperin
- רקובית בלוך-הלפרין
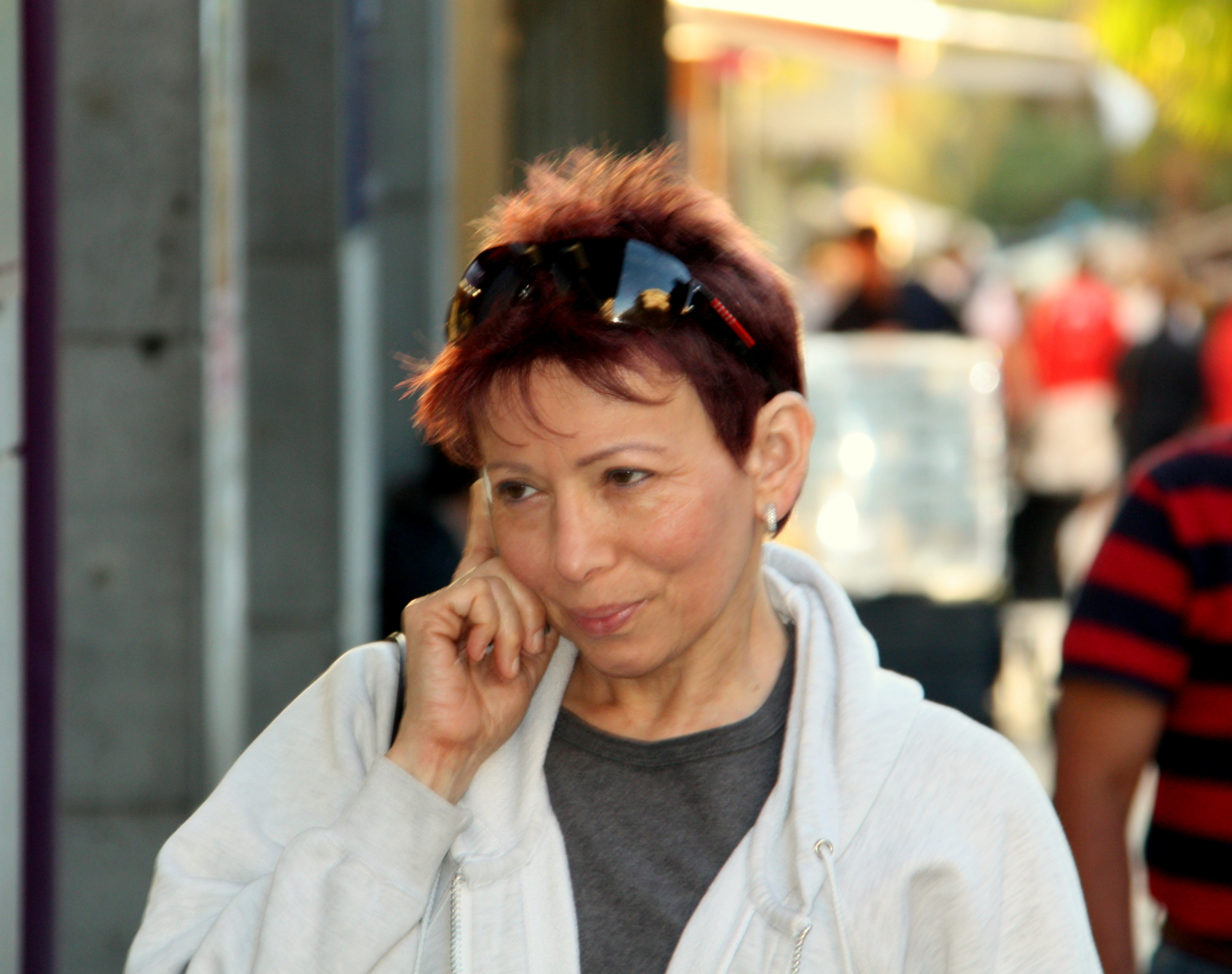
- Born: 29 July 1960; Lithuania
- Died: 15 June 2014 (aged 53)
- Education: Tel Aviv University
- Occupations: Rhythmic gymnast, gynecologist, obsetrician, university professor
- Employer: Assaf Harofeh Medical Center
- Spouse: Doron Halperin
- Children: 2

Recouvith Bloch-Halperin (Hebrew: רקובית בלוך-הלפרין; 29 July 1960 – 15 June 2014) was an Israeli former rhythmic gymnast, gynecologist and university professor.

== Biography ==
Bloch was born in Lithuania, Soviet Union. After immigrating to Israel in 1973, she began training with Hapoel Holon.

In 1973 she competed at the World Championships in Rotterdam, the first edition of the World Championships that Israel participated in. She finished 54th in the all-around. At the 1975 World Championships in Madrid, she was 33rd in the all-around in part due to the Soviet Union, Bulgaria and East Germany, all dominant countries in rhythmic gymnastics, being absent from the competition. In 1977, she competed at the World Championships in Basel and took 69th place in the all-around.

She then became a professor of gynecology and obstetrics and served as deputy director of the obstetrics and gynecology division at Assaf Harofeh Hospital. She graduated from the Technion in 1984. After completing her medical studies, she received a PhD from Tel Aviv University, which she completed during her military service as part of the academic reserve. In 2004 she received the title of professor at Tel Aviv University. In 2010, Bloch was named to the list of the 100 most influential researchers in the world.

In 2003, she contracted metastatic breast cancer. Bloch was married to Doron Halperin and they have two children, Daniel and Ortal.
