= Julia Rosliakova =

Russian rhythmic gymnast (born 1975)

- Alternative name: Yulia Roslyakova
- Born: January 5, 1975 (age 51) Moscow, Russian SSR, Soviet Union

Gymnastics career
- Discipline: Rhythmic gymnastics
- Country represented: Russia
- Club: SDYUSSHOR 74
- Gym: Novogorsk
- Head coach: Irina Viner
- Assistant coach: Alla Yanina
- Retired: yes
Medal record
Rhythmic Gymnastics
Representing Russia
World Championships
Silver medal – second place	1993 Alicante	Rope
Bronze medal – third place	1993 Alicante	Ball
Bronze medal – third place	1993 Alicante	Team
European Championships
Silver medal – second place	1994 Thessaloniki	Rope
Bronze medal – third place	1992 Stuttgart	Team
European Cup Final
Bronze medal – third place	1993 Málaga	Ball

Julia Rosliakova (born January 5, 1975) is a retired individual rhythmic gymnast who competed for Russia.

== Career ==
Rosliakova began her career training in the club of SDYUSSHOR 74 and was trained under the guidance of Alla Yanina. In 1992, after the collapse of the Soviet Union, Rosliakova decided to compete for Russia and was admitted to the newly formed national team. The leader of the World team was Oxana Kostina followed by her younger teammates Amina Zaripova and Rosliakova. They won the bronze medal in the team event (tied with the Spanish team) at the 1992 European Championships.

After the tragic death of Kostina, the Russian national composition was then led by Zaripova. Rosliakova along with Amina Zaripova and Inessa Gizikova competed at the 1993 World Championships in Alicante, Spain where Russia won the team bronze, she won two individual meals: a silver medal in rope and bronze in ball, she finished 8th in the all-around finals behind Spain's Carolina Pascual.

Rosliakova appeared at three European Championships in 1992, 1993 and 1994.
