= Carmen Rischer =

German rhythmic gymnast (born 1956)

- Born: 16 May 1956 (age 70) Schwerte
- Height: 1.53 m (5 ft 0 in)

Gymnastics career
- Discipline: Rhythmic gymnastics
- Country represented: West Germany
- Retired: yes
Medal record
Rhythmic Gymnastics
Representing West Germany
World Championships
| Gold medal – first place | 1975 Madrid | All-Around |
| Gold medal – first place | 1975 Madrid | Hoop |
| Gold medal – first place | 1975 Madrid | Ribbon |
| Silver medal – second place | 1975 Madrid | Ball |
| Silver medal – second place | 1975 Madrid | Clubs |
| Silver medal – second place | 1977 Basel | Ribbon |
European Championships
| Bronze medal – third place | 1980 Amsterdam | Hoop |

Carmen Rischer (born 16 May 1956) is an individual rhythmic gymnast. She was the 1975 World all-around champion. She also won the bronze medal in hoop at the 1980 European Championships in Amsterdam.

== Biography ==
Rischer was born on 16 May 1956 in Schwerte, North Rhine-Westphalia. She began taking ballet lessons at age five due to the fact she was sickly as a toddler. Rischer's doctor advised that her posture might become permanently damaged because of her illness. Her gymnastics talent was discovered in 1971.

Internationally, she competed at the 1973 World Championships, finishing 21st in the all-around. At the 1975 championships in Madrid, the rhythmic gymnasts from the Soviet Union, Bulgaria and East Germany were absent. In their absence, Rischer and teammate Christiana Rosenberg dominated the competition. Rischer won the all-around title ahead of Rosenberg; she also won the gold medals in hoop and ribbon and a silver medal for clubs.

In 1977, she was invited to an international competition in Canada, but due to an injury, she could not compete. At the 1977 World Championships, she finished 6th in the all-around and ball finals and won silver in the ribbon final.

At the first Rhythmic Gymnastics European Championships in 1978, she tied for fourth place with Daniela Bošanská. Rischer competed in the 1979 World Championships and was 7th in the all-around; she also competed in three apparatus finals.

She was again fourth place in the all-around at the 1980 European Championships, and she also won a bronze medal in the hoop final. In 1981, she competed at the first international rhythmic gymnastics meet held in the United States. She won the all-around event and ribbon finals and was bronze in the hoop final. At her last World Championships in 1981, she was sixth in the all-around and competed in all four apparatus finals.
