= Kristina Guiourova =

Bulgarian rhythmic gymnast (born 1959)

- Alternative name: Kristina Guyurova
- Born: 17 February 1959 (age 67) Sofia, Bulgaria

Gymnastics career
- Discipline: Rhythmic gymnastics
- Country represented: Bulgaria
- Retired: yes
Medal record
Representing Bulgaria
World Championships
Gold medal – first place	1979 London	Rope
Silver medal – second place	1979 London	Ribbon
Bronze medal – third place	1977 Basel	All-around
Bronze medal – third place	1977 Basel	Hoop
European Championships
Bronze medal – third place	1978 Madrid	Ball
Bronze medal – third place	1978 Madrid	Rope

Kristina Guiourova (Bulgarian: Кристина Гюрова; born 17 February 1959 in Sofia, Bulgaria) is a Bulgarian former individual rhythmic gymnast who now works as a coach. She is the 1977 World all-around bronze medalist as well as the 1979 World champion with rope and silver medalist with ribbon.

== Personal life ==
Guiourova's mother was rhythmic gymnastics coach Julieta Shishmanova, who died in a plane crash on 16 March 1978; she was on the way to a competition, along with several other officials and two gymnasts who also died in the crash. Guiourova's daughter, Julieta Cantaluppi, is named in honor of her mother. Cantaluppi also competed in rhythmic gymnastics for Italy and now works as a coach.

== Career ==
In 1977, Guiourova competed at the 1977 World Championships and won bronze medals in the all-around and hoop. At the first European Championships in 1978, she was 7th in the all-around and won two medals in the apparatus finals, bronze with rope and ball. She repeated her success at the 1979 World Championships in London, where she won a gold medal in rope and silver in ribbon.

After her competitive career, she moved to Italy, married, and began coaching in Fabriano. While her daughter, Cantaluppi, was competing, Guiourova coached her.

In an interview during that time, she was critical of the organization of the Bulgarian Rhythmic Gymnastics Foundation as well as how her daughter's performance was judged at a recurring tournament named after her mother. When asked if she would return to the tournament the next year, she said, "Next year? No way. I won’t allow it. I was kicked out the moment my mother died. The Bulgarian federation kicked me out so that I wouldn’t participate anymore. They are just using my mother’s name as advertising." Guiourova also later alleged that her daughter was "not allowed" to compete for Bulgaria and that she was also not well-supported by the Italian federation.

Cantaluppi began to coach alongside Guiourova after she finished competing. They worked together on choreographing routines, and Guiourova sometimes accompanied their gymnasts, such as Milena Baldassarri and Sofia Raffaeli, to competitions. However, Cantaluppi left Italy to become the head coach of the Israeli national team in 2023, and Guiourova said that she offered to continue coaching their gymnasts and was instead banned from the gym. Guiourova said that she did not support her daughter working for the Israeli federation, but that she supported her daughter and her gymnasts.
