= Elena Tomas =

Soviet rhythmic gymnast (born 1961)

- Born: January 11, 1961 (age 65) Moscow

Gymnastics career
- Discipline: Rhythmic gymnastics
- Country represented: Soviet Union
Medal record
Representing Soviet Union
World Championships
Gold medal – first place	1979 London	Ribbon
Silver medal – second place	1979 London	All-around
Silver medal – second place	1979 London	Rope
European Championships
Silver medal – second place	1980 Amsterdam	Rope
USSR Cup
Gold medal – first place	1980 Tbilisi	Clubs
Silver medal – second place	1980 Tbilisi	Hoop
Silver medal – second place	1980 Tbilisi	Ribbon
Silver medal – second place	1981 Tallinn	All-around
Bronze medal – third place	1980 Tbilisi	All-around
Bronze medal – third place	1980 Tbilisi	Rope

Elena Tomas (Russian: Елена Томас; born 11 January 1961 in Moscow) is a former individual rhythmic gymnast who competed for the Soviet Union. She is the 1979 World All-around silver medalist.

== Career ==
From an early age, Tomas toured the United States with a Soviet team and introduced modern rhythmic gymnastics to a new audience. Tomas made her breakthrough amongst the many Soviet rhythmic gymnasts of her time in 1979 when she competed at the 1979 World Championships. She won silver in All-around, gold in Ribbon and another silver in Rope. She repeated her success in 1980 at the European Championships and Soviet Championships.

Tomas lives and coaches in Spain.
