= Christiana Rosenberg =

German rhythmic gymnast

- Full name: Christiana Rosenberg-Ahlhaus
- Born: 1958 (age 67–68) Germany

Gymnastics career
- Discipline: Rhythmic gymnastics
- Country represented: West Germany
- Retired: yes
Medal record
Representing West Germany
Rhythmic Gymnastics
World Championships
Gold medal – first place	1975 Madrid	Ball
Gold medal – first place	1975 Madrid	Clubs
Silver medal – second place	1975 Madrid	All-Around
Silver medal – second place	1975 Madrid	Ribbon

Christiana Rosenberg-Ahlhaus (born in Germany) is an individual rhythmic gymnast. She was the 1975 World all-around silver medalist.

== Biography ==
The absence of rhythmic gymnasts from the Soviet Union, Bulgaria and East Germany. For Western German athletes at the time, the highest ranked athletes remaining in contention meant Rosenberg and teammate Carmen Rischer competing at the 1975 World Championships in Madrid, Spain. Rosenberg went on to win the All-around silver medal behind teammate Rischer, she also won the gold medal in Ball and Clubs and a silver medal for Ribbon.

After her competitive career, Rosenberg studied ‘Play-Music-Dance’ at the Deutsche Sporthochschule Köln; and upon completing her studies she worked there as a teacher in the field of rhythm and dance. Since 1984 she has been a scientific assistant at the University of Konstanz, where she holds a doctorate degree and is in charge of training in the field of dance and dance research, among others. Since 1986 she has been directing the dance group of the University of Konstanz and collaborating as a dancer in several contemporary productions. She is also the author of various specialist books on the topic of dance and movement, and has been the chairwoman of the Gesellschaft für Tanzforschung since 2012.
