= 1977 World Rhythmic Gymnastics Championships =

- Venue: St. Jakobshalle
- Location: Basel, Switzerland
- Start date: 13 October 1977
- End date: 16 October 1977

The VIII World Rhythmic Gymnastics Championships were held in Basel, Switzerland from 13 to 16 October 1977.

29 countries sent gymnasts, with 22 of those sending groups; 78 individual gymnasts were entered. Groups performed routines with six pairs of clubs, which were performed twice; individuals competed with rope, hoop, ball, and ribbon. The number of gymnasts allowed into finals increased from six to eight.

Soviet gymnasts dominated the competition; Carmen Rischer, the all-around champion from the previous World Championships (where dominant Communist nations such as the Soviet Union and Bulgaria did not send competitors), placed sixth, to the displeasure of German fans, who disrupted the competition by booing her final all-around score for more than ten minutes. Galima Shugurova won silver behind Irina Deriugina in the all-around but went on to win three of the event finals. The Soviet group (made of Erika Schiller and Olga Rabinovich among others) won among groups.

== Medal table ==
Rank	Nation	Gold	Silver	Bronze	Total
1	Soviet Union (URS)	6	4	2	12
2	Bulgaria (BUL)	0	1	2	3
2	Czechoslovakia (TCH)	0	1	2	3
4	West Germany (FRG)	0	1	0	1
Totals (4 entries)		6	7	6	19

== Individual ==
=== Hoop ===
Place	Nation	Name	AA Score	AF Score	Total
1	(Soviet Union)	Galima Shugurova	9.600	9.800	19.400
2	(Soviet Union)	Irina Deriugina	9.600	9.700	19.300
3=	(Bulgaria)	Kristina Guiourova	9.500	9.650	19.150
3=	(Soviet Union)	Natalia Krachinnekova	9.550	9.600	19.150
5	(Bulgaria)	Svetla Koltchevska	9.500	9.550	19.050
6=	(Bulgaria)	Valentina Ganeva	9.400	9.550	18.950
6=	(Cuba)	Sonia Pedroso	9.400	9.550	18.950
8	(Czechoslovakia)	Zuzana Záveská	9.450	9.450	18.900

=== Ball ===
Place	Nation	Name	AA Score	AF Score	Total
1	(Soviet Union)	Galima Shugurova	9.750	9.900	19.650
2	(Soviet Union)	Irina Deriugina	9.850	9.750	19.600
3	(Soviet Union)	Natalia Krachinnekova	9.800	9.650	19.450
4	(Bulgaria)	Kristina Guiourova	9.700	9.700	19.400
5	(Poland)	Slavomira Sobkovska	9.550	9.550	19.100
6	(West Germany)	Carmen Rischer	9.550	9.500	19.050
7	(West Germany)	Irene Godecke	9.550	9.450	19.000
8	(Bulgaria)	Svetla Koltchevska	9.550	9.050	18.600

=== Ribbon ===
Place	Nation	Name	AA Score	AF Score	Total
1	(Soviet Union)	Irina Deriugina	9.700	9.750	19.450
2=	(West Germany)	Carmen Rischer	9.650	9.550	19.200
2=	(Soviet Union)	Galima Shugurova	9.550	9.650	19.200
4	(West Germany)	Irene Godecke	9.550	9.600	19.150
5	(Bulgaria)	Kristina Guiourova	9.500	9.600	19.100
6	(Bulgaria)	Valentina Ganeva	9.400	9.600	19.000
7	(Czechoslovakia)	Iveta Havlíčková	9.350	9.500	18.850
8	(Japan)	Kumiko Fumoto	9.350	9.400	18.750

=== Rope ===
Place	Nation	Name	AA Score	AF Score	Total
1	(Soviet Union)	Galima Shugurova	9.700	9.800	19.500
2	(Czechoslovakia)	Zuzana Záveská	9.700	9.650	19.350
3	(Czechoslovakia)	Iveta Havlíčková	9.600	9.700	19.300
4	(Bulgaria)	Valentina Ganeva	9.600	9.650	19.250
5=	(Bulgaria)	Kristina Guiourova	9.550	9.250	18.800
5=	(Bulgaria)	Svetla Koltchevska	9.400	9.400	18.800
5=	(Soviet Union)	Natalia Krachinnekova	9.400	9.400	18.800
8	(Soviet Union)	Irina Deriugina	9.500	9.250	18.750

=== All-Around ===
Place	Nation	Name	Hoop	Ball	Ribbon	Rope	Total
1	(Soviet Union)	Irina Deriugina	9.600	9.850	9.700	9.500	38.650
2	(Soviet Union)	Galima Shugurova	9.600	9.750	9.550	9.700	38.600
3	(Bulgaria)	Kristina Guiourova	9.500	9.700	9.500	9.550	38.250
4=	(Bulgaria)	Valentina Ganeva	9.400	9.400	9.400	9.600	37.800
4=	(Soviet Union)	Natalia Krachinnekova	9.550	9.800	9.050	9.400	37.800
6	(West Germany)	Carmen Rischer	9.200	9.550	9.650	9.350	37.750
7	(Czechoslovakia)	Zuzana Záveská	9.450	9.300	9.250	9.700	37.700
8	(Bulgaria)	Svetla Koltchevska	9.500	9.550	9.050	9.400	37.500
9=	(Czechoslovakia)	Iveta Havlíčková	8.700	9.450	9.350	9.600	37.100
9=	(Poland)	Slavomira Sobkovska	9.250	9.550	9.150	9.150	37.100
11	(East Germany)	Susanne Ebert	9.250	9.500	8.950	9.350	37.050
12=	(Italy)	Cristina Cammelli	9.300	9.500	8.850	9.350	37.00
12=	(West Germany)	Irene Godecke	9.150	9.550	9.550	8.750	37.00
14	(Japan)	Miwako Arao	9.050	9.400	9.300	9.150	36.900
15=	(Japan)	Kumiko Fumoto	9.100	9.150	9.350	9.200	36.800
15=	(East Germany)	Sunhild Krause	9.000	9.500	9.100	9.200	36.800
15=	(Canada)	Shirley Lethinen	9.250	9.150	9.100	9.300	36.800
18	(Japan)	Yumiko Kobayashi	9.350	9.000	9.200	9.200	36.750
19	(Spain)	Maria Jesus Alegre	8.700	9.300	9.300	9.400	36.700
20	(Spain)	Susana Mendizábal	9.150	9.250	9.000	9.200	36.600
21	(Czechoslovakia)	Jana Kučerová	9.000	9.250	9.000	9.300	36.550
22	(Spain)	Begona Blasco	9.000	9.200	9.150	9.150	36.500
23=	(Cuba)	Aida Hernandez-Barrientos	9.300	9.300	9.200	8.550	36.350
23=	(West Germany)	Patricia Peschke	8.950	9.200	8.900	9.300	36.350
25	(Poland)	Jadwiga Hemmerling	8.800	9.250	9.100	9.050	36.200
26	(Cuba)	Sonia Pedroso	9.400	9.300	8.550	8.550	35.800
27	(Cuba)	Cecilia Juara-Rosell	8.450	9.250	9.000	9.000	35.700
28	(Netherlands)	Hanneke Tienstra	8.650	8.850	8.850	9.250	35.600
29=	(Sweden)	Anna Janson	9.050	8.850	8.650	9.000	35.550
29=	(Socialist Federal Republic of Yugoslavia)	Jasna Radosavljevic	9.000	8.850	8.800	8.900	35.550
31	(Sweden)	Lena Smith	9.100	9.100	8.600	8.700	35.500
32	(Canada)	Kelly Moligan	8.950	8.250	8.750	9.300	35.250
33=	(Poland)	Renata Urbanik	8.050	8.950	8.950	9.250	35.200
33=	(Netherlands)	Berthy Van de Kraak	8.350	8.950	8.950	8.950	35.200
35	(Hungary)	Gyorgyi Kovacs	8.300	9.100	9.050	8.100	34.550
36	(Netherlands)	Ankie Van Werd	8.800	8.900	8.350	8.400	34.450
37	(Canada)	Debbie Bryant	7.850	8.750	8.750	8.850	34.200
38	(Italy)	Isabelle Zumino	8.100	8.600	8.700	8.650	34.050
39	(Switzerland)	Susanne Zimmermann	8.500	8.250	8.350	8.700	33.800
40=	(Socialist Federal Republic of Yugoslavia)	Stela Djordjevic	7.950	8.850	8.300	8.600	33.700
40=	(Brazil)	Laura Seixas	8.250	8.750	8.450	8.250	33.700
42	(Finland)	Leila Jaaskelainen	8.350	8.750	8.150	8.350	33.600
43	(France)	Martine Feraud	8.600	8.950	7.400	8.350	33.300
44=	(United States)	Lydia Bree	8.200	8.750	7.800	8.350	33.100
44=	(Brazil)	Clarice Pinto Lopez	7.650	8.450	8.250	8.750	33.100
46	(Austria)	Monika Bachmann	8.150	8.450	8.200	8.250	33.050
47	(United States)	Sue Soffe	7.400	8.800	8.350	8.350	32.900
48	(Socialist Federal Republic of Yugoslavia)	Majda Kovacevic	7.650	8.100	8.100	8.800	32.650
49	(Austria)	Ursula Wicklicki	7.750	8.500	8.300	8.000	32.550
50	(Denmark)	Anna Hansen	8.150	8.400	8.150	7.800	32.500
51=	(New Zealand)	Bronwyn Clark	8.000	8.550	7.750	8.050	32.350
51=	(Brazil)	Gilda Fontenelle	8.250	7.950	7.900	8.250	32.350
53	(Denmark)	Vibeke Franzen	8.200	8.450	7.600	8.050	32.300
54	(France)	Martine Fournier	7.350	7.900	8.400	8.600	32.250
55	(Sweden)	Lena Bergstroem	7.800	8.850	7.600	7.900	32.150
56=	(New Zealand)	Karen Corlett	7.700	8.450	8.000	7.750	31.900
56=	(United Kingdom)	Judith Robertson	7.550	8.650	7.750	7.950	31.900
58	(France)	Marielle Decarpigny	7.400	7.600	8.250	8.400	31.650
59	(Denmark)	Aase-Lodal Andersen	7.550	8.150	8.100	7.800	31.600
60	(United States)	Kathryn Brym	7.750	7.950	7.950	7.850	31.500
61	(New Zealand)	Kaye Wilson	7.550	7.900	8.200	7.650	31.300
62	(Austria)	Elisabeth Strumpf	7.500	7.900	8.050	7.650	31.100
63	(United Kingdom)	Eileen Word	6.900	8.000	7.950	8.200	31.050
64	(Belgium)	Claire Audenaarde	8.050	7.250	7.750	7.750	30.800
65	(Mexico)	Laura Ayala	7.600	8.200	7.650	6.800	30.250
66	(Israel)	Jubal Kfir	7.350	7.600	7.650	6.750	29.350
67	(Mexico)	Irasema Trujillo	7.000	7.450	7.400	7.250	29.100
68	(United Kingdom)	Elisabeth Mann	7.400	8.650	4.900	7.800	28.750
69=	(Israel)	Recouvith Bloch	8.000	8.000	5.000	28.500	
69=	(Hungary)	Brigitta Sziraczky	9.050	8.650	1.650	9.150	28.500
71	(Argentina)	Adriana Re	6.850	7.350	7.200	6.650	28.050
72	(Mexico)	Michelle Grimberg	6.700	7.000	6.500	7.050	27.250
73	(Belgium)	Ingrid Leruth	-	8.150	7.950	-	16.100

== Groups ==
Place	Nation	Score
1	Soviet Union	38.370
2	Bulgaria	38.300
3	Czechoslovakia	37.600
4=	Japan	37.470
4=	East Germany	37.470
6	Italy	36.400
7	Spain	36.250
8	Canada	36.150
9	Hungary	35.750
10	Switzerland	34.100
11=	Netherlands	34.000
11=	Norway	34.00
13	West Germany	33.550
14	Denmark	33.450
15	Finland	33.300
16	France	33.100
17	Cuba	33.050
18	Brazil	32.850
19	Austria	32.300
20	Belgium	32.200
21	(United Kingdom) Great Britain	29.850
