= Maria Gigova =

Bulgarian gymnast and sports official (born 1947)

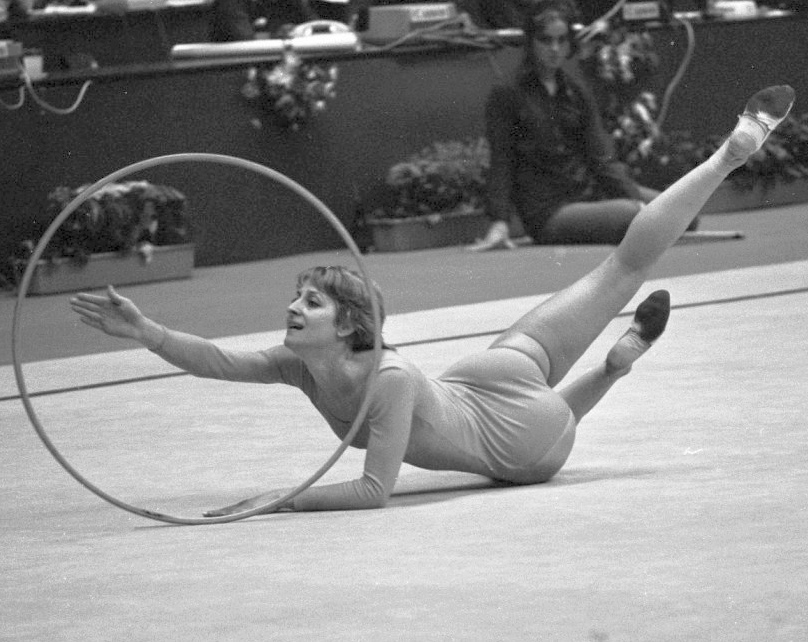
- Gigova in 1973

Personal information
- Born: 21 April 1947 (age 79) Sofia, Bulgaria

Gymnastics career
- Discipline: Rhythmic gymnastics
- Country represented: Bulgaria
- Club: CSKA Sofia
- Head coach: Julieta Shishmanova
- Assistant coach: Lili Mircheva
- Retired: 1974
Medal record
Rhythmic Gymnastics
Representing Bulgaria
World Championships
Gold medal – first place	1967 Copenhagen	Hoop
Gold medal – first place	1969 Varna	All-around
Gold medal – first place	1969 Varna	Free hands
Gold medal – first place	1969 Varna	Hoop
Gold medal – first place	1971 Havana	All-around
Gold medal – first place	1971 Havana	Rope
Gold medal – first place	1971 Havana	Hoop
Gold medal – first place	1973 Rotterdam	All-around
Gold medal – first place	1973 Rotterdam	Hoop
Silver medal – second place	1969 Varna	Rope
Silver medal – second place	1969 Varna	Ball
Bronze medal – third place	1973 Rotterdam	Ribbon
Bronze medal – third place	1973 Rotterdam	Clubs

Maria Verdova Gigova (Bulgarian: Мария Вердова Гигова; born 21 April 1947) is a retired Bulgarian rhythmic gymnast and sports official. She is a three-time World All-around Champion, having won the title in 1969,1971, and 1973.

== Biography ==
Maria Gigova was the first gymnast to become a three-time World All-Around Champion in rhythmic gymnastics, winning titles in 1969, 1971, and 1973. She holds a record four gold medals in the hoop event (1967, 1969, 1971, and 1973), an achievement that remains unmatched. She also won individual world titles in rope (1971) and free exercise (1969). As part of the Bulgarian team, she contributed to team gold medals at the World Championships in 1969 and 1971.

At the 1971 World Championships, Gigova shared the all-around title with Soviet gymnast Galima Shugurova. Notably, both performed their ribbon routines to the same music—an excerpt from Bizet's Carmen. Gigova was Bulgaria’s first rhythmic gymnastics world champion and played a key role in the sport’s development in the country.

She retired from competition in 1974 and later graduated from the National Sports Academy in Sofia. In 1978, Gigova joined the FIG Technical Committee, serving until 1992. That same year, she was appointed vice-president of the Bulgarian Rhythmic Gymnastics Federation and became its president in 1982. She served on the federation’s Administrative Council from 1989 to 1999 and was re-elected president in 1999. Since 2000, she has once again been a member of the FIG Technical Committee.

On 4 May 2017, Gigova was awarded the Order of Stara Planina (1st class) by President Rumen Radev in recognition of her contributions to Bulgarian sport.

== Achievements ==
- Gigova was the first rhythmic gymnast to win three consecutive World All-Around titles, securing victories in 1969, 1971 (shared with Galima Shugurova), and 1973. Her record was later matched by fellow Bulgarian Maria Petrova (1993, 1994, 1995, the last shared with Ukraine’s Ekaterina Serebryanskaya), and by Russian gymnasts Evgenia Kanaeva (2009, 2010, 2011) and Yana Kudryavtseva (2013, 2014, 2015). However, Gigova achieved this feat when the World Championships were held biennially, unlike her successors who competed annually.
- She was the first Bulgarian rhythmic gymnast to win a World Championship title.
- In 1972, Gigova was awarded the title of Merited Master of Sport of the USSR.
