= Irina Gabashvili =

Georgian rhuthimic gymnast and coach

- Born: 15 August 1960 Tbilisi, Soviet Georgia
- Died: 23 March 2009 (aged 48) Vancouver, Washington

Gymnastics career
- Discipline: Rhythmic gymnastics
- Country represented: Soviet Union
Medal record
Representing Soviet Union
World Championships
Gold medal – first place	1979 London	Ball
Bronze medal – third place	1979 London	All-around

Irina Gabashvili (15 August 1960 – 23 March 2009) was a Georgian-born Soviet gymnast. She began gymnastics at age 10 and was coached by Neli Saladze. She was the 1979 World individual all-around bronze medalist.

== Personal life ==
Born in Tbilisi, Gabashvili began gymnastics at age 10 and was coached by Neli Saladze. She was the 1979 World individual all-around bronze medalist. She earned a degree in history from Georgia State University and later a degree in physical culture education. Her sister, Eka, was a decade younger and a Georgian national junior high jump champion in 1985. Eka's coach, Serge Maevski, became a good friend of the family, then a good friend of Irina's. Romance blossomed, and they married on 7 April 1984. Their son, Dmitri, was born in 1986 after she had retired from competition.

In 1993, Irina was offered a position of coach for the Malaysian rhythmic team. She took the team from last place in 1994 to first place in the 1998 Commonwealth Games. She spent seven years coaching the Malaysian gymnastics team, which won the team gold at the 1998 Commonwealth Games. She moved to the U.S. in May 2000. Gabashvili coached in the United States from 2000 to 2008 and was a coach at Westside Gymnastics Academy in Portland, Oregon along with Wuling Stephenson and Bettina Megowan.

== Marriage ==
She was married to Serge Maevski and had a son, Dmitri Maevski.

== Death ==
Irina Gabashvili was diagnosed with breast cancer in 2004. She underwent chemotherapy, but the cancer eventually returned. She died on 23 March 2009 in Vancouver, Washington, aged 48. A memorial service was held at Holy New Martyrs of Russia Orthodox Church in Mulino, Oregon.
