= Irina Deriugina =

Soviet rhythmic gymnast (born 1958)

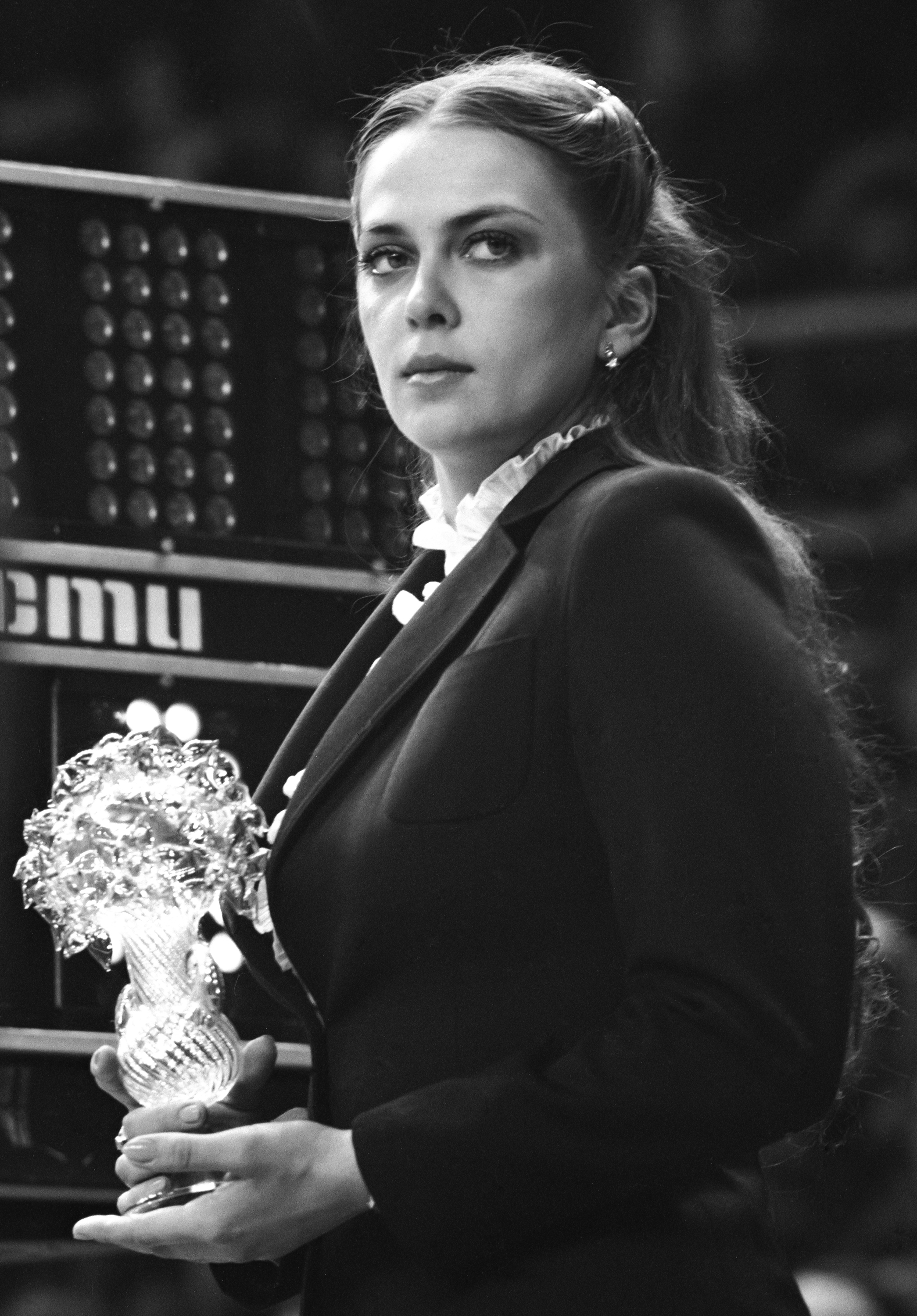
- Deriugina in 1981

Personal information
- Full name: Irina Ivanivna Deriugina
- Born: 11 January 1958 (age 68) Kyiv, Ukrainian SSR, Soviet Union

Gymnastics career
- Discipline: Rhythmic gymnastics
- Former countries represented: Soviet Union
- Club: Spartak Kiev
- Gym: Deriugins School
- Head coach: Albina Deriugina
- Retired: yes
Medal record
Representing Soviet Union
World Championships
Gold medal – first place	1977 Basel	All-Around
Gold medal – first place	1977 Basel	Ribbon
Gold medal – first place	1979 London	All-Around
Gold medal – first place	1979 London	Clubs
Silver medal – second place	1977 Basel	Hoop
Silver medal – second place	1977 Basel	Ball
Silver medal – second place	1979 London	Ribbon
Bronze medal – third place	1979 London	Ball
European Championships
Gold medal – first place	1978 Madrid	Ball
Silver medal – second place	1978 Madrid	All-around
Silver medal – second place	1978 Madrid	Rope
Silver medal – second place	1978 Madrid	Ribbon
USSR Championships
Gold medal – first place	1975 Rostov-on-Don	All-around
Gold medal – first place	1975 Rostov-on-Don	Hoop
Gold medal – first place	1975 Rostov-on-Don	Ribbon
Gold medal – first place	1975 Rostov-on-Don	Freehands
Gold medal – first place	1976 Tbilisi	All-around
Gold medal – first place	1976 Tbilisi	Clubs
Gold medal – first place	1976 Tbilisi	Ribbon
Gold medal – first place	1977 Severodonetsk	All-around
Gold medal – first place	1977 Severodonetsk	Hoop
Gold medal – first place	1977 Severodonetsk	Ball
Gold medal – first place	1977 Severodonetsk	Ribbon
Gold medal – first place	1977 Severodonetsk	Clubs
Gold medal – first place	1978 Odessa	All-around
Gold medal – first place	1978 Odessa	Freehands
Gold medal – first place	1978 Odessa	Ball
Gold medal – first place	1979 Tomsk	All-around
Silver medal – second place	1975 Rostov-on-Don	Ball
Silver medal – second place	1975 Rostov-on-Don	Clubs
Silver medal – second place	1976 Tbilisi	Freehands
Silver medal – second place	1976 Tbilisi	Hoop
Silver medal – second place	1976 Tbilisi	Ball
Silver medal – second place	1977 Severodonetsk	Freehands
Silver medal – second place	1978 Odessa	Rope
Bronze medal – third place	1974 Minsk	All-around
Bronze medal – third place	1981 Kiev	All-around

Irina Ivanivna Deriugina (Ukrainian: Іри́на Іва́нівна Дерю́ґіна; born 11 January 1958) is a Ukrainian former individual rhythmic gymnast athlete who competed for the Soviet Union, and is now a Ukrainian coach in rhythmic gymnastics. She is the only Soviet rhythmic gymnast to win two all-around world titles, which she won at the 1977 and 1979. Her mother, Albina, was her coach, and her success influenced the further development of rhythmic gymnastics in Kyiv.

== Career ==
Deriugina was born to Ukrainian athletes from Eastern Ukraine: Albina Deriugina, a gymnast, and Ivan Deriuhin, a pentathlete. At age ten, in 1968, Deriugina entered the National Ballet School. From 1976 to 1980, she studied at the Kyiv National Institute of Physical Culture. Deriugina was a member of the Soviet rhythmic gymnastics squad from 1972 until her retirement from the sport in 1982, after which she was appointed the Ukrainian national coach.

From 1988 to 1992, Deriugina was in charge of the rhythmic gymnastics technical organizing committee, serving as competition director. At her Kyiv school, which she ran with her mother until Albina Deriugina's death, she trains forty high-level gymnasts. Two former gymnasts have alleged that conditions at the school were abusive. Since 1992, they have also organized the annual rhythmic tournament, the Deriugina Cup.

Irina Deriugina in 2024

Deriugina was a judge at the 1988 Seoul and 1992 Barcelona. She was involved in a judging scandal at the 2000 European Championships in Zaragoza, Spain, when she and five other judges were found to have discriminated against Ukrainian gymnast Olena Vitrychenko in their scoring compared to other gymnasts. As a result, the six judges were suspended for one year, and none of the judges at the European Championships were allowed to judge at the 2000 Summer Olympics.

== Personal life ==
Deriugina was married to Oleh Blokhin, a Ukrainian football striker and coach who was European Footballer of the Year in 1975. They have a daughter, Iryna Blokhina, a pop artist, socialite, and choreographer for the Deriugins' School's students.
