= Oksana Kostina =

Russian individual rhythmic gymnast

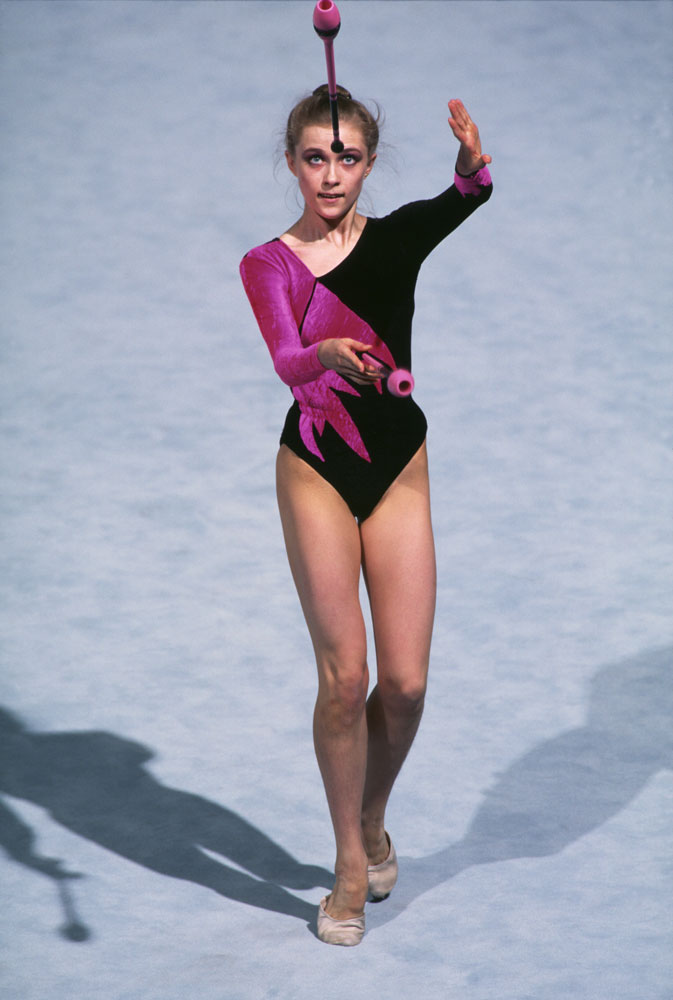

Personal information
- Born: 15 April 1972 Irkutsk, Russian SFSR, Soviet Union
- Died: 11 February 1993 (aged 20) Moscow, Russia

Gymnastics career
- Discipline: Rhythmic gymnastics
- Country represented: Russia
- Former countries represented: Soviet Union
- Assistant coach: Olga Buyanova
Medal record
Representing Russia
World Championships
Gold medal – first place	1992 Brussels	All-around
Gold medal – first place	1992 Brussels	Rope
Gold medal – first place	1992 Brussels	Hoop
Gold medal – first place	1992 Brussels	Ball
Gold medal – first place	1992 Brussels	Clubs
European Championships
Gold medal – first place	1992 Stuttgart	Hoop
Gold medal – first place	1992 Stuttgart	Ball
Gold medal – first place	1992 Stuttgart	Clubs
Bronze medal – third place	1992 Stuttgart	All-around
Bronze medal – third place	1992 Stuttgart	Team
Representing Soviet Union
World Championships
Gold medal – first place	1989 Sarajevo	Team
Gold medal – first place	1991 Athens	Team
Silver medal – second place	1989 Sarajevo	Ball
European Championships
Gold medal – first place	1990 Gothenburg	Team
Gold medal – first place	1990 Gothenburg	Hoop
Goodwill Games
Silver medal – second place	1990 Seattle	Ball
Bronze medal – third place	1990 Seattle	All-around
Bronze medal – third place	1990 Seattle	Rope

Oksana Alexandrovna Kostina (Russian: Оксана Александровна Костина; 15 April 1972 – 11 February 1993) was a Russian individual rhythmic gymnast. She was the 1992 World All-around champion and 1992 European All-around bronze medalist.

== Career ==
For years, Kostina remained in the shadow of two Ukrainian gymnasts, Oksana Skaldina and Olexandra Tymoshenko. Though she won the all-around bronze medal at the 1992 European Championships, she was not selected for the Olympic Games in Barcelona. Kostina and her coach, Olga Buyanova, frustrated by what they felt was the Unified Team's favoritism toward Skaldina, traveled to Barcelona and Kostina trained with the British team for a short time before she was ordered home.

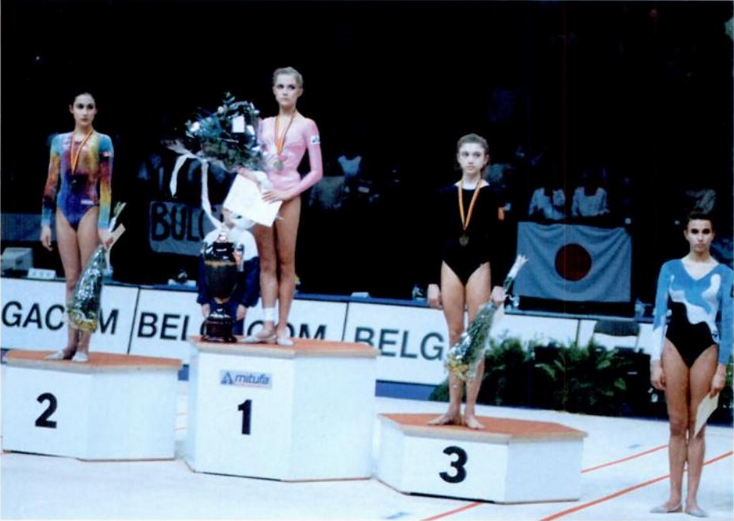
Kostina at the 1992 World Rhythmic Gymnastics Championships

In the absence of the two Ukrainian gymnasts, Kostina won the All-around gold medal, as well as gold medals in rope, hoop, ball and clubs at the 1992 World Championships in Brussels. She became Russia's first World Champion as an independent country. Her goal was to compete at the 1996 Summer Olympics in Atlanta.

== Death ==
Kostina died in a car crash on 11 February 1993 in Moscow. She was engaged to Eduard Zenovka, a fellow athlete and Pentathlon bronze-medalist at the Olympic Games in Barcelona. A lorry that was driving in the opposite direction crashed head-on into their vehicle. Both athletes were seriously injured and needed surgery in hospital. Sixteen hours later, Kostina died from injuries sustained at the car crash. The police investigation revealed that Zenovka, who was driving the car, was heavily intoxicated at the time of the accident.

== Achievements ==
Kostina was one of the few gymnasts to win gold medals in all of the apparatus in a single World Championship, along with Darja Varfolomeev, Bianka Panova, Ekaterina Serebrianskaya and Evgenia Kanaeva.
