= Neshka Robeva =

Bulgarian rhythmic gymnast (born 1946)

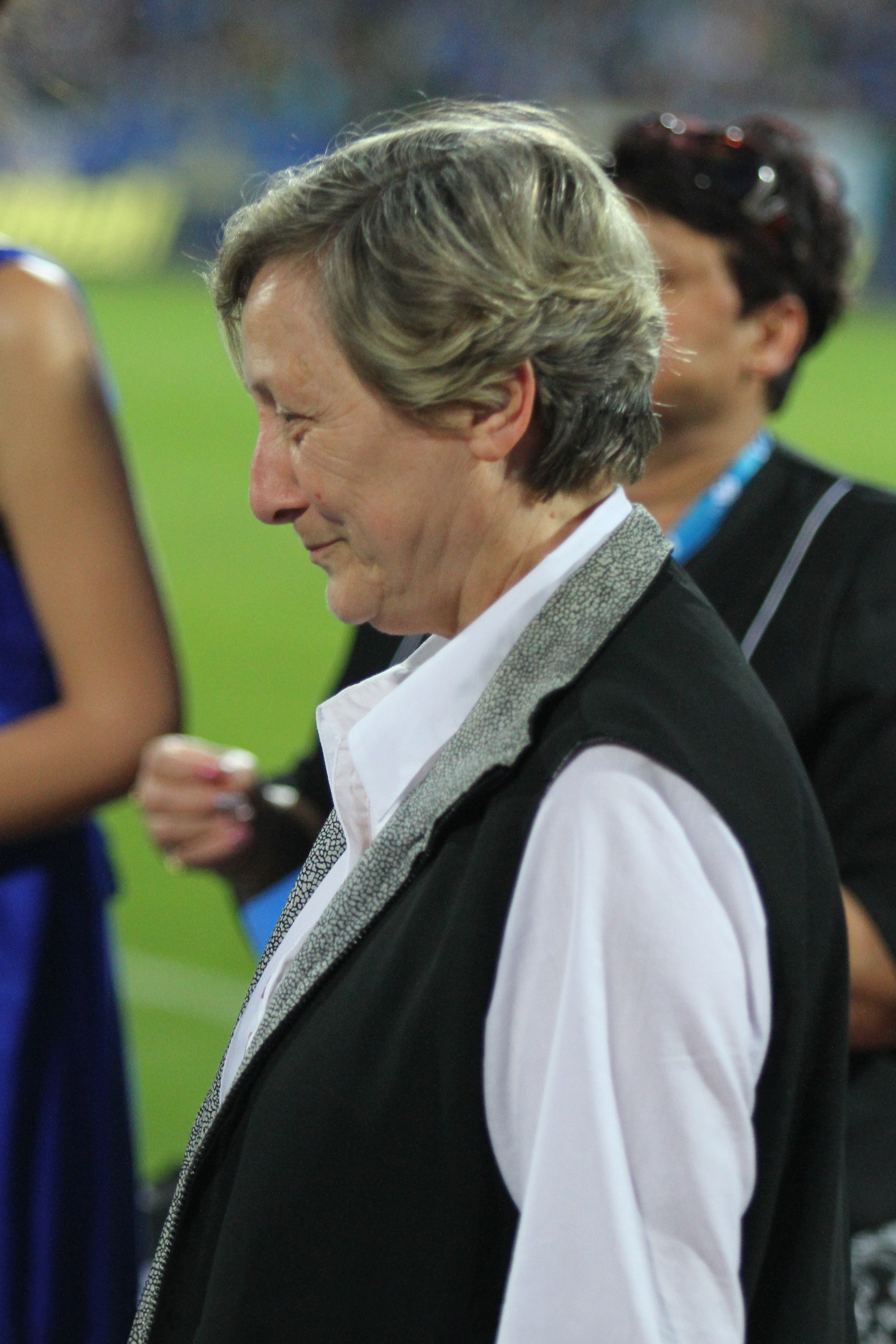

Personal information
- Born: 26 May 1946 (age 80) Rousse, Bulgaria

Gymnastics career
- Discipline: Rhythmic gymnastics
- Country represented: Bulgaria
Medal record
Representing Bulgaria
World Championships
| Silver medal – second place | 1969 Varna | All-around |
| Silver medal – second place | 1969 Varna | Free-hand |
| Silver medal – second place | 1969 Varna | Hoop |
| Bronze medal – third place | 1967 Copenhagen | Free-hand |
| Bronze medal – third place | 1969 Varna | Rope |
| Bronze medal – third place | 1973 Rotterdam | Hoop |
| Bronze medal – third place | 1973 Rotterdam | Ball |

Neshka Stefanova Robeva (Bulgarian: Нешка Стефанова Робева; born 26 May 1946) is a Bulgarian former rhythmic gymnast and coach.

== Early life ==
Born in Rousse, Robeva moved to Sofia at 14 to study at the Bulgarian State Choreography School. She graduated from the School five years later, and while studying, she developed an interest in traditional Bulgarian dances.

== Career ==
Robeva began gymnastics at the relatively late age of 20 in 1966 and won her first national championship four months later. She was a member of the Bulgarian national rhythmic gymnastics team until 1973. She took part in four World Championships (1967, 1969, 1971, 1973) and won silver in the all-around in 1969.

After her competitive career, Robeva started work as a coach at the "Levski" club. In 1978, she was appointed head coach of the Bulgarian National Team. Robeva briefly resigned in late 1989 due to political disagreements with the Bulgarian government and left to coach in Japan for two months, only to return after the fall of the Berlin Wall. She remained as head coach until 1999.

Her tenure was a very successful period for Bulgarian rhythmic gymnastics. Her years as head coach are remembered as the "Golden Girls" period and her European and World champions as the "Golden Girls of Bulgaria". The successes of several generations of Bulgarian gymnasts are closely tied to her name. Her gymnasts won 294 World, European and Olympic medals.

Robeva was also noted for encouraging each gymnast to develop a sense of musical sensitivity and artistry. She would allow her gymnasts to go to discos and see how they danced to inspire the choreography for their routines. Gymnasts were allowed to contribute ideas to their routines and training, rather than having to fit to an entirely standardized system. She was initially criticized for this approach, but it resulted in routines that were praised for their originality and suited for each individual gymnast.

However, Robeva has also been criticized for imposing harsh discipline on her trainees. Former gymnasts recounted physical and psychological abuse, including extreme control over their weight and being beaten. Her neighbor recalled her forcing gymnasts who stayed at her house to vomit after meals. Robeva admitted to practices such as beating her gymnasts and continuing trainings past midnight.

In 1988, Robeva was the choreographer and dance producer for the dance in the film Acatamus from the director Georgi Djulgerov. From 1993 until 1997, she was a member of the European Gymnastics Committee. She is currently the honorary president of the "Levski" rhythmic gymnastics club.

Robeva has also lead and choreographed for a dance troupe, Neshanal Art, whose performances blended traditional Bulgarian dances with other dance styles such as jazz and tango. Her shows Twin Kingdoms, which premiered in 2000, and Orisia toured for more than 250 international performances.

In February 2009, the dance ensemble led by Neshka Robeva took part in a gala concert at the Bolshoi Theatre in Moscow, as part of the Bulgarian Cultural Days in Russia. The event also featured the Sofia Philharmonic Orchestra conducted by Nayden Todorov, violinist Svetlin Roussev, the group Akaga and the choir of the Tretyakov Gallery.

== Personal life ==
Robeva married a fencer and had a daughter with him, though she and her husband later divorced. She was a close friend of the mystic Baba Vanga before the latter's death.

In 2016, she was awarded the Order of the Balkan Mountains, First Class, although she refused to accept it. She cited a controversy around whether she should be granted the award and said that she did not wish to cause issues for then-president Boyko Borisov, whom she had frequently spoken against in public but who had decided the dispute around the award in favor of granting it to Robeva.
