= 1979 World Rhythmic Gymnastics Championships =

- Location: (United Kingdom) London, Great Britain
- Start date: 4 July 1979
- End date: 5 July 1979

The IX World Rhythmic Gymnastics Championships were held in London, Great Britain on 4 and 5 July 1979.

In the group competition, groups performed their routine with six hoops twice in the qualification round; in both cases, they were scored on both composition and execution. For groups that made the final, their finals performance was judged on execution only. The qualification scores were divided in half and added to the scores from the finals to determine the final ranking.

== Medal table ==
Rank	Nation	Gold	Silver	Bronze	Total
1	Soviet Union (URS)	5	3	2	10
2	Bulgaria (BUL)	2	2	1	5
3	Czechoslovakia (TCH)	1	1	2	4
Totals (3 entries)		8	6	5	19

== Individuals ==
=== Rope ===
Place	Nation	Name	AA Score	AF Score	Total
1	(Bulgaria)	Kristina Guiourova	9.800	9.850	19.650
2	(Soviet Union)	Elena Tomas	9.750	9.800	19.550
3=	(Czechoslovakia)	Iveta Havlíčková	9.750	9.700	19.450
3=	(Czechoslovakia)	Zuzana Záveská	9.750	9.700	19.450
5=	(Bulgaria)	Valentina Ganeva	9.700	9.700	19.400
5=	(North Korea)	Ok Nyo Kim	9.700	9.700	19.400
7=	(Czechoslovakia)	Daniela Bošanská	9.650	9.700	19.350
7=	(Soviet Union)	Irina Deriugina	9.600	9.750	19.350

=== Ball ===
Place	Nation	Name	AA Score	AF Score	Total
1	(Soviet Union)	Irina Gabashvili	9.700	9.750	19.450
2	(Bulgaria)	Iliana Raeva	9.60	9.750	19.350
3	(Soviet Union)	Irina Deriugina	9.600	9.600	19.200
4	(Soviet Union)	Elena Tomas	9.450	9.700	19.150
5	(Japan)	Kumiko Fumoto	9.500	9.600	19.100
6	(West Germany)	Carmen Rischer	9.450	9.600	19.050
7	(Czechoslovakia)	Iveta Havlíčková	9.400	9.500	18.900
8	(West Germany)	Regina Weber	9.500	9.200	18.700

=== Clubs ===
Place	Nation	Name	AA Score	AF Score	Total
1=	(Czechoslovakia)	Daniela Bošanská	9.650	9.650	19.300
1=	(Soviet Union)	Irina Deriugina	9.600	9.700	19.300
1=	(Bulgaria)	Iliana Raeva	9.550	9.750	19.300
4=	(Soviet Union)	Irina Gabashvili	9.500	9.700	19.200
4=	(Bulgaria)	Kristina Guiourova	9.550	9.650	19.200
6	(Czechoslovakia)	Iveta Havlíčková	9.550	9.550	19.100
7=	(West Germany)	Carmen Rischer	9.600	9.450	19.050
7=	(Soviet Union)	Elena Tomas	9.600	9.450	19.050

=== Ribbon ===
Place	Nation	Name	AA Score	AF Score	Total
1	(Soviet Union)	Elena Tomas	9.650	9.700	19.350
2=	(Soviet Union)	Irina Deriugina	9.700	9.600	19.300
2=	(Bulgaria)	Kristina Guiourova	9.600	9.700	19.300
4	(Soviet Union)	Irina Gabashvili	9.500	9.600	19.100
5=	(Bulgaria)	Iliana Raeva	9.450	9.600	19.050
5=	(Japan)	Hideko Unoki	9.450	9.600	19.050
7	(North Korea)	Ok Nyo Kim	9.300	9.600	18.900
8	(West Germany)	Carmen Rischer	9.300	9.500	18.800

=== All-around ===
Place	Nation	Name	Rope	Ball	Clubs	Ribbon	Total
1	(Soviet Union)	Irina Deriugina	9.600	9.600	9.600	9.700	38.500
2	(Soviet Union)	Elena Tomas	9.750	9.450	9.600	9.650	38.450
3	(Soviet Union)	Irina Gabashvili	9.550	9.700	9.500	9.500	38.250
4	(Bulgaria)	Iliana Raeva	9.600	9.600	9.550	9.450	38.200
5	(Bulgaria)	Kristina Guiourova	9.800	9.150	9.550	9.600	38.100
6	(Czechoslovakia)	Iveta Havlíčková	9.750	9.400	9.550	9.250	37.950
7	(West Germany)	Carmen Rischer	9.550	9.450	9.600	9.300	37.900
9	(North Korea)	Ok Nyo Kim	9.700	9.350	9.100	9.300	37.450
9	(Japan)	Hideko Unoki	9.400	9.200	9.400	9.450	37.450
9	(Czechoslovakia)	Zuzana Zaveska	9.750	9.300	9.150	9.250	37.450
...							

== Groups ==
Place	Nation	Score
1	Soviet Union	38.550
2	Czechoslovakia	38.400
3	Bulgaria	38.150
4	Japan	37.850
5	North Korea	37.600
6	Spain	37.200
7	Canada	36.650
8	Italy	36.000
9	Netherlands	35.550
10	Norway	34.850
11=	France	34.500
11=	Hungary	34.500
13	New Zealand	34.300
14	United States	33.700
15	(United Kingdom) Great Britain	33.450
16	Australia	33.300
17	Sweden	33.050
18	Switzerland	32.850
19	Austria	32.650
20	Belgium	31.550
21	Brazil	31.250
22	Mexico	28.350
