= Galima Shugurova =

Soviet rhythmic gymnast (born 1953)

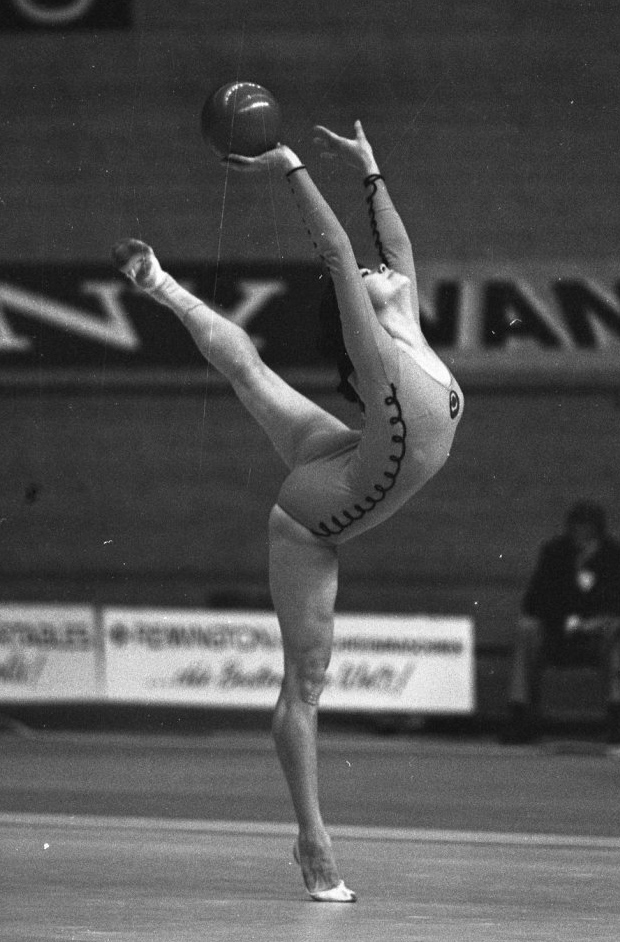
- Shugurova in 1973

Personal information
- Full name: Galima Akhmetkareevna Shugurova
- Alternative name: Galina Shugurova
- Born: 8 November 1953 (age 72) Omsk, Russian SFSR, Soviet Union

Gymnastics career
- Discipline: Rhythmic gymnastics
- Country represented: Soviet Union
- Head coach: Maria Lisitzian
- Eponymous skills: The Shugurova - tipping / spinning a rolling hoop with the feet during a leap
Medal record
Representing Soviet Union
World Championships
Gold medal – first place	1969 Varna	Rope
Gold medal – first place	1969 Varna	Ball
Gold medal – first place	1973 Rotterdam	All-around
Gold medal – first place	1973 Rotterdam	Ball
Gold medal – first place	1973 Rotterdam	Clubs
Gold medal – first place	1973 Rotterdam	Ribbon
Gold medal – first place	1977 Basel	Rope
Gold medal – first place	1977 Basel	Hoop
Gold medal – first place	1977 Basel	Ball
Silver medal – second place	1969 Varna	All-around
Silver medal – second place	1971 Havana	Ball
Silver medal – second place	1977 Basel	All-around
Silver medal – second place	1977 Basel	Ribbon
Bronze medal – third place	1971 Havana	Ribbon
European Championships
Gold medal – first place	1978 Madrid	All-around
Gold medal – first place	1978 Madrid	Rope
Gold medal – first place	1978 Madrid	Ribbon
Silver medal – second place	1978 Madrid	Ball

Galima Akhmetkareevna Shugurova (Russian: Галима Ахметкареевна Шугурова; Tatar: Галима Әхмәтгәрәй кызы Шөгурова; born 8 November 1953 in Omsk, Russian SFSR, Soviet Union) is a retired rhythmic gymnast who competed for the Soviet Union. She is the 1973 World all-around champion and two-time (1969, 1977) World all-around silver medalist. She is the first all-around winner of the European Championships.

== Personal life ==
Shugurova was born to a Siberian Tatar family in the city of Omsk, in western Siberia. She studied history at the Omsk Pedagogical Institute. Shugurova graduated from the Omsk Institute of Physical Training in 1975.

== Career ==
Shugurova was introduced to rhythmic gymnastics when she was nine years old. Initially, she was more attracted to figure skating and choreography classes.

She became a member of the junior national team at 13 and joined the senior national team a year later.

Shugurova debuted on the world stage as a 15-year-old in Varna, Bulgaria at the 1969 World Championships, winning gold medals in rope and ball. At 15, she made her first appearance at the USSR championships, placing second in the all-around. The following year she won a bronze medal in the USSR Cup competition and was also successful in international competitions in the former Yugoslavia, where the journalists voted her the "most engaging" gymnast.

At the 1973 World Championships in Rotterdam, Netherlands, Shurugova shared the world crown in the all-around with Bulgarian Maria Gigova. She also won gold medals in ribbon, ball and clubs. Both of the ribbon routines at this Championship were to the same music – a piece from Georges Bizet's ballet "Carmen".

In 1974, she performed on a Soviet Union national team tour of the United States. Although she was initially assigned to compete at the 1975 World Championships, which were held in Madrid, Spain, due to political issues in the wake of the end of Francoist Spain, the trip was cancelled at the last minute. Shurugova did not compete internationally for two years.

She began to experience lower back pain in 1977 and was diagnosed with osteochondrosis and dysplasia in her spine. Medical treatment was successful, and she won several more gold medals in the event finals at the 1977 World Rhythmic Gymnastics Championships. She was silver in the all-around, which greatly disappointed her, and she was seen crying.

Shurugova was the third Soviet rhythmic gymnast to become world all-around champion—after Ludmila Savinkova (1963) and Elena Karpuchina (1967)—and the first ever European all-around champion in 1978.

== Influence ==
Although apparatus difficulties are not currently officially named in rhythmic gymnastics, Shugurova helped create a new rhythmic gymnastics element named after her. The "Shugurova" consists of tipping or spinning a rolling hoop with the feet during a leap.

== Achievements ==
- First ever winner of the European Championships in 1978.
