= 1973 World Rhythmic Gymnastics Championships =

- Venue: Ahoy Rotterdam
- Location: Rotterdam, Netherlands
- Start date: 15 November 1973
- End date: 18 November 1973

VI World Rhythmic Gymnastics Championships, also known as the Modern Rhythmic Gymnastics Championships, were held from 15 November to 18 November 1973 in Rotterdam, Netherlands.

== Event overview ==
27 countries entered gymnasts; 18 entered groups, and 24 entered individuals. Each country could enter up to three individuals as well as a group, and a total of 63 gymnasts competed in the individual event. Gymnasts from the United States competed for the first time.

Five events were performed: individuals had compulsory clubs and ribbon routines and optional ball and hoop routines, while groups performed a routine with six ropes. The gymnasts with the top six scores on each apparatus entered the event finals. There were two floor areas available for gymnasts to choose to perform on, one harder and one softer.

During the officials' meetings, discussion items included the proposed European Championships and carrying out judges' courses on each continent. Princess Beatrix attended at least the first session.

Maria Gigova won her third consecutive world title, which she shared with Galima Shugurova. Maria Patocska was the only competitor who had competed at every World Championships thus far.

== Medal table ==
Rank	Nation	Gold	Silver	Bronze	Total
1	Soviet Union	5	3	2	10
2	Bulgaria	2	1	4	7
3	Czechoslovakia	0	1	0	1
4	East Germany	0	0	1	1
4	Hungary	0	0	1	1
Totals (5 entries)		7	5	8	20

== Individuals ==
=== Clubs ===
Place	Nation	Name	AA Score	AF Score	Total
1	(Soviet Union)	Galima Shugurova	9.200	9.350	18.550
2	(Soviet Union)	Natalia Krachinnekova	9.050	9.400	18.450
3	(Bulgaria)	Maria Gigova	9.150	9.100	18.250
4	(Czechoslovakia)	Marcela Klingerová	9.050	9.100	18.150
5	(Hungary)	Maria Patocska	8.950	8.950	17.900
6	(Czechoslovakia)	Taťána Krenová	8.950	8.450	17.400

=== Hoop ===
Place	Nation	Name	AA Score	AF Score	Total
1	(Bulgaria)	Maria Gigova	9.650	9.850	19.500
2	(Bulgaria)	Krassimira Filipova	9.500	9.700	19.200
3=	(Bulgaria)	Neshka Robeva			19.050
3=	(Soviet Union)	Natalia Krachinnekova			19.050
3=	(Hungary)	Maria Patocska			19.050
6	(North Korea)	Myung Tschee	9.400	9.300	18.700

Note
Initially, Gigova, Filipova and Robeva were the winners of the gold, silver and bronze medals, respectively. One month after the conclusion of the World Championships, the International Gymnastics Federation revised the results and presented two extra bronze medals to Patocska and Krachinnekova.

=== Ball ===
Place	Nation	Name	AA Score	AF Score	Total
1	(Soviet Union)	Galima Shugurova	9.800	9.900	19.700
2	(Soviet Union)	Natalia Krachinnekova	9.800	9.650	19.450
3	(Bulgaria)	Neshka Robeva	9.500	9.600	19.100
4	(Bulgaria)	Maria Gigova	9.500	9.550	19.050
5	(Bulgaria)	Krassimira Filipova	9.400	9.600	19.000
6	(Hungary)	Maria Patocska	9.350	9.400	18.750

=== Ribbon ===
Place	Nation	Name	AA Score	AF Score	Total
1	(Soviet Union)	Galina Shugurova	9.600	9.750	19.350
2	(Soviet Union)	Natalia Krachinnekova	9.600	9.650	19.250
3	(Bulgaria)	Maria Gigova	9.550	9.600	19.150
4	(Soviet Union)	Galina Schafrova	9.500	9.600	19.100
5	(Bulgaria)	Neshka Robeva	9.350	9.450	18.800
6	(Bulgaria)	Krassimira Filipova	9.350	9.400	18.750

=== Individual All-Around ===
Place	Nation	Name	Clubs	Hoop	Ball	Ribbon	Total
1=	(Bulgaria)	Maria Gigova	9.150	9.650	9.500	9.550	37.850
1=	(Soviet Union)	Galima Shugurova	9.200	9.250	9.800	9.600	37.850
3	(Soviet Union)	Natalia Krachinnekova	9.050	9.350	9.800	9.600	37.800
4	(Bulgaria)	Krassimira Filipova	8.900	9.500	9.400	9.350	37.150
5	(Hungary)	Maria Patocska	8.950	9.500	9.350	9.250	37.050
6	(Bulgaria)	Neshka Robeva	8.700	9.450	9.500	9.350	37.000
7	(Soviet Union)	Galina Schafrova	8.750	9.350	9.250	9.500	36.850
8	(Czechoslovakia)	Taťána Krenová	8.950	9.250	8.950	9.150	36.300
9=	(Czechoslovakia)	Alena Baťková	8.800	9.200	8.800	9.200	36.000
9=	(North Korea)	Myung Tschee	8.350	9.400	8.950	9.300	36.000
11	(North Korea)	Myung Kim	8.600	9.250	8.750	9.250	35.850
12	(East Germany)	Susanne Ebert	8.850	9.150	8.850	8.900	35.750
13=	(East Germany)	Elke Böttger	8.800	8.850	9.050	8.950	35.650
13=	(East Germany)	Sylvia Schneidewind	8.550	9.150	9.050	8.900	35.650
15	(North Korea)	Seun Dje	8.750	9.000	8.850	9.000	35.600
16	(Cuba)	Sonia Pedroso	7.900	9.300	9.050	9.250	35.500
17	(Japan)	Kinue Kobayashi	8.500	9.050	8.800	8.900	35.250
18	(Romania)	Rodica Pintea	8.200	9.100	8.700	9.200	35.200
19=	(Cuba)	Xiomara Ameller	8.350	9.100	8.700	9.000	35.150
19=	(Japan)	Michiya Kurokawa	8.350	8.850	9.200	8.750	35.150
21=	(Poland)	Hanna Anczykowska	8.600	8.650	8.850	8.800	34.900
21=	(West Germany)	Carmen Rischer	8.300	9.000	8.950	8.650	34.900
23	(Poland)	Lucina Czerwinska	8.250	8.950	8.600	8.800	34.600
24	(West Germany)	Jutta Bachmann	7.900	8.850	8.850	8.900	34.500
25	(Socialist Federal Republic of Yugoslavia)	Ivana Obucina	8.600	8.950	8.650	8.200	34.400
26	(Japan)	Yukikao Marumono	8.250	8.300	9.050	8.750	34.350
27	(Czechoslovakia)	Marcela Klingerová	9.050	7.000	9.050	9.200	34.300
28	(Netherlands)	Janny Oost	8.400	8.800	8.400	8.650	34.250
29	(Socialist Federal Republic of Yugoslavia)	Snezana Zorovig	8.250	8.900	8.300	8.550	34.000
30	(Socialist Federal Republic of Yugoslavia)	Wesna Maloparac	8.400	8.800	8.100	8.500	33.800
31	(Netherlands)	Benhy Van Midden	8.300	8.150	8.450	8.550	33.450
32	(Netherlands)	Grietje Molenbuur	8.250	8.250	8.350	8.550	33.400
33=	(Romania)	Christina Sima	8.200	8.300	8.300	8.550	33.350
33=	(France)	Patricia Vanauld	7.700	8.800	8.600	8.250	33.350
35	(Canada)	Denise Fujiwara	8.250	8.500	8.150	8.350	33.250
36	(Sweden)	Eva Ericson	8.050	8.200	8.400	8.550	33.200
37	(France)	Catherine Bucheton	7.800	8.350	8.550	8.400	33.100
38	(Canada)	Shirley Lethinen	7.850	8.450	8.150	8.600	33.050
39	(Belgium)	Gilberte Eeckhout	7.800	8.250	8.250	8.550	32.850
40	(West Germany)	Sybille von Gleich	7.850	8.250	8.000	8.700	32.800
41	(West Germany)	Josette Bellanger	7.950	8.450	8.350	7.900	32.650
42	(Canada)	Donna Kadwell	7.600	8.450	7.900	7.950	31.900
43	(Austria)	Gundi Binder	8.050	8.200	7.200	8.400	31.850
44	(New Zealand)	Janice Heale	7.800	8.250	7.450	7.950	31.450
45	(United States)	? Brumgart	8.000	8.000	7.550	7.700	31.250
46	(Sweden)	Lisbeth Blomdahl	7.450	7.800	7.700	8.100	31.050
47	(Belgium)	Monica de Corte	7.150	7.900	7.600	7.900	30.550
48	(New Zealand)	Dale Mercier	7.000	8.150	7.100	8.150	30.400
49	(United States)	Kathryn Brym	7.300	7.850	6.850	7.900	29.900
50	(Denmark)	Jytte Ulbrandt-Hansen	7.150	7.550	8.000	7.100	29.800
51	(Denmark)	Lotte Tybjerg-Pedersen	7.050	7.300	7.450	7.900	29.700
52	(Belgium)	Brita de Kimpe	7.500	7.700	7.750	6.500	29.450
53	(New Zealand)	Janette Ralph	6.100	8.250	7.050	7.800	29.200
54	(Israel)	Recouvith Bloch	6.050	7.650	7.550	7.600	28.850
55	(Austria)	Edith Haas	6.250	7.850	7.150	7.350	28.600
56	(Israel)	Batia Masnikov	6.350	7.300	7.250	6.950	27.850
57	(Austria)	Ingeborg Werther	5.750	7.100	7.250	7.350	27.450
58	(Spain)	Concha Corrales	5.700	6.650	7.150	6.250	25.750
59	(Spain)	Ernestina Lucea	5.800	6.800	7.150	5.950	25.700
60	(Spain)	Teresa de Isla	5.800	6.500	6.700	6.300	25.300
61	(Mexico)	Romera Lopez	5.100	6.950	6.350	6.650	25.050
62	(Mexico)	Pureco Garcia	4.750	6.850	6.000	6.750	24.350
63	(Mexico)	Miranda Raya	4.000	6.300	5.000	6.600	21.900

== Groups ==
=== Group Final ===
Place	Nation	Preliminary Score	Final Score	Total
1	Soviet Union	18.550	18.950	37.500
2	Czechoslovakia	18.300	18.550	36.850
3	East Germany	17.850	18.750	36.600
4	Italy	18.000	18.400	36.400
5	Bulgaria	18.150	18.150	36.300
6	North Korea	17.650	18.150	35.800

=== Group Preliminary ===
Place	Nation	Score
1	Soviet Union	18.550
2	Czechoslovakia	18.300
3	Bulgaria	18.150
4	Italy	18.000
5	East Germany	17.850
6	North Korea	17.650
7	Japan	17.300
8	Cuba	17.150
9	Netherlands	16.850
10	West Germany	16.600
11	France	16.450
12	Finland	16.100
13	Brazil	16.050
14	Canada	15.850
15	Denmark	15.800
16	Sweden	15.500
17	Austria	14.900
18	Mexico	13.050
