= Rhythmic Gymnastics World Championships =

International rhythmic gymnastics tournament

The Rhythmic Gymnastics World Championships are the world championships for the sport of rhythmic gymnastics. The tournament is promoted and organized by the Fédération Internationale de Gymnastique (FIG). It is one of the three tournaments in rhythmic gymnastics officially organized by FIG, as well as the Rhythmic Gymnastics World Cup and the gymnastics competitions at the Olympic Games (in collaboration with the IOC and the federation of the country organising the Games). The first edition of the World Championships was held in 1963, a time when the sport was known as modern gymnastics. The current program of the World Championships contemplates both individual and group performances. In even non-Olympic years and the year before the Olympics, a team event is also contested. Two events are not competed at the World Championships anymore: individual rope and free hands.

Historically rhythmic gymnastics has been dominated by Eastern European countries, especially the Soviet Union and Bulgaria. Following the fall of the Soviet Union, there was originally a clear dominance of Bulgaria and post-Soviet countries at the World Championships, namely Russia, Ukraine and Belarus but with other nations emerging, for example Italy and Spain. The only non-European nations to successfully achieve medal positions at the World Championships are Japan, North Korea, China, South Korea, Brazil and the United States. Only six individual gymnasts (Sun Duk Jo, Myong Sim Choi, Mitsuru Hiraguchi, Son Yeon-jae, Kaho Minagawa and Rin Keys) and four groups (Japan, North Korea, China and Brazil) from outside Europe have won medals at the senior World Championships.

== Editions ==
Year	Games	Host city	Country	Events	First in the Medal Table	Second in the Medal Table	Third in the Medal Table	Comments
1963	1	Budapest	Hungary	3	Soviet Union	Bulgaria	—N/a	(individuals only)
1965	2	Prague	Czechoslovakia	3	Czechoslovakia	Soviet Union	—N/a	(individuals only)
1967	3	Copenhagen	Denmark	5	Soviet Union	Czechoslovakia	Bulgaria	
1969	4	Varna	Bulgaria	6	Bulgaria	Soviet Union	Czechoslovakia	
1971	5	Havana	Cuba	6	Bulgaria	Soviet Union	North Korea	
1973	6	Rotterdam	Netherlands	6	Soviet Union	Bulgaria	Czechoslovakia	
1975	7	Madrid	Spain	6	West Germany	Japan	Italy	
1977	8	Basel	Switzerland	6	Soviet Union	Bulgaria Czechoslovakia	—N/a	
1979	9	London	Great Britain	6	Soviet Union	Bulgaria	Czechoslovakia	
1981	10	Munich	West Germany	6	Bulgaria	Soviet Union	Czechoslovakia	
1983	11	Strasbourg	France	6	Bulgaria	Soviet Union	North Korea	
1985	12	Valladolid	Spain	6	Bulgaria	Soviet Union	North Korea	
1987	13	Varna	Bulgaria	8	Bulgaria	Soviet Union	China	
1989	14	Sarajevo	Yugoslavia	9	Soviet Union	Bulgaria	Spain	
1991	15	Piraeus	Greece	9	Soviet Union	Spain	Bulgaria	
1992	16	Brussels	Belgium	8	Russia	Belarus	Bulgaria	
1993	17	Alicante	Spain	7	Bulgaria	Ukraine	Spain	(individuals only)
1994	18	Paris	France	8	Ukraine	Bulgaria	Russia	
1995	19	Vienna	Austria	9	Bulgaria	Russia	Ukraine	
1996	20	Budapest	Hungary	7	Ukraine	Belarus	Russia	
1997	21	Berlin	Germany	6	Ukraine	Russia	Belarus	(individuals only)
1998	22	Seville	Spain	3	Belarus	Spain	Russia	(groups only)
1999	23	Osaka	Japan	9	Russia	Greece	Ukraine	
2001	24	Madrid	Spain	6	Ukraine	Bulgaria	Belarus	(individuals only)
2002	25	New Orleans	United States	3	Russia	Greece	Ukraine	(groups only)
2003	26	Budapest	Hungary	9	Russia	Ukraine	Bulgaria	
2005	27	Baku	Azerbaijan	9	Russia	Italy	Bulgaria	
2007	28	Patras	Greece	9	Russia	Ukraine	Italy	
2009	29	Ise	Japan	9	Russia	Italy	Belarus	
2010	30	Moscow	Russia	9	Russia	Italy	Belarus	
2011	31	Montpellier	France	9	Russia	Italy	Bulgaria	
2013	32	Kyiv	Ukraine	8	Russia	Ukraine	Belarus	
2014	33	İzmir	Turkey	9	Russia	Bulgaria	Spain	
2015	34	Stuttgart	Germany	9	Russia	Italy	Belarus	
2017	35	Pesaro	Italy	8	Russia	Italy	Japan	
2018	36	Sofia	Bulgaria	9	Russia	Italy	Bulgaria	
2019	37	Baku	Azerbaijan	9	Russia	Japan	Israel	
2021	38	Kitakyushu	Japan	9	RGF ^{[a]}	Italy	Belarus	
2022	39	Sofia	Bulgaria	9	Italy	Bulgaria	Germany	
2023	40	Valencia	Spain	9	Germany	Israel	Bulgaria	
2025	41	Rio de Janeiro	Brazil	9	Germany	Japan	Italy Ukraine	
2026	42	Frankfurt	Germany	9	Germany	Brazil	Bulgaria	
2027	43	Baku	Azerbaijan	Future event				

== Medalists ==
Dominant nations include the Soviet Union and subsequent post-Soviet states, namely Russia, Ukraine, Belarus and Azerbaijan, and Bulgaria.

=== Individual All-Around ===
Individual All-Around Medalists
Year	Location	Gold	Silver	Bronze
1963	Budapest, Hungary	(Soviet Union) Ludmila Savinkova	(Soviet Union) Tatiana Kravtchenko	(Bulgaria) Julia Trashlieva
1965	Prague, Czechoslovakia	(Czechoslovakia) Hana Mičechová	(Soviet Union) Tatiana Kravtchenko	(Czechoslovakia) Hana Machatová-Bogušovská
1967	Copenhagen, Denmark	(Soviet Union) Elena Karpukhina	(East Germany) Ute Lehmann	(Soviet Union) Liubov Sereda
1969	Varna, Bulgaria	(Bulgaria) Maria Gigova	(Bulgaria) Neshka Robeva (Soviet Union) Liubov Sereda (Soviet Union) Galima Shugurova	—N/a
1971	Havana, Cuba	(Bulgaria) Maria Gigova	(Soviet Union) Elena Karpukhina	(Soviet Union) Alfia Nazmutdinova
1973	Rotterdam, Netherlands	(Bulgaria) Maria Gigova (Soviet Union) Galima Shugurova	—N/a	(Soviet Union) Natalia Krachinnekova
1975	Madrid, Spain	(West Germany) Carmen Rischer	(West Germany) Christiana Rosenberg	(Spain) María Jesús Alegre
1977	Basel, Switzerland	(Soviet Union) Irina Deriugina	(Soviet Union) Galima Shugurova	(Bulgaria) Kristina Guiourova
1979	(United Kingdom) London, Great Britain	(Soviet Union) Irina Deriugina	(Soviet Union) Elena Tomas	(Soviet Union) Irina Gabashvili
1981	Munich, West Germany	(Bulgaria) Anelia Ralenkova	(Bulgaria) Lilia Ignatova (Bulgaria) Iliana Raeva	—N/a
1983	Strasbourg, France	(Bulgaria) Diliana Georgieva	(Soviet Union) Galina Beloglazova (Bulgaria) Lilia Ignatova (Bulgaria) Anelia Ralenkova	—N/a
1985	Valladolid, Spain	(Bulgaria) Diliana Georgieva	(Bulgaria) Lilia Ignatova	(Bulgaria) Bianka Panova
1987	Varna, Bulgaria	(Bulgaria) Bianka Panova	(Bulgaria) Adriana Dunavska (Bulgaria) Elizabeth Koleva	—N/a
1989	(Socialist Federal Republic of Yugoslavia) Sarajevo, Yugoslavia	(Soviet Union) Alexandra Timoshenko	(Bulgaria) Bianka Panova	(Bulgaria) Adriana Dunavska (Soviet Union) Oksana Skaldina
1991	Piraeus, Greece	(Soviet Union) Oksana Skaldina	(Soviet Union) Alexandra Timoshenko	(Bulgaria) Mila Marinova
1992	Brussels, Belgium	(Russia) Oksana Kostina	(Bulgaria) Maria Petrova	(Belarus) Larisa Lukyanenko
1993	Alicante, Spain	(Bulgaria) Maria Petrova	(Ukraine) Kateryna Serebrianska	(Russia) Amina Zaripova
1994	Paris, France	(Bulgaria) Maria Petrova	(Belarus) Larisa Lukyanenko (Russia) Amina Zaripova	—N/a
1995	Vienna, Austria	(Bulgaria) Maria Petrova (Ukraine) Kateryna Serebrianska	—N/a	(Russia) Yana Batyrshina (Belarus) Larissa Lukyanenko
1997	Berlin, Germany	(Ukraine) Olena Vitrychenko	(Russia) Natalia Lipkovskaya	(Russia) Yana Batyrshina
1999	Osaka, Japan	(Russia) Alina Kabaeva	(Belarus) Yulia Raskina	(Russia) Yulia Barsukova
2001	Madrid, Spain	(Ukraine) Tamara Yerofeeva	(Bulgaria) Simona Peycheva	(Ukraine) Anna Bessonova
2003	Budapest, Hungary	(Russia) Alina Kabaeva	(Ukraine) Anna Bessonova	(Russia) Irina Tchachina
2005	Baku, Azerbaijan	(Russia) Olga Kapranova	(Ukraine) Anna Bessonova	(Russia) Irina Tchachina
2007	Patras, Greece	(Ukraine) Anna Bessonova	(Russia) Vera Sessina	(Russia) Olga Kapranova
2009	Mie, Japan	(Russia) Evgeniya Kanaeva	(Russia) Daria Kondakova	(Ukraine) Anna Bessonova
2010	Moscow, Russia	(Russia) Evgeniya Kanaeva	(Russia) Daria Kondakova	(Belarus) Melitina Staniouta
2011	Montpellier, France	(Russia) Evgeniya Kanaeva	(Russia) Daria Kondakova	(Azerbaijan) Aliya Garayeva
2013	Kyiv, Ukraine	(Russia) Yana Kudryavtseva	(Ukraine) Ganna Rizatdinova	(Belarus) Melitina Staniouta
2014	İzmir, Turkey	(Russia) Yana Kudryavtseva	(Russia) Margarita Mamun	(Ukraine) Ganna Rizatdinova
2015	Stuttgart, Germany	(Russia) Yana Kudryavtseva	(Russia) Margarita Mamun	(Belarus) Melitina Staniouta
2017	Pesaro, Italy	(Russia) Dina Averina	(Russia) Arina Averina	(Israel) Linoy Ashram
2018	Sofia, Bulgaria	(Russia) Dina Averina	(Israel) Linoy Ashram	(Russia) Aleksandra Soldatova
2019	Baku, Azerbaijan	(Russia) Dina Averina	(Russia) Arina Averina	(Israel) Linoy Ashram
2021	Kitakyushu, Japan	RGF Dina Averina	(Belarus) Alina Harnasko	RGF Arina Averina
2022	Sofia, Bulgaria	(Italy) Sofia Raffaeli	(Germany) Darja Varfolomeev	(Bulgaria) Stiliana Nikolova
2023	Valencia, Spain	(Germany) Darja Varfolomeev	(Italy) Sofia Raffaeli	(Israel) Daria Atamanov
2025	Rio de Janeiro, Brazil	(Germany) Darja Varfolomeev	(Bulgaria) Stiliana Nikolova	(Italy) Sofia Raffaeli
2026	Frankfurt, Germany	(Germany) Darja Varfolomeev	(Bulgaria) Stiliana Nikolova	(Italy) Sofia Raffaeli
2027	Baku, Azerbaijan	Future event		

=== Group All-Around ===
Group All-Around Medalists
Year	Location	Gold	Silver	Bronze
1967	Copenhagen, Denmark	Soviet Union	Czechoslovakia	Bulgaria
1969	Varna, Bulgaria	Bulgaria	Soviet Union	Czechoslovakia
1971	Havana, Cuba	Bulgaria	Soviet Union	Italy
1973	Rotterdam, Netherlands	Soviet Union	Czechoslovakia	East Germany
1975	Madrid, Spain	Italy	Japan	Spain
1977	Basel, Switzerland	Soviet Union	Bulgaria	Czechoslovakia
1979	(United Kingdom) London, Great Britain	Soviet Union	Czechoslovakia	Bulgaria
1981	Munich, West Germany	Bulgaria	Soviet Union	Czechoslovakia
1983	Strasbourg, France	Bulgaria	Soviet Union	North Korea
1985	Valladolid, Spain	Bulgaria	North Korea; Soviet Union	—N/a
1987	Varna, Bulgaria	Bulgaria	Soviet Union	China; Spain
1989	(Socialist Federal Republic of Yugoslavia) Sarajevo, Yugoslavia	Bulgaria	Soviet Union	Spain
1991	Piraeus, Greece	Spain	Soviet Union	North Korea
1992	Brussels, Belgium	Russia	Spain	North Korea
1994	Paris, France	Russia	Spain	Bulgaria
1995	Vienna, Austria	Bulgaria	Spain	Belarus
1996	Budapest, Hungary	Bulgaria	Spain	Belarus
1998	Seville, Spain	Belarus	Spain	Russia
1999	Osaka, Japan	Russia	Greece	Belarus
2002	New Orleans, United States	Russia	Belarus	Greece
2003	Budapest, Hungary	Russia	Bulgaria	Belarus
2005	Baku, Azerbaijan	Russia	Italy	Belarus
2007	Patras, Greece	Russia	Italy	Belarus
2009	Mie, Japan	Italy	Belarus	Russia
2010	Moscow, Russia	Italy	Belarus	Russia
2011	Montpellier, France	Italy	Russia	Bulgaria
2013	Kyiv, Ukraine	Belarus	Italy	Russia
2014	İzmir, Turkey	Bulgaria	Italy	Belarus
2015	Stuttgart, Germany	Russia	Bulgaria	Spain
2017	Pesaro, Italy	Russia	Bulgaria	Japan
2018	Sofia, Bulgaria	Russia	Italy	Bulgaria
2019	Baku, Azerbaijan	Russia	Japan	Bulgaria
2021	Kitakyushu, Japan	RGF	Italy	Belarus
2022	Sofia, Bulgaria	Bulgaria	Israel	Spain
2023	Valencia, Spain	Israel	China	Spain
2025	Rio de Janeiro, Brazil	Japan	Brazil	Spain
2026	Frankfurt, Germany	Spain	Japan	Brazil
2027	Baku, Azerbaijan	Future event		

== All-time medal table ==
Last updated after the 2026 World Championships.

Rank	Nation	Gold	Silver	Bronze	Total
1	Russia	113	57	35	205
2	Bulgaria	71	68	57	196
3	Soviet Union	50	43	27	120
4	Ukraine	27	29	42	98
5	Italy	17	25	17	59
6	Germany	14	4	3	21
7	Belarus	10	28	41	79
8	Spain	8	13	24	45
9	Russian Gymnastics Federation ^{[a]}	7	4	2	13
10	West Germany	5	5	0	10
11	Czechoslovakia	4	5	8	17
12	Japan	3	7	6	16
13	Greece	3	1	2	6
14	Israel	2	9	8	19
15	China	2	4	4	10
16	Brazil	2	2	1	5
17	North Korea	1	2	4	7
18	(Individual Neutral Athletes) World Gymnastics	1	1	3	5
19	Azerbaijan	0	1	8	9
20	East Germany	0	1	3	4
21	Romania	0	1	1	2
22	United States	0	1	0	1
23	France	0	0	2	2
23	Hungary	0	0	2	2
23	Slovenia	0	0	2	2
26	South Korea	0	0	1	1
Totals (26 entries)		340	311	303	954

- ^[a] At the 2021 Rhythmic Gymnastics World Championships in Kitakyushu, Japan, in accordance with a ban by the World Anti-Doping Agency (WADA) and a decision by the Court of Arbitration for Sport (CAS), athletes from Russia were not permitted to use the Russian name, flag, or anthem. They instead participated under name and flag of the RGF (Russian Gymnastics Federation).

== Multiple gold medalists ==
Boldface denotes active rhythmic gymnasts and highest medal count among all rhythmic gymnasts (including these who not included in these tables) per type.

=== All events ===
Rank	Rhythmic gymnast	Country	From	To	Gold	Silver	Bronze	Total
1	Dina Averina	Russia; Russian Gymnastics Federation	2017	2021	**18**	3	1	22
2	Evgeniya Kanaeva	Russia	2007	2011	17	1	–	18
3	**Darja Varfolomeev**	Germany	2022	2026	14	4	2	20
4	Yana Kudryavtseva	Russia	2013	2015	13	3	–	16
5	Maria Tolkacheva	Russia; Russian Gymnastics Federation	2014	2021	11	4	1	16
6	Alexandra Timoshenko	Soviet Union	1989	1991	10	2	–	12
7	Olga Kapranova	Russia	2003	2009	10	1	1	12
8	Maria Petrova	Bulgaria	1991	1996	9	9	4	22
9	Olena Vitrychenko	Ukraine	1992	1999	9	7	7	23
10	Galima Shugurova	Soviet Union	1969	1977	9	4	1	14

=== Individual events ===
Rank	Rhythmic gymnast	Country	From	To	Gold	Silver	Bronze	Total
1	Dina Averina	Russia; Russian Gymnastics Federation	2017	2021	**15**	3	1	19
2	**Darja Varfolomeev**	Germany	2022	2026	13	2	2	17
3	Evgeniya Kanaeva	Russia	2009	2011	13	1	–	14
4	Yana Kudryavtseva	Russia	2013	2015	11	3	–	14
5	Olena Vitrychenko	Ukraine	1993	1999	9	5	4	18
6	Galima Shugurova	Soviet Union	1969	1977	9	4	1	14
7	Maria Gigova	Bulgaria	1967	1973	9	2	2	13
8	Maria Petrova	Bulgaria	1992	1996	8	7	4	19
9	Kateryna Serebrianska	Ukraine	1993	1996	8	4	3	15
10	Bianka Panova	Bulgaria	1985	1989	8	2	1	11

=== Records ===
Category	All events	Individual events
Most medals	(Ukraine) Anna Bessonova : 27 medals (5 gold, 15 silver and 7 bronze)	(Ukraine) Anna Bessonova : 22 medals (3 gold, 13 silver and 6 bronze)

== See also ==
- Official FIG competitions
  - Gymnastics at the Summer Olympics
  - Gymnastics at the World Games
  - Rhythmic Gymnastics World Cup
- Other major competitions
  - African Rhythmic Gymnastics Championships
  - Asian Gymnastics Championships
  - Pan American Gymnastics Championships
  - Rhythmic Gymnastics European Championships
  - Rhythmic Gymnastics Grand Prix
