= Rhythmic gymnastics =

Gymnastics discipline

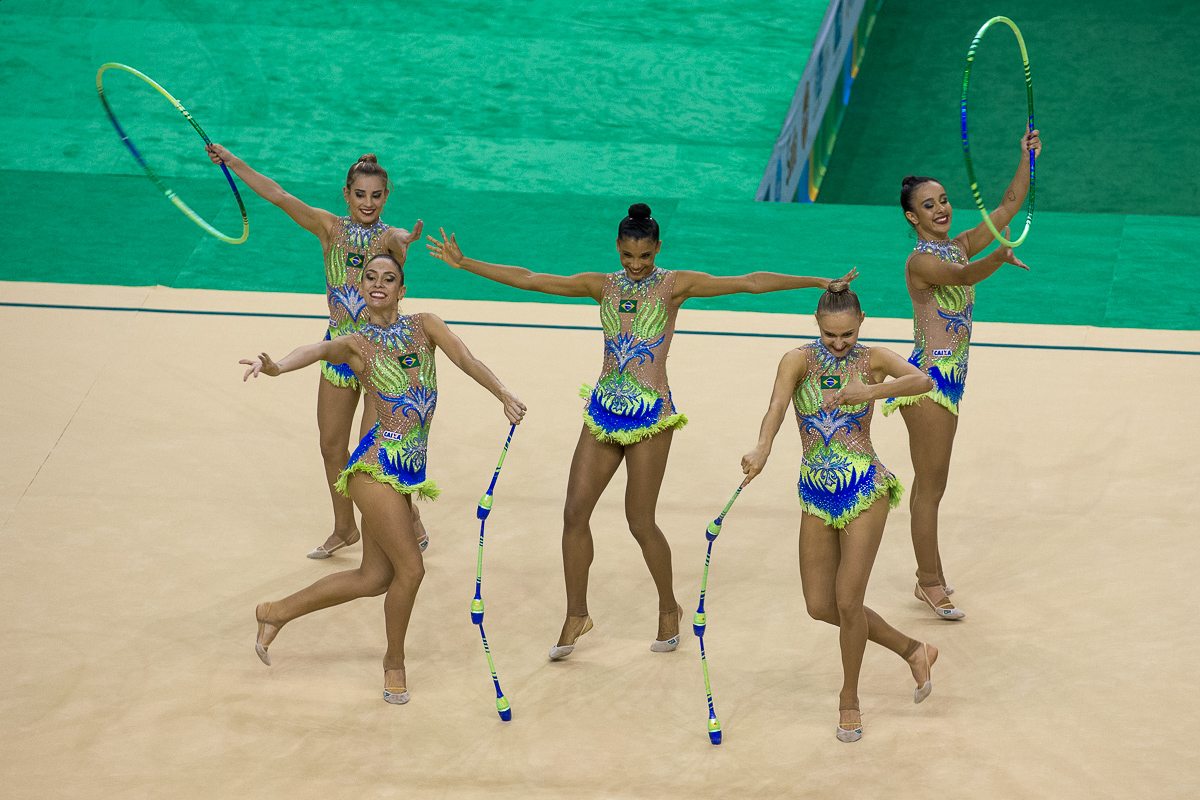
- A group (Brazil) competes with two hoops and three pairs of clubs
- Highest governing body: World Gymnastics

Characteristics
- Contact: No
- Mixed-sex: No
- Type: Gymnastic sport that involves artistic movement

Presence
- Country or region: Worldwide
- Olympic: Since 1984
- World Games: 2001 – 2021

Rhythmic gymnastics is a sport in which gymnasts perform individually or in groups on a floor with an apparatus: hoop, ball, clubs, ribbon and rope. The sport combines elements of gymnastics, dance and calisthenics; gymnasts must be strong, flexible, agile, dexterous and coordinated. Rhythmic gymnastics is governed by World Gymnastics, which first recognized it as a sport in 1963. At the international level, rhythmic gymnastics is a women-only sport.

Rhythmic gymnastics became an Olympic sport in 1984, when the individual all-around event was first competed, and the group competition was added to the Olympics in 1996. World Gymnastics-recognized competitions, besides the Olympic Games, include the World Championships, continental championships (European Championships, Asian Championships, Pan American Championships, African Championships, and Oceanian Championships), and the World Cup series. At competitions, gymnasts are judged on their artistry, execution of skills, and difficulty of skills. They perform leaps, balances, and rotations (spins) along with handling the apparatus.

== History ==
=== Aesthetic gymnastics ===
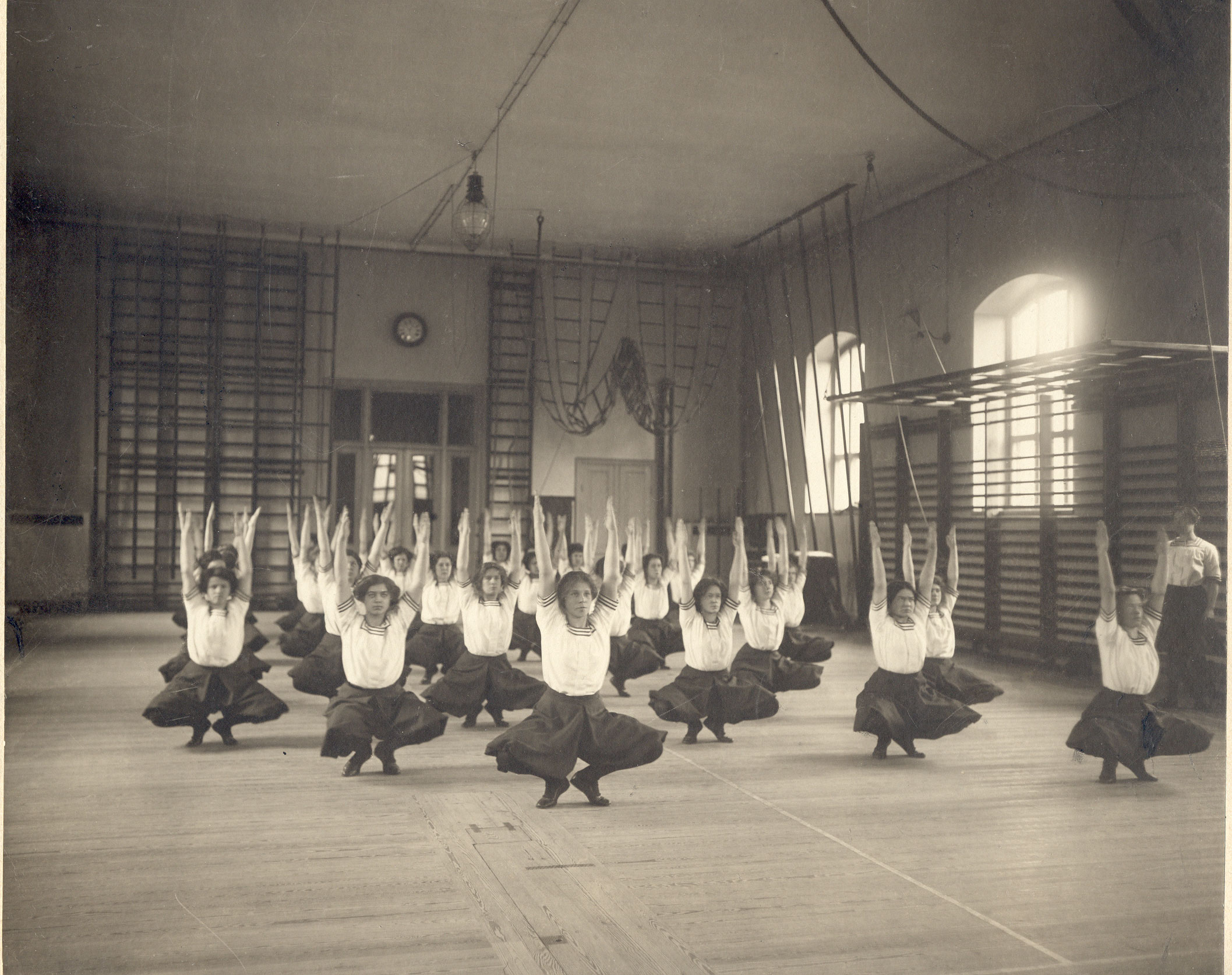
Pehr Henrik Ling's "aesthetic gymnastics" at the Gymnastic Central Institute, Stockholm, Sweden, c. 1910

Rhythmic gymnastics grew out of the ideas of Jean-Georges Noverre (1727–1810), François Delsarte (1811–1871), and Rudolf Bode (1881–1970), who all believed in movement expression, where one used to dance to express oneself and exercise various body parts. From 1834, Pehr Henrik Ling further developed this idea in his 19th-century Swedish system of free exercise, which promoted "aesthetic gymnastics", in which students expressed their feelings and emotions through body movement.

Swedish-style group gymnastics became increasingly popular for women from the mid-19th century through to the early 20th century. Although sports became associated with masculinity, group gymnastics were performed in indoor, private spaces and focused on correctly performing movements before an instructor, which fit societal ideals for women. Women's gymnastics began to focus on qualities perceived as feminine, such as grace and expressiveness.

Ling's ideas were extended by Catharine Beecher, who founded the Western Female Institute in Cincinnati, Ohio, United States, in 1837. She developed a program where pupils exercised to music, moving from simple calisthenics that could be done in a classroom to more strenuous activities. While she promoted the exercises as being for all children, she emphasized that girls were especially lacking in exercise and that their health suffered for it.

=== Harmonic gymnastics ===
François Delsarte created a system of movement which was focused on creating expressive acting with natural poses, but it became a popular form of women's gymnastics for developing grace. In 1885, an American student of Delsarte, Genevieve Stebbins, published her first book, The Delsarte System of Expression. She soon began to perform popular solo dances, and she went on to combine Delsarte's ideas with Ling's and to develop her own gymnastics system. Dubbed "harmonic gymnastics", it encouraged late nineteenth-century American women to engage in physical culture and expression, in defiance of traditional gender norms. Stebbins provided the means, rationale, and model for exercise for middle-class women.

During the 1880s, Émile Jaques-Dalcroze of Switzerland developed eurhythmics, a form of physical training for musicians and dancers. Robert Bode trained at the Dalcroze Eurythmic College and went on to found his own school. George Demeny of France created exercises to music that were designed to promote grace of movement, muscular flexibility, and good posture, and some exercises included apparatuses.

The dancer Isadora Duncan was significant in the development of rhythmic gymnastics. Influenced by Delsarte, Jaques-Dalcroze, and possibly by Stebbins, she developed her own theory of dance that departed from more rigid traditions like that of ballet. Her free dancing style incorporated running and jumping movements.

=== Modern gymnastics ===
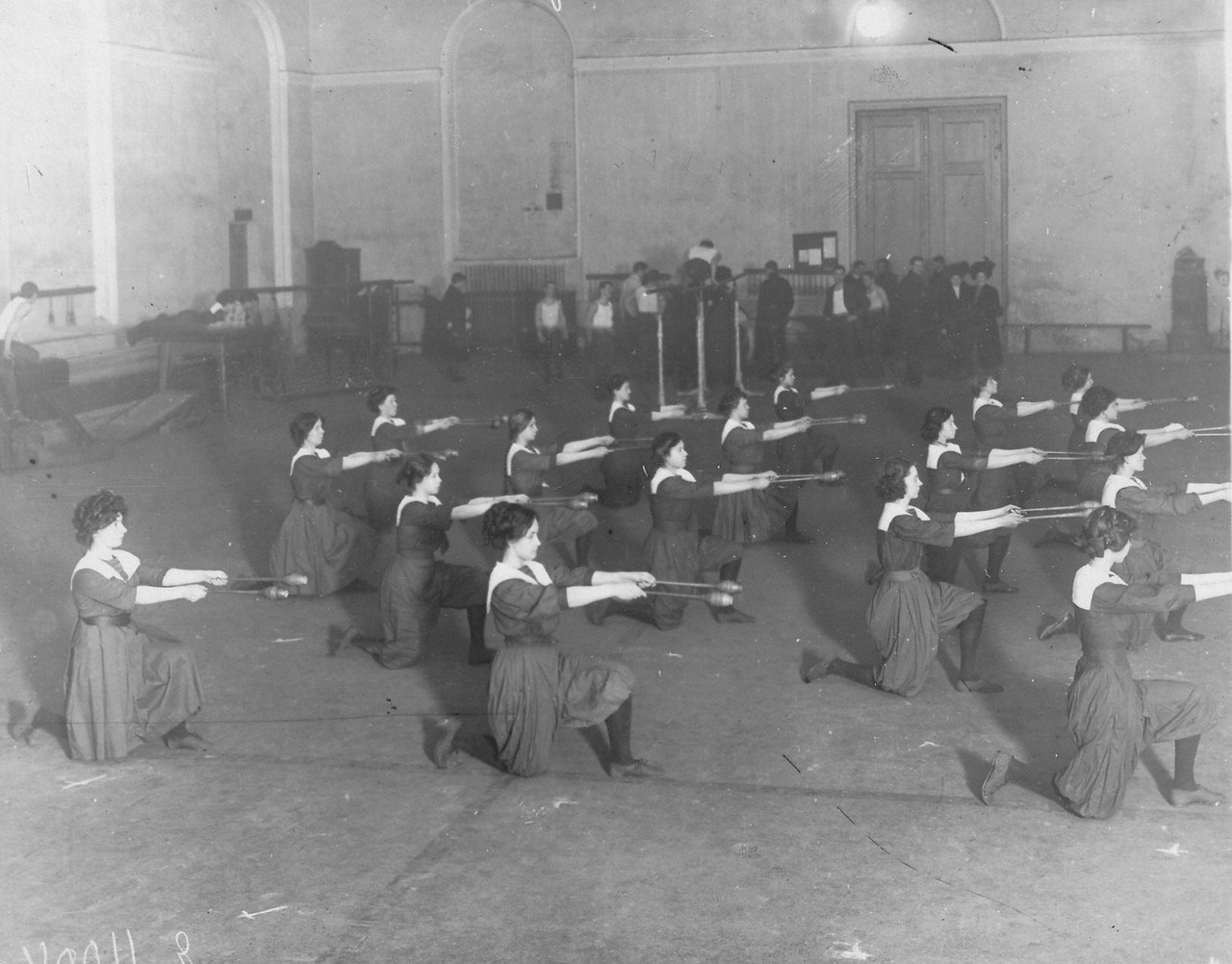
Women gymnasts training with clubs in Russia in 1912

In 1929, Hinrich Medau, who graduated from the Bode School, founded The Medau School in Berlin to train gymnasts in "modern gymnastics". He focused on using the entire body in movement and developed the use of apparatuses, particularly balls, hoops, and clubs. Influenced by German teachers, several Finnish and Swedish gymnastics teachers, such as Elli Björkstén, Elin Falk, and Maja Carlquist, began to develop their own system of gymnastics. They felt the Ling approach was too rigid and dull and sought freer styles of movements. Scandinavian gymnastics emphasized developing partner and group work and use of apparatuses, and many Scandinavian gymnastics groups toured abroad.

The teachings of Duncan, Jacques-Dalcroze, Delsarte, and Demeny were brought together at the Soviet Union's High School of Artistic Movement when it was founded in 1932, and soon thereafter, an early version of rhythmic gymnastics was established as a sport for girls. The first competition was held in 1939 in Leningrad on International Women's Day. Beginning in 1947, All-Soviet Union competitions were held yearly in various locations across the Soviet Union, and the sport began to spread to other countries in Europe.

From 1928 through 1956, group events with apparatuses were sometimes performed as events in women's artistic gymnastics, such as club performances at the World Artistic Gymnastics Championships. There were two team portable apparatus events at the 1952 and 1956 Olympics, which used similar apparatuses to modern rhythmic gymnastics, before it was decided that it should be a separate discipline. The portable apparatus events were only performed as a group and lasted between four and five minutes, much longer than a modern group routine. They were performed to music, and the rules did not specify the apparatuses used, only that each gymnast should have one and that they did not need to be all the same.

=== Rhythmic gymnastics ===
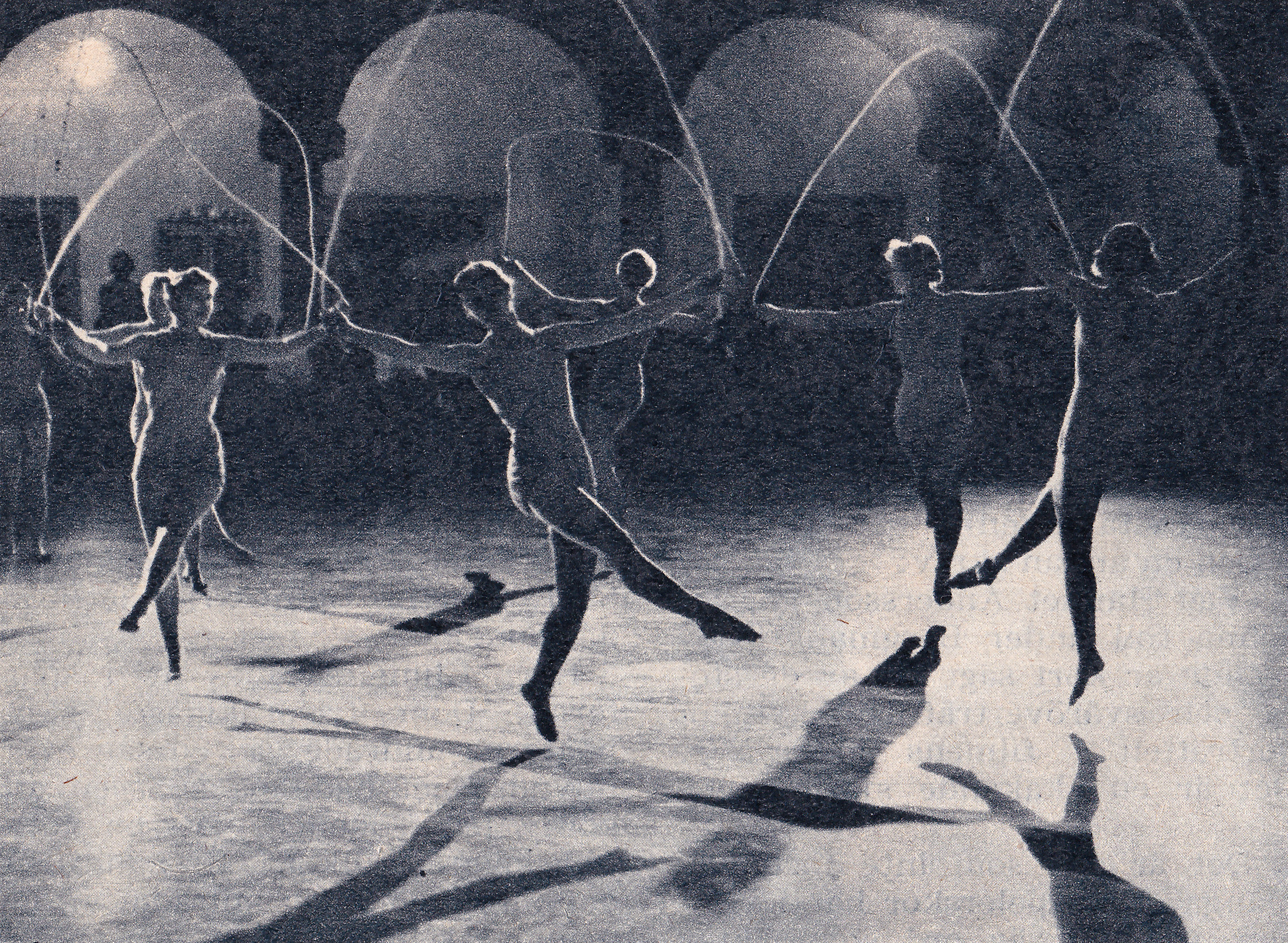
The "Idla Girls", a Swedish rhythmic gymnastics group, performing in 1958

World Gymnastics (abbreviated FIG, as it was previously named the Fédération Internationale de Gymnastique, or International Gymnastics Federation) formally recognized rhythmic gymnastics as its own discipline in 1962, first as modern gymnastics. Its name was changed to modern rhythmic gymnastics, then again to rhythmic sportive gymnastics, and finally to rhythmic gymnastics.

The first World Championships for individual rhythmic gymnasts was held in 1963 in Budapest. Groups were introduced at the same level in 1967 in Copenhagen, Denmark. The FIG first requested that rhythmic gymnastics be added to the Olympics in 1972. It was painted as a more feminine counterpart to women's artistic gymnastics, where increasingly difficult tumbling led to a perceived masculinization of the sport. However, the International Olympic Committee initially refused the request.

Rhythmic gymnastics debuted as an Olympic sport at the 1984 Summer Olympics in Los Angeles with the individual all-around competition. However, many federations from the Eastern Bloc and countries were forced to boycott by the Soviet Union, in a way similar to the boycott forced on many nations by the United States of the 1980 Moscow Summer Olympics. Canadian Lori Fung was the first rhythmic gymnast to earn an Olympic gold medal. The group competition was added to the 1996 Summer Olympics in Atlanta. The Spanish group won the first gold medal of the new competition with a group formed by Estela Giménez, Marta Baldó, Nuria Cabanillas, Lorena Guréndez, Estíbaliz Martínez and Tania Lamarca.

== The gymnast ==
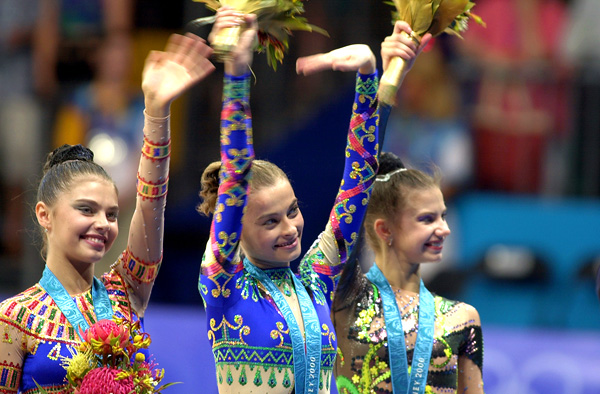
From left: Alina Kabaeva (bronze), Yulia Barsukova (gold) and Yulia Raskina (silver) at the 2000 Sydney Olympics

International competitive rhythmic gymnastics is restricted to female participants. However, men's rhythmic gymnastics has a history in Japan as its own sport that was originally performed by both men and women. In France, men are allowed to participate in lower-level national competitions, while in Spain, there is a national rhythmic gymnastics championships for men and mixed-sex group competitions. A men's program has yet to be formally recognized by the FIG.

Gymnasts start at a young age; it is considered an early specialization sport. They become age-eligible to compete in the Olympic Games and other major senior international competitions on January 1 of their 16th year. Rhythmic gymnasts have historically tended to peak at a slightly later age than artistic gymnasts. In the late 90s and early 2000s, Olympic rhythmic gymnasts were on average a year older than Olympic artistic gymnasts, and gymnasts increasingly began to compete through their 20s. The median age of gymnasts competing at the 2021 continental championships was in the late teens, with the African Championships and Oceania Championships skewing slightly younger, while the median ages of event finalists at the European Championships and Pan American Championships were in the early 20s.

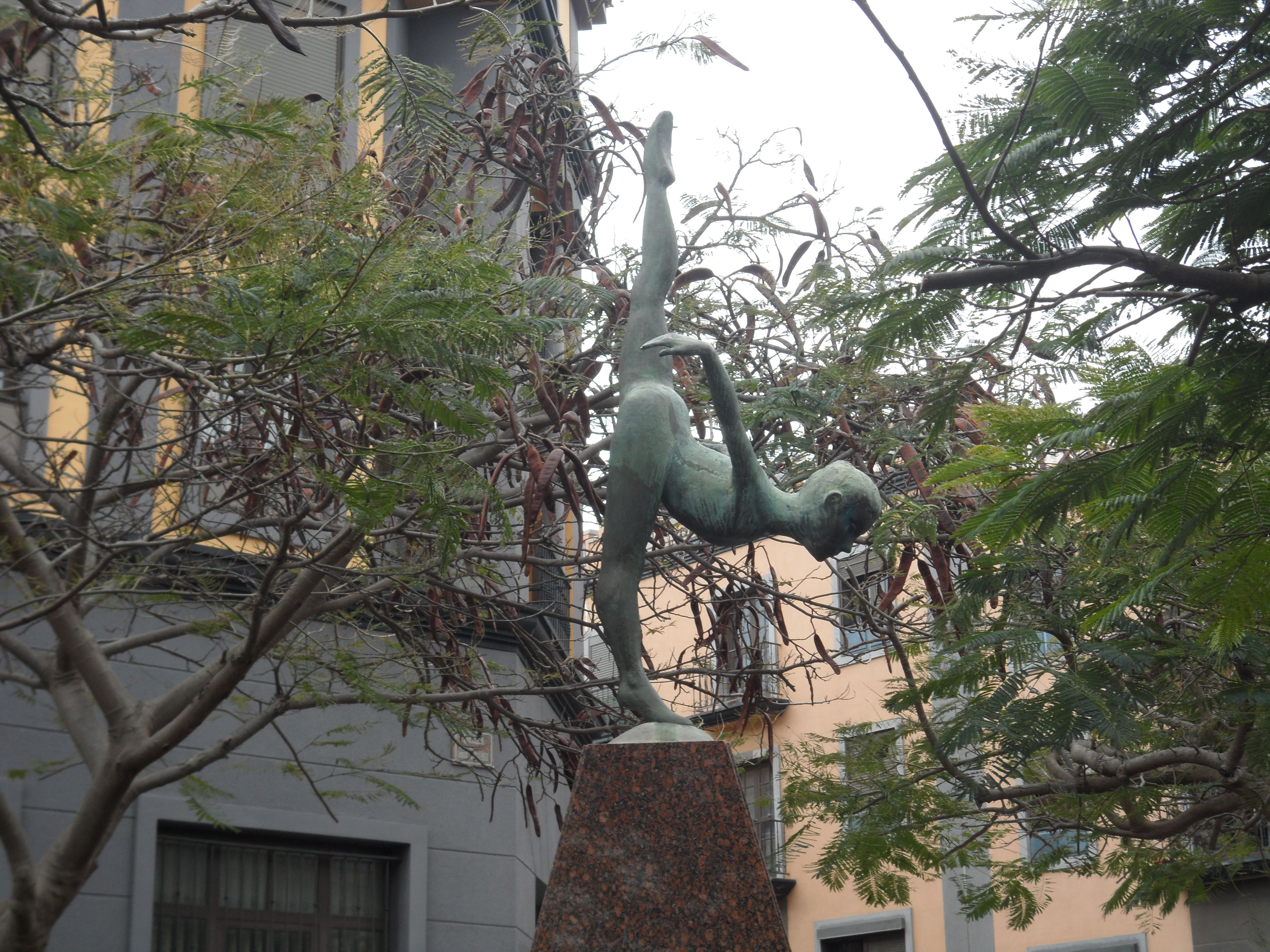
Sculpture of Ana Bautista by Fernando Garcíarramos in San Cristóbal de La Laguna

Top rhythmic gymnasts must have good balance, flexibility, coordination, and strength. A gymnast can perform in the individual event or in the group event. Groups consist of five gymnasts since 1995; prior to that, they were composed of six.

== Apparatus ==
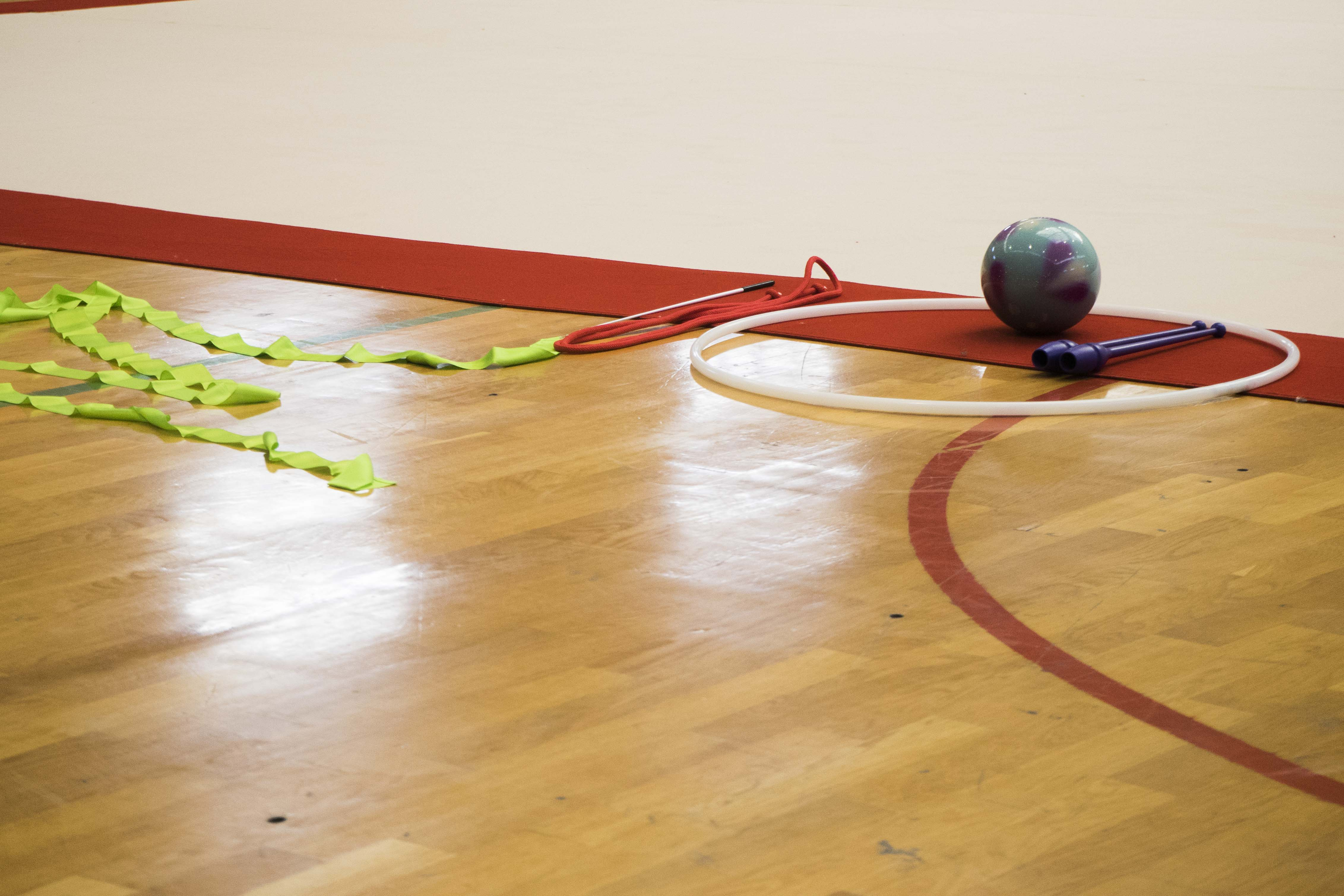
Replacement apparatuses at the side of the floor

The hoop, rope, and ball were the first official apparatuses, with the ribbon being added in 1971 and the clubs in 1973. Historically, four out of the five possible apparatuses were selected by the FIG to be used by individual gymnasts each season. Each exercise takes place on a 13 metres (43 ft) x 13 metres (43 ft) floor. The floor is carpeted but has no springs, unlike the one used for floor exercise in artistic gymnastics. Replacement apparatuses are placed on two sides of the floor and can be taken to continue the exercise if the gymnast's apparatus becomes unusable or is lost outside the floor area.

After 2011, rope began to be transitioned out of the sport, with the FIG saying that it was less visually appealing than the other apparatus. It was removed from the senior individual program, and the most recent usage of rope in the senior program was for the mixed apparatus group exercise in 2017. The FIG planned to drop rope in junior-level individual competition, but it returned in 2015; it was then announced that rope would be used in junior individual competition in some years through at least the 2023–2024 season, but the 2022–2024 Code of Points dropped it again. It continues to be used for junior groups.

Routines performed without any apparatus are known as freehand. Freehand was an event for the four first World Championships before being dropped, with the reasoning being that the freehand exercises tended to be too theatrical and include too many ballet elements.

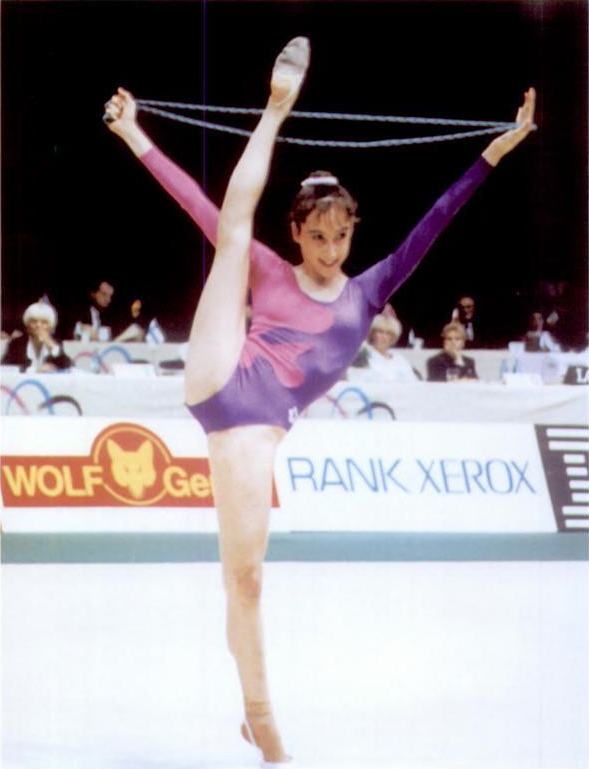
Mónica Ferrández with a rope

Since 2011, senior individual gymnasts perform four different routines with hoop, ball, clubs and ribbon. This is the case for individual juniors as well since 2020. Senior groups perform two different routines, one with a single apparatus and one with mixed apparatus (for example, a routine with 5 hoops and a routine with 3 balls / 2 ribbons). Junior groups perform two different routines with two different types of apparatus (for example, a routine with 5 hoops and a routine with 5 ribbons).

Rope
The rope is made from hemp or a similar synthetic material; it can be knotted and have anti-slip material at the ends, but it does not have handles. Rope elements include skipping over the apparatus and wrapping it around the body. In 2011, the FIG decided to eliminate the use of rope in senior individual rhythmic gymnastics competitions. It is still sometimes seen in junior group competition.

Hoop
The hoop comes up to about the gymnast's hip. It may be made of plastic or wood, and it may be covered with decorative adhesive tape. Hoop elements include rotation of the hoop around the hand or body, rolling the hoop on the body or floor, and the gymnast passing through the hoop.

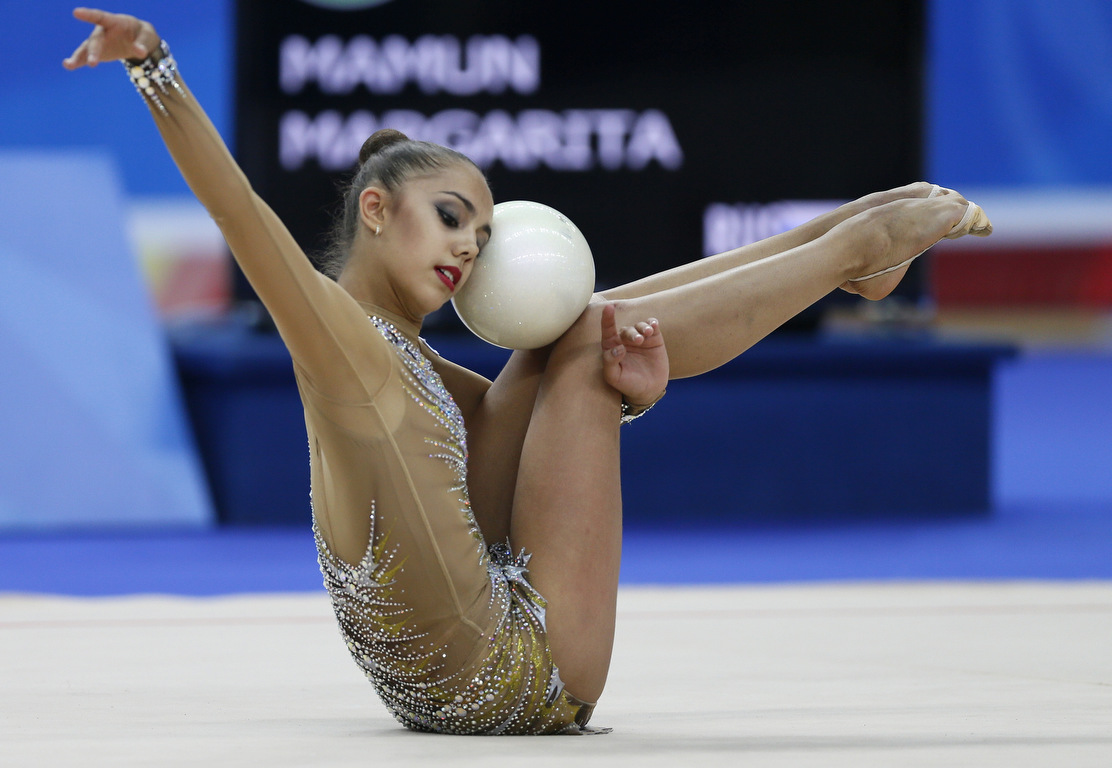
Margarita Mamun with a ball

Ball
The ball may be made of rubber or a similar synthetic material, and it can be of any color. It should rest in the gymnast's hand and not be pressed against the wrist or grasped with the fingers, which incurs a penalty. Ball elements include bouncing or rolling the ball.

Clubs
The clubs may be made of wood or synthetic materials, and they may be covered with decorative adhesive tape. They may be connected together by inserting the end of one club into the head of the other. Clubs elements including swinging the heads of the clubs in circles, small throws in which the clubs rotate in the air, and asymmetrical movements.

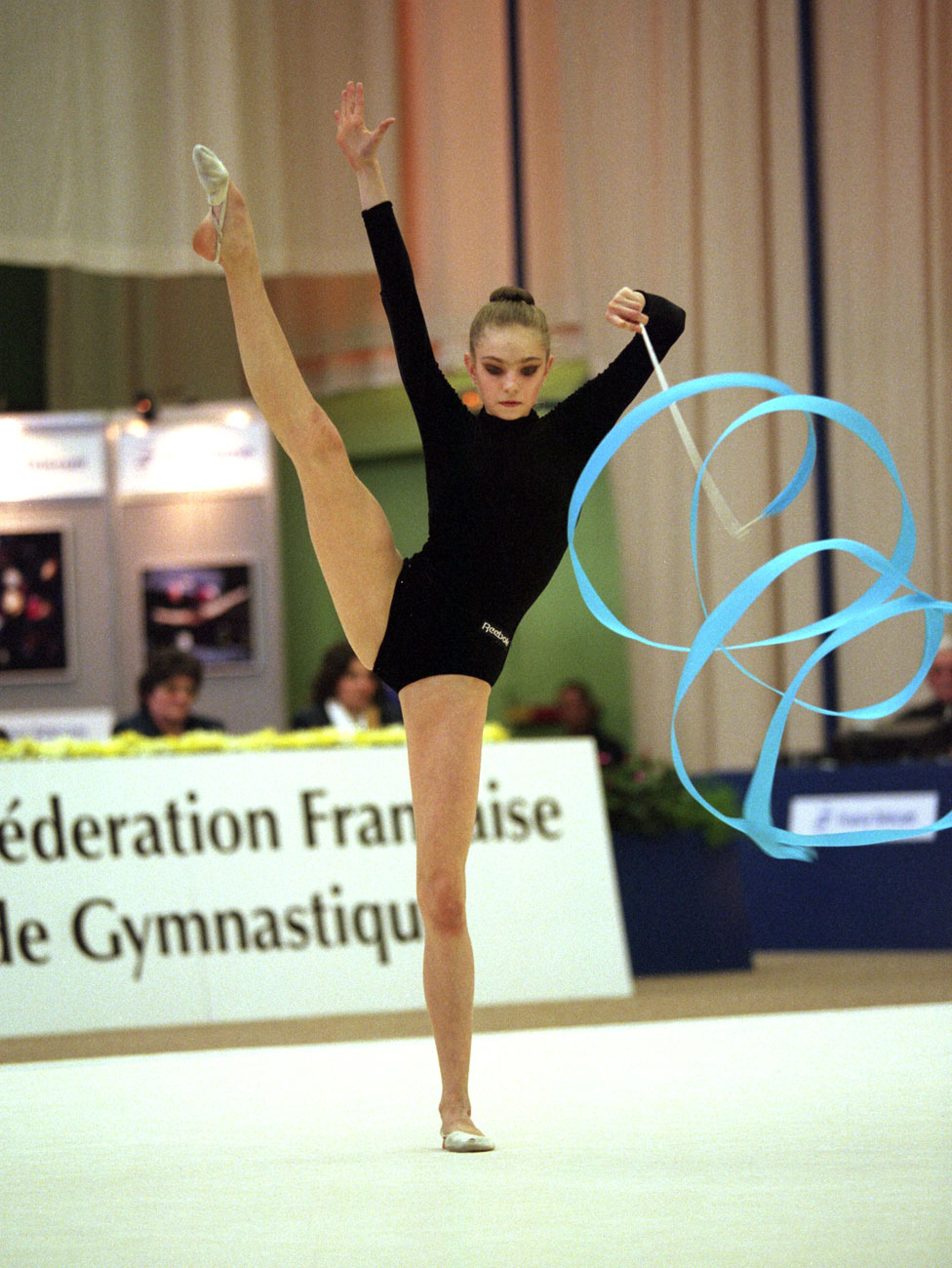
Viktoria Stadnik with a ribbon

Ribbon
The ribbon consists of a handle, which may be made of wood, bamboo, or synthetic materials such as fiberglass, and the ribbon itself, which is made of satin. The ribbon is six meters long, and due to its length, it can easily become tangled or knotted. Knots must be undone or the gymnast will be penalized. Ribbon elements consist of making continuous shapes with the length of the fabric, such as tight circles (spirals) or waves (snakes), and elements called boomerangs, in which the gymnast tosses the handle, then pulls it back by the end of the ribbon and catches it.

== Elements ==
Elements in rhythmic gymnastics have assigned difficulty values that contribute to the overall difficulty score. They are generally divided into two types: body and apparatus difficulties. New difficulties may be submitted to the technical committee by coaches.

=== Body difficulties ===
Body difficulties are elements performed using the body, with each one having a defined shape. The apparatus must continue to be used during a body difficulty, and gymnasts must perform at least one of each type and generally should not repeat the exact same element during one exercise. The types of body difficulties are:

- Jumps/Leaps: Jumps must be high enough to show a well-defined shape in the air. The same leap may be repeated in a series.
- Balances: A balance must be held for at least one second. They can be performed alone or in a dynamic balance, in which the gymnast performs at least three balances in combination on the same foot with a turn between each balance.
- Rotations: Rotations are turns generally performed either on a flat foot or on relevé, but they can be performed on other parts of the body.
- For groups: Exchanges, which are an element where all five gymnasts perform a high, long throw of their apparatus to another gymnast and then catch an apparatus thrown by another gymnast. This can be done simultaneously by the whole group, or one sub-group may perform an exchange before the rest of the gymnasts do so.

In addition, gymnasts may perform full body waves, which are a wave of movement through the whole body from the head through the feet or vice versa. Individuals may perform up to four dynamic elements with rotation, which are commonly known as risks. During a risk, the gymnast throws the apparatus high into the air and rotates at least twice underneath it, using either a series of turning leaps or a combination of rolls, turns on the feet, or pre-acrobatic elements such as cartwheels or walkovers, before catching the apparatus. Groups may elect to perform a single risk.

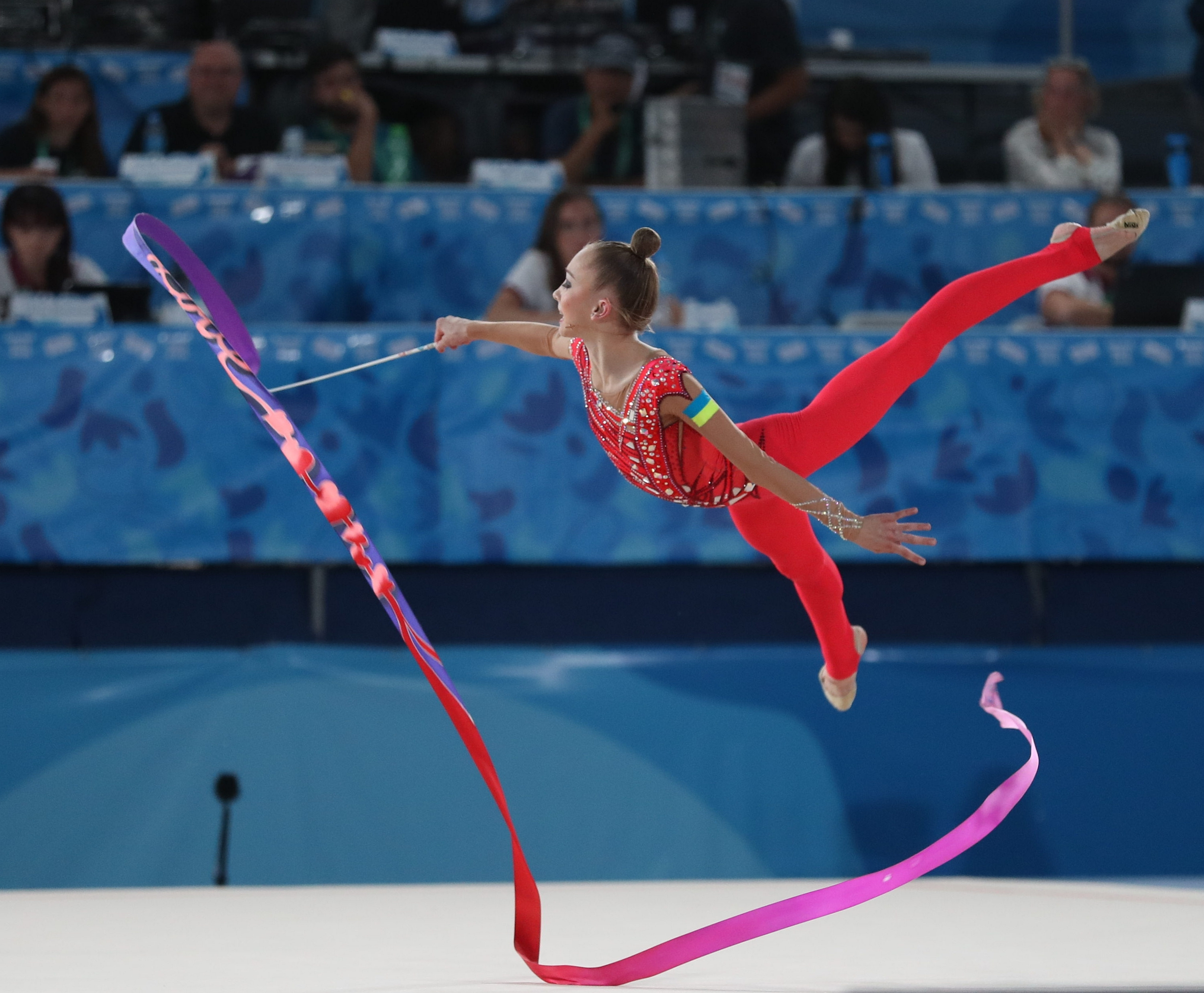
Butterfly jump (Khrystyna Pohranychna)

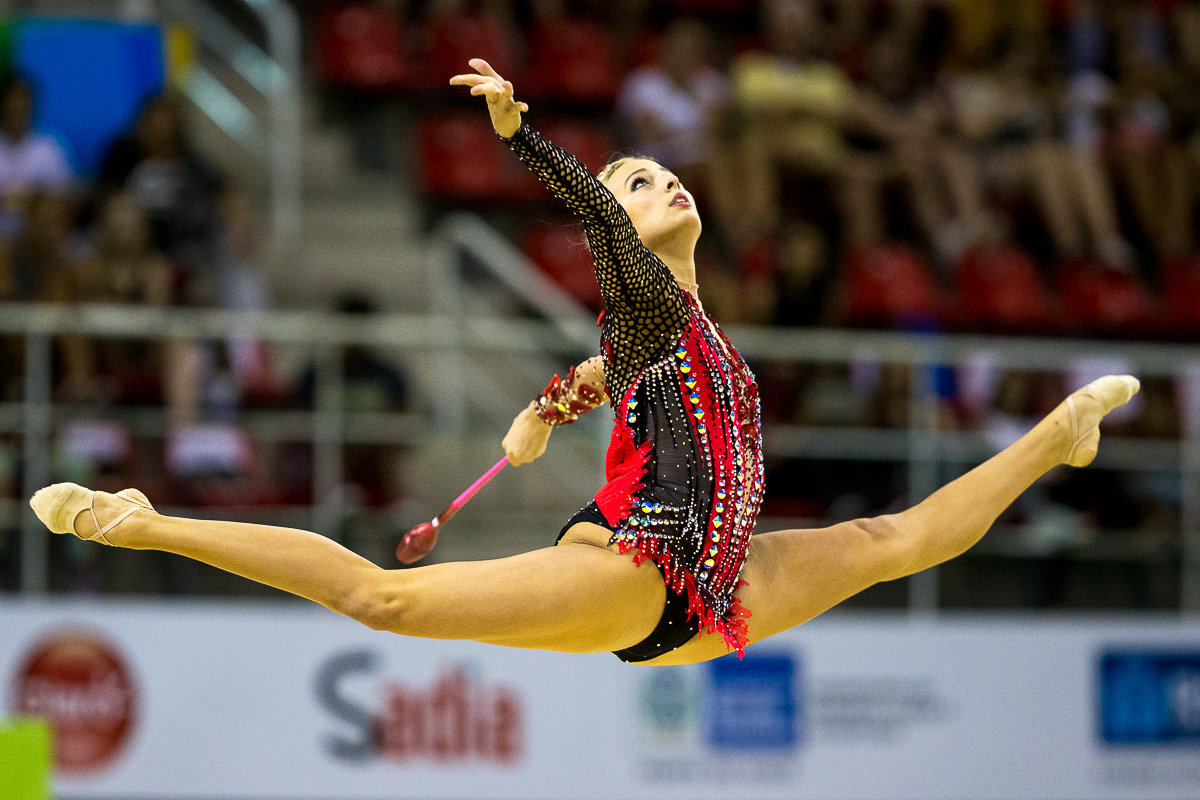
Split leap (Nicol Ruprecht)

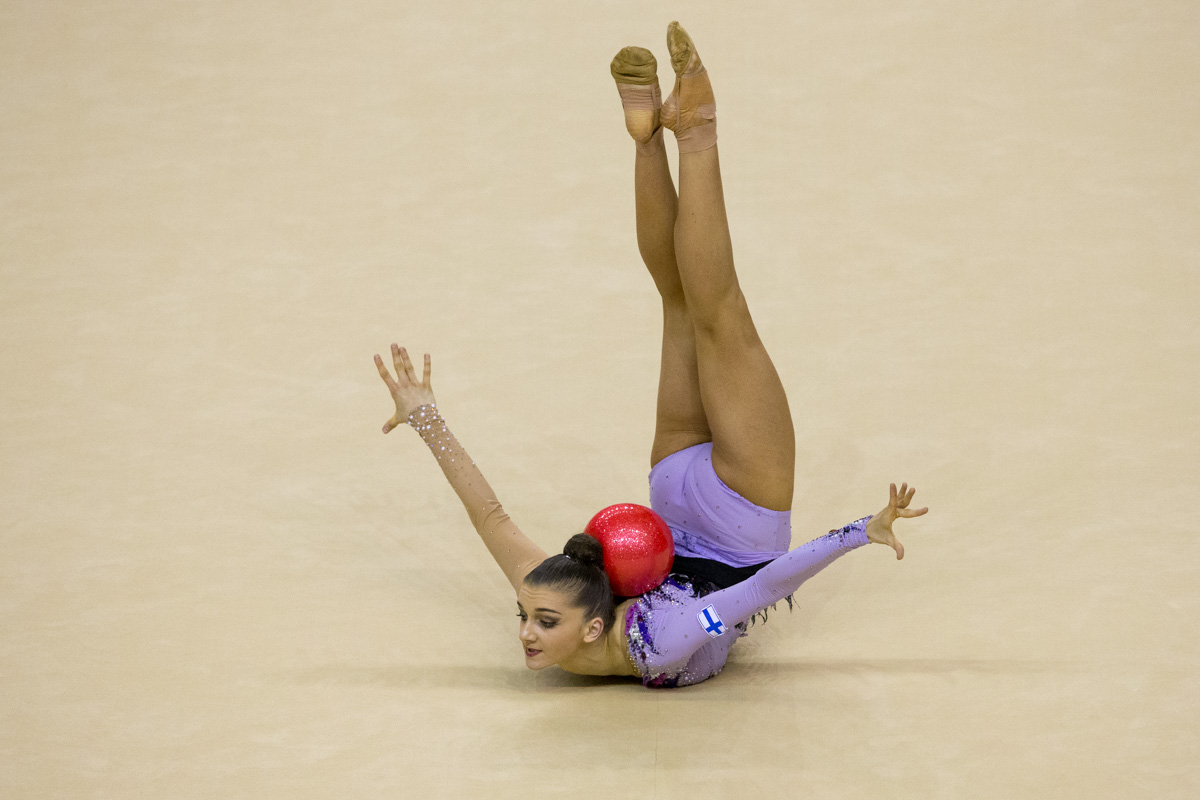
Chest balance (Ekaterina Volkova)

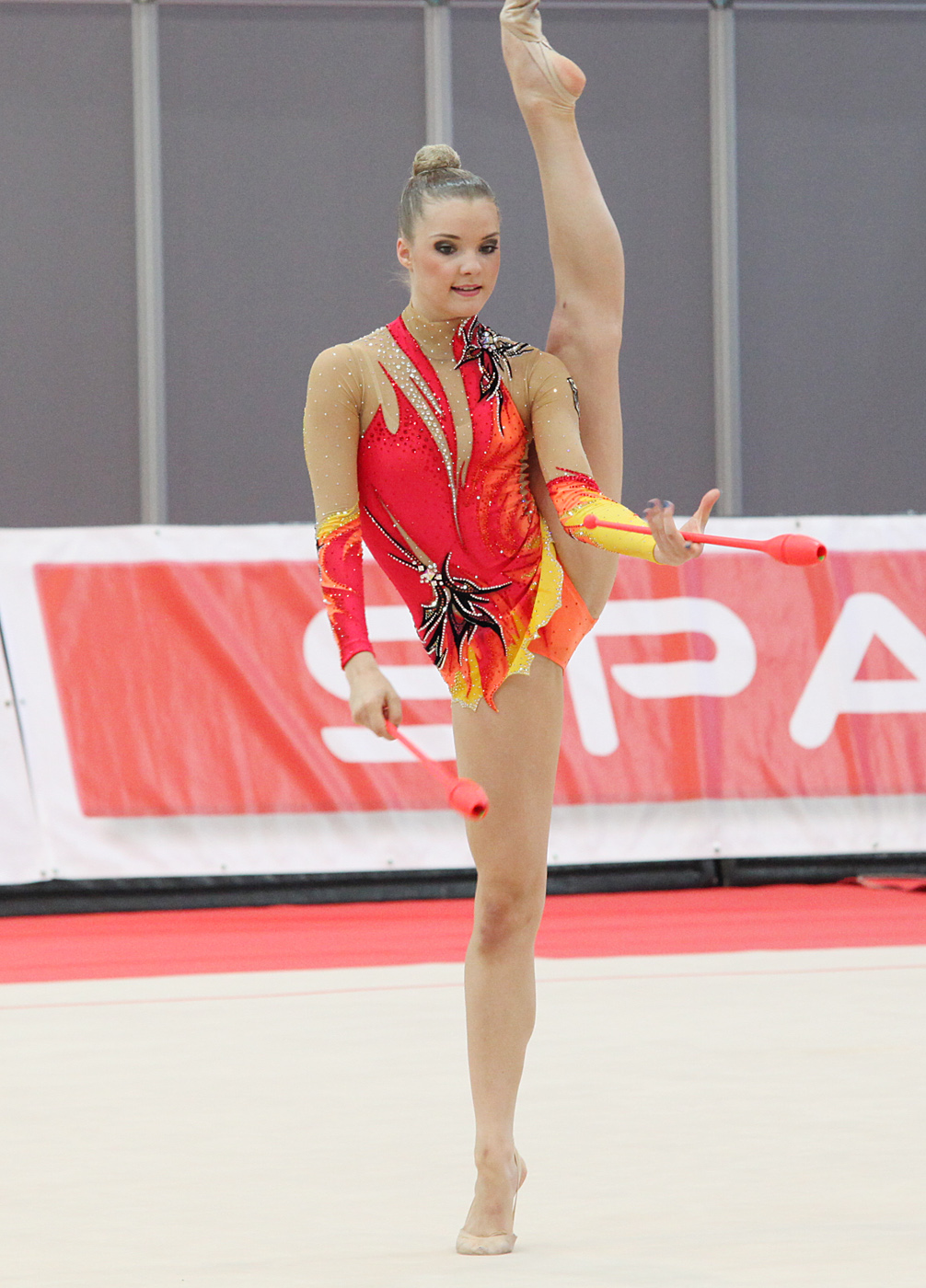
Side split balance (Laura Jung)

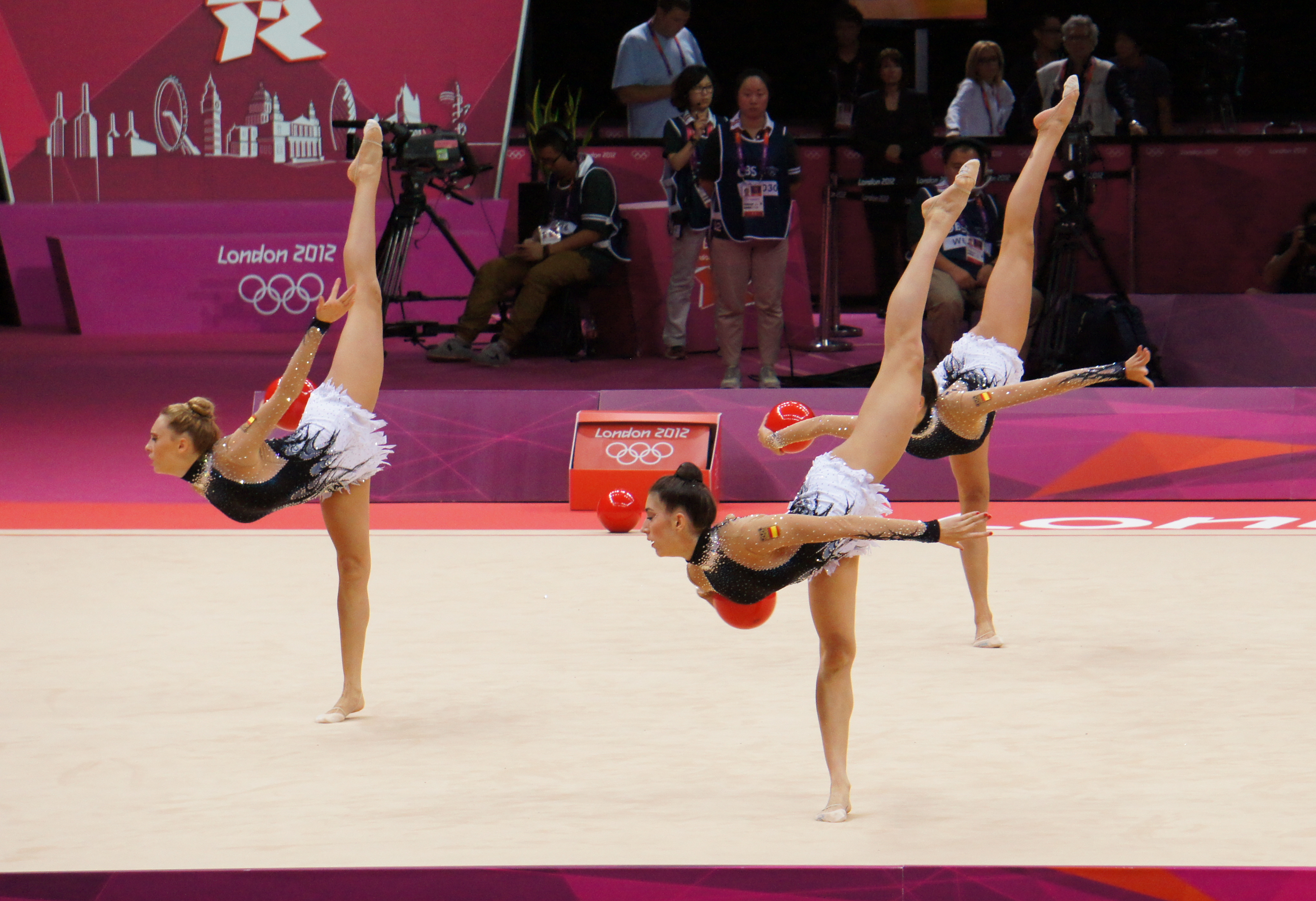
Rotation in penché position (Spanish group)

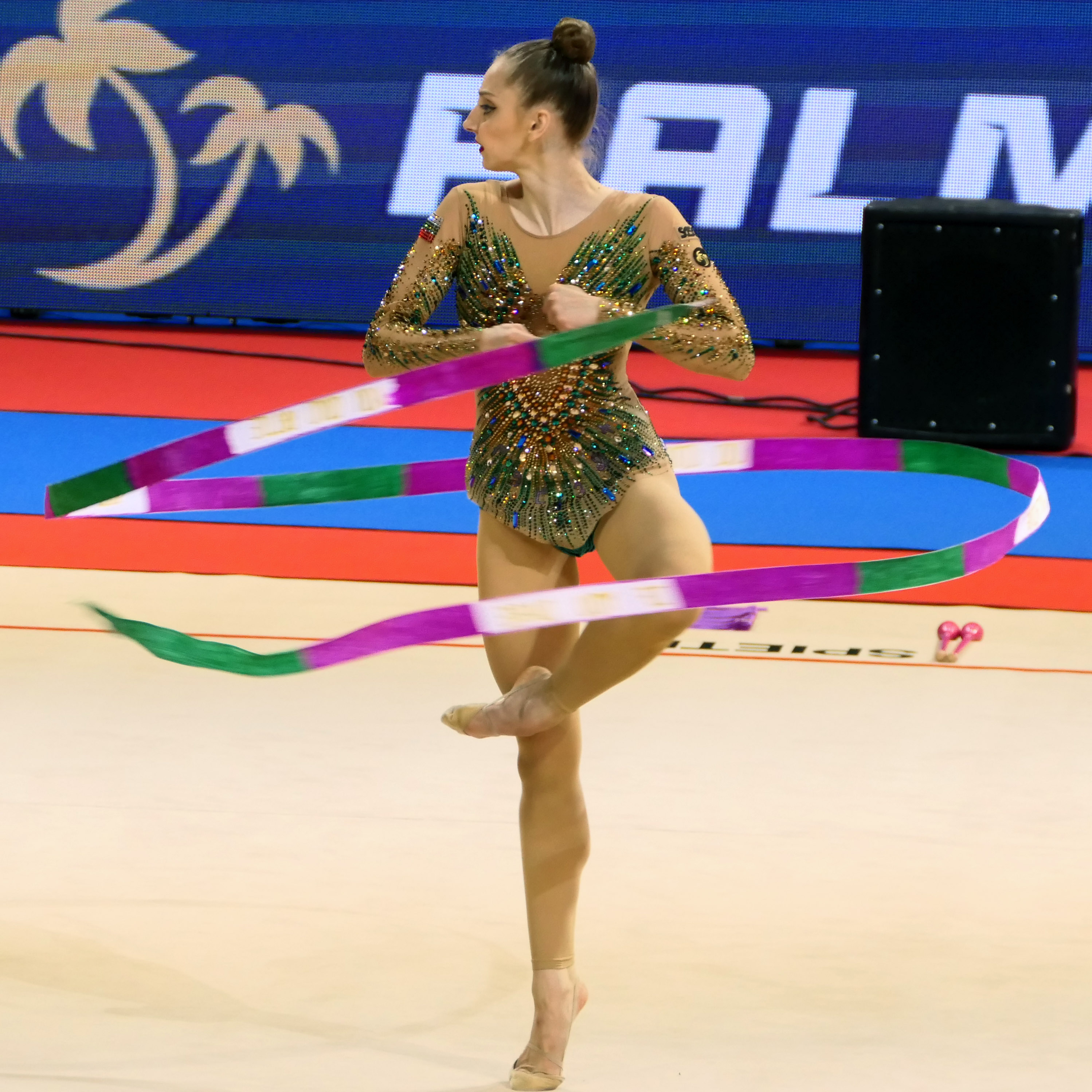
Rotation done as fouetté turns (Boryana Kaleyn)

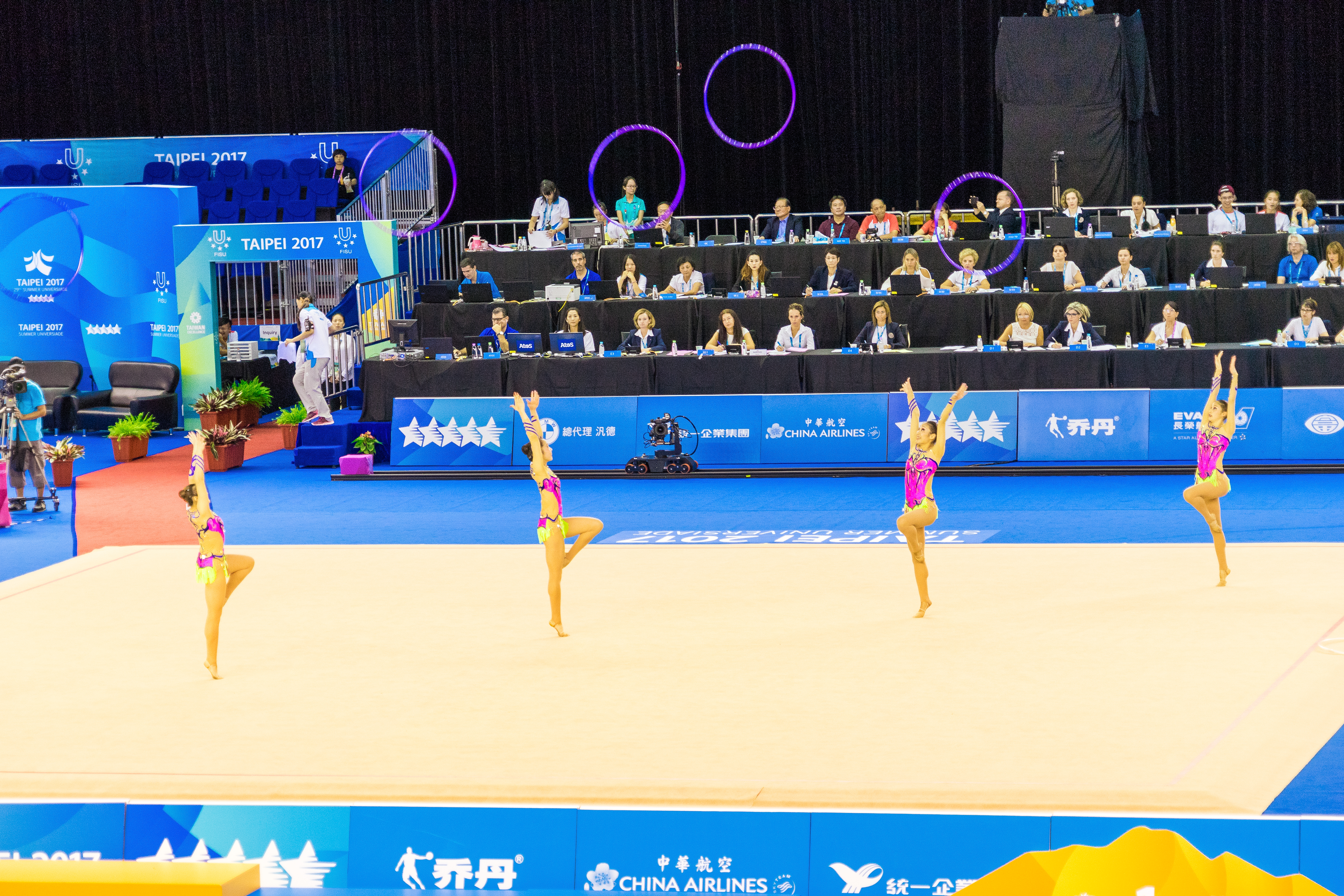
Simultaneous exchange (Japanese group)

A risk performed with several rolls (Stiliana Nikolova)

=== Apparatus difficulties ===
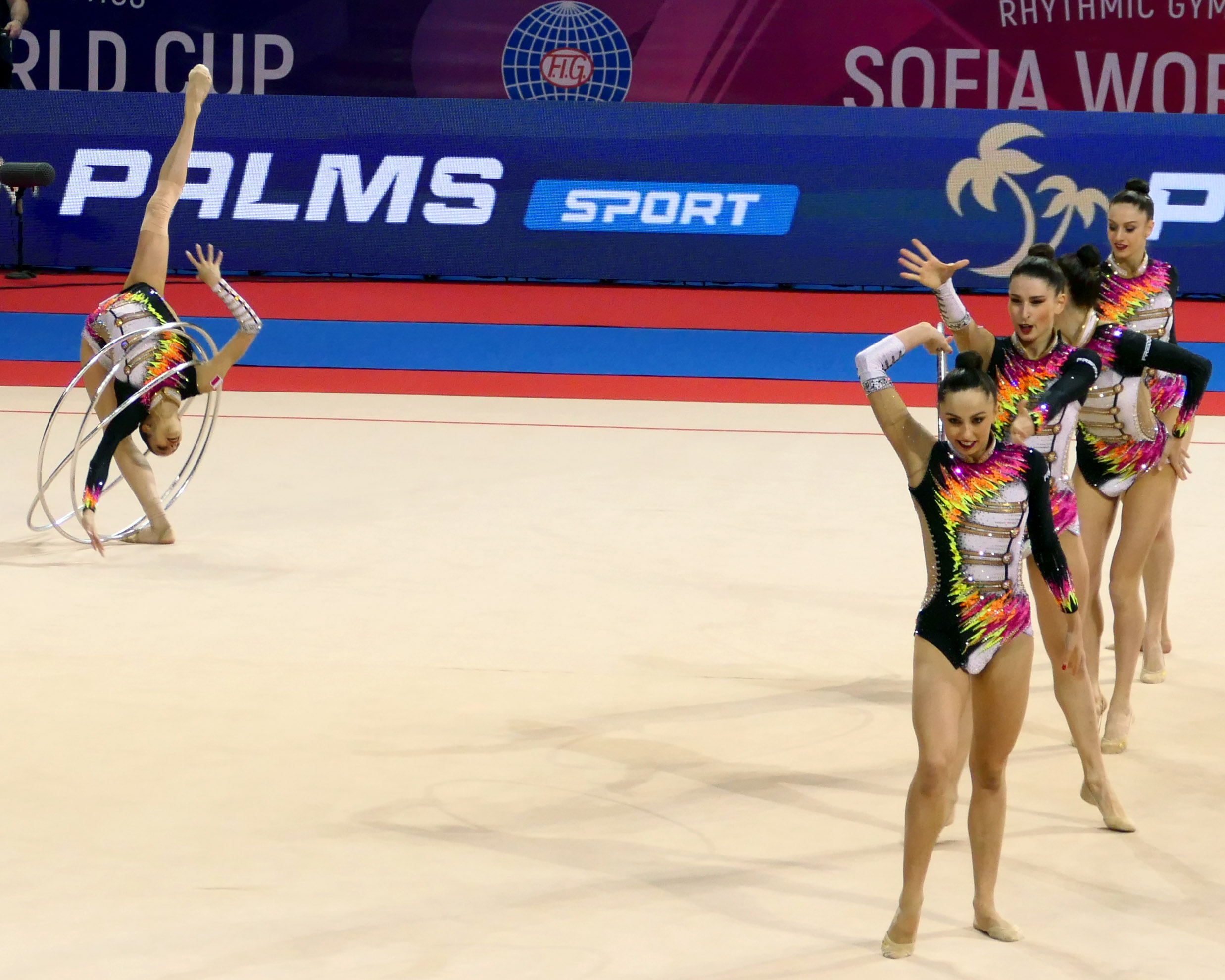
A collaboration by the Italian group

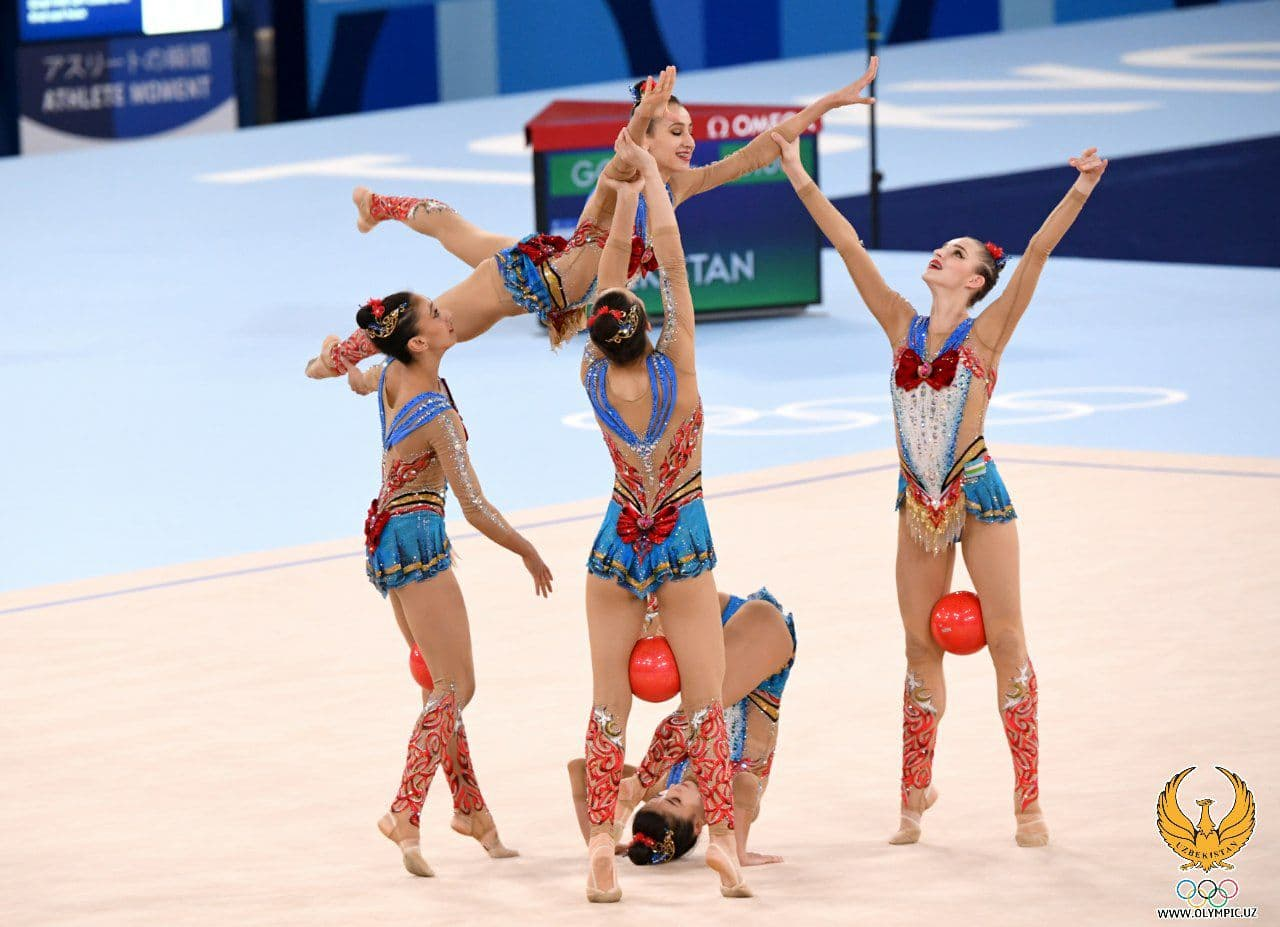
A collaboration with a lift by the Uzbekistani group

Apparatus difficulties are elements performed with the apparatus. Each apparatus difficulty has either one base element and two or more criteria executed during that base, or the base element of a catch from a high throw combined with a second base element and one or more criteria executed during both bases. A base is a basic movement or usage of the apparatus, such as a large roll of the hoop, and a criterion is a way of performing a movement which makes it more difficult, such as performing it outside of the visual field or without using the hands. The base elements differ somewhat by apparatus, with some bases (such as a high throw) being valid for all apparatuses and others being particular to one apparatus (such as creating a spiral pattern with the ribbon fabric).

For groups, apparatus difficulties include collaborations between all five gymnasts, in which each gymnast works with one or more apparatuses and one or more partners. These can include multiple apparatuses being thrown at once or gymnasts lifting another gymnast.

=== Dance steps ===
Another required element is the dance steps combination, which must last for at least eight seconds, have a defined character that matches the music, and be performed without high throws of the apparatus, any apparatus difficulties, or pre-acrobatic elements. Two sets of dance steps are required for each exercise. Unlike the body and apparatus difficulties, they are evaluated as part of the artistry score rather than the difficulty score.

== Scoring system and competition format ==
In rhythmic gymnastics, competitive exercises are evaluated by the scoring system defined in the FIG Code of Points. After each Olympic season, the code is modified.

=== Competition format ===
Generally, rhythmic gymnastic meets are generally divided into qualifying rounds and event finals. At some competitions, there is also an all-around final for individuals. The Olympics has qualifying rounds and all-around finals for both individuals and groups, but there are no event finals.

In the qualifying round, individual gymnasts compete up to four routines, one for each apparatus; at some competitions, gymnasts may compete only three routines and still qualify for the individual all-around final. Group gymnasts compete two routines, one in which there are five of the same apparatus (such as five balls) and one in which there are two of one apparatus and three of another (such as two hoops and three ribbons). These apparatuses are determined by the FIG for each season. In the all-around, individual gymnasts alternate between competing hoop and ball and then clubs and ribbon, while the groups all perform either their single-apparatus or mixed-apparatus routines during the same competition group.

The qualifying round determines who advances to the event final for each apparatus for individuals and for either apparatus combination for groups. There is a maximum of two qualifiers per country for each individual event final. For groups, their total score in the qualifying round determines their all-around placement. This is the case for individuals at some competitions, while at others, there is a separate all-around final round where the top qualifying gymnasts (maximum two per country) compete four routines. The all-around score is the sum of the scores of all routines performed in that round of competition.

At some competitions, there is a team ranking for federations with at least two individuals and a group entered. The team score is the sum of the eight qualifying round scores (two per apparatus) earned by the individual gymnasts and the qualifying round all-around score earned by the group.

=== Code of Points ===
In the current Code of Points (2025–2028), the final score of a routine is the sum of the difficulty, execution, and artistry scores, minus any additional penalties incurred. The difficulty score is open-ended with no maximum, while the execution and artistry scores have a starting value of 10 points and are lowered for specific mistakes made by the gymnasts.

==== Difficulty ====
The difficulty score is the sum of the value of the difficulty assigned to each element in the gymnast's routine. The score is evaluated during the routine without a predetermined difficulty sheet, unlike with some earlier Codes. It is made up of two component scores: one for body difficulties and one for apparatus difficulties.

==== Execution ====
Execution is the degree to which the gymnast performs an element with aesthetic and technical perfection. Execution penalties are subtracted from the starting score of 10 and range in size from 0.10 points for a small fault, such as poor amplitude in a body wave or a small deviation from the desired shape of a leap, to 1.00 points, such as for dropping or losing the apparatus outside the floor area. Execution deductions include poor body form during an element, poor technique using an apparatus like squeezing the ball, loss of balance, not holding a balance element for long enough, hopping during a rotation element, needing to take steps to catch a thrown apparatus, or losing or dropping the apparatus.

==== Artistry ====
Artistry evaluates the artistic performance of the gymnast and the composition of the exercise with the music. As with execution, penalties are defined by the code and subtracted from the starting score of 10. The ideal is for the gymnast to perform with continuous character using a variety of movements that reflect changes in the music and are connected smoothly together. Deductions range from 0.30 to 1.00 for penalties that are taken once, which include deductions for a lack of dynamic change or use of effect in the exercise, a lack of facial expression, not ending in time with the music, missing a complete dance step combination, or not using the entire floor area. Deductions for poor connections between elements and poor connection to the music (such as a musical accent not being emphasized by the gymnast's movements) are 0.10 points each and can be taken up to 20 times in one exercise.

==== Penalties ====
Finally, penalties are taken by the time, line, and responsible judges. Possible penalties include:

- The gymnast leaving the floor area
- The apparatus leaving the floor area
- The exercise being longer or shorter than the acceptable length of time (1'15" to 1'30" is the required length for individual routines, and 2'15" to 2'30" is the required length for group routines)
- Dress of the gymnast not conforming to the regulations
- Communication with the coach during the execution of the exercise
- Verbal communication between group gymnasts during the exercise
- Grabbing a new apparatus from the side of the floor if the first apparatus is still on the floor area.

=== Evolution of the Code of Points ===
Rhythmic gymnastics has been through a number of different Codes of Points, beginning with the publication of the first in 1970. The first two codes were valid from 1970 to 1971 and 1971–1972; beginning with the 1973–1976 code, the Code of Points is adjusted after each Olympics, although smaller changes are made during each Olympic cycle. As with artistic gymnastics, scores originally had a maximum of 10.

The first few years of rhythmic gymnastics competition did not yet have a code of points. A commission was formed to write the rules of the new sport in 1968, and they released the first code in 1970.

In the 1973–1976 code, for individuals, difficulty accounted for five points of the score. Elements were divided into 'medium' and 'superior' difficulty, and gymnasts were required to include two superior difficulty and six medium difficulty elements, at least three of which had to be performed with the left hand. For example, a body wave on two feet or a single split leap was of medium difficulty, while a body wave on one foot or a series of two leaps in a row was of superior difficulty. The remaining five points were made up of originality, relation to the music, execution, and general impression. For groups, scores were out of a maximum of 20, with five points each given for the composition, technical value, execution, and general harmony.

In the 1980s, new difficulty elements were introduced to give greater prominence to flexibility and risk releases, and to encourage originality. In the early 1980s, the scoring remained similar, though technical value of the routine was added as part of the marking for the individual score. In 1985, the score was composed of composition (technical + artistry) and execution, each of which was scored out of 5 points.

Risk elements were introduced in the 1989–1992 code, and the required difficulties were changed to four superior and four medium. With increased difficulty requirements and new bonuses for originality, the new code was meant to address criticisms of score inflation. This criticism came after the all-around competition at the 1988 European Championships ended in a three-way tie for first place, all three gymnasts having been given perfect scores of 10.0 for all their routines, and Marina Lobatch won the 1988 Summer Olympics with all eight of her routines being given scores of 10.0. The 1993–1996 code increased the required number of body difficulties to 12 and divided them into four categories of difficulty rather than two.

In 1997, the Code of Points was significantly changed, with a focus on differentiating routines for each apparatus and encouraging variety and musicality; bonus points could be awarded for an exercise that was closely matched in character and rhythm to the musical accompaniment. Difficulty was divided into artistry (out of 5 points for individual or 6 points for groups), technical (out of 5 points for individuals or 4 points for groups) to simplify judging. The allowed body difficulties increased to twelve, and the number of flexibility-related difficulties in the code more than doubled from 11 to 24.

The 2001–2004 code focused on extreme flexibility at the expense of apparatus handling and artistry. Scores had a maximum of thirty points, divided into three categories with a maximum of ten points each: execution, artistic, and difficulty. In 2005–2008 code, the number of body difficulties increased again to 18, and they were more finely graded in difficulty rating. The score still included the same three categories, but it was now out of 20 points, as artistry and difficulty were averaged and then added to execution.

In 2009, the code changed significantly due to the perception that artistry had been lost with the focus on difficulty. As under the 2001–2004 code, the final mark was obtained by adding difficulty (body difficulties, again reduced to twelve, masteries performed with the apparatus, and risk elements), artistry and execution; each had a maximum value of 10 points, so the final score would be a maximum of 30 points. The artistry score was given its own evaluation form and guidelines with specific deductions.

In 2013, the code dropped the artistic score again, and artistry was instead evaluated as part of execution. The maximum number of body difficulties was reduced once more to nine, and the dance steps combination was introduced as its own element. The 2017 code was very similar, with difficulty strictly limited and differences among the best gymnasts heavily determined by the execution. Therefore, in 2018, the difficulty score became open-ended for the first time.

In the 2022–2024 code, the artistry score was once again re-introduced. The 2025–2028 code reduced the maximum number of difficulties counted in the exercise to give more room for artistic expression and transitions between elements. Some body difficulties were removed and others merged to encourage variety and discourage injuries.

=== Judging issues ===
Judging rhythmic gymnastics in real time is a difficult task. In addition, judges may be affected by fatigue at long competitions or by high temperatures in competition rounds where ribbon routines are being performed; air conditioning is typically turned off during those rounds because it can cause drafts that interfere with the ribbon's movement. At the 2023 World Championships, held in Valencia, Spain, the arena reached 35 °C (95 °F).

Group judging is especially difficult, as five gymnasts and five apparatuses are in constant, complex motion over a large area. A 2015 study comparing novice, national-level, and international-level judges when judging two group routines found that although the international-level judges performed the best at correctly identifying errors, they only recorded about 40% of errors when they evaluated a routine using normal judging procedures. They made more mistakes when judging the mixed apparatus routine compared to the single-apparatus routine.

As in other judged sports, national bias is sometimes an issue. A study performed in 2023 using the FIG's judging evaluation statistics found that there was significant national bias in aerobic, artistic, and rhythmic gymnastics judging. The FIG uses the judging evaluation statistics to provide feedback to judges and guide judging assignments and changes in judging procedures. Judges can be sanctioned if they are found to be giving biased scores; for example, after the scoring at the 2015 World Championships was reviewed, one judge was suspended and another was given a warning, both for national bias.

== Attire and music ==
=== Attire ===
Gymnasts wear leotards to compete, which may be decorated to match the routine as long as they do not have excessive amounts of flesh-colored fabric; group gymnasts must wear identical leotards. Modern leotards are typically highly decorated and may contain hand-painted details and large numbers of crystals, which can make them very expensive, and gymnasts at high levels typically wear different leotards to compete with different apparatuses. According to the chief designer of Sasaki Sports, custom leotard orders can take 3 to 5 months to complete. Gymnasts may choose to wear long tights under their leotard, wear a leotard with long legs (a unitard) as long as the legs are the same length and color, or wear a short skirt (no longer than the pelvis) over or attached to their leotard or unitard. They may not wear other accessories such as gloves that are not attached to the leotard, except for optionally wearing rhythmic toe shoes.

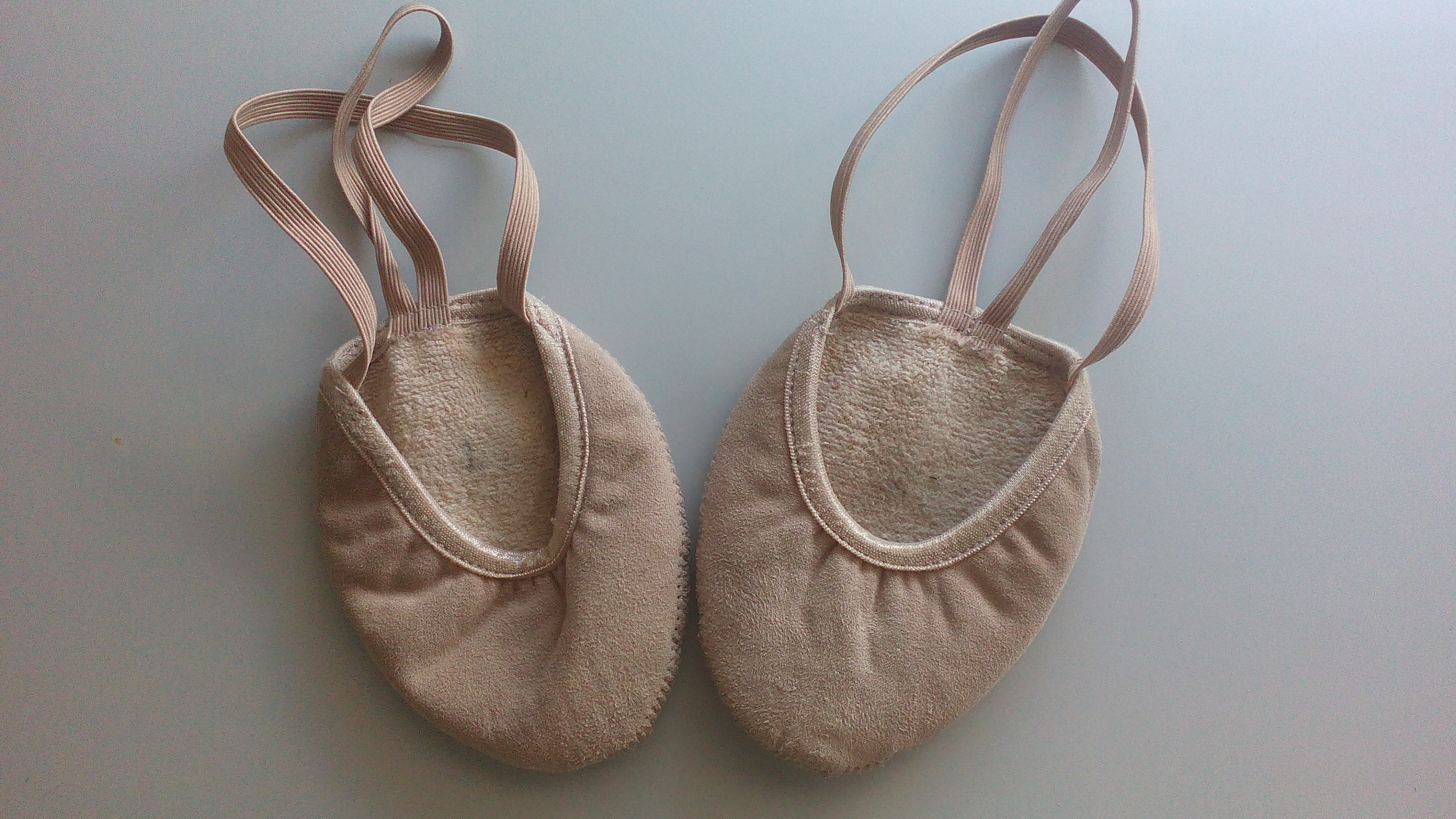
Rhythmic gymnastic toe shoes

Rhythmic gymnasts wear special slippers that cover their toes but not heels to reduce friction for rotations. Depending on the surface a gymnast is practicing on, they may be worn through in a week or two.

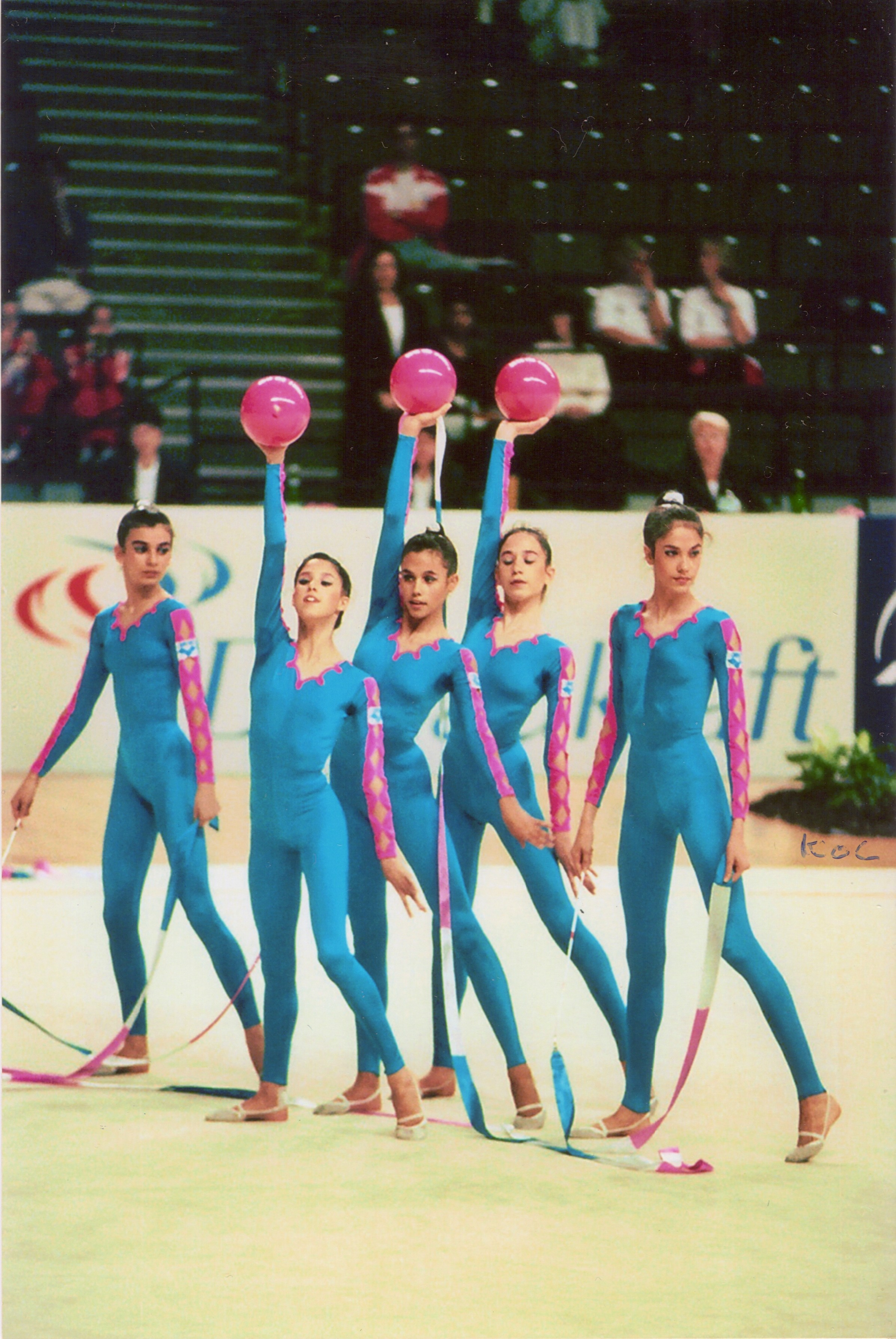
Gymnasts in unitards (Spanish group in 1995)

Leotards were originally simple, with decorations such as flowers or sequins not allowed. The 1989–1992 code specified that geometric and flower designs were allowed, but designs such as those that mimicked other clothing like vests or things like animals were not. Tights could be worn starting in 1993. Unitards were introduced as an option. Beginning in 1997, requirements loosened, and gymnasts were allowed to decorate their leotards with sequins and metallic colors. Unitards were popular through the late 90s but became less common afterward.

Skirted leotards were introduced in the 2001–2004 code of points. Former gymnast Michelle Smith suggested that they might help older athletes feel more confident at a time when it was becoming more common for gymnasts to continue competing into their 20s.

=== Music ===
Gymnasts may use music from any style, and the routine should be choreographed to the specific music chosen. The code of points says that music should be selected with respect to personal qualities of the gymnast, such as age. A penalty may be applied for musical choices that violate the ethical norms of rhythmic gymnastics, and sounds not typically used in music, such as sirens, are forbidden. Individual routines range from one minute and fifteen seconds to one minute and thirty seconds, while group routines may be from two minutes and fifteen seconds to two minutes and thirty seconds.

Gymnasts originally performed to music using a single instrument, which could be either live accompaniment (typically a piano) or taped music. Under the 1989–1992 code, groups were allowed to use music played on multiple instruments. This change came into effect for individual routines as well at the end of 1989. The 1993–1996 code emphasized that gymnasts should interpret and move with the music and that it should not be background noise to the routine. Beginning in 2013, gymnasts could use music with lyrics, but only for one routine. Under the 2017–2021 code of points, individuals could use lyrics with music for two routines. The restriction on music with lyrics was dropped from the 2022–2024 code of points.

== Major competitions ==
According to the technical regulations defined by the International Gymnastics Federation, the only official competitions in which rhythmic gymnastics events are contested globally are: the World Championships, the Junior World Championships, the stages of the World Cup series and World Challenge Cup series, and the Olympic Games (as well as the Youth Olympic Games). Test events for the Olympic Games were held in 2000, 2004, 2008, 2012, and 2016.

The nations which have earned at least one medal in official FIG competitions are:

- Argentina
- Austria
- Azerbaijan
- Belarus
- Brazil
- Bulgaria
- Canada
- China
- Cyprus
- Czechoslovakia
- East Germany
- Egypt
- Estonia
- Finland
- France
- Georgia
- Germany
- Greece
- Hungary
- Israel
- Italy
- Japan
- Kazakhstan
- Kyrgyzstan
- Latvia
- Mexico
- North Korea
- Poland
- Romania
- Russia
- Slovenia
- South Korea
- Soviet Union
- Spain
- Switzerland
- Ukraine
- United States
- Uzbekistan
- West Germany

Major rhythmic gymnastics tournaments recognized but not organized by FIG include the continental championships (the European Championships and its junior division, the Pan American Championships, the Asian Championships, the African Championships, and the Oceania Championships) and multi-sport events in which rhythmic gymnastics is part of the program, such as the European Games, the Pan American Games, the Asian Games, and the Summer World University Games.

Defunct competitions organized by the FIG include the Four Continents Gymnastics Championships, which was attended by gymnasts outside of Europe and meant to encourage worldwide development of the sport, and the FIG World Cup or World Cup Final. While rhythmic gymnastics is not currently part of the World Games program, apparatus finals were competed there from 2001 to 2022.

== Dominant teams and nations ==
Rhythmic gymnastics has been dominated by Eastern European countries, especially the Soviet Union (Post-Soviet Republics of today) and Bulgaria. The two countries were in rivalry with each other from the third World Championships, where the ballet foundations of the Soviet athletes were contrasted against the risky throws and catches of the Bulgarian competitors, until the dissolution of the Soviet Union. After the breakup of the Soviet Union, Russia became the dominant country of rhythmic gymnastics.

=== Soviet Union ===
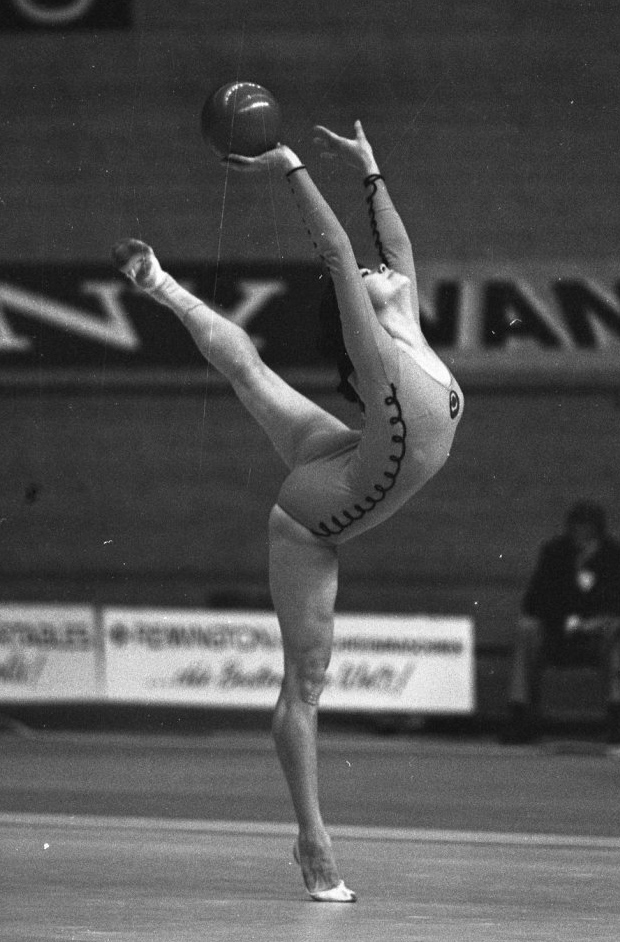
Galima Shugurova

Before the breakup of the Soviet Union in 1991, Soviet rhythmic gymnasts were engaged in a fierce competition with Bulgaria. The first World Championships held in 1963 in Budapest, Hungary was won by Soviet gymnast Ludmila Savinkova, and in 1967 in Copenhagen, Denmark, the first group championship was won by the USSR.

Other Soviet World all-around champions in individuals included Elena Karpuchina, Galima Shugurova and Irina Deriugina. Marina Lobatch became the first Soviet to win the Olympic Games in the 1988 Seoul Olympics. In 1991, The Unified Team was formed and two Soviet/Ukrainian gymnasts competed at the 1992 Summer Olympics in Barcelona; Olexandra Tymoshenko won gold and Oxana Skaldina won bronze.

=== Bulgaria ===
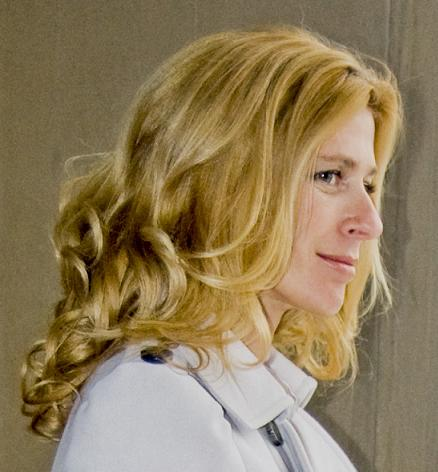
Bianka Panova

The Bulgarian Rhythmic Gymnastics Federation was established in 1963, and in the early days of the sport, most elite gymnasts spent time training in Bulgaria.

Since the inception of rhythmic gymnastics as a World Championship event, Bulgaria was in competition with the Soviet Union; during the late 1960s and throughout the 1970s, Bulgaria won 10 individual World titles with its star gymnasts Maria Gigova (three-time World all-around champion), Neshka Robeva and Kristina Guiourova.

The 1980s marked the height of Bulgarian success with a generation of gymnasts known as the Golden Girls of Bulgaria, with gymnasts Iliana Raeva, Anelia Ralenkova, Lilia Ignatova, Diliana Gueorguieva, Bianka Panova, Adriana Dunavska (the silver medalist at the 1988 Summer Olympics) and Elizabeth Koleva dominating the World Championships. Bianka Panova became the first rhythmic gymnast to make a clean sweep of all five individual events at a World Championship. She became the first rhythmic gymnast to get into the Guinness Book of World Records by earning full marks in all her routines (total of 8) at a World Championship, and she received the trophy personally from the President of the International Olympic Committee at the time, Juan Antonio Samaranch.

Bulgarian gymnasts continued to have success into the 1990s, with Mila Marinova winning five medals at the 1991 World Championships and the rise of Maria Petrova, who dominated competition in the mid-1990s to become a three-time World all-around champion and three-time European all-around champion. More recent individuals include 2024 European champion Stiliana Nikolova, as well as Boryana Kaleyn, the 2023 European champion and the silver medalist at the 2024 Summer Olympics.

The Bulgarian group won silver at the first Olympics that included a group event, the 1996 Summer Olympics. They won the bronze medals at the 2004 Summer Olympics and at the 2016 Summer Olympics. At the following 2020 Summer Olympics, the group (comprising Simona Dyankova, Laura Traets, Stefani Kiryakova, Madlen Radukanova, and Erika Zafirova) won its first gold medal.

=== Russia ===
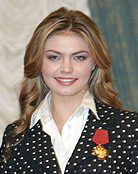
Alina Kabaeva

After the breakup of the Soviet Union, Russia has been the dominant country in rhythmic gymnastics. The start of the late 1990s saw the rise of stars like Amina Zaripova, Yanina Batyrchina and Alina Kabaeva. Oksana Kostina became Russia's first World champion as an independent country.

At the 2000 Summer Olympics in Sydney, Yulia Barsukova became the first Russian to win the Olympic gold medal. Alina Kabaeva, who had won bronze in Sydney, went on to win gold in the 2004 Athens Olympics and was noted for her flexibility. Evgenia Kanaeva became the first individual rhythmic gymnast to win two gold medals in the Olympic Games at the 2008 Beijing Olympics and 2012 London Olympics and won 17 World Championship medals during her career, including three all-around golds. Margarita Mamun continued the streak of individual gold medalists at the 2016 Rio de Janeiro Olympics, while the competition favorite, three-time World champion Yana Kudryavtseva, took silver because of a drop in her clubs routine during the finals.

Twin sisters Dina Averina and Arina Averina are two of the best rhythmic gymnasts in Russia's history. Dina Averina won multiple World Championship titles, dominating the sport since her senior debut. She secured over 20 gold medals and four all-around titles at the World Championships, making her the most decorated gymnasts in the history of the sport; at the 2020 Summer Olympics, she won the silver medal. Arina Averina achieved significant success, consistently earning medals in major international competitions, including the World and European Championships.

The Russian group has won five of the eight group exercises held in the Olympics since it was included in the Olympic Games at the 1996 Summer Olympics by winning every title from 2000 to 2016.

=== Ukraine ===
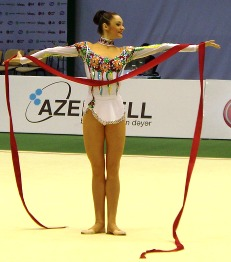
Anna Bessonova

Even as part of the USSR, a number of Soviet gymnasts were trained in Ukraine or were of Ukrainian origin, including the first World champion Ludmila Savinkova as well as Liubov Sereda. Ukraine has won one gold and four bronze medals at the Olympic Games, and Ukrainian gymnasts representing the USSR and Unified Team won an additional gold and two bronze medals. Irina Deriugina won two all-around World titles, but she was even more influential as a coach. The school she and her mother, Albina Deriugina, opened, the Deriugins School, has played an important role in the success of rhythmic gymnastics in the country, training gymnasts like Olympic medalists Olexandra Tymoshenko and Oxana Skaldina.

After the breakup of the Soviet Union, Ukraine continued its success in rhythmic gymnastics, with Kateryna Serebrianska winning the Olympic gold medal at the 1996 Atlanta Olympics and Olena Vitrychenko winning bronze. Hanna Rizatdinova won the bronze medal at the 2016 Summer Olympics.

Anna Bessonova is one of the most decorated rhythmic gymnasts of all time and consistently challenged Russian gymnasts for medals during her career; she won two bronze medals at the Olympics (2004 and 2008) and almost 30 medals at the World Championships. She is also one of few gymnasts to have won gold medals at the World championships as both an individual and group member.

=== Belarus ===
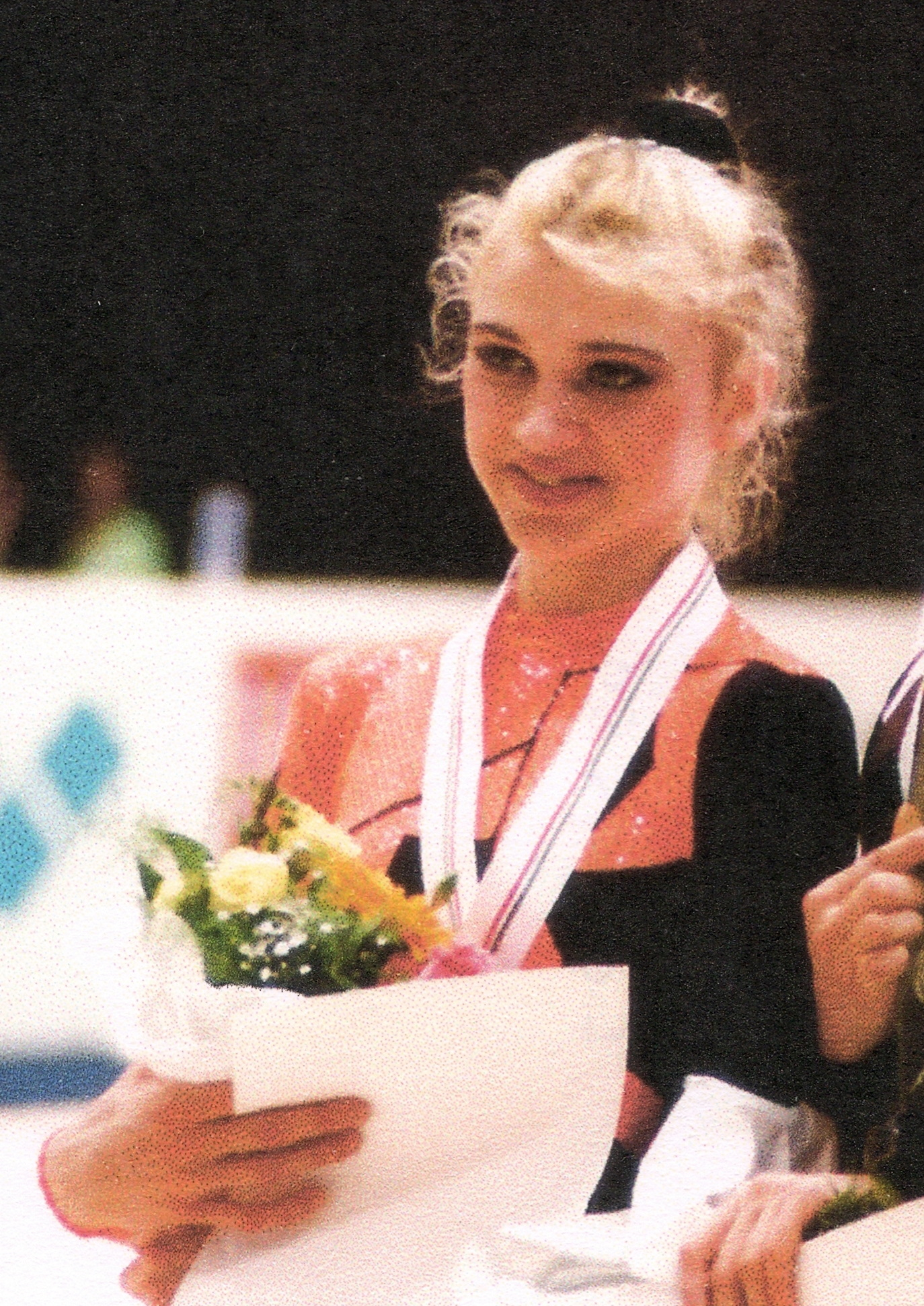
Larisa Lukyanenko

Belarus has had success in both individual and group rhythmic gymnastics after the breakup of the Soviet Union. The first Soviet Olympic gold medalist at the 1988 Seoul Olympics, Marina Lobatch, was a Belarusian; she earned all perfect ten scores during her Olympic performances.

Since the late 1990s, Belarus has had continued success in the Olympic Games and has won two silver and two bronze medals in individuals respectively, with Yulia Raskina, Inna Zhukova, Liubov Charkashyna and Alina Harnasko. The Belarusian group has also won two silver medals and a bronze medal in the Olympics.

=== Spain ===
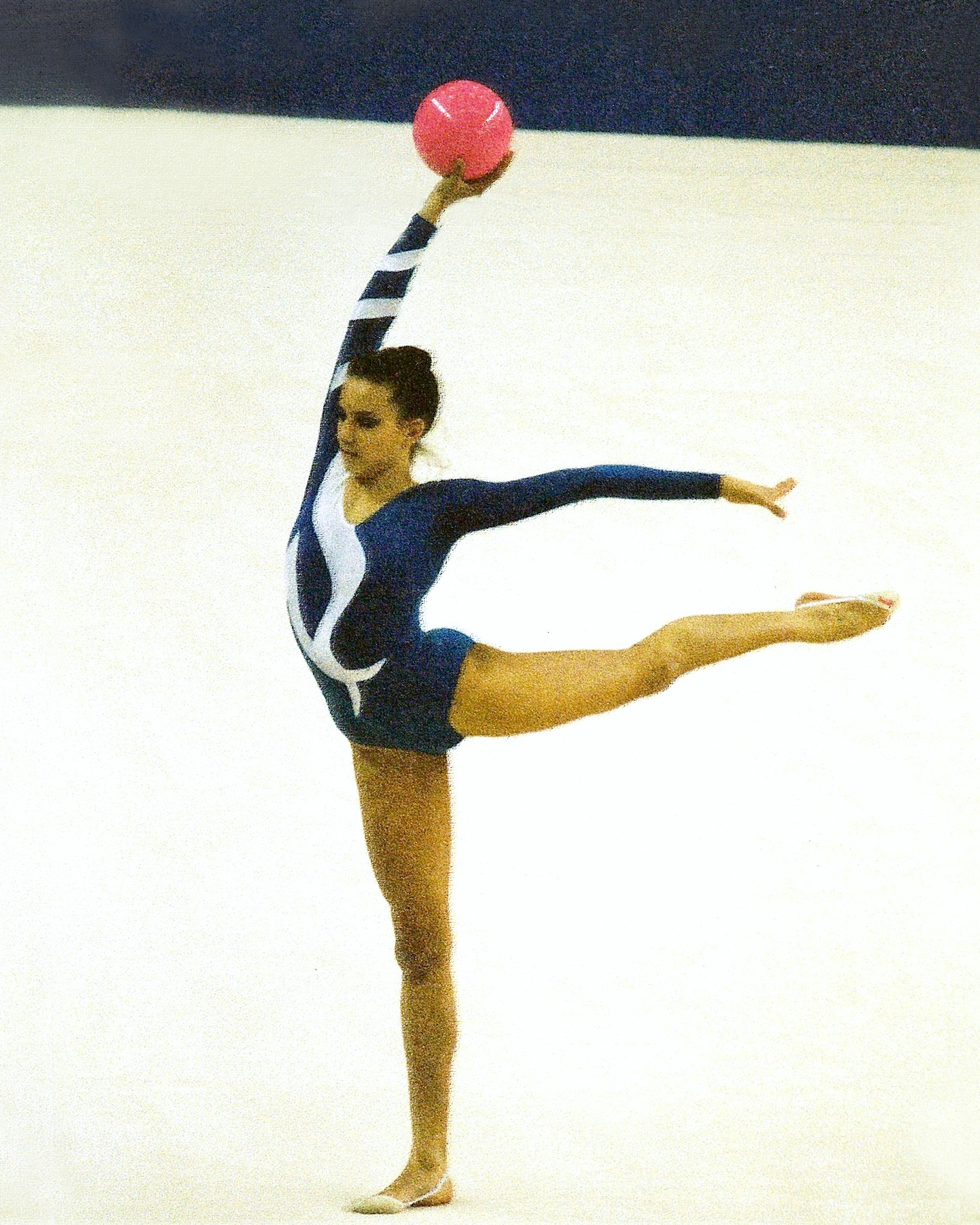
Carmen Acedo

Spain has a long tradition in rhythmic gymnastics. Some notable success in rhythmic gymnastics for Spain include Ana Bautista, who won a gold medal in the rope competition in the European Cup final in 1989, Carolina Pascual, the silver medalist at the 1992 Barcelona Olympics, Carmen Acedo, who won a gold medal in clubs competition in World Championships in 1993, Almudena Cid, whose four Olympic appearances (1996, 2000, 2004 and 2008) are the most of any rhythmic gymnast, and three-time Olympian Carolina Rodriguez.

Spain is more engaged in group rhythmic gymnastics, and the Spanish group became the first to win the Olympic gold in group rhythmic gymnastics when it was added in the 1996 Summer Olympics in Atlanta, with the help of the Bulgarian coach Emilia Boneva. The Spanish group was formed by Marta Baldó, Nuria Cabanillas, Estela Giménez, Lorena Guréndez, Tania Lamarca and Estíbaliz Martínez. The Spanish group also won the silver medal at the 2016 Summer Olympics.

=== Italy ===
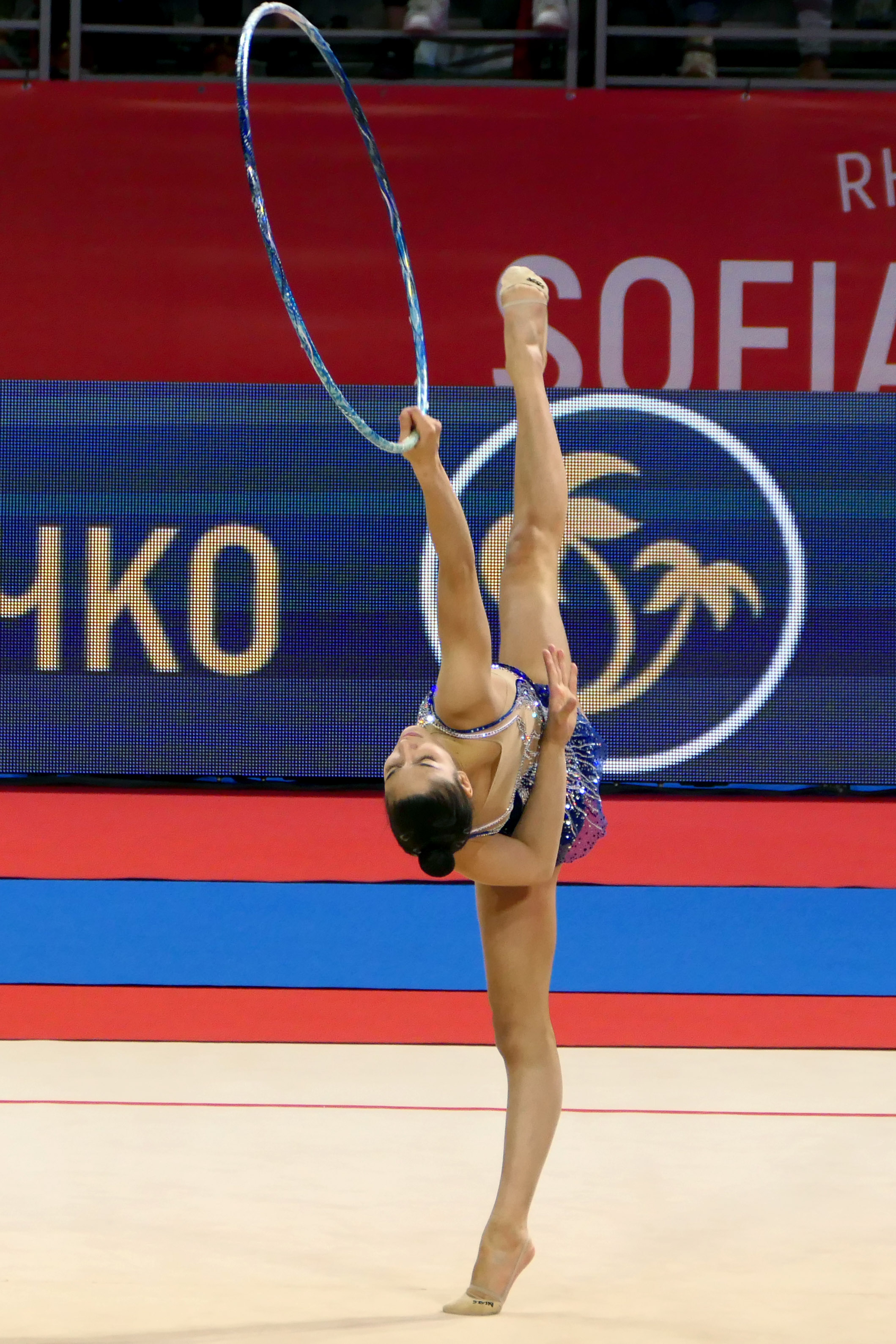
Sofia Raffaeli

Like Spain, Italy is more engaged in group rhythmic gymnastics; since 2004, the Italian group, nicknamed the 'Le Farfalle' or 'The Butterflies', has won nine all-around World Championship medals and three medals (a silver and two bronze) at the Olympic Games.

On the individual level, the 2022 World champion was the Italian Sofia Raffaeli, who also won the bronze medal at the 2024 Summer Olympics.

=== Israel ===
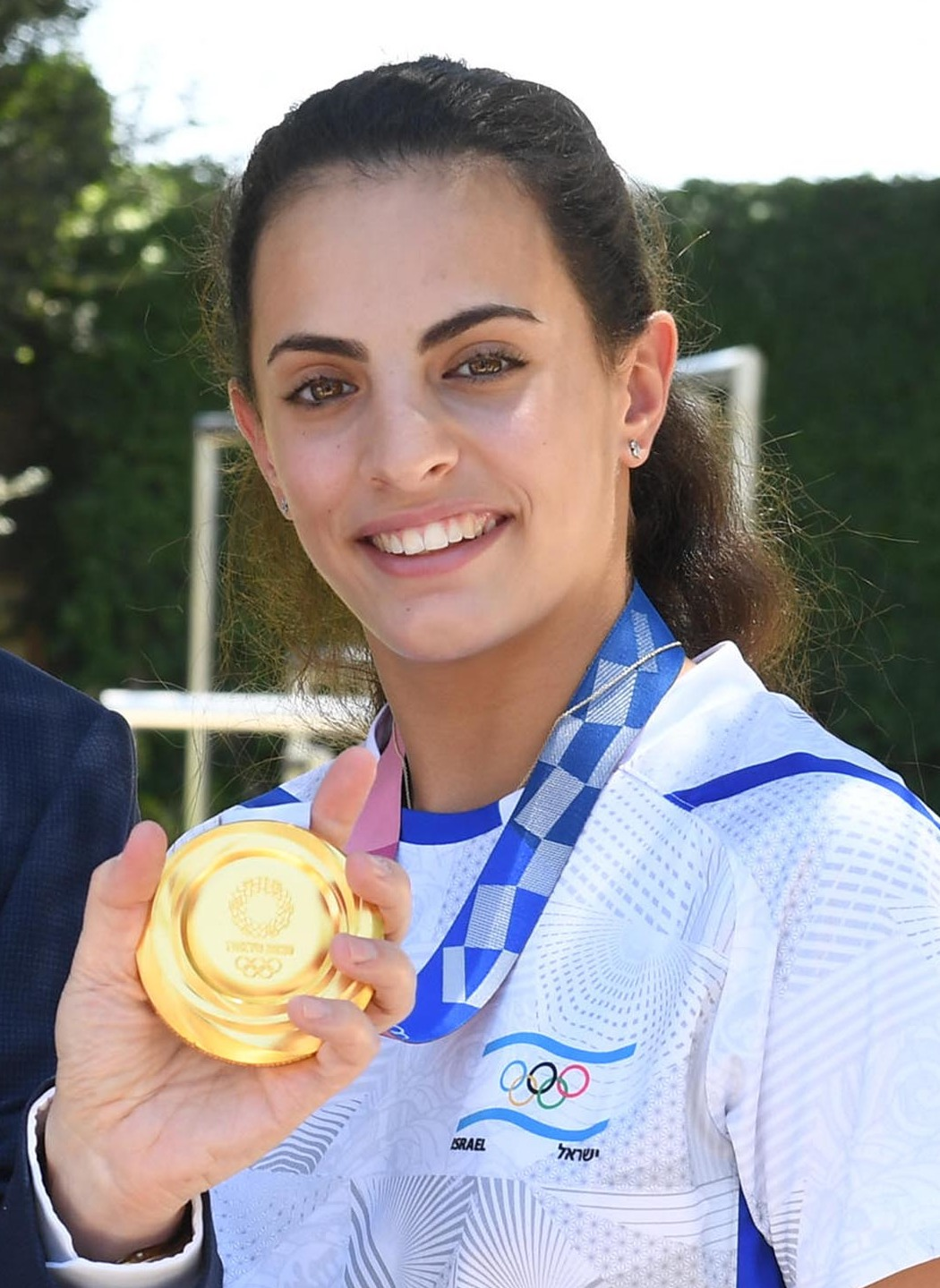
Linoy Ashram

Israel is a rising nation in rhythmic gymnastics. Israeli head coach Irina Vigdorchik, who moved from Moscow to Israel in 1979, said rhythmic gymnastics had been brought to Israel by Russian immigrants in the early 1970s.

The sport began its success in the 2000s with notable Israeli gymnasts including Irina Risenzon and Neta Rivkin, who placed in top ten in the Olympic Games finals. Linoy Ashram was the first Israeli to win the Olympic all-around gold medal; her win was considered an upset over favorite Dina Averina. Other notable gymnasts include European champion Daria Atamanov and Junior World champion Alona Tal Franco.

In the mid-2010s, the Israeli group began to be amongst the leading groups in the World Cup and World Championship competitions and won its first gold medal at the 2016 European Championships. They placed 6th in the Olympic games in both Rio 2016 and Tokyo 2020. The Israeli group won their first World all-around title in 2023, and they went on to win the all-around silver medal at the 2024 Summer Olympics.

=== Other European nations ===
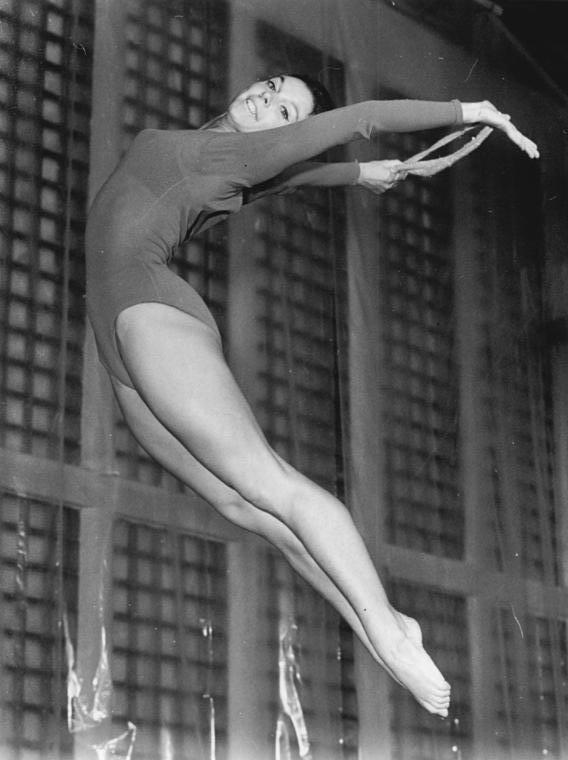
Ute Lehmann

Germany had early success in the sport, especially from the late 1960s to the early 1990s, with World medalists Ute Lehmann, Carmen Rischer, Christiana Rosenberg, Bianca Dittrich and 1984 Olympic medalist Regina Weber. In 2023, German Darja Varfolomeev won all five individual gold medals at the 2023 World Championships and went on to win the individual all-around at the 2024 Summer Olympics.

Czechoslovakia dominated the second World Championships, and their routines there, which combined ballet with whole-body movement, influenced the early direction of the sport. The 1960s and 1970s marked the peak of Czechoslovak rhythmic gymnastics success with World medalists Hana Machatová-Bogušovská, Hana Sitnianská-Mičechová, Zuzana Záveská, Iveta Havlíčková and Daniela Bošanská.

Romania has enjoyed more success in artistic gymnastics but has also had a presence in individual rhythmic gymnastics (especially in the 1980s and 1990s) with gymnasts like Doina Stăiculescu, the 1984 Olympic silver medalist, and Irina Deleanu.

=== Asia and Americas ===
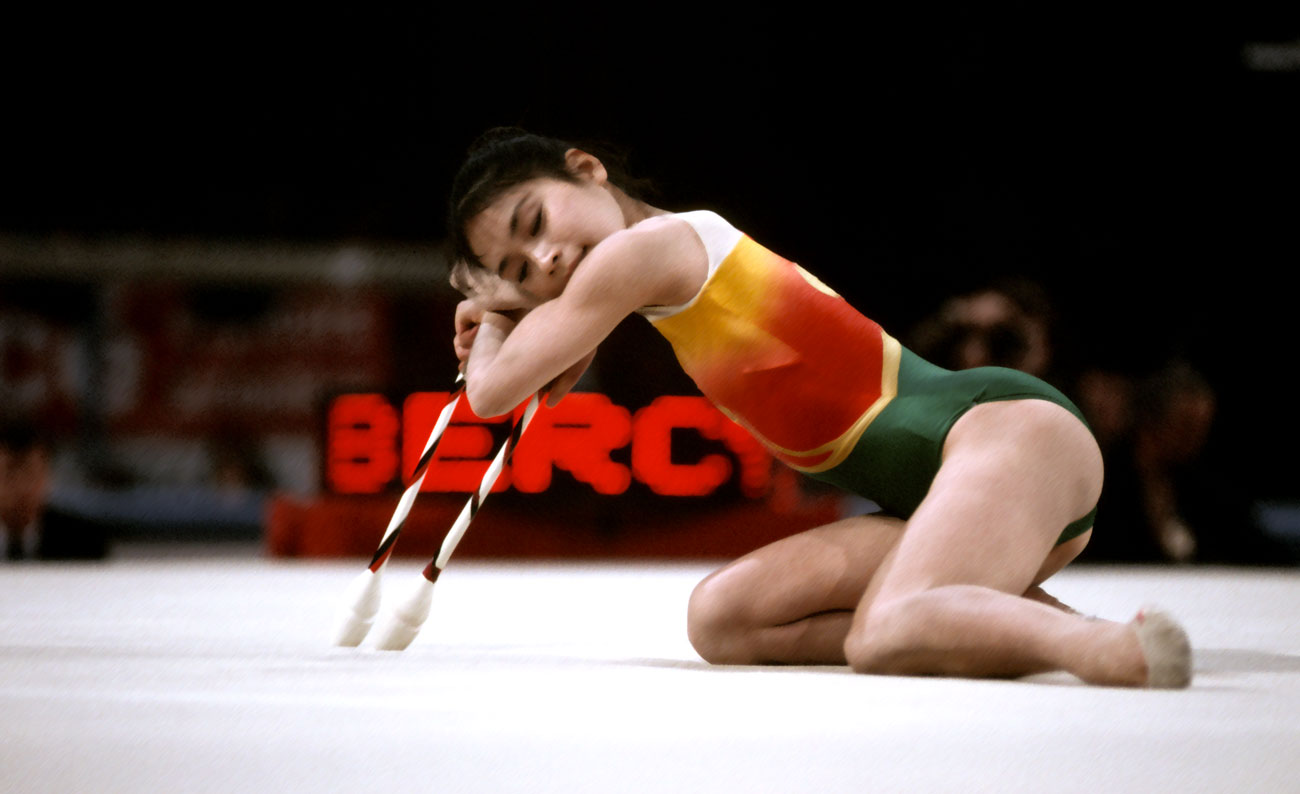
Erika Akiyama

European countries have been always dominant in this sport: only six World Championships have been held outside Europe so far, one in Cuba, one in the US, three in Japan and one in Brazil, and only six individual gymnasts (Sun Duk Jo, Myong Sim Choi, Mitsuru Hiraguchi, Son Yeon-jae, Kaho Minagawa and Rin Keys) and four groups (Japan, North Korea, China and Brazil) from outside Europe have won medals at the World Championships. However, rhythmic gymnastics is growing in other countries.

Japan has a long tradition in group rhythmic gymnastics. Since their first competition in 1971, the Japanese group, known as "Fairy Japan", has never finished lower than 10th (except in 2003, 16th) in the all-around at the World Championships. They won their first World medal in 1975, then won their second in 2017, a bronze in the all-around. In 2019, they won their first World gold medal in the 5 balls apparatus final as well as another silver.

Other countries in East Asia have developed world class gymnasts, such as South Korean Son Yeon-jae, who gained popularity in her home country after she finished fifth at the 2012 Summer Olympics and fourth at the 2016 Summer Olympics. China was the first country outside of Europe to medal at the Olympics in the group event (silver at the 2008 Summer Olympics) and was also the first non-European country to win the Olympic title in the group event at the 2024 Summer Olympics.

Although it has not gained as much of a following compared to its artistic gymnastics counterpart in the Americas, it is a rising sport. Beginning in the 1950s, Evelyn Koop, who graduated from the Ernest Idla Institute in Sweden, promoted the sport in the United States and especially in Canada. Andrea Molnár-Bodó, a gold medalist in the Team Portable Apparatus event as a member of the Hungarian team at the 1956 Summer Olympics, moved to the United States after the Olympics and also promoted rhythmic gymnastics there as a coach and judge. The first Olympic champion, competing in the absence of most of the dominant Eastern European countries due to the boycott of the 1984 Olympics, was Canadian Lori Fung. Brazil was also an early participant in rhythmic gymnastics, sending their first gymnast to the third World championships in 1967, and their group choreography was influential in the 1970s.

== Injuries and health issues ==
Studies on rhythmic gymnastics injuries are complicated by changes in the code of points leading to emphasis on different kinds of elements, making it more difficult to generalize the risks from past studies to current competitors. For example, the 2009–2012 code removed elements that led to knee injuries. The development of muscle strength, agility, and speed in rhythmic gymnasts have also been under-studied. A focus on flexibility training without sufficient strength training can lead to injuries, as can forcing turnout in the feet and over-training.

At the 2008, 2012, and 2016 Olympic Games, rhythmic gymnasts were injured more often than trampoline gymnasts but less often than artistic gymnasts. Overuse injuries are more common than acute injuries. Gymnasts most frequently report pain and injury in the lower back and lower limbs, such as the hip, knee, or ankle. At the 2013 European Championships, gymnasts were surveyed about pain and compared to a matched group of non-athletes. The gymnasts were more likely to report having pain, with the most frequent reports being of pain in the lumbar spine or ankle; however, they were less likely than the control group to report pain in other areas.

When the apparatuses are thrown, they can cause injury if not caught in time; some gymnasts have been hit in the head or eyes.

=== Eating disorders ===
As in other aesthetic sports such as figure skating and artistic gymnastics, body image issues and disordered eating are common. International-level gymnasts are more likely to have disordered eating and low body weight compared to recreational gymnasts.

Long limbs and a slender body are considered ideal for the sport, and judges may be biased against those who do not fit this ideal. Gymnasts and coaches sometimes believe that a lighter weight will prevent injuries and make it easier to perform elements, and gymnasts have reported excessive weight control from coaches and demands to meet arbitrary weight targets as well as the use of unhealthy methods to lose weight. The pressure to lose weight may increase for gymnasts with a higher body mass index, even if they are still quite thin by typical standards. Other gymnastics authority figures such as judges also encourage gymnasts to lose weight, and parents and friends may do so as well.

=== Spinal issues ===
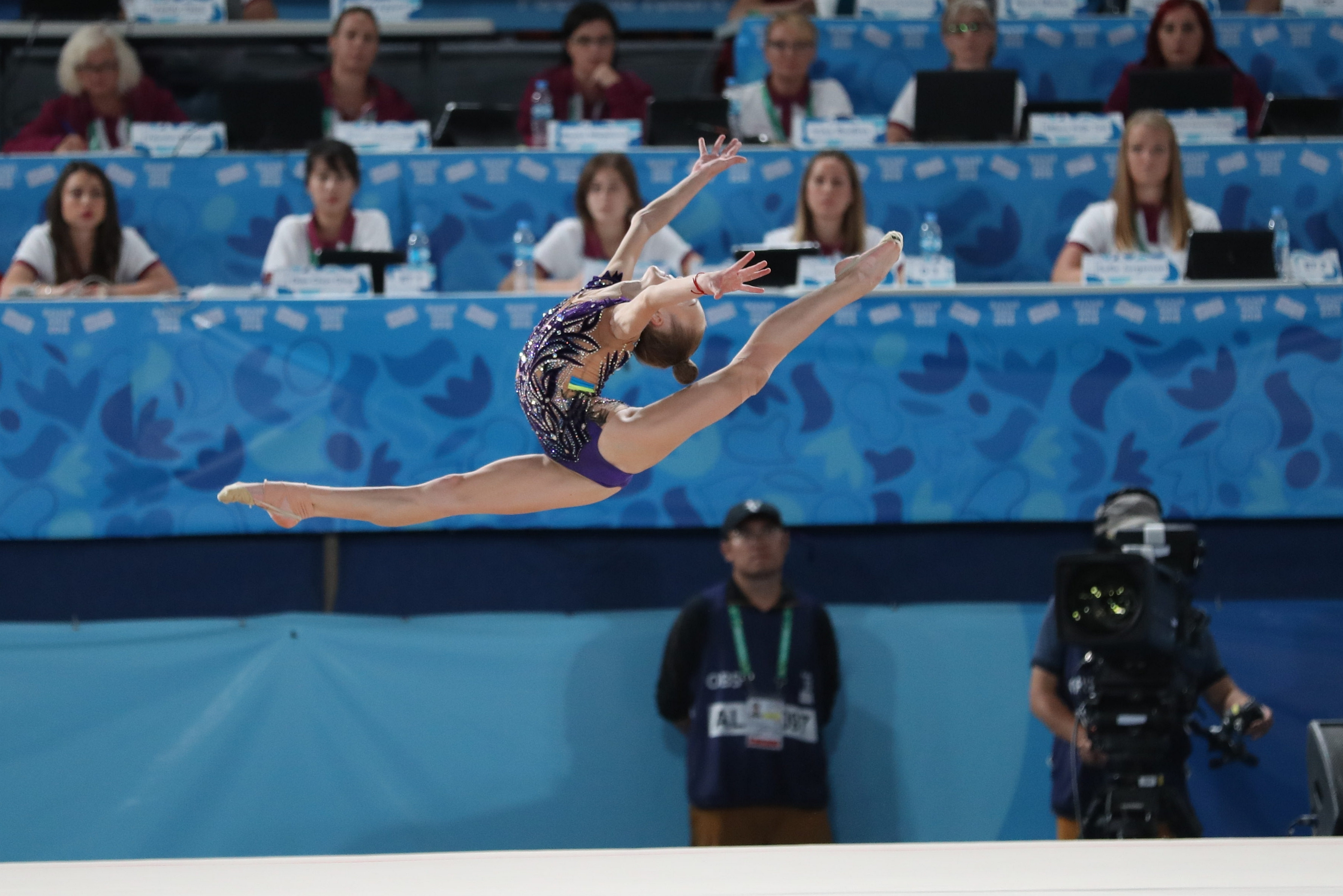
A gymnast (Khrystyna Pohranychna) performing a split leap with back extension

Lower back pain and spinal issues are a common concern in rhythmic gymnastics due to elements requiring hyper-extension of the spine, a lack of strength needed to properly support back extension, and the number of repetitions gymnasts perform in training. A study of routines performed at the 2019 Junior World Championships found that a number of elements were performed with spinal hyper-extension, particularly leaps.

Rhythmic gymnasts are at increased risk of scoliosis and other spinal issues. It is thought that this may be in part due to rhythmic gymnasts tending to have looser joints and delayed menarche as well as from repeatedly performing elements using the dominant side of the torso. Gymnasts are more susceptible to spinal issues such as scoliosis as they grow older and train for more years. However, former elite-level gymnasts may not be at increased risk of back pain once they have completed their career, though those who do experience pain report experiencing it earlier and tend to have retired earlier than gymnasts without pain. The risk may also depend on the codes of points the gymnast competed under and the emphasis put on back hyper-extension in elements at the time the gymnast competed. At lower levels of the sport, rhythmic gymnastics training may have a protective effect against back pain.

== Men's rhythmic gymnastics ==
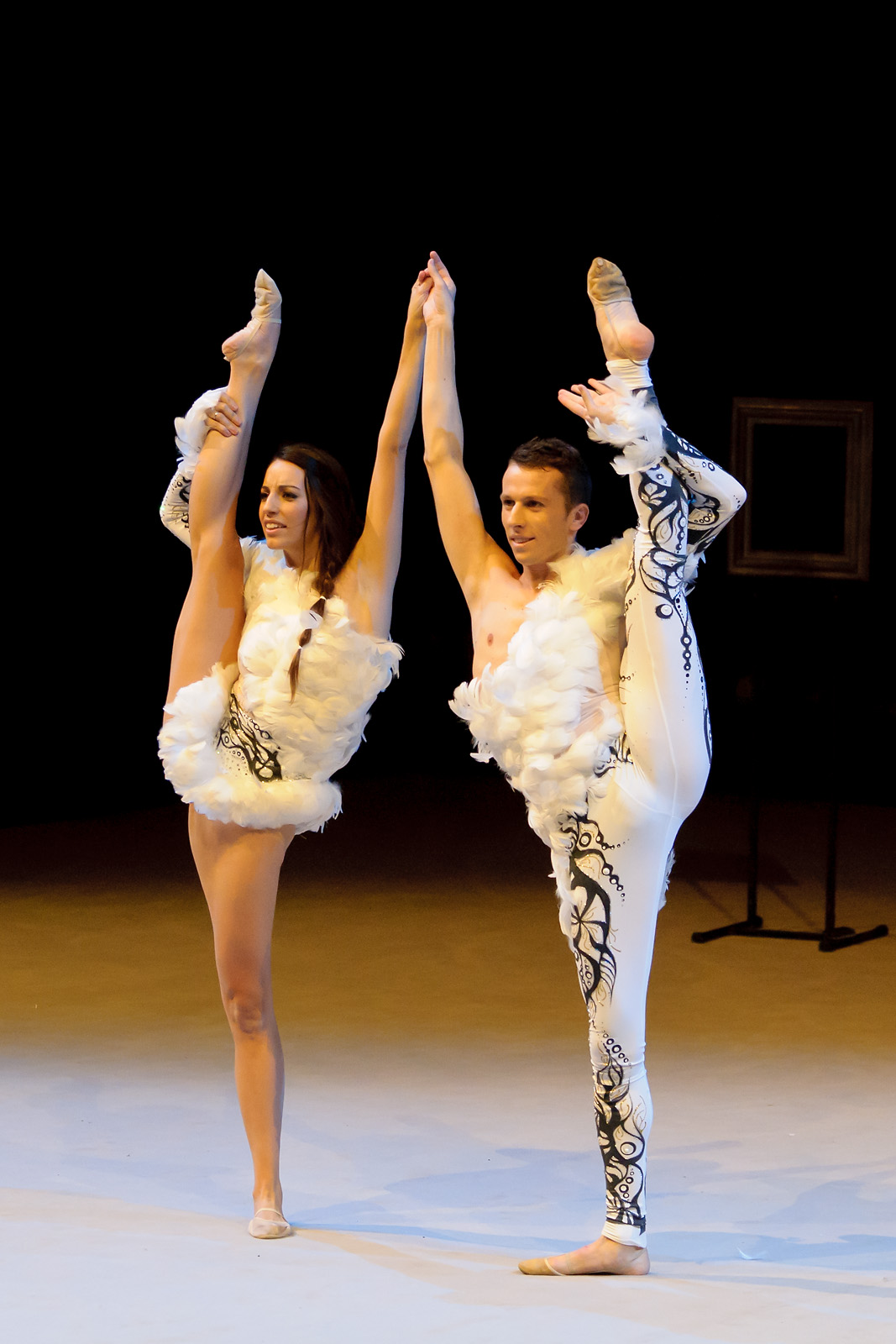
Rubén Orihuela performing with Almudena Cid in 2014

Beginning in 2022, the code of points explicitly states that the wording of the rules applies to people of all genders. However, the FIG currently only allows the participation of women in rhythmic gymnastics. The FIG Gender Equality Commission met in spring 2024 to discuss the lack of men at the international level; the FIG secretary general was reprimanded for making discriminatory comments at the meeting.

However, two versions of men's rhythmic gymnastics exist outside the governance of the FIG. One developed in Japan and uses a spring floor and a different set of apparatuses, and it was originally competed by both men and women before Western rhythmic gymnastics was brought to Japan. The other began development in Spain and uses the same rules and apparatuses as women's rhythmic gymnastics.

=== Japanese men's rhythmic gymnastics ===
Japanese men's rhythmic gymnastics is performed to music on a 13 metres (43 ft) x 13 metres (43 ft) gymnastic spring floor. As with women's rhythmic gymnastics, there are two types of routines: group events (always freehand, meaning no apparatus), originally with six people and with five since 2024, and individual events performed using an apparatus (stick, rings, rope, or clubs). Athletes are judged on some of the same physical abilities and skills as their female counterparts, such as hand/body/eye co-ordination, but they are also permitted to perform tumbling. Strength and power are the main focus, as well as apparatus handling, flexibility and movements called "Toshu" ("freehand").

In 2021, it was estimated there are about 1,500 participants in Japan, with small individual programs in other countries such as Canada and Russia, and some former gymnasts have moved to the United States to work for Cirque du Soleil. It may be called by other names in other countries, as the feminine stereotype of the term "rhythmic gymnastics" makes it more difficult to recruit boys into programs. Proponents of Japanese-style men's rhythmic gymnastics in other countries sometimes emphasize its perceived masculine qualities in contrast with the Spanish or women's version.

==== History ====
Men's rhythmic gymnastics in Japan was originally created by adopting elements from Swedish, Danish, and German gymnastics. It has been taught and performed with the aim of improving physical strength and health as early as the 1940s, and the national intercollegiate competition began in 1949.

Originally, both boys and girls used to perform this type of gymnastics, called "Dantai Toshu Taisou", literally "group freehand gymnastics". In 1967, the name "Shintaisou" ("new gymnastics") was adopted as a translation of "Modern Gymnastics," which was practiced in Northern and Central Europe in schools such as Medau's. Women's rhythmic gymnastics - originally also called "Modern Gymnastics" - was also imported to Japan under the name "Shintaisou", and women began to perform the international version of the sport instead. However, there are clubs that allow women to train in men's rhythmic gymnastics, and some club competitions include a category for mixed-gender groups. Currently, men's and women's rhythmic gymnastics are both under the umbrella of the Japan Gymnastics Association, and major competitions for both are often held at the same venue.

==== Scoring ====
For both individuals and groups, points are divided into three scores: difficulty, artistry, and execution. The first score, difficulty, is based on the technical value of the elements performed in the routine. The artistic score is scored out of a maximum of 10 points and is based on harmony between music and movements, use of space, and originality, with deductions for lack of required elements or stepping out of bounds, and so on. Execution is scored out of a maximum of 10 points, based on quality of execution, accuracy of performance, and synchronization, with deductions taken for mistakes or lack of movements in unison, etc.

For individual performances, a gymnast manipulates one or two pieces of apparatus (double rings, stick, clubs, rope) to demonstrate their skill at apparatus handling, throws, and catches as well as the difficulty of the tumbling. The gymnast must work the entire floor area whilst showing continuous flowing movement. The permitted time for individual events is between 1 minute 15 seconds and 1 minute 30 seconds. During a competition, each individual gymnast performs four separate routines, one for each apparatus. The individual scores of all four routines for each gymnast are then added up to decide the all-around winner.

Group performances are done without using any apparatus and focus on synchronization between the athletes and complicated tumbling; teams even train to breathe at the same times. The permitted time for group events is between 2 minutes 15 seconds and 2 minutes 30 seconds.

==== Internationalization ====
Competitors from other countries have been included during the men's event at the All-Japan Rhythmic Gymnastics Championships several times; in 2003, gymnasts came from Malaysia, South Korea, Canada, and the United States. The 2005 Championships also included competitors from Australia, Russia, and Mexico. In 2021, Russia began holding a national men's rhythmic gymnastics championships.

In 2013, the Aomori University Men's Rhythmic Gymnastics Team collaborated with renowned Japanese fashion designer Issey Miyake and American choreographer Daniel Ezralow (Spiderman, Cirque du Soleil) to create a one-hour contemporary performance, "Flying Bodies, Soaring Spirits," that featured all 27 Aomori men's rhythmic gymnasts outfitted in Miyake's signature costumes. Held July 18, 2013 at Yoyogi National Stadium in Tokyo, the show drew an audience of 2,600. "Flying Bodies" was also captured in a 78-minute documentary by director Hiroyuki Nakano that follows the coaches, gymnasts and creative team for the three months leading up to the performance. Men's rhythmic gymnasts from Aomori University also performed at the 2016 Summer Olympics closing ceremony.

=== Spanish men's rhythmic gymnastics ===
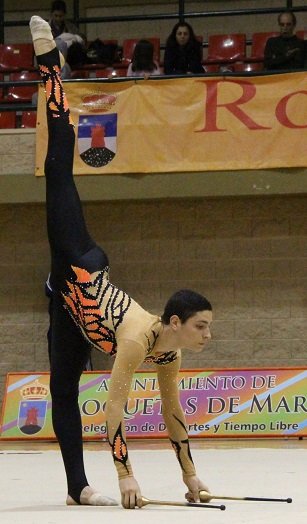
A Spanish gymnast (Adrián Munuera) at an exhibition in 2017

Some male rhythmic gymnasts, primarily in Europe, train and perform in the same way as their female counterparts using generally the same rules as for women's rhythmic gymnastics. Prominent advocates include Rubén Orihuela (Spain) and Peterson Céüs (France); in Spain, Almudena Cid, a four-time Olympian, has also been a supporter of men's rhythmic gymnastics. Participants in this style of men's rhythmic gymnastics face significant challenges due to gender stereotypes and cultural ideas about what sports are acceptable for men.

==== History ====
Spain is a pioneer country in men's rhythmic gymnastics. In 2005, the Spanish federation allowed men to compete in an open category at the national championships; each autonomous community was allowed to submit two gymnasts in this category, who could be foreign gymnasts or men. In 2009, this category was closed to men after the FIG released a statement that they had no rules for men's competition, as rhythmic gymnastics was a sport for women only, because the Spanish federation was afraid of being sanctioned. However, the federation soon announced that there would be a separate category for men using the same rules as the open category. The first year, a dozen gymnasts competed in the men's competition. In 2020, a mixed-gender category was added for groups.

In France, men have been allowed to compete in rhythmic gymnastics since 1989 and at a national level in 2008. However, they may not compete at the highest levels. In a case brought to the Conseil d'État, it was ruled that the lack of a men's category was not discriminatory. Fewer than 30 male rhythmic gymnasts were registered in 2000; in 2017, 50 were registered, and by 2022, the number had increased to 385.

Chile also allows for men to compete, and a few (nine in 2024) have done so; in some cases, they compete in the same category as women. A small number of men in other countries such as Mexico, Bulgaria, Greece, and Italy have also trained in rhythmic gymnastics, and some have competed in unofficial competitions or the Spanish championships.

== See also ==
- Artistic gymnastics
- Aesthetic group gymnastics
- List of notable rhythmic gymnasts
- List of medalists at the Rhythmic Gymnastics FIG World Cup Final
- List of medalists at the Rhythmic Gymnastics Grand Prix circuit
- List of medalists at the UEG European Cup Final
- List of Olympic medalists in rhythmic gymnastics
- Major achievements in gymnastics by nation
