= List of medalists at the Rhythmic Gymnastics Grand Prix circuit =

- List of medalists at the Rhythmic Gymnastics Grand Prix circuit (1994–2003)
- List of medalists at the Rhythmic Gymnastics Grand Prix circuit (2004–2013)
- List of medalists at the Rhythmic Gymnastics Grand Prix circuit (2014–2023)
- List of medalists at the Rhythmic Gymnastics Grand Prix circuit (2024–2033)
