= List of rhythmic gymnasts =

Rhythmic gymnasts are athletes that train an average of 8 hours a day, to compete in the sport of gymnastics, specifically rhythmic gymnastics. This is a list of those who are considered to be notable rhythmic gymnasts in their countries.

Australia
Gymnast	Dates	FIG listing
Alexandra Aristoteli	24 May 1997	Alexandra Aristoteli
Lidiia Iakovleva	28 August 2003	Lidiia Iakovleva
Naazmi Johnston	28 November 1988	Naazmi Johnston
Alexandra Kiroi-Bogatyreva	4 March 2002	Alexandra Kiroi-Bogatyreva
Alannah Mathews	9 April 1999	Alannah Mathews
Janine Murray	10 March 1990	Janine Murray
Himeka Onoda	5 March 1998	Himeka Onoda
Danielle Prince	12 June 1992	Danielle Prince
Kasumi Takahashi	6 May 1980	Kasumi Takahashi
Naazmi Johnston Janine Murray Danielle Prince Alexandra Kiroi-Bogatyreva Lidiia Iakovleva

Austria
Gymnast	Dates	FIG listing
Nicol Ruprecht	2 October 1992	Nicol Ruprecht
Caroline Weber	31 May 1986	Caroline Weber
Nicol Ruprecht Caroline Weber

Azerbaijan
Gymnast	Dates	FIG listing
Zohra Aghamirova	8 August 2001	Zohra Aghamirova
Marina Durunda	12 June 1997	Marina Durunda
Dinara Gimatova	18 November 1986	Dinara Gimatova
Anna Gurbanova	24 September 1986	Anna Gurbanova
Aliya Garayeva	1 January 1988	Aliya Garayeva
Zeynab Javadli	19 July 1991	Zeynab Javadli
Zhala Piriyeva	10 May 2000	Zhala Piriyeva
Lala Yusifova	16 October 1996	Lala Yusifova
Aliya Garayeva Marina Durunda Zohra Aghamirova

Belarus
Gymnast	Dates	FIG listing
Hanna Bazhko	25 July 1998	Hanna Bazhko
Liubov Charkashyna	23 December 1987	Liubov Charkashyna
Arina Charopa	18 October 1995	Arina Charopa
Olga Gontar	11 January 1979	Olga Gontar
Katsiaryna Halkina	25 February 1997	Katsiaryna Halkina
Alina Harnasko	9 August 2001	Alina Harnasko
Maria Kadobina	4 February 1997	Maria Kadobina
Nataliya Leshchyk	25 July 1995	Nataliya Leshchyk
Marina Lobatch	26 June 1970	Marina Lobatch
Larissa Loukianenko	7 August 1973	Larissa Loukianenko
Aliaksandra Narkevich	22 December 1995	Aliaksandra Narkevich
Tatiana Ogrizko	28 May 1976	Tatiana Ogryzko
Evgenia Pavlina	20 July 1978	Evgenia Pavlina
Yulia Raskina	19 April 1982	Yulia Raskina
Melitina Staniouta	15 November 1993	Melitina Staniouta
Elena Tkachenko	31 July 1983	Elena Tkachenko
Mariya Trubach	15 November 1999	Mariya Trubach
Alina Tumilovich	21 April 1990	Alina Tumilovich
Inna Zhukova	6 September 1986	Inna Zhukova
Yulia Raskina Liubov Charkashyna Melitina Staniouta Inna Zhukova

Brazil
Gymnast	Dates	FIG listing
Maria Eduarda Arakaki	12 August 2003	Maria Eduarda Arakaki
Angélica Kvieczynski	1 September 1991	Angélica Kvieczynski
Bárbara Domingos	2 March 2000	Bárbara Domingos
Natália Gaudio	18 December 1992	Natalia Gaudio
Angélica Kvieczynski Maria Eduarda Arakaki

Bulgaria
Gymnast	Dates	FIG listing
Boyanka Angelova	28 October 1994	Boyanka Angelova
Eva Brezalieva	13 January 2005	Eva Brezalieva
Diliana Gueorguieva	18 February 1965	Diliana Georguieva
Adriana Dunavska	21 April 1970	Adriana Dunavska
Simona Dyankova	7 December 1994	Simona Dyankova
Maria Gigova	21 April 1947	Maria Gigova
Kristina Guiourova	17 February 1959	Kristina Guiourova
Lilia Ignatova	17 May 1975	Lilia Ignatova
Sofia Ivanova	15 September 2005	Sofia Ivanova
Lyubomira Kazanova	23 May 1996	Lyubomira Kazanova
Boryana Kaleyn	23 August 2000	Boryana Kaleyn
Reneta Kamberova	12 September 1990	Reneta Kamberova
Elizabeth Koleva	11 November 1972	Elizabeth Koleva
Stefani Kiryakova	5 January 2001	Stefani Kiryakova
Mihaela Maevska	4 October 1990	Mihaela Maevska
Katerina Marinova	13 July 1999	Katerina Marinova
Mila Marinova	3 June 1975	Mila Marinova
Sylvia Miteva	24 June 1986	Sylvia Miteva
Stiliana Nikolova	22 August 2005	Stiliana Nikolova
Tsvetelina Naydenova	28 April 1994	Tsvetelina Naydenova
Elizabeth Paisieva	12 December 1986	Elizabeth Paisieva
Bianka Panova	27 May 1970	Bianka Panova
Maria Petrova	13 November 1975	Maria Petrova
Simona Peycheva	14 May 1985	Simona Peycheva
Diana Popova	10 December 1976	Diana Popova
Madlen Radukanova	14 May 2000	Madlen Radukanova
Anelia Ralenkova	25 January 1964	Anelia Ralenkova
Iliana Raeva	15 March 1963	Iliana Raeva
Neshka Robeva	25 May 1946	Neshka Robeva
Katrin Taseva	24 November 1997	Katrin Taseva
Laura Traets	13 December 1998	Laura Traets
Hristiana Todorova	28 November 1994	Hristiana Todorova
Julia Trashlieva	3 February 1936	Julia Trashlieva
Neviana Vladinova	23 February 1994	Neviana Vladinova
Tatyana Volozhanina	28 January 2003	Tatyana Volozhanina
Erika Zafirova	7 May 1999	Erika Zafirova
Maria Gigova Bianka Panova Maria Petrova Neviana Vladinova

Canada
Gymnast	Dates	FIG listing
Patricia Bezzoubenko	21 February 1997	Patricia Bezzoubenko
Tatiana Cocsanova	16 January 2004	Tatiana Cocasanova
Lori Fung	21 February 1963	Lori Fung
Carmel Kallemaa	8 October 1997	Carmel Kalleemaa
Maria Kitkarska	13 July 1995	Maria Kitkarska
Alexandra Orlando	19 January 1987	Alexandra Orlando
Mary Sanders (Note: Mary Sanders holds dual US and Canadian nationality started her career representing Canada and then represented the USA)	26 August 1985	Mary Sanders
Suzanna Shahbazian	18 October 2004	Suzanna Shahbazian

Chile Chile
Gymnast	Dates	FIG listing
Javiera Rubilar	6 April 2000	Javiera Rubilar
Martina Ferrari	9 May 2006	Martina Ferrari
Montserrat Urrutia	29 September 2001	Montserrat Urrutia

China
Gymnast	Dates	FIG listing
Deng Senyue	15 February 1992	Deng Senyue
Shang Rong	12 February 2000	Shang Rong
Sun Dan	4 September 1986	Sun Dan
Zhong Ling	30 October 1983	Ling Zhong
Zhang Shuo	5 January 1984	Zhang Shuo
Zhao Yating	12 May 2001	Zhao Yating
Wang Zilu	18 June 2003	Wang Zilu
Wang Zilu

Cyprus
Gymnast	Dates	FIG listing
Chrystalleni Trikomiti	30 November 1993	Chrystalleni Trikomiti
Chrystalleni Trikomiti

Czech Republic
Gymnast	Dates	FIG listing
Hana Machatová-Bogušovská	31 July 1938	Hana Machatová-Bogušovská
Dominika Červenková	18 April 1988	Dominika Cervenkova; Dominika Cervenkova (Note: Dominika Cervenkova has two FIG records with differing levels of detail, but identical personal data)
Monika Mickova	29 July 1991	Monika Míčková
Hana Mičechová	25 January 1946	Hana Mičechova-Sitnianská
Dominika Červenková

Egypt
Gymnast	Dates	FIG listing
Login Elsasyed	1 January 2003	Login Elsasyed
Polina Fouda	17 June 2003	Polina Fouda
Habiba Marzouk	14 May 2002	Habiba Marzouk
Sara Rostom	1996	Sara Rostom
Salma Saleh	19 December 2003	Salma Saleh
Malak Selim	1 May 2003	Malak Selim
Tia Sobhy	7 February 2003	Tia Sobhy

Finland
Gymnast	Dates	FIG listing
Jouki Tikkanen	5 July 1995	Jouki Tikkanen
Ekaterina Volkova	2 July 1997	Ekaterina Volkova
Jouki Tikkanen

Estonia
Gymnast	Dates	FIG listing
Olga Bogdanova	24 December 1994	Olga Bogdanova
Viktoria Bogdanova	24 December 1994	Viktoria Bogdanova
Irina Kikkas	22 July 1984	Irina Kikkas

France
Gymnast	Dates	FIG listing
Nathalie Fauquette	23 March 1987	Nathalie Fauquette
Hélène Karbanov	29 December 2004	Hélène Karbanov
Delphine Ledoux	15 May 1985	Delphine Ledoux
Maelle Millet	22 August 2004	Maelle Millet
Kseniya Moustafaeva	8 June 1995	Kseniya Moustafaeva
Lily Ramonatxo	24 February 2005	Lily Ramonatxo
Eva Serrano	22 April 1978	Eva Serrano
Eva Serrano Delphine Ledoux

Georgia
Gymnast	Dates	FIG listing
Irina Gabashvili	15 August 1960 - 23 March 2009	Irina Gabashvili
Salome Pazhava	3 September 1997	Salome Pazhava

Germany
Gymnast	Dates	FIG listing
Jana Berezko-Marggrander	17 October 1995	Jana Berezko-Marggrander
Magdalena Brzeska	14 May 1978	Magdalena Brzeska
Lisa Ingildeeva	4 December 1988	Lisa Ingildeeva
Laura Jung	25 June 1995	Laura Jung
Ute Lehmann		Ute Lehmann
Margarita Kolosov	11 March 2004	Margarita Kolosov
Edita Schaufler	11 July 1980	Edita Schaufler
Carmen Rischer	16 May 1956	Carmen Rischer
Christiana Rosenberg	1958	Christiana Rosenberg
Darja Varfolomeev	4 November 2006	Darja Varfolomeev
Regina Weber	12 April 1963	Regina Weber
Magdalena Brzeska Jana Berezko-Marggrander Regina Weber Laura Jung Ute Lehmann Margarita Kolosov Darja Varfolomeev

Greece
Gymnast	Dates	FIG listing
Eleni Andriola	9 November 1986	Eleni Andriola
Eleni Kelaiditi	1 April 2000	Eleni Kelaiditi
Panagiota Lytra	14 December 2006	Panagiota Lytra
Varvara Filiou	29 December 1994	Varvara Filiou
Panagiota Lytra

Hungary
Gymnast	Dates	FIG listing
Viktória Fráter	30 November 1993	Viktória Fráter
Fanni Pigniczki	23 January 2000	Fanni Pigniczki
Dóra Vass	8 September 1991	Dóra Vass
Viktória Fráter Fanni Pigniczki

Israel
Gymnast	Dates	FIG listing
Linoy Ashram	13 May 1999	Linoy Ashram
Daria Atamanov	6 December 2005	Daria Atamanov
Noga Block	2004	Noga Block
Olena Dvornichenko	3 November 1990	Olena Dvornichenko
Adi Asya Katz	31 March 2004	Adi Asya Katz
Victoria Veinberg Filanovsky	23 February 1995	Victoria Veinberg Filanovsky
Katia Pisetsky	26 February 1986	Katia Pisetsky
Irina Risenzon	14 January 1988	Irina Risenzon
Neta Rivkin	19 June 1991	Neta Rivkin
Maria Savenkov	2 August 1988	Maria Savenkov
Meital Maayam Sumkin	17 April 2009	Meital Maayam Sumkin
Yuliana Telegina	22 March 2002	Yuliana Telegina
Rahel Vigdozchik	1 May 1989	Rahel Vigdozchik
Veronika Vitenberg	9 September 1988	Veronika Vitenberg
Polina Zakaluzny	21 February 1992	Polina Zakaluzny
Nicol Zelikman	30 January 2001	Nicol Zelikman
Irina Risenzon Linoy Ashram Adi Asya Katz Noga Block Neta Rivkin Yuliana Telegina Daria Atamanov Nicol Zelikman

Italy
Gymnast	Dates	FIG listing
Alexandra Agiurgiuculese	15 January 2001	Alexandra Agiurgiuculese
Milena Baldassarri	16 October 2001	Milena Baldassarri
Veronica Bertolini	19 October 1995	Veronica Bertolini
Elisa Blanchi	13 October 1987	Elisa Blanchi
Julieta Cantaluppi	24 January 1985	Julieta Cantaluppi
Romina Laurito	4 April 1987	Romina Laurito
Alessia Maurelli	22 August 1996	Alessia Maurelli
Marta Pagnini	21 January 1991	Marta Pagnini
Sofia Raffaeli	19 January 2004	Sofia Raffaeli
Elisa Santoni	10 December 1987	Elisa Santoni
Anzhelika Savrayuk	23 August 1989	Anzhelika Savrayuk
Andreea Stefanescu	13 December 1993	Andreea Stefanescu
Milena Baldassarri Sofia Raffaeli

Japan
Gymnast	Dates	FIG listing
Kaho Minagawa	20 August 1997	Kaho Minagawa
Airi Hatakeyama	16 August 1994	Airi Hatakeyama
Sakura Hayakawa	17 March 1997	Sakura Hayakawa
Sumire Kita	11 January 2001	Sumire Kita
Mao Kunii	5 April 1996	Mao Kunii
Rie Matsubara	21 October 1993	Rie Matsubara
Chisaki Oiwa	20 November 2001	Chisaki Oiwa
Sayuri Sugimoto	25 January 1996	Sayuri Sugimoto
Kiko Yokota	11 May 1997	Kiko Yokota
Kaho Minagawa

Kazakhstan
Gymnast	Dates	FIG listing
Alina Adilkhanova	26 September 2001	Alina Adilkhanova
Anna Alyabyeva	13 November 1993	Anna Alyabyeva
Aliya Assymova	16 December 1997	Aliya Assymova
Sabina Ashirbayeva	5 November 1998	Sabina Ashirbayeva
Elzhana Taniyeva	5 September 2005	Elzhana Taniyeva
Aliya Yussupova	15 April 1984	Aliya Yussupova
Aliya Yussupova Elzhana Taniyeva

Mexico
Gymnast	Dates	FIG listing
Rut Castillo	16 September 1990	Rut Castillo
Marina Malpica	4 January 2000	Marina Malpica
Cynthia Valdez	11 December 1987	Cynthia Valdez
Marina Malpica

Poland
Gymnast	Dates	FIG listing
Liliana Lewińska	2 November 2008	Liliana Lewińska
Joanna Mitrosz	21 August 1988	Joanna Mitrosz
Aleksandra Szutenberg	15 October 1988	Aleksandra Szutenberg
Joanna Mitrosz Liliana Lewińska

Romania
Gymnast	Dates	FIG listing
Irina Deleanu	12 November 1975	Irina Deleanu
Christina Dragan	19 April 2007	Christina Dragan
Ana Luiza Filiorianu	10 July 1999	Ana Luiza Filiorianu
Amalia Lica	11 May 2009	Amalia Lica
Denisa Mailat	11 October 2002	Denisa Mailat
Alexandra Piscupescu	10 June 1994	Alexandra Piscupescu
Doina Stăiculescu	27 January 1967	Doina Stăiculescu
Andreea Verdes	18 October 2000	Andreea Verdes
Irina Deleanu Doina Stăiculescu

Russia
Gymnast	Dates	FIG listing
Margarita Aliychuk	10 August 1990	Margarita Aliychuk
Daria Anenkova	2 April 1999	Daria Anenkova
Irina Annenkova	22 February 1999	Irina Annenkova
Arina Averina	13 August 1998	Arina Averina
Dina Averina	13 August 1998	Dina Averina
Yulia Barsukova	31 December 1978	Yulia Barsukova
Yanina Batyrchina	7 October 1979	Yanina Batyrchina
Galina Beloglazova	10 June 1967	Galina Beloglazova
Olga Belova	22 January 1983	Olga Belova
Vera Biryukova	11 April 1998	Vera Biryukova
Anastasia Bliznyuk	28 June 1994	Anastasia Bliznyuk
Diana Borisova	21 March 1997	Diana Borisova
Iuliia Bravikova	17 July 1999	Iuliia Bravikova
Irina Devina	8 May 1959	Irina Devina
Daria Dmitrieva	22 June 1993	Daria Dmitrieva
Uliana Donskova	24 August 1992	Uliana Donskova
Tatiana Druchinina	18 April 1969	Tatiana Druchinina
Daria Dubova	29 January 1999	Daria Dubova
Ksenia Dudkina	25 February 1995	Ksenia Dudkina
Alina Ermolova	27 February 2001	Alina Ermolova
Anna Gavrilenko	10 July 1990	Anna Gavrilenko
Zarina Gizikova	20 June 1985	Zarina Gizikova
Tatiana Gorbunova	23 January 1990	Tatiana Gorbunova
Olga Ilina	3 January 1995	Olga Ilina
Victoria Ilina	28 March 1999	Victoria Ilina
Alina Kabaeva	12 May 1983	Alina Kabaeva
Evgenia Kanaeva	2 April 1990	Evgenia Kanaeva
Olga Kapranova	6 December 1987	Olga Kapranova
Elena Karpuchina	21 March 1951	Elena Karpuchina
Daria Kondakova	30 July 1991	Daria Kondakova
Oxana Kostina	15 April 1973 - 11 February 1993	Oxana Kostina
Lala Kramarenko	6 December 2004	Lala Kramarenko
Yana Kudryavtseva	30 September 1997	Yana Kudryavtseva
Natalia Lavrova	4 August 1984 – 23 April 2010	Natalia Lavrova
Natalia Lipkovskaya	24 April 1979	Natalia Lipkovskaya
Yana Lukonina	26 September 1993	Yana Lukonina
Margarita Mamun	1 November 1995	Margarita Mamun
Alina Makarenko	14 January 1995	Alina Makarenko
Anastasia Maksimova	27 June 1991	Anastasia Maksimova
Alexandra Merkulova	25 November 1995	Alexandra Merkulova
Anastasia Nazarenko	17 January 1993	Anastasia Nazarenko
Natalia Pichuzhkina	3 June 1991	Natalia Pichuzhkina
Yelena Posevina	13 February 1986	Yelena Posevina
Julia Rosliakova	5 January 1975	Julia Rosliakova
Natalia Safonova	17 July 1999	Natalia Safonova
Ekaterina Selezneva	18 May 1995	Ekaterina Selezneva
Maria Sergeeva	7 February 2001	Maria Sergeeva
Vera Sessina	23 February 1986	Vera Sessina
Karolina Sevastyanova	25 April 1995	Karolina Sevastyanova
Daria Shkurikhina	3 October 1990	Daria Shkurikhina
Polina Shmatko	26 March 2003	Polina Shmatko
Galima Shugurova	8 November 1953	Galima Shugurova
Sofya Skomorokh	18 August 1999	Sofya Skomorokh
Aleksandra Soldatova	1 June 1998	Aleksandra Soldatova
Daria Svatkovskaya	4 December 1996	Daria Svatkovskaya
Anastasiia Tatareva	19 July 1997	Anastasiia Tatareva
Irina Tchachina	24 April 1982	Irina Tchachina
Maria Titova	19 August 1997	Maria Titova
Maria Tolkacheva	8 August 1997	Maria Tolkacheva
Daria Trubnikova	1 January 2003	Daria Trubnikova
Laysan Utiasheva	28 June 1985	Laysan Utiasheva
Amina Zaripova	10 August 1976	Amina Zaripova
Evgenia Kanaeva Alina Kabaeva Yana Kudryavtseva Margarita Mamun Yulia Barsukova Irina Tchachina Arina Averina Dina Averina Daria Trubnikova

South Africa
Gymnast	Dates	FIG listing
Grace Legote	2 May 1992	Grace Legote

Slovenia
Gymnast	Dates	FIG listing
Monija Cebasek	11 April 1997	Monija Cebasek
Aja Jerman	20 August 1999	Aja Jerman Bukavec
Sara Kragulj	26 October 1996	Sara Kragulj
Spela Kratochwill	27 January 1998	Spela Kratochwill
Aleksandra Podgoršek	22 July 2001	Aleksandra Podgoršek
Tjaša Šeme	18 November 1986	Tjasa Seme
Ekaterina Vedeneeva	23 June 1994	Ekaterina Vedneeva

South Korea
Gymnast	Dates	FIG listing
Shin Soo-ji	8 January 1991	Shin Soo-ji
Son Yeon-jae	28 May 1994	Son Yeon-jae
Son Yeon-jae Shin Soo-Ji

Soviet Union
Gymnast	Dates	FIG listing
Galina Beloglazova	10 June 1967	Galina Beloglazova
Irina Deriugina	11 January 1958	Irina Deriugina
Irina Devina	8 May 1959	Irina Devina
Tatiana Druchinina	18 April 1969	Tatiana Druchinina
Irina Gabashvili	15 August 1960	Irina Gabashvili
Elena Karpuchina	21 March 1951	Elena Karpuchina
Oxana Kostina	15 April 1973	Oxana Kostina
Anna Kotchneva	25 January 1970	Anna Kotchneva
Dalia Kutkaitė	11 February 1965	Dalia Kutkaite
Tatiana Kravtchenko	13 June 1936	Tatiana Kravtchenko
Marina Lobatch	26 June 1970	Marina Lobatch
Alfia Nazmutdinova	29 April 1949	Alfia Nazmutdinova
Ludmila Savinkova	1 January 1936	Ludmila Savinkova
Galima Shugurova	8 November 1953	Galima Shugurova
Oxana Skaldina (Note: Oxana Skaldina has represented Ukraine and the USSR)	24 October 1972	Oxana Skaldina
Olexandra Timoshenko (Note: Olexandra Timoshenko has represented Ukraine and the USSR)	18 February 1972	Olexandra Timoshenko
Elena Tomas	11 January 1961	Elena Tomas
c Alexandra Timoshenko Dalia Kutkaitė

Spain
Gymnast	Dates	FIG listing
Carmen Acedo	5 January 1975 (Note: "100 Greatest Rhythmic Gymnast - Carmem Acedo of Spain". Nicole Mezheritsky.)	Carmen Acedo
Sandra Aguilar	9 August 1992	Sandra Aguilar
María Jesús Alegre	17 December 1957	María Jesús Alegre
Alba Baustista	13 July 2002	Alba Bautista
Polina Berezina	5 December 1997	Polina Berezina
Marta Baldó	8 April 1979	Marta Baldó
Begoña Blasco	30 April 1960	Begoña Blasco
Nuria Cabanillas	9 August 1980	Nuria Cabanillas
Almudena Cid	15 June 1980	Almudena Cid
Artemi Gavezou	19 June 1994	Artemi Gavezou
Estela Giménez	29 March 1979	Estela Giménez
Lorena Guréndez	7 May 1981	Lorena Guréndez
Tania Lamarca	30 April 1980	Tania Lamarca
Elena López	4 October 1994	Elena López
Estíbaliz Martínez	9 May 1980	Estíbaliz Martínez
Lourdes Mohedano	17 June 1995	Lourdes Mohedano
Carolina Pascual	17 June 1976	Carolina Pascual
Alejandra Quereda	24 July 1992	Alejandra Quereda
Carolina Rodríguez	24 May 1986	Carolina Rodríguez
Salma Solaun	2 March 2005	Salma Solaun
Carolina Pascual Carolina Rodríguez María Jesús Alegre Polina Berezina

Ukraine
Gymnast	Dates	FIG listing
Anna Bessonova	29 July 1984	Anna Bessonova
Irina Deriugina	11 January 1958	Irina Deriugina
Olena Diachenko	15 June 2001	Olena Diachenko
Olena Dmytrash	1 December 1991	Olena Dmytrash
Natalia Godunko	5 December 1984	Natalia Godunko
Yevgeniya Gomon	25 March 1995	Yevgeniya Gomon
Oleksandra Gridasova	5 July 1995	Oleksandra Gridasova
Polina Karika	25 June 2005	Polina Karika
Kateryna Lutsenko	18 September 1995	Kateryna Lutsenko
Alina Maksimenko	10 July 1991	Alina Maksimenko
Viktoria Mazur	15 October 1994	Viktoria Mazur
Anastasiia Mulmina	27 April 1997	Anastasiia Mulmina
Taisiia Onofriichuk	26 May 2008	Taisiia Onofriichuk
Viktoriia Onopriienko	18 October 2003	Viktoriia Onopriienko
Khrystyna Pohranychna	13 May 2003	Khrystyna Pohranychna
Ludmila Savinkova	1 January 1936	Ludmila Savinkova
Oxana Skaldina	24 October 1972	Oxana Skaldina
Ekaterina Serebrianskaya	25 October 1977	Ekaterina Serebrianskaya
Karina Sydorak	25 June 2005	Karina Sydorak
Olexandra Timoshenko	18 February 1972	Olexandra Timoshenko
Olena Vitrichenko	25 November 1976	Olena Vitrichenko
Ganna Rizatdinova	16 July 1993	Ganna Rizatdinova
Eleonora Romanova	17 August 1998	Eleonora Romanova
Tamara Yerofeeva	4 March 1982	Tamara Yerofeeva
Anna Bessonova Olena Vitrichenko Alina Maksymenko Khrystyna Pohranychna Tamara Yerofeeva Hanna Rizatdinova Viktoria Mazur Taisiia Onofriichuk

United Kingdom
Gymnast	Dates	FIG listing
Marfa Ekimova	17 January 2005	Marfa Ekimova
Laura Halford	25 February 1996	Laura Halford
Francesca Jones	9 November 1990	Francesca Jones
Stephani Sherlock	2 September 1996	Stephani Sherlock
Francesca Jones Marfa Ekimova

United States
Gymnast	Dates	FIG listing
Evita Griskenas	3 December 2000	Evita Griskenas
Jasmine Kerber	12 April 1996	Jasmine Kerber
Mary Sanders	26 August 1985	Mary Sanders
Laura Zeng	14 October 1999	Laura Zeng
Julie Zetlin	30 June 1990	Julie Zetlin
Mary Sanders Julie Zetlin Evita Griskenas

Uzbekistan
Gymnast	Dates	FIG listing
Valeriya Davidova	15 December 1997	Valeriya Davidova
Ekaterina Fetisova	3 January 2003	Ekaterina Fetisova
Takhmina Ikromova	6 August 2004	Takhmina Ikromova
Elizaveta Nazarenkova	17 August 1995	Elizaveta Nazarenkova
Anastasiya Serdyukova	29 May 1997	Anastasiya Serdyukova
Djamila Rakhmatova	19 September 1990	Djamila Rakhmatova
Ulyana Trofimova	28 February 1990	Ulyana Trofimova
Ulyana Trofimova Ekaterina Fetisova Takhmina Ikromova

Yugoslavia
Gymnast	Dates	FIG listing
Milena Reljin	25 May 1967	Milena Reljin

== See also ==
- List of gymnasts
