= Brigita Krašovec =

Slovenian rhythmic gymnast

- Born: 20 January 2004 (age 22) Postojna, Slovenia

Gymnastics career
- Discipline: Rhythmic gymnastics
- Country represented: Slovenia (2018–2025)
- Club: ŠD Moste
- Gym: Gimnastični center Ljubljana
- Head coaches: Ana Kokalj, Tina Čas
- Retired: yes
Medal record
Representing Slovenia
Rhythmic gymnastics
National Championships
| Gold medal – first place | 2025 Ljubljana | All-around |
| Silver medal – second place | 2020 Ljubljana | All-around |
| Silver medal – second place | 2022 Ljubljana | All-around |
| Silver medal – second place | 2023 Ljubljana | All-around |
| Bronze medal – third place | 2021 Ljubljana | All-around |
| Bronze medal – third place | 2024 Ljubljana | All-around |

Brigita Krašovec (born 20 January 2004) is a Slovenian rhythmic gymnast. On the national level, she is the 2025 Slovenian national champion, a three-time (2020, 2022, 2023) Slovenian all-around silver medalist and a two-time (2018, 2019) Slovenian Junior all-around champion.

In addition to gymnastics, Krašovec has participated in competitive dance. She is the 2022 World champion in modern solo dance. She won a silver medal at the 2018 World Show Dance Championships in Prague, Czech Republic, and a silver medal at the 2021 World Modern & Contemporary Championships in Warsaw, Poland.

== Career ==
Krašovec took up rhythmic gymnastics in 2010, following her older sister Barbara into the sport. Her favorite apparatus is the ball.

=== Junior ===
In 2018, Krašovec began competing as a junior. In May, she competed at the International Tournament Guadalajara, where she qualified to two apparatus finals. She won a silver medal behind Lala Kramarenko in the ribbon final and placed 5th in the clubs final. In June, she competed in the Junior European Championships, also held in Guadalajara, where she and her teammate Ivona Vukićević placed 15th in the tam competition together with the Slovenian senior group. Krašovec placed 8th in the all-around with a score of 56.750 and placed 19th in the ball and clubs qualifications, 28th with ribbon and 31st in the hoop qualifications. Shortly after that, she became the 2018 Slovenian Junior all-around champion and also won all four apparatus finals.

In 2019, Krašovec competed in the International Tournament Sofia Cup, where she placed 4th in the all-around and qualified to the rope, ball and clubs finals. In May, she defended her junior national champion titles, winning all five gold medals. Krašovec represented Slovenia at the 2019 Junior World Championships in Moscow, Russia in July. She also competed at the 2019 Mediterranean Junior Championships in Cagliari, Italy, where she won a bronze medal in the ribbon final and finished 6th in the team competition with Ivona Vukićević.

=== Senior ===
In 2021, Krašovec made her World Cup debut in March, in Sofia, Bulgaria, where she placed 51st in the all-around.

In 2023, Krašovec won the silver medal in the all-around at the Slovenian National Championships and three gold and one bronze medal in the apparatus finals. She was selected to represent Slovenia, and mdke her senior European Championships debut at the 2023 European Championships in Baku, Azerbaijan, together with teammates Ekaterina Vedeneeva and Ela Polak. Krašovec placed 25th in the ball qualifications and 21st in the clubs qualifications. In August, she made her debut at the World Championship in the senior category in Valencia, Spain, as part of a team with Ekaterina Vedeneeva and Ela Polak. She placed 33rd in the ball qualifications and 31st in Ccubs.

In 2024, Krašovec competed at the Baku World Cup, where she took 28th place in the all-around. She won the bronze medal in the all-around at Slovenian National Championships and four gold medals in the apparatus finals, making it her most successful senior Nationals. She took 23rd place in the all-around at the World Challenge Cup Portimao, with her best apparatus result being 15th place with the hoop.

In 2025, Krašovec started her season at the International Tournament Sofia Cup, where she ended in 6th place in the all-around and qualified to three apparatus finals. On 25-27 April, she competed at the World Cup Tashkent, where she took 38th place in the all-around. On 16 May, she won her first senior Slovenian national all-around title. She also won gold medals in all apparatus finals but ball, where she won bronze. Krašovec was selected to represent Slovenia at the 2025 European Championships in Tallinn, Estonia, together with teammates Ela Polak and Dora Valant. She took 36th place in all-around qualifications and failed to qualify to all-around final due to mistakes in her ribbon routine. Her best placement was with ball - 22nd place. She won the Shooting Star award, being recognised as an inspiration for the future generation of gymnasts and the general public alike.

Krašovec qualified for the 2025 World Championships, but she declined her spot, which was later given to Alja Ponikvar. On July 24, she announced via her Instagram profile that she was taking a break from the sport.

== Awards ==
- Elle Style Award for Young Talent (2024)
- Shooting Star award (2025)

== Routine music information ==
| Year | Apparatus | Music title |
|---|---|---|
| 2025 | Hoop | Darkwood, Fear by FreshmanSound |
| 2025 | Ball | Mascaron by Lissom, Julien Marchal & Lowsimmer |
| 2025 | Clubs | The Diner by Billie Eilish, Breakin' Dishes by Rihanna |
| 2025 | Ribbon | Gangnam Style by Psy, Sexy and I Know It, Party Rock Anthem by LMFAO, Na Golici by Gorenjski kvartet |
| 2024 | Hoop | Darkwood, Fear by FreshmanSound |
| 2024 | Ball | Corps by Yseult |
| 2024 | Clubs | A Good Song Never Dies by Saint Motel |
| 2024 | Ribbon | Dead! by My Chemical Romance |
| 2023 | Hoop | Je te laisserai des mots by Patrick Watson |
| 2023 | Ball | No Time to Die by Billie Eilish |
| 2023 | Clubs | A Good Song Never Dies by Saint Motel |
| 2023 | Ribbon | Carmen: L'amour est un oiseau rebelle by Angela Gheorghiu |
| 2020 | Hoop | unknown |
| 2020 | Ball | No Time to Die by Billie Eilish |
| 2020 | Clubs | You Should See Me in a Crown by Billie Eilish |
| 2020 | Ribbon | Energy drink by WaveToys, Arrival to Earth by Steve Jablonsky |
| 2019 | Rope | Ghost Of Sky by Steed Lord |
| 2019 | Ball | Gematria by Kokia |
| 2019 | Clubs | unknown |
| 2019 | Ribbon | Energy drink by WaveToys, Arrival to Earth by Steve Jablonsky |
| 2018 | Hoop | Iron by Woodkid |
| 2018 | Ball | Gematria by Kokia |
| 2018 | Clubs | Circle of Life by Carmen Twillie |
| 2018 | Ribbon | Bohemian Rhapsody by Queen (band) |

== Competitive highlights ==
International: Senior
| Year | Event | AA | Team | Hoop | Ball | Clubs | Ribbon |
|---|---|---|---|---|---|---|---|
| 2025 | European Championships | 36th (Q) | | 24th (Q) | 22nd (Q) | | 53rd (Q) |
| 2025 | World Cup Tashkent | 38th | | 26th (Q) | 30th (Q) | 46th (Q) | 29th (Q) |
| 2025 | IT Sofia Cup | 6th | | 6th | 33rd (Q) | 8th | 6th |
| 2024 | World Challenge Cup Portimao | 23rd | | 15th (Q) | 24th (Q) | 31st (Q) | 22nd (Q) |
| 2024 | World Cup Baku | 28th | | 38th (Q) | 24th (Q) | 19th (Q) | 35th (Q) |
| 2024 | IT Sofia Cup | 25th | | 32nd (Q) | 20th (Q) | 46th (Q) | 49th (Q) |
| 2023 | World Championships | | | | 33rd (Q) | 31st (Q) | |
| 2023 | Summer Universiade | 13th | | 9th (Q) | 11th (Q) | 15th (Q) | 18th (Q) |
| 2023 | World Cup Milan | 48th | | 45th (Q) | 28th (Q) | 41st (Q) | 56th (Q) |
| 2023 | European Championships | | | | 25th (Q) | 21st (Q) | |
| 2023 | World Cup Baku | 45th | | 47th (Q) | 36th (Q) | 50th (Q) | 41st (Q) |
| 2023 | World Challenge Cup Athens | 41st | | | | | |
| 2022 | World Challenge Cup Pamplona | 25th | | 22nd (Q) | 21st (Q) | 32nd (Q) | 23rd (Q) |
| 2021 | Aura Cup Zagreb | 11th | | 12th (Q) | 13th (Q) | 10th (Q) | 9th (Q) |
| 2021 | World Cup Sofia | 51st | | 55th (Q) | 48th (Q) | 48th (Q) | 54th (Q) |
International: Junior
| Year | Event | AA | Team | Rope | Ball | Clubs | Ribbon |
| 2019 | Mediterranean Junior Championships | | | 6th | | 4th | 3rd |
| 2019 | Junior World Championships | | | 30th (Q) | 19th (Q) | 31st (Q) | 25th (Q) |
| 2019 | International Tournament Sofia Cup | 4th | 9th | 8th | 4th | 7th | 18th (Q) |
| 2019 | Aura Cup Zagreb | 6th | | | 9th (Q) | 2nd | 2nd |
| 2019 | Dream TiM Cup | 2nd | | | 2nd | 2nd | |
| Year | Event | AA | Team | Hoop | Ball | Clubs | Ribbon |
| 2018 | European Junior Championships | | 15th | 31st (Q) | 19th (Q) | 19th (Q) | 28th (Q) |
| 2018 | International Tournament Guadalajara | | 9th | 7th | | 5th | 2nd |
| 2018 | International Tournament AGF Trophy | | | 18th (Q) | 8th | 7th | 20th (Q) |
| 2018 | Aura Cup Zagreb | 8th | | 3rd | 22nd (Q) | 1st | 9th |
| 2018 | Dream TiM Cup | | | 2nd | | 2nd | 6th |
National: Senior
| Year | Event | AA | Team | Hoop | Ball | Clubs | Ribbon |
| 2025 | Slovenian Championships | 1st | | 1st | 3rd | 1st | 1st |
| 2024 | Slovenian Championships | 3rd | | 1st | 1st | 1st | 1st |
| 2023 | Slovenian Championships | 2nd | | 1st | 1st | 1st | 3rd |
| 2022 | Slovenian Championships | 2nd | | | 1st | 3rd | 2nd |
| 2021 | Slovenian Championships | 3rd | | 2nd | 3rd | 3rd | 3rd |
| 2020 | Slovenian Championships | 2nd | | 5th | 2nd | 2nd | 4th |
National: Junior
| Year | Event | AA | Team | Rope | Ball | Clubs | Ribbon |
| 2019 | Slovenian Junior Championships | 1st | | 1st | 1st | 1st | 1st |
| Year | Event | AA | Team | Hoop | Ball | Clubs | Ribbon |
| 2018 | Slovenian Junior Championships | 1st | 2nd | 1st | 1st | 1st | 1st |
Q = Qualifications (did not advance to event final due to the 2 gymnasts per country rule, only top 8 highest score); WR = World Record; WD = Withdrew; NT = No team competition; OC = Out of competition (competed but scores not counted for qualifications/results)
