= Iza Zorec =

Slovenian rhythmic gymnast

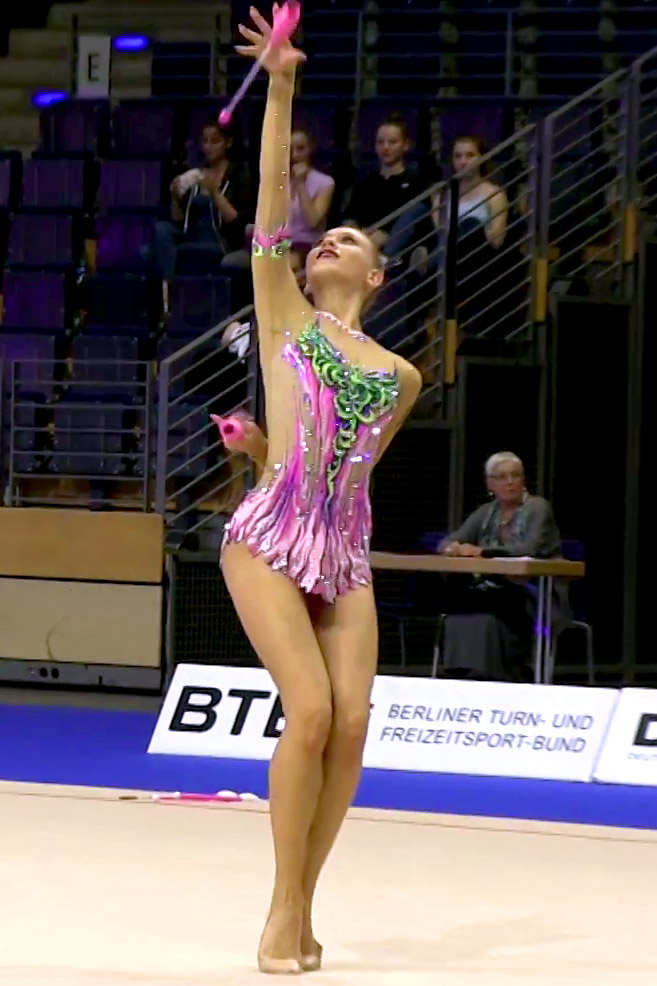
- Zorec in 2017

Personal information
- Full name: Iza Zorec
- Born: 22 March 2000 (age 26) Ljubljana, Slovenia

Gymnastics career
- Discipline: Rhythmic gymnastics
- Country represented: Slovenia (2016–2019)
- Club: ŠD Moste
- Head coach: Tina Čas
- Assistant coach: Ana Kokalj
Medal record
Representing Slovenia
Rhythmic Gymnastics
National Championships
Silver medal – second place	2018 Ljubljana	All-Around
Bronze medal – third place	2016 Ljubljana	All-Around
Bronze medal – third place	2017 Ljubljana	All-Around
Bronze medal – third place	2019 Ljubljana	All-Around

Iza Zorec (born 22 March 2000) is a Slovenian rhythmic gymnast. On national level, she is the 2018 National All-around silver medalist and a three-time (2016, 2017, 2019) National All-around bronze medalist.

== Career ==
=== Junior ===
Zorec and her teammates Aleksandra Podgoršek, Aja Jerman and Taja Karner competed at the 2014 Junior European Championships in Baku, Azerbaijan where they finished on 23rd place in Team competition.

=== Senior ===
She represented her country at the 2019 World Championships in Baku, Azerbaijan, where she placed 22nd in Team competition together with Ekaterina Vedeneeva, Aleksandra Podgoršek and Aja Jerman. She placed 115th in Clubs and 86th in Ribbon Qualifications. She also competed at the 2017 European Championships and placed 21st in Team competition together with Anja Tomazin, Aja Jerman and Junior group.

== Routine music information ==
Year	Apparatus	Music title
2018	Hoop	Black Skinhead (Instrumental) by Kanye West
2018	Ball	Nessun dorma by Luciano Pavarotti
2018	Clubs	unknown
2018	Ribbon	Od višine se zvrti by Martin Krpan
2017	Hoop	Black Skinhead (Instrumental) by Kanye West
2017	Ball	Nessun dorma by Luciano Pavarotti
2017	Clubs	Hit the Road Jack by Hermes House Band
2017	Ribbon	Minnie The Moocher by Big Bad Voodoo Daddy
