= Slovenian Rhythmic Gymnastics Championships =

The Slovenian Rhythmic Gymnastics National Championship is an annual rhythmic gymnastics national competition in Slovenia.

== Slovenian Championships Medalists ==
All-around medalists
Year	Location	Gold	Silver	Bronze	Club	Ref.
2001	Ljubljana	Dušica Jeremič	Mojca Rode	Tina Čas		
2003	Ljubljana	Mojca Rode				
2004	Ljubljana	Mojca Rode				
2006	Ljubljana	Mojca Rode	Tjaša Šeme	Pia Arhar	KRG Narodni dom	
2007	Ljubljana	Mojca Rode	Tjaša Šeme	Pia Arhar	ŠD Moste	
2008	Ljubljana	Mojca Rode	Tjaša Šeme	Evita Pšeničny	KRG Narodni dom	
2009	Ljubljana	Mojca Rode	Tjaša Šeme	Pia Arhar	ŠD Moste	
2010	Maribor	Tjaša Šeme	Evita Pšeničny	Pia Arhar	DŠRG Branik Maribor	
2011	Ljubljana	Tjaša Šeme	Evita Pšeničny	Pia Arhar	KRG Narodni dom	
2012	Ljubljana	Tjaša Šeme	Sara Kragulj	Emina Haračič	ŠD Moste	
2013	Ljubljana	Saša Bilić and Monija Cebasek	—N/a	Pia Arhar	KRG Narodni dom	
2014	Ljubljana	Špela Kratochwill	Monija Cebasek	Sara Kragulj	KRG Narodni dom	
2015	Ljubljana	Špela Kratochwill	Sara Kragulj	Monija Cebasek	KRG Narodni dom	
2016	Ljubljana	Špela Kratochwill	Aja Jerman	Iza Zorec	KRG Narodni dom	
2017	Ljubljana	Aleksandra Podgoršek	Aja Jerman	Iza Zorec	KRG Narodni dom	
2018	Ljubljana	Aleksandra Podgoršek	Iza Zorec	Anja Tomazin	ŠD Moste	
2019	Ljubljana	Ekaterina Vedeneeva	Aleksandra Podgoršek	Iza Zorec	KRG Šiška	
2020	Ljubljana	Aleksandra Podgoršek	Brigita Krašovec	Nastja Podvratnik	KRG Narodni dom	
2021	Ljubljana	Ekaterina Vedeneeva	Aleksandra Podgoršek	Brigita Krašovec	KRG Šiška	
2022	Ljubljana	Ekaterina Vedeneeva	Brigita Krašovec	Tina Hajdinjak	KRG Narodni dom	
2023	Ljubljana	Ela Polak	Brigita Krašovec	Nika Zajc	KRG Šiška	
2024	Ljubljana	Ekaterina Vedeneeva	Ela Polak	Brigita Krašovec	KRG Šiška	
2025	Ljubljana	Brigita Krašovec	Ela Polak	Dora Valant	KRG Narodni dom	
2026	Ljubljana	Alja Ponikvar	Dora Valant	Urša Kračman	KRG Narodni dom	

== Apparatus Finals ==
Year	Gold	Silver	Bronze
Rope Final
2006	Mojca Rode	Tjaša Šeme	Pia Arhar
2007	Mojca Rode	Tjaša Šeme	Pia Arhar

Year	Gold	Silver	Bronze
Hoop Final
2007	Mojca Rode	Tjaša Šeme	Lara Flegar
2012	Tjaša Šeme	Pia Arhar	Sara Kragulj
2013	Saša Bilić	Pia Arhar	Gruša Kočica
2014	Špela Kratochwill	Monija Cebasek	Sara Kragulj
2015	Špela Kratochwill	Sara Kragulj	Monija Cebasek
2016	Špela Kratochwill	Iza Zorec	Anja Tomazin
2017	Aja Jerman	Aleksandra Podgoršek	Anja Tomazin
2018	Iza Zorec	Aja Jerman	Anja Tomazin
2019	Aleksandra Podgoršek	Aja Jerman	Ela Lipicer
2020	Aleksandra Podgoršek	Ela Lipicer	Tina Hajdinjak
2021	Aleksandra Podgoršek	Brigita Krašovec	Neža Podvratnik
2022	Tina Hajdinjak	Katarina Muraus	Tiana Aksentijević
2023	Brigita Krašovec	Ela Polak	Nika Zajc
2024	Brigita Krašovec	Ela Polak	Nika Zajc
2025	Brigita Krašovec	Ela Polak	Dora Valant
2026	Alja Ponikvar	Dora Valant	Urša Kračman

Year	Gold	Silver	Bronze
Ball Final
2006	Tjaša Šeme	Mojca Rode	Pia Arhar
2012	Tjaša Šeme	Pia Arhar	Sara Kragulj
2013	Monija Čebašek	Saša Bilić	Pia Arhar
2014	Špela Kratochwill	Sara Kragulj	Monija Cebasek
2015	Špela Kratochwill	Sara Kragulj	Monija Cebasek
2016	Špela Kratochwill	Aja Jerman	Iza Zorec
2017	Aleksandra Podgoršek	Iza Zorec	Monija Cebasek
2018	Aja Jerman	Iza Zorec	Anja Tomazin
2019	Aleksandra Podgoršek	Aja Jerman	Iza Zorec
2020	Aleksandra Podgoršek	Brigita Krašovec	Tina Hajdinjak
2021	Aleksandra Podgoršek	Tina Hajdinjak	Brigita Krašovec
2022	Brigita Krašovec	Tina Hajdinjak	Nastja Podvratnik
2023	Brigita Krašovec	Nika Zajc	Ela Polak
2024	Brigita Krašovec	Ela Polak	Nika Zajc
2025	Ela Polak	Dora Valant	Brigita Krašovec
2026	Dora Valant	Alja Ponikvar	Paula Loboda

Year	Gold	Silver	Bronze
Clubs Final
2006	Mojca Rode	Tjaša Šeme	Pia Arhar
2007	Tjaša Šeme	Mojca Rode	Mojca Justin
2012	Tjaša Šeme	Sara Kragulj	Ana Gomzi
2013	Saša Bilić	Monija Čebašek	Gruša Kočica
2014	Špela Kratochwill	Sara Kragulj	Monija Cebasek
2015	Špela Kratochwill	Aja Jerman	Sara Kragulj
2016	Špela Kratochwill	Aja Jerman	Iza Zorec
2017	Aleksandra Podgoršek	Aja Jerman	Iza Zorec
2018	Anja Tomazin	Iza Zorec	Aja Jerman
2019	Aleksandra Podgoršek	Iza Zorec	Aja Jerman
2020	Aleksandra Podgoršek	Brigita Krašovec	Nastja Podvratnik
2021	Aleksandra Podgoršek	Tina Hajdinjak	Brigita Krašovec
2022	Karina Gerkman Salauyova	Tiana Aksentijević	Brigita Krašovec
2023	Brigita Krašovec	Ela Polak	Nika Zajc
2024	Brigita Krašovec	Ela Polak	Nika Zajc
2025	Brigita Krašovec	Ela Polak	Dora Valant
2026	Alja Ponikvar	Dora Valant	Paula Loboda

Year	Gold	Silver	Bronze
Ribbon Final
2006	Mojca Rode	Tjaša Šeme	Pia Arhar
2007	Mojca Rode	Tjaša Šeme	Pia Arhar
2012	Tjaša Šeme	Sara Kragulj	Emina Haračič
2013	Saša Bilić	Monija Čebašek	Pia Arhar
2014	Špela Kratochwill	Monija Cebasek	Karmen Petan
2015	Špela Kratochwill	Sara Kragulj	Monija Cebasek
2016	Špela Kratochwill	Aja Jerman	Iza Zorec
2017	Aleksandra Podgoršek	Aja Jerman	Iza Zorec
2018	Anja Tomazin	Iza Zorec	Aja Jerman
2019	Aleksandra Podgoršek	Aja Jerman	Iza Zorec
2020	Aleksandra Podgoršek	Nastja Podvratnik	Lara Nemeš
2021	Aleksandra Podgoršek	Neža Podvratnik	Brigita Krašovec
2022	Karina Gerkman Salauyova	Brigita Krašovec	Tiana Aksentijević
2023	Ela Polak	Nika Zajc	Brigita Krašovec
2024	Brigita Krašovec	Ela Polak	Nika Zajc
2025	Brigita Krašovec	Dora Valant	Ela Polak
2026	Alja Ponikvar	Dora Valant	Urša Kračman

== Medal table ==
Rank	Gymnast	Gold	Silver	Bronze	Total
1	Aleksandra Podgoršek	18	3	0	21
2	Špela Kratochwill	15	0	0	15
3	Brigita Krašovec	12	7	8	27
4	Mojca Rode	12	3	0	15
5	Tjaša Šeme	9	10	0	19
6	Saša Bilić	4	1	0	5
7	Ekaterina Vedeneeva	4	0	0	4
8	Ela Polak	3	10	2	15
9	Aja Jerman	2	12	3	17
10	Monija Čebašek	2	5	7	14
11	Anja Tomazin	2	0	5	7
12	Karina Gerkman Salauyova	2	0	0	2
13	Iza Zorec	1	7	10	18
14	Dora Valant	1	6	3	10
15	Tina Hajdinjak	1	3	3	7
16	Sara Kragulj	0	9	5	14
17	Pia Arhar	0	3	11	14
18	Nika Zajc	0	2	7	9
19	Nastja Podvratnik	0	1	3	4
20	Tiana Aksentijević	0	1	2	3
21	Ela Lipicer	0	1	1	2
21	Neža Podvratnik	0	1	1	2
23	Katarina Muraus	0	1	0	1
24	Emina Haračič	0	0	2	2
24	Gruša Kočica	0	0	2	2
26	Karmen Petan	0	0	1	1
26	Lara Nemeš	0	0	1	1
Totals (27 entries)		88	86	77	251

== Junior Medalists ==
All-around medalists
Year	Location	Gold	Silver	Bronze
2015	Ljubljana	Aleksandra Podgoršek	Iza Zorec	Anja Tomazin
2016	Ljubljana	Aleksandra Podgoršek	Ana Kragulj	Lara Pikovnik
2017	Ljubljana	Lara Pikovnik	Tessa Prihoda	Anja Mavrič
2018	Ljubljana	Brigita Krašovec	Ivona Vukićević	Anja Mavrič
2019	Ljubljana	Brigita Krašovec	Neža Podvratnik	Ana Barba
2020	Ljubljana	Neža Podvratnik	Karina Gerkman Salauyova	Tiana Aksentijević
2021	Ljubljana	Ela Polak	Karina Gerkman Salauyova	Nika Zajc
2022	Ljubljana	Ela Polak	Nika Zajc	Asja Pučnik
2023	Ljubljana	Alja Ponikvar	Luna Gregorič	Dora Valant
2024	Ljubljana	Alja Ponikvar	Urša Kračman	Paula Loboda
2025	Ljubljana	Urša Kračman	Una Mijić	Paula Loboda
2026	Ljubljana	Una Mijić	Pia Permozer Furlan	Ida Finšgar
