= Ela Polak =

Slovenian rhythmic gymnast

- Full name: Ela Polak
- Born: 27 November 2007 (age 18) Ljubljana, Slovenia

Gymnastics career
- Discipline: Rhythmic gymnastics
- Country represented: Slovenia; (2020–present)
- Club: KRG Šiška
- Head coach: Viktorija Rus
Medal record
Representing Slovenia
Rhythmic gymnastics
National Championships
Gold medal – first place	2023 Ljubljana	All-Around
Silver medal – second place	2024 Ljubljana	All-Around
Silver medal – second place	2025 Ljubljana	All-Around

Ela Polak (born 27 November 2007) is a Slovenian rhythmic gymnast. She is the 2023 Slovenian All-Around champion and a two-time (2021, 2022) Slovenian Junior All-Around champion.

== Career ==
=== Junior ===
In 2020, she became National All-around champion in pre-junior category and earned a spot in junior national team. On November 26–29, she competed at the 2020 Junior European Championships, where she took 28th place in Rope, 21st place in Ball and 27th place in Clubs.

She competed at the 2022 Junior European Championships and placed 17th in Team competition (out of 33 countries) together with teammates Alja Ponikvar, Asja Pučnik and Nika Zajc. Competing with Ball, she took 15th place in Qualifications, as the most successful Slovenian junior.

=== Senior ===
She debuted in senior category in 2023. In the end of March, she competed at her first ever World Cup, at World Cup Sofia, in Bulgaria, where she ended on 38th place (100.950). In April, she won gold medal in All-around at Slovenian National Championships, another gold in Ribbon final, two silver in Hoop and Clubs final and bronze in Ball final.

She was selected to represent Slovenia at the 2023 European Championships in Baku, Azerbaijan, together with teammates Ekaterina Vedeneeva and Brigita Krašovec, where she made her debut at European Championships in senior category. She placed 34th in Hoop Qualifications and 23rd in Ribbon Qualifications. In August, she made her debut at the World Championship in the senior category, held in Valencia, Spain, as part of a team with Ekaterina Vedeneeva and Brigita Krašovec. She placed 55th in Hoop qualifications and 45th in Ribbon.

In 2024, she won silver medal in All-around at the Slovenian National Championships behind Ekaterina Vedeneeva. She competed at the 2024 European Championships in Budapest, Hungary with two apparatus only. She ended on 32nd place with Ball and on 66th with Clubs.

In 2025, she started her competition season at Sofia World Cup and finished on 44th place in All-around. She won gold medal in All-around at MTM Ljubljana Tournament in April. In finals, she won gold medal in ribbon and silver medals in other three appratus. On April 18-20, she competed at the Baku World Cup and took 32nd place in all-around. On 16 May, she won silver medal in All-around at the Slovenian National Championships behind Brigita Krašovec.

== Routine music information ==
Year	Apparatus	Music title
2026	Hoop	Forest Dance by Filip Lackovic
2026	Ball	Fresh Air, On the Lam by Jeremy Zuckerman
2026	Clubs	
2026	Ribbon	
2025	Hoop	Forest Dance by Filip Lackovic
2025	Ball	Orion Lady by Siddharta
2025	Clubs	Right Round, Low by Flo Rida
2025	Ribbon	Lord Shen Theme, Kai's Theme & Agni Kai by Samuel Kim (from Kung fu Panda: Epic collection)
2024	Hoop	unknown
2024	Ball	Tout l'univers by Gjon's Tears
2024	Clubs	Right Round, Low by Flo Rida
2024	Ribbon	
2023	Hoop	unknown
2023	Ball	Tout l'univers by Gjon's Tears
2023	Clubs	Dark Side by Blind Channel
2023	Ribbon	Bang! by AJR and 3 to Tango by Pitbull
2022	Hoop	
2022	Ball	
2022	Clubs	Dark Side by Blind Channel
2022	Ribbon	The End (The party is over) by Destination
