= Nika Zajc =

Swiss rhythmic gymnast

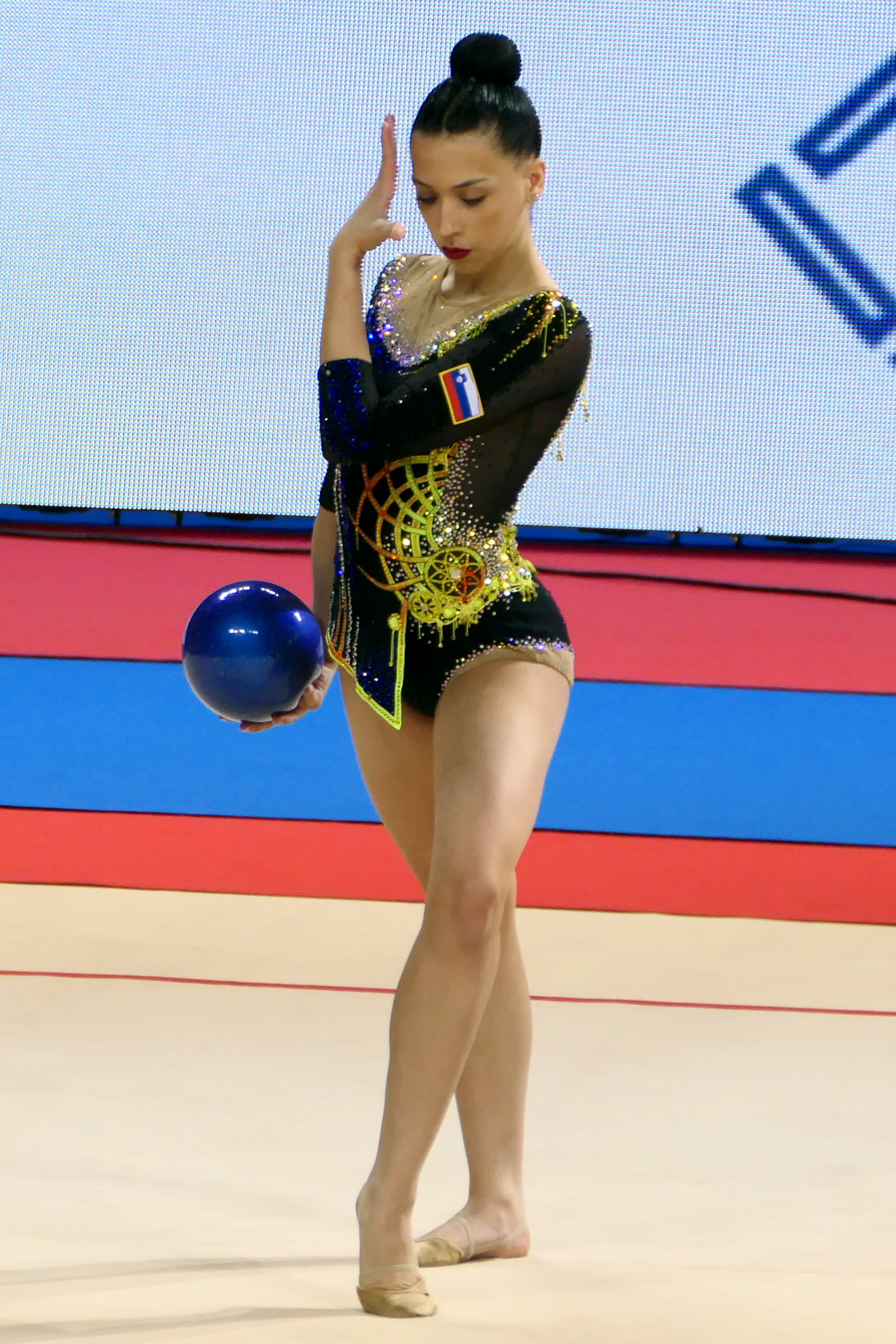
- Zajc in 2024

Personal information
- Full name: Nika Zajc
- Born: 10 September 2007 (age 18)

Gymnastics career
- Discipline: Rhythmic gymnastics
- Country represented: Switzerland (2022–present)
- Former countries represented: Slovenia
- Club: KRG Narodni dom, FSG Lucens
- Head coach: Alena Yakubouskaya
- Assistant coach: Alicia Marmonier
Medal record
Representing Slovenia
Rhythmic gymnastics
National Championships
Bronze medal – third place	2023 Ljubljana	All-Around

Nika Zajc (born 10 September 2007) is a Slovenian-born Swiss rhythmic gymnast who formerly represented Slovenia. She is the 2023 Slovenian all-around bronze medalist.

== Career ==
In 2018, her family moved from Slovenia to Switzerland because of her father's job, and she started training at FSG Lucens.

=== Junior ===
In 2022, she won silver medal in all-around at Slovenian National Championships. She competed at the 2022 Junior European Championships and placed 17th in the team competition out of 33 countries, together with her teammates Alja Ponikvar, Asja Pučnik and Ela Polak. She competed with ribbon and took 17th place in qualifications.

=== Senior ===
In 2023, she won the silver medal in the all-around at the Swiss Championships and bronze in the all-around at the Slovenian Championships.

In 2024, she was again part of Slovenian national team. She made her debut on the World Cup circuit at the at Palaio Faliro World Cup. Zajc also competed at the Sofia World Cup, where she finished in 37th place in the all-around. She took 4th place in the all-around at the Slovenian Championships and won four bronze medals in all four apparatus finals. At the 2024 European Championships in Budapest, Hungary, she competed with two apparatuses only. She ended in 40th place with hoop and 47th with ribbon. At the end of May, she won a bronze medal in the all-around at the Swiss Championships.

In October, she began representing Switzerland instead of Slovenia.

== Routine music information ==
Year	Apparatus	Music title
2024	Hoop	Dethrone the King by X-Ray Dog
2024	Ball	
2024	Clubs	We Are Justice by Gabriel Saban
2024	Ribbon	Lightbringer from The Mageseeker: A League of Legends Story by 2WEI and Ali Christenhusz
