= Špela Kratochwill =

Slovenian rhythmic gymnast

- Full name: Špela Kratochwill
- Born: 27 January 1998 (age 28) Ljubljana, Slovenia

Gymnastics career
- Discipline: Rhythmic gymnastics
- Country represented: Slovenia; (2012–2016)
- Club: Narodni dom
- Gym: Dvorana Krim
- Head coach: Alena Yakubouskaya
- Assistant coach: Alena Salauyova
- Retired: yes
Medal record
Representing Slovenia
Rhythmic gymnastics
National Championships
Gold medal – first place	2014 Ljubljana	All-Around
Gold medal – first place	2015 Ljubljana	All-Around
Gold medal – first place	2016 Ljubljana	All-Around

Špela Kratochwill (born 27 January 1998) is a Slovenian rhythmic gymnast. She is the three-time (2014, 2015, 2016) Slovenian National All-Around champion and three-time Slovenian Junior National All-Around champion.

== Career ==
=== Junior ===
Špela was selected to represent Slovenia together with Karmen Petan at the 2012 Junior European Championships in Nizhny Novgorod and placed 14th in Team competition. She competed with Hoop (24.150) and Ribbon (23.725).

=== Senior ===
She competed at 2015 European Championships where she placed 33rd with Hoop (15.500), 44th with Ball (14.966), 34th with Clubs (15.600) and 36th with Ribbon (14.983). Together with teammembers (Sara Kragulj and Monija Čebašek she placed 19th in Team competition. She competed at 2015 World Championships where she ended on 50th place All-Around, 48th with Hoop (15.566), 47th with Ball (15.350), 50th with Clubs (15.850) and 100th with Ribbon (13.616).

She competed at the 2016 Rio Olympics Test Event after 7 months recovering from injury and finished 24th in All-Around qualifications. At the 2016 World Cup Minsk she ended on 22nd place All-Around with score of 62.750. She did a great comeback at next competition, World Cup in Berlin, where she scored 21st in All-Around and get her highest score of 16.450 for Ball routine.

== Routine music information ==
Year	Apparatus	Music title
2016	Hoop	
2016	Ball	Satellite by Lena
2016	Clubs	19 No. 03 Veris Leta Facies (Soprano 2) by Transform Studios
2016	Ribbon	Nazende by Bilen Yıldırır
2015	Hoop	
2015	Ball	Satellite by Lena
2015	Clubs	19 No. 03 Veris Leta Facies (Soprano 2) by Transform Studios
2015	Ribbon	Malagueña by Connie Francis
2014	Hoop	
2014	Ball	Celem, Celem by Yıldız İbrahimova
2014	Clubs	
2014	Ribbon	Malagueña by Connie Francis
2014	Gala	Non, je ne regrette rien by Édith Piaf
