= Aleksandra Podgoršek =

Slovenian rhythmic gymnast

- Full name: Aleksandra Podgoršek
- Nickname: Ale
- Born: 22 July 2001 (age 25) Ljubljana, Slovenia

Gymnastics career
- Discipline: Rhythmic gymnastics
- Country represented: Slovenia; (2014–2021)
- Club: Narodni dom
- Gym: Gimnastični center Ljubljana
- Head coach: Alena Yakubouskaya
- Assistant coach: Alena Salauyova
- Retired: yes
Medal record
Representing Slovenia
Rhythmic gymnastics
National Championships
Gold medal – first place	2020 Ljubljana	All-Around
Gold medal – first place	2018 Ljubljana	All-Around
Gold medal – first place	2017 Ljubljana	All-Around
Silver medal – second place	2021 Ljubljana	All-Around
Silver medal – second place	2019 Ljubljana	All-Around

Aleksandra Podgoršek (born 22 July 2001) is a Slovenian rhythmic gymnast.

She is a three-time (2017, 2018, 2020) Slovenian National All-Around champion and a two-time (2015, 2016) Slovenian Junior National All-Around champion.

== Career ==
=== Junior ===
She started training rhythmic gymnastics in 2007 at the age of 6. She made her debut in National team in 2014. Podgoršek won silver medal in All-Around at the 2014 Slovenian Junior National Championships. She then competed at the 2014 Junior European Championships in Baku, Azerbaijan. She placed 23rd in Team competition together with teammates Aja Jerman, Taja Karner and Iza Zorec.

She became Slovenian Junior National All-around champion in 2015 and again in 2016. She was selected to represent her country at the 2016 Junior European Championships in Holon, Israel together with teammates Ana Kragulj and Lara Pikovnik. She performed with all four apparatuses and got her best placement with Rope - 37th place and score 14.533. She and her teammates placed 28th in Team competition. After this, she suffered an elbow injury and had the operation to Munich in Germany. She was living in Udine, Italy in autumn later this year and spend time training with Alexandra Agiurgiuculese in ASU Udinese.

=== Senior ===
Because of the injury, her first competition in 2017 was 1st Championship competition on national level, but she competed with only two apparatuses - Hoop and Ball. She made her senior debut at the 30th MTM Ljubljana FIG Tournament, where she placed 7th in All-around and qualified to three finals - with Ball, Clubs and Ribbon. Podgoršek competed at her first ever World Cup in April 2017, at World Cup Baku. She placed 29th in All-Around with the score of 54.400. Her next competition was World Cup Guadalajara where she finished on 28th place in All-Around. On June 24–25, Aleksandra became the All-Around champion at the 2017 Slovenian National Championships ahead of Aja Jerman. She swept three golds in Apparatus finals and won silver in Hoop final. On August 6–7, Aleksandra then competed at the World Cup Minsk where she placed 21st in All-Around with a total of 55.300 points and 15th place with Ball. Her next event was on August 11–12 at the World Cup Kazan where she ended on 41st place with a total score of 48.000. At the 2017 World Championships held on August 30 - September 3 in Pesaro, Italy, she placed on 44th place in All-Around Qualifications and did not advance to All-Around Final.

In 2018, Aleksandra's season began in competition at the 2018 Grand Prix Kiev where she placed 21st in All-Around with a total of 52.950 points. Then she competed at the World Cup Sofia and placed 16th in All-Around, which was her best World Cup placement so far. She earned 55.750 points. She was even more successful at the World Cup Tashkent where she placed 11th in All-Around beating her record with total of 62.550 points. She qualified with Ribbon to her first ever World Cup final and finished on 6th place. On May 4–6, she competed at the World Cup Guadalajara and ended on 19th place in All-Around with a score of 56.600. Her next competition was World Cup Portimão where she ended on 14th place in All-Around and on 9th place with both Hoop and Ball. On June 16–17, she became the All-Around champion at the 2018 Slovenian National Championships for the second year in a row. She did not compete in Apparatus Finals because of the injury. Her next competition was at the 2018 Mediterranean Games in Tarragona, Spain. She placed 7th in All Around Qualification and advanced to All-Around Final where she ended on 8th place with a total of 55.300 points.

In 2019, she competed at the 2019 World Championships in Baku, Azerbaijan where she placed 22nd in Team competition together with teammates Iza Zorec, Aja Jerman and Ekaterina Vedeneeva. She contributed to their final result 17.550 score for ball routine and 15.000 for ribbon routine.

In 2021, she announced her retirement.

== Routine music information ==
Year	Apparatus	Music title
2020	Hoop	Fur Elise by Beethoven (Remix)
2020	Ball	Fall in Line by Christina Aguilera, Demi Lovato
2020	Clubs	Highway To Hell by Jonathan Groff, Glee Cast
2020	Ribbon	Halo Theme Song by William Joseph, Lindsey Stirling
2019	Hoop	Ghost Of Sky by Steed Lord
2019	Ball	Fall in Line by Christina Aguilera, Demi Lovato
2019	Clubs	I Love Rock 'n'Roll by Joan Jett & The Blackhearts
2019	Ribbon	Halo Theme Song by William Joseph, Lindsey Stirling
2018	Hoop	Ghost Of Sky by Steed Lord
2018	Ball	Sere Nere by Tiziano Ferro
2018	Clubs	I Love Rock 'n'Roll by Joan Jett & The Blackhearts
2018	Ribbon	токката и фуга ре минор by Bel Suono
2017	Hoop	Hero In Our Midst by Epic Score
2017	Ball	Ti si mi u krvi by Zdravko Čolić
2017	Clubs	Andiamo a comandare by Fabio Rovazzi
2017	Ribbon	токката и фуга ре минор by Bel Suono
2016	Rope	Dibidy Dap by Club des Belugas
2016	Hoop	Summer by David Garrett
2016	Ball	Summertime by Funky Boogie Brothers
2016	Clubs	
2016	Gala	Mascara by Violet

== Personal life ==
In 2021, she took part in Slovenian reality show Exatlon.
