= Alja Ponikvar =

Slovenian rhythmic gymnast

- Full name: Alja Ponikvar
- Born: 17 February 2009 (age 17) Ljubljana, Slovenia

Gymnastics career
- Discipline: Rhythmic gymnastics
- Country represented: Slovenia; (2022-)
- Club: Narodni dom
- Gym: Gimnastični center Ljubljana
- Head coach: Alena Yakubouskaya
- Assistant coach: Alena Salauyova
Medal record
Representing Slovenia
Junior European Championships
Silver medal – second place	2024 Budapest	Clubs

Alja Ponikvar (born 17 February 2009) is a Slovenian rhythmic gymnast. She is the 2024 European Junior clubs silver medalist.

On national level, she is the 2026 Slovenian all-around and a two-time (2023, 2024) Slovenian Junior all-around champion.

== Career ==
As pre-junior, she is the 2022 Slovenian All-Around champion and the 2021 Slovenian All-Around silver medalist.

=== Junior ===
As the youngest member of the team (still a pre-junior) she competed at the 2022 Junior European Championships and placed 17th in Team competition (out of 33 countries) together with teammates Ela Polak, Asja Pučnik and Nika Zajc.

After winning gold medal in all five events at the 2023 Slovenian Junior Championships, she was selected to represent Slovenia at the 2023 Junior World Championships in Cluj-Napoca, Romania. Together with teammate Urša Kračman, she took 15th place in Team competition. She placed 21st with Hoop, 10th with Ball and 11th with Ribbon. At 1st Balkan Championships in November 2023, she won bronze medal in Clubs and Ball final, as well as in Team competition.

In 2024, she competed at 1st European Cup, held in Baku, Azerbaijan and qualified to two apparatus finals (8th in Hoop and 7th in Ball). Alja was selected to represent Slovenia together with Urša Kračman at the 2024 European Championships in Budapest, Hungary. They placed 8th in Team competition which is the best Slovenian result. Alja also qualified to two apparatus finals, winning historic silver medal in clubs and 7th place in ball final. In September, she competed at 2nd Balkan Championships in Budva, Montenegro. She won gold medal in team competition with teammate Urša Kračman, gold in ball and clubs final and silver medal in hoop final.

=== Senior ===
Alja became a senior in 2025, but missed the spring season, including Slovenian Championships, due to a stress fracture in her foot that began developing at the end of 2024 and forced her to sit out much of the season. At the end of June, she presented two new compositions at a competition in Slovenia. In July, she made her senior international debut at Milano World Cup, where she took 35th place in all-around. In August, she was selected to represent Slovenia at the 2025 World Championships in Rio de Janeiro, Brazil. She took 46th place in all-around qualifications.

In 2026 she started her season competing at MTM tournament in Ljubljana and won silver medals in clubs and ribbon finals behind Darja Varfolomeev. On March 28-30, she competed at Sofia World Cup, taking 60th place in all-around, due to mistakes on first day. In April, she won gold medal in all-around at Slovenian Championships. She competed at Baku World Cup, and took 23rd place in all-around. She was selected to represent Slovenia at the 2026 European Championships, but withdrew due to back injury. In August, she was selected to represent Slovenia at the 2026 World Championships in Frankfurt, Germany. She took 54th place in all-around qualifications. Afterwards, she represented Slovenia alongside Dora Valant at the 2026 Mediterranean Games in Taranto, Italy, and took 6th place in all-around final.

== Achievements ==
- First Slovenian rhythmic gymnast to qualify to Apparatus final at Junior European Championships.
- First Slovenian rhythmic gymnast to win a medal in an Apparatus final at Junior European Championships.
- First Slovenian rhythmic gymnast to win a silver medal at the Junior European Championships.

== Routine music information ==
Year	Apparatus	Music title
2027	Hoop	Elegy of the End by Lappy
2027	Ball	Remember My Name by Power-Haus, Lloren, Berlin Aires, Jonathon Deering
2027	Clubs	
2027	Ribbon	
2026	Hoop	Final Act by Power-Haus, Ros Stephen
2026	Ball	Remember My Name by Power-Haus, Lloren, Berlin Aires, Jonathon Deering
2026	Clubs	
2026	Ribbon	Winter by Duomo
2025	Hoop	Final Act by Power-Haus, Ros Stephen
2025	Ball	Believer by Christina
2025	Clubs	
2025	Ribbon	Horizon of Memories by Eternal Eclipse
2024	Hoop	Gloria Regali by Tommee Profitt, Fleurie
2024	Ball	Reflection by Christina Aguilera
2024	Clubs	Stalker's Tango by Autoheart
2024	Ribbon	We are justice by Gabriel Saban

== Competitive highlights ==
International: Senior
Year	Event	AA	Team	Hoop	Ball	Clubs	Ribbon
2026	Mediterranean Games	6th					
2026	World Championships	54th (Q)		68th (Q)	57th (Q)	34th (Q)	49th (Q)
2026	World Cup Baku	23rd		21st (Q)	24th (Q)	21st (Q)	32nd (Q)
2026	World Cup Sofia	60th		79th (Q)	36th (Q)	54th (Q)	55th (Q)
2026	IT MTM Cup	7th		14th (Q)	23rd (Q)	2nd	2nd
2025	World Championships	46th (Q)		39th (Q)	43rd (Q)	51st (Q)	54th (Q)
2025	World Cup Milan	35th		43rd (Q)	32nd (Q)	30th (Q)	28th (Q)
International: Junior
Year	Event	AA	Team	Hoop	Ball	Clubs	Ribbon
2024	Balkan Junior Championships		1st	2nd	1st	1st	
2024	Junior European Championships		8th	10th (Q)	7th	2nd	
2024	European Cup Baku			8th	7th	12th (Q)	10th (Q)
2024	IT Aphrodite Cup	9th		21st (Q)	4th	7th	42nd (Q)
2023	Balkan Junior Championships		3rd		3rd	3rd	4th
2023	Junior World Championships		15th	21st (Q)	10th (Q)		11th (Q)
2023	IT MTM Cup	1st		1st	1st	1st	1st
2023	IT Ritam Cup	2nd		1st	2nd	3rd	5th
2022	IT Tart Cup	6th		4th	5th	27th (Q)	3rd
2022	Junior European Championships		17th	26th (Q)			
2022	IT Irina Deleanu Cup	23rd		24th (Q)	31st	29th (Q)	30th (Q)
National: Senior
Year	Event	AA	Team	Hoop	Ball	Clubs	Ribbon
2026	Slovenian Junior Championships	1st		1st	2nd	1st	1st
National: Junior
Year	Event	AA	Team	Hoop	Ball	Clubs	Ribbon
2024	Slovenian Junior Championships	1st		DNS	DNS	DNS	DNS
2023	Slovenian Junior Championships	1st		1st	1st	1st	1st
Q = Qualifications (Did not advance to Event Final due to the 2 gymnast per country rule, only Top 8 highest score); WR = World Record; WD = Withdrew; NT = No Team Competition; OC = Out of Competition (competed but scores not counted for qualifications/results)
