= Sara Kragulj =

Slovenian rhythmic gymnast

- Full name: Sara Kragulj Ožbolt
- Born: 26 October 1996 (age 29) Ljubljana, Slovenia

Gymnastics career
- Discipline: Rhythmic gymnastics
- Country represented: Slovenia; (2011–2018)
- Club: Moste
- Gym: Športno Društvo GIB
- Head coach: Olga Mancevič
- Assistant coach: Ana Kokalj
Medal record
Representing Slovenia
Rhythmic Gymnastics
National Championships
Gold medal – first place	2016 Ljubljana	Group All-Around
Gold medal – first place	2018 Maribor	5 Hoops
Silver medal – second place	2019 Murska Sobota	Group All-Around
Silver medal – second place	2015 Ljubljana	All-Around
Silver medal – second place	2012 Ljubljana	All-Around
Bronze medal – third place	2014 Ljubljana	All-Around

Sara Kragulj (born 26 October 1996) is a retired Slovenian rhythmic gymnast.

== Career ==
=== Junior ===
Sara was part of junior team together with Katja Bogdanič and Emina Haračič, that represented Slovenia at the 2010 Junior European Championships in Bremen, Germany and finished on 19th place. She was the most successful in the team, competing with ball and hoop, with which she placed 11th in Qualifications.

=== Senior ===
In 2012, she won her first All-around medal at National Championships - silver and also won two silver in Clubs and Ribbon finals and two bronze in Hoop and Ball.

She represented her country at the 2013 Mediterranean Games, where she placed 9th All-Around Final. She competed at the 2013 European Championships - and ended on 28th place All-Around, 48th with Hoop (14.516), 27th with Ball (15.666), 45th with Clubs (14.000) and 42nd with Ribbon (14.433) - and at the 2015 European Championships - and ended on 19th place in Team competition (together with Špela Kratochwill and Monija Čebašek), 40th with Hoop (14.800), 34th with Ball (15.700) and 46th with Clubs (14.533).

In 2016, she switched to rhythmic group gymnastics and became a captain of national senior group. Together with Maša Bizjak, Kaja Purić, Zoja Marija Ivančič and Zala Dornig she competed at the 2016 European Championships and placed 14th in Group All-around. Next year, they took part in the 2017 World Championships in Pesaro, Italy and finished on 24th place in Group All-around. This was the first time Slovenia took part in group competition after so many years. She competed at the 2018 World Championships in Sofia, Bulgaria and finished on 27th place in Group All-around.

In 2019, she and her teammates (Zala Dornig, Zoja Ivančič, Kaja Purič, Tamia Villca Šeme) returned to competition. They competed at the 2019 Summer Universiade in Naples, Italy, where they took 6th place in group all-around, 5th place in 5 balls and 6th place in 3 hoops + 4 clubs.

== Routine music information ==
Year	Apparatus	Music title
2015	Hoop	The Power of Love by Celine Dion
2015	Ball	Sviridov: Romance From Musical Illustration by Large Symphony Orchestra
2015	Clubs	Emigrante by Tanghetto
2015	Ribbon	
2013	Hoop	
2013	Ball	Sviridov: Romance From Musical Illustration by Large Symphony Orchestra
2013	Clubs	Stars Align by Lindsey Stirling
2013	Ribbon	Les Deux Quitares by Charles Aznavour

== Personal life ==
Her younger sister Ana also represented Slovenia in rhythmic gymnastics. In 2021, Sara graduated in physical education at the Faculty of Sports in Ljubljana.

After finishing her gymnastics career, she started coaching rhythmic gymnastics in sports club KRG TiM, owned by former rhythmic gymnast Mojca Rode. Among the others she was a coach of Nastja Podvratnik, who took part in the 2021 Summer World University Games, which were held in Chengdu in 2023.
