= Emina Haračič =

Slovenian rhythmic gymnast

- Full name: Emina Haračič
- Born: 8 July 1995 (age 31) Ljubljana, Slovenia

Gymnastics career
- Discipline: Rhythmic gymnastics
- Country represented: Slovenia (2009–2013)
- Club: Narodni dom
- Gym: Dvorana Krim
- Head coach: Alena Yakubouskaya
- Assistant coach: Alena Salauyova

Emina Haračič (born 8 July 1995) is a Slovenian rhythmic gymnast.
