= Tjaša Šeme =

Slovenian rhythmic gymnast

- Full name: Tjaša Šeme
- Born: 18 November 1986 (age 39) Ljubljana, Slovenia, Yugoslavia

Gymnastics career
- Discipline: Rhythmic gymnastics
- Country represented: Slovenia; (2004–2012)
- Club: Narodni dom
- Gym: Dvorana Krim
- Head coach: Alena Salauyova
- Assistant coach: Alena Yakubouskaya
- Retired: yes
Medal record
Representing Slovenia
Rhythmic gymnastics
National Championships
Gold medal – first place	2010 Maribor	All-Around
Gold medal – first place	2011 Ljubljana	All-Around
Gold medal – first place	2012 Ljubljana	All-Around
Silver medal – second place	2007 Ljubljana	All-Around
Silver medal – second place	2008 Ljubljana	All-Around
Silver medal – second place	2009 Ljubljana	All-Around

Tjaša Seme (born 18 November 1986) is a Slovenian rhythmic gymnast.

In national level, she's the three-time (2006, 2011, 2012) Slovenian National All-Around champion. She competed at the 2012 Gymnastics Olympic Test Event and placed 24th in All-Around qualifications, so she didn't get the ticket for Summer Olympic Games in summer.

== Career ==
She competed at the 2009 World Championships in Mie, Japan, finishing 45th in All-around Qualifications (70.400). She helped team Slovenia place 16th in Team competition. She also qualified to Apparatus finals at the 2009 World Cup Maribor, placing 7th in Ball and Ribbon final.
