= Ekaterina Vedeneeva =

Russian rhythmic gymnast

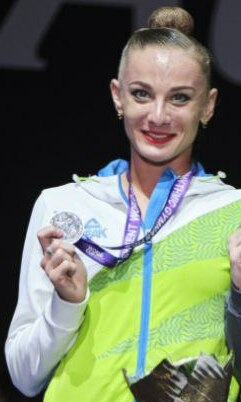
- Vedeneeva in 2022

Personal information
- Full name: Ekaterina Olegovna Vedeneeva
- Alternative name: Jekaterina Vedenejeva
- Nicknames: Katja, Katya
- Born: 23 June 1994 (age 32) Irkutsk, Russia

Gymnastics career
- Discipline: Rhythmic gymnastics
- Country represented: Slovenia; (2018–2024)
- Former countries represented: Russia
- Club: TiM
- Gym: Gimnastični center Ljubljana
- Head coach: Elena Drozhanova
- Former coach: Irina Viner
- Retired: yes
Medal record
Rhythmic gymnastics
Representing Slovenia
Event	1st	2nd	3rd
World Championships	0	0	2
European Championships	0	0	1
FIG World Cup series	2	4	5
FIG World Challenge Cup series	0	3	8
Grand Prix	7	3	6
World Games	0	0	1
Total	9	10	23
World Championships
Bronze medal – third place	2022 Sofia	Ribbon
Bronze medal – third place	2023 Valencia	Ribbon
European Championships
Bronze medal – third place	2023 Baku	Clubs
World Games
Bronze medal – third place	2022 Birmingham	Clubs

Ekaterina Olegovna Vedeneeva (Russian: Екатерина Олеговна Веденеева; Slovene: Jekaterina Olegovna Vedenejeva; born 23 June 1994) is a Russian-born Slovenian retired individual rhythmic gymnast who began competing for Russia, then competed for Slovenia between 2018 and 2024. She now works as a coach in Russia.

She made her debut for Slovenia in August 2018 at the World Cup event in Kazan, Russian Federation. On the national level, she is a four-time (2019, 2021, 2022, 2024) Slovenian National all-around champion. In 2021, she became the first Slovenian rhythmic gymnast to compete at the Olympics when she competed at the Summer Olympics in Tokyo, and she competed again at the 2024 Summer Olympics in Paris, where she qualified for the final. She is the first Slovenian rhythmic gymnast to win a medal at the European and World Championships, and the first Slovenian gymnast of any discipline to win a medal in the history of The World Games.

== Career ==
Her mother, Julia Vedeneeva, has coached rhythmic gymnastics and encouraged her to take up the sport. She started training rhythmic gymnastics in her hometown of Irkutsk in Russia and later moved to Novogorsk, where the main training center for rhythmic gymnastics in Russia is located.

In 2015, Vedeneeva was selected to represent Russia, together with Maria Titova, at the 2015 Summer Universiade in Gwangju, South Korea. She finished in 5th place in the all-around competition, tied with Elizaveta Nazarenkova. She qualified to finals with two apparatuses, placing 5th in the ball final with a score of 17.550 and 7th in the clubs final with a score of 17.250.

=== 2017-2021 Olympic cycle ===
==== 2018 ====
In 2018, she chose to represent Slovenia. She moved to Ljubljana with her coach. On July 31, she officially received her Slovenian citizenship. This gave her the opportunity to start competing at international competitions. In August, she competed at World Cup Kazan in Russia. Vedeneeva placed 8th in the all-around and qualified to two apparatus finals, where she placed 5th with hoop (18.950) and 7th with ball (17.800). In September 2018, she competed at her first World Championships. She helped Slovenia to achieve their best result ever in the team competition, placing 11th together with teammates Aleksandra Podgoršek and Anja Tomazin. She also placed 17th in the all-around qualifications and qualified to the final. She placed 13th, which was also the best result at that time for Slovenia.

==== 2019 ====
In April 2019 she became the first Slovenian to earn a medal at the Rhythmic Gymnastics World Cup, achieving a bronze in the ribbon final at the Tashkent World Cup. At the 2019 European Rhythmic Gymnastics Championships, in Baku, Azerbaijan, she qualified for the club final, where she finished in 7th place. That same year, she became the first Slovenian to win a medal at the Rhythmic Gymnastics Grand Prix after winning a silver medal in the ball final at the Holon Grand Prix in Israel. At the 2019 World Championships in Baku, Azerbaijan, she qualified to the individual all-around final, where she placed 17th with total score of 78.650, just missing out on an Olympic berth by one place.

==== 2020 ====
In 2020, she started the season at Grand Prix in Moscow, where she placed 6th in the all-around competition. The next day, she competed in all of the apparatus finals and won a bronze medal in the ribbon final with a score of 19.900. She represented Slovenia at the 2020 European Championships in Kyiv, Ukraine and finished on 13th place in the all-around competition.

==== 2021 ====
In 2021, she started the season at the Grand Prix stage in Moscow, where she placed 8th in the all-around competition and qualified to all the apparatus finals. She won a bronze medal in the ribbon final with a score of 22.050. During the 2021 World Cup series, Vedeneeva qualified for an Olympic berth as the highest ranked eligible gymnast who had not already qualified for the Olympics, in front of Uzbekistan's Sabina Tashkenbaeva and Japan's Chisaki Oiwa. At the Moscow World Challenge Cup, she won a bronze medal in the all-around competition - the first World Cup all-around medal for Slovenia. The following day, she also won three more bronze medals in ball, clubs and ribbon in the apparatus finals.

At the 2020 Olympic Games (delayed and held in 2021 due to the Covid pandemic), Vedeneeva finished sixteenth in the qualification round for the individual all-around final. She was the first rhythmic gymnast to represent Slovenia at the Olympics.

In October 2021, she competed at the 2021 Rhythmic Gymnastics World Championships in Kitakyushu, Japan, qualifying to the all-around final and finishing in 12th place. She also qualified for the ribbon final, achieving 7th place. It was the first time that a Slovenian gymnast had managed to advance to a world championship apparatus final.

=== 2022-2024 Olympic cycle ===
==== 2022 ====
In June 2022, she won her third Slovenian National all-around title, almost 22 points ahead of silver medalist Brigita Krašovec.

Vedeneeva was the first Slovenian rhythmic gymnast to compete at a World Games at the 2022 World Games in Birmingham, USA. She placed 4th in the hoop and ribbon finals and took a historic bronze medal in the clubs final.

On 14–18 September 2022, Vedeneeva competed at her fourth World Championships in Sofia, Bulgaria. She qualified to the ball, clubs and ribbon finals and placed 6th, 8th and 3rd in them respectively. Her bronze medal with the ribbon was her first World Championships medal and also the first medal for Slovenia at an Rhythmic Gymnastics World Championships. In the individual all-around qualifications, she took 6th place and advanced to the final, where she finished in 7th place, her best result to that date.

==== 2023 ====
Vedeneeva began her 2023 season on 17 March by appearing at the World Cup in Athens. She finished 7th in the all-around final, won a gold medal in the ribbon final, and was 6th in clubs and 4th in ball. She also competed at the World Cups in Sofia (31 March - 2 April, 9th in the all around and 6th in ball); Tashkent (14-16 April, 3rd in ball, and 4th in the all-around, clubs, ribbon and hoop); Baku (21-23 April, 12th in the all-around, 8th in clubs and 4th in ribbon); and Milan (21-23 July, 9th in the all-around competition, 4th in ribbon and 7th in clubs).

At the 2023 European Championships in May, Vedeeneva finished 6th in the all-around final, 4th with the ribbon, and 3rd with clubs. The bronze medal was her first European Championships medal and also the first won by a gymnast representing Slovenia. In addition, she appeared at the World Challenge Cup in Cluj Napoca (14-16 July, finishing 9th in the all-around and 5th in clubs).

At the 2023 World Championships in August, Vedeeneva she scored 97.550 in qualification, earning herself an Olympic spot and all-around final place and also qualifying for the ball and hoop apparatus finals (where she finished 8th and 6th respectively). At the competition, she changed her ball routine from music performed by Russian and Putin-ally Philipp Kirkorov to a song by the Ukrainian Mariya Chaykowskaya. Vedeeneva also qualified to the ribbon final, where she beat the score of Italy's Sofia Raffaeli by 0.05 to end in third place. She thus defended her 2022 World Championship bronze medal. She finished 9th in the all-around final.

==== 2024 ====
Vedeneeva began her 2024 season at the Grand Prix in Marbella, Spain. She was sixth in the all-around and won silver in the ribbon final behind Stiliana Nikolova. She also won bronze medals in the ball and hoop finals. At the Athens World Cup in Palaio Faliro, Greece, she placed 4th in the all-around and qualified to the clubs final, where she again placed 4th. She competed at Grand Prix Thiais at the end of March and won the bronze medal in the all-around behind Takhmina Ikromova and Hélène Karbanov. In April, she finished 4th in the all-around at Tashkent World Cup and qualified to all four finals. She was 4th in the ribbon and ball finals, 6th in clubs and 7th in the hoop final.

On 3–5 May, Vedeneeva competed at the inaugural 2024 European Cup Baku, where she took 6th place in the all-around qualifications and qualified to all apparatus finals. Two weeks later on May 18, she won her fourth national title. She said that she was very happy with her performance and that she had wanted to show she was well-prepared for the 2024 European Championships being held the week after.

At the European Championships, Vedeneeva finished in 11th place in the all-around final after a drop at the end of her clubs routine and having a knot in her ribbon routine. Vedeneeva expressed satisfaction with her stronger performances with the ball and hoop but dissatisfaction with her score for the hoop, accusing the judges of bias. She said, "There were six European championships in my career, and they were all very biased, and not just to me. The scandal that took place yesterday with the license for the Olympic Games reaffirms the full subjectivity of our sport", referencing the Polish Gymnastics Federation's accusation that one of their gymnast's scores were unfairly lowered to prevent her from winning the Olympic quota available at the Championships. Vedeneeva qualified for one apparatus final, hoop, and came in 5th place.

Vedeneeva competed at the Milan World Cup in late June. She came in sixth in the all-around and qualified for three of the four apparatus finals. The last day of the competition, June 23, fell on her 30th birthday, for which she was presented flowers.

On August 8–9, she represented Slovenia at the 2024 Olympic Games in Paris, France, where she was the first Slovenian gymnast to qualify to the individual all-around final. In the finals, she placed 6th. Afterward, she said that it was the best performance she could give and that she was not immediately planning on retiring, although she was unsure of whether she would continue for another four years.

Vedeneeva announced her retirement from competitive sport on 9 May 2025 via her Instagram profile. She began training to become a judge and changed her nationality for gymnastics back to Russia; while she expressed thanks for the opportunities the Slovenian gymnastics federation had given her, she said that they had mutually parted ways, as the Slovenian federation was not able to offer her any pay for working for them. She also coaches children in Krasnoyarsk.

== Gymnastics technique ==
Vedeneeva is known for the strength of her classical ballet technique and her pivot turns in various positions. She has also discussed the challenges of both incorporating enough apparatus difficulty elements in a routine to gain a high enough difficulty score to be competitive and preserving the artistry of rhythmic gymnastics in the newly open-ended marking system of the 2016-2021 quad which, she believes, prefers the former.

== Detailed Olympic results ==
Year	Competition Description	Location	Music	Apparatus	Rank-Final	Score-Final	Rank-Qualifying	Score-Qualifying
2020	Olympics	Tokyo		All-around			16th	89.700
2020	Olympics	Tokyo	"Libertango" by The Swingle Singers	Hoop			17th	22.800
2020	Olympics	Tokyo	"Boléro: Tempo di Bolero" by London Symphony Orchestra, Claudio Abbado	Ball			15th	23.550
2020	Olympics	Tokyo	"Белый лебедь" by Tamara Gverdtsiteli	Clubs			18th	22.550
2020	Olympics	Tokyo	"Nocturne" by Tamara Gverdtsiteli, Dmitry Duzhev	Ribbon			11th	20.800
2024	Olympics	Paris		All-around	6th	131.900	6th	130.800
2024	Olympics	Paris	"Mind Heist: Evolution" by Zack Hemsey	Hoop	7th	34.100	7th	34.150
2024	Olympics	Paris	"Demain n'existe pas" by Lara Fabian	Ball	8th	31.950	11th	32.600
2024	Olympics	Paris	"Swan Lake (Act IV Allegro)" by Smolensk Symphonic Orchestra	Clubs	8th	33.150	8th	32.300
2024	Olympics	Paris	"Do not Deny, if Loving" by Vlad Nezhniy	Ribbon	5th	32.700	8th	31.750

== Achievements ==
- First Slovenian rhythmic gymnast to win a medal in an individual apparatus final at the FIG World Cup series.
- First Slovenian rhythmic gymnast to win a gold medal in an individual apparatus final at the FIG World Cup series.
- First Slovenian rhythmic gymnast to win a medal in an individual all-around at the FIG World Cup series.
- First Slovenian rhythmic gymnast to compete at the Olympic Games (twice).
- First Slovenian rhythmic gymnast or Slovenian gymnast of any discipline to win a medal at the World Games.
- First Slovenian rhythmic gymnast to win a medal at the World Championship.
- First Slovenian rhythmic gymnast to win a medal at the European Championship.
- First Slovenian rhythmic gymnast to qualify to the Individual All-around Final at the Olympic Games.

== Routine music information ==
Year	Apparatus	Music title
2024	Hoop	Mind Heist: Evolution by Zack Hemsey
2024	Ball	Demain n'existe pas by Lara Fabian
2024	Clubs	"Swan Lake (Act IV Allegro)", by Smolensk Symphonic Orchestra
2024	Ribbon	Do not Deny, if Loving by Vlad Nezhniy
2023	Hoop (first)	Je n'attendais que vous by Garou
2023	Hoop (second)	Мама by Anzhelika Varum
2023	Ball (first)	Dulcea Si Tandra Mea Fiara by Catalina Caraus and Eugen Doga
2023	Ball (second)	Diva by Filipp Kirkorov
2023	Ball (third)	Поговори со мной by Марія Чайковська
2023	Clubs	Trije ljubčki by Helena Blagne
2023	Ribbon	Я тебя никогда не забудуn by Тамара Гвердцители and Д. Дюжев (Tamara Gverdtsiteli and Dmitry Duzhev)
2022	Hoop (first)	Et Su Tu N'existais Pas by Toto Cutugno, Veronika Agapova
2022	Hoop (second)	Nocturne No. 20 in C Sharp Minor, Op. Posth by Frederique Chopin
2022	Ball (first)	Libertango by Lise de la Salle
2022	Ball (second)	The Winner Takes It All by Carla Bruni
2022	Clubs (first)	Malagueña by Connie Francis
2022	Clubs (second)	Катя-Катерина by Андрей Державин
2022	Ribbon (first)	Поговори со мной by Мария Чайковская
2022	Ribbon (second)	Эхо любви by Анна Герман
2021	Hoop	Libertango by The Swingle Singers
2021	Ball	Boléro: Tempo di Bolero by London Symphony Orchestra, Claudio Abbado
2021	Clubs	Белый лебедь by Tamara Gverdtsiteli
2021	Ribbon	Nocturne by Tamara Gverdtsiteli, Dmitry Duzhev
2020	Hoop	Piano Concerto No.2 in C Minor, Op.18: I. Moderato by Sviatoslav Richter
2020	Ball	Boléro by London Symphony Orchestra, Claudio Abbado
2020	Clubs	Bahama Mama by Boney M.
2020	Ribbon	unknown
2019	Hoop (first)	Ka-Ching! by Shania Twain
2019	Hoop (second)	Malagueña by Connie Francis
2019	Ball	Lyra by Maksim Mrvica
2019	Clubs	Harika by Ozan Doğulu
2019	Ribbon	Hoşgeldin by Nida Öz
2018	Hoop	Madrid by Sayed Balaha
2018	Ball	Sunrise, Sunset by Fiddler on the Roof
2018	Clubs	Requiem by Alma
2018	Ribbon	The Color Of The Night by Lauren Christy
2017	Hoop	Is It Right by Elaiza
2017	Ball	Baby I Don't Know (I Love You Remix) by DJ Jessie Cole
2017	Clubs	Ravel's Bolero by Ray Conniff
2017	Ribbon	"Caruso" by Lara Fabian
2016	Hoop	Sweet Dreams (Are Made of This) by Emily Browning
2016	Ball	Les Demoiselles by Rochefort Theme
2016	Clubs	Asturias (feat. Jesse Cook) by William Joseph
2016	Ribbon	L'eté indien by Piano Bar Band
2015	Hoop	Le Bien Qui Fait Mal by Mozart L'Opéra Rock
2015	Ball	Fantasy No 1 by Tetyana Hoch & Lazy Pixel
2015	Clubs	Asturias (feat. Jesse Cook) by William Joseph
2015	Ribbon	L'eté indien by Piano Bar Band

== Competitive highlights ==
(Team competitions in seniors are held only at the World Championships, Europeans and other Continental Games.)

International: Senior
Year	Event	AA	Team	Hoop	Ball	Clubs	Ribbon
2024	Olympic Games	6th					
2024	World Cup Milan	6th		13th (Q)	6th	5th	7th
2024	European Championships	11th		5th	11th (Q)	9th (Q)	15th (Q)
2024	World Challenge Cup Portimao	4th		9th (Q)	3rd	3rd	2nd
2024	European Cup Baku	6th (Q)		6th	5th	4th	5th
2024	World Cup Tashkent	4th		7th	4th	6th	4th
2024	Grand Prix Thiais	3rd		5th	2nd	1st	1st
2024	World Cup Athens	4th		10th (Q)	14th (Q)	4th	9th (Q)
2024	Grand Prix Marbella	6th		3rd	3rd	9th	2nd
2023	World Championships	9th		6th	6th	9th (Q)	3rd
2023	World Cup Milan	9th		21st (Q)	10th (Q)	7th	4th
2023	European Championships	6th		9th (Q)	16th (Q)	3rd	4th
2023	World Cup Baku	12th		30th (Q)	12th (Q)	8th	4th
2023	World Cup Tashkent	4th		4th	3rd	4th	4th
2023	World Cup Sofia	9th			6th	14th (Q)	12th˙
2023	World Cup Athens	7th		14th (Q)	4th	6th	1st
2023	Grand Prix Marbella	6th		9th (Q)	5th	8th	4th
2022	Grand Prix Brno	1st		1st	1st	1st	1st
2022	World Championships	7th		9th (Q)	6th	8th	3rd
2022	World Games			4th	11th (Q)	3rd	4th
2022	World Cup Pesaro	6th		15th (Q)	2nd	4th	3rd
2022	World Challenge Cup Pamplona	3rd		2nd	4th	3rd	2nd
2022	European Championship	6th		6th	6th	4th	5th
2022	World Cup Baku	5th		11th (Q)	9th (Q)	7th	3rd
2022	World Cup Tashkent	2nd		2nd	3rd	2nd	1st
2022	Grand Prix Moscow	6th		5th	4th	8th	3rd
2021	World Championships	12th		16th (Q)	17th (Q)	14th (Q)	7th
2021	Olympic Games	16th (Q)					
2021	World Cup Moscow	3rd		5th	3rd	3rd	3rd
2021	European Championships	12th		9th (Q)	17th (Q)	14th (Q)	22nd (Q)
2021	World Cup Pesaro	11th		15th (Q)	10th (Q)	19th (Q)	4th
2021	World Cup Baku	11th		19th (Q)	18th (Q)	9th (Q)	7th
2021	World Cup Tashkent	6th		10th (Q)	7th	6th	9th (Q)
2021	World Cup Sofia	12th		5th	11th (Q)	24th (Q)	6th
2021	Grand Prix Moscow	8th		4th	4th	5th	3rd
2020	European Championships	13th					
2020	Grand Prix Moscow	6th		8th	8th	5th	3rd
2019	World Championships	17th	22nd	17th (Q)	11th (Q)	17th (Q)	21st (Q)
2019	World Cup Kazan	9th		18th (Q)	19th (Q)	9th (Q)	6th
2019	World Cup Cluj-Napoca	14th		11th (Q)	10th (Q)	9th (Q)	24th (Q)
2019	Grand Prix Holon	4th			2nd	6th	5th
2019	European Championships			10th (Q)	10th (Q)	7th	10th (Q)
2019	World Cup Baku	21st		35th (Q)	17th (Q)	20th (Q)	23rd (Q)
2019	World Cup Tashkent	7th		13th (Q)	7th	4th	3rd
2019	World Cup Pesaro	15th		36th (Q)	10th (Q)	11th (Q)	18th (Q)
2019	Grand Prix Thiais	18th		20th (Q)	16th (Q)	9th	24th (Q)
2019	Grand Prix Moscow	15th		16th (Q)	15th (Q)	12th (Q)	18th (Q)
2018	World Championships	13th	11th	10th (Q)	27th (Q)	24th (Q)	14th (Q)
2018	World Cup Kazan	8th		5th	7th	12th (Q)	12th (Q)
2018	Luxembourg Trophy	1st		1st	1st	1st	1st
2018	Aura Cup	1st		1st	4th	1st	1st
2017	International Tournament of Holon	2nd		3rd	6th	4th	1st
2017	Luxembourg Trophy	1st		1st	1st	1st	2nd
2015	Summer Universiade	5th		9th (Q)	5th	7th	10th (Q)
National
Year	Event	AA	Team	Hoop	Ball	Clubs	Ribbon
2024	Slovenian Championships	1st					
2022	Slovenian Championships	1st		DNS	DNS	DNS	DNS
2021	Slovenian Championships	1st		DNS	DNS	DNS	DNS
2019	Slovenian Championships	1st	2nd	DNS	DNS	DNS	DNS
2017	Russian Championships	5th		5th	3rd		5th
2015	Russian Championships	7th		5th	5th	3rd	4th
Q = Qualifications (Did not advance to Event Final due to the 2 gymnast per country rule, only Top 8 highest score); WR = World Record; WD = Withdrew; NT = No Team Competition; DNS = Did Not Start

== See also ==
- Nationality changes in gymnastics
