= Harika =

Harika is a female given name of Arabic origin, meaning wonderful, excellent or beautiful. It is used in Turkey, and also in India. Notable people with the given name include:

- Harika Dronavalli (born 1991), Indian chess player
- Harika Eldaş (born 1990), Turkish basketball player
