= Ribbon (rhythmic gymnastics) =

Performing apparatus

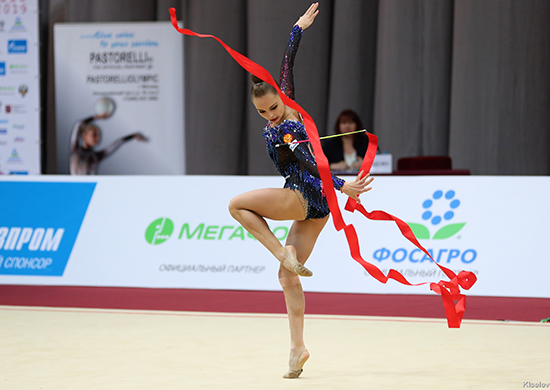
Arina Averina with ribbon at the Moscow Grand Prix 2019

The ribbon is an apparatus used in the sport of rhythmic gymnastics. It is one of the five apparatuses utilized in this discipline, alongside the ball, clubs, hoop, and rope.

== History ==
The ribbon was popularized by dancer Asaf Messerer, who was inspired by seeing Chinese acrobats dance with silk ribbons. In the 1940s, he began incorporating a ribbon into his choreography. The ribbon became a rhythmic gymnastics apparatus in 1971. From 2001-2012, each apparatus had a compulsory body group of movements that had to predominate in the exercise; for ribbon, this was pivots (turns).

== Specifications and technique ==
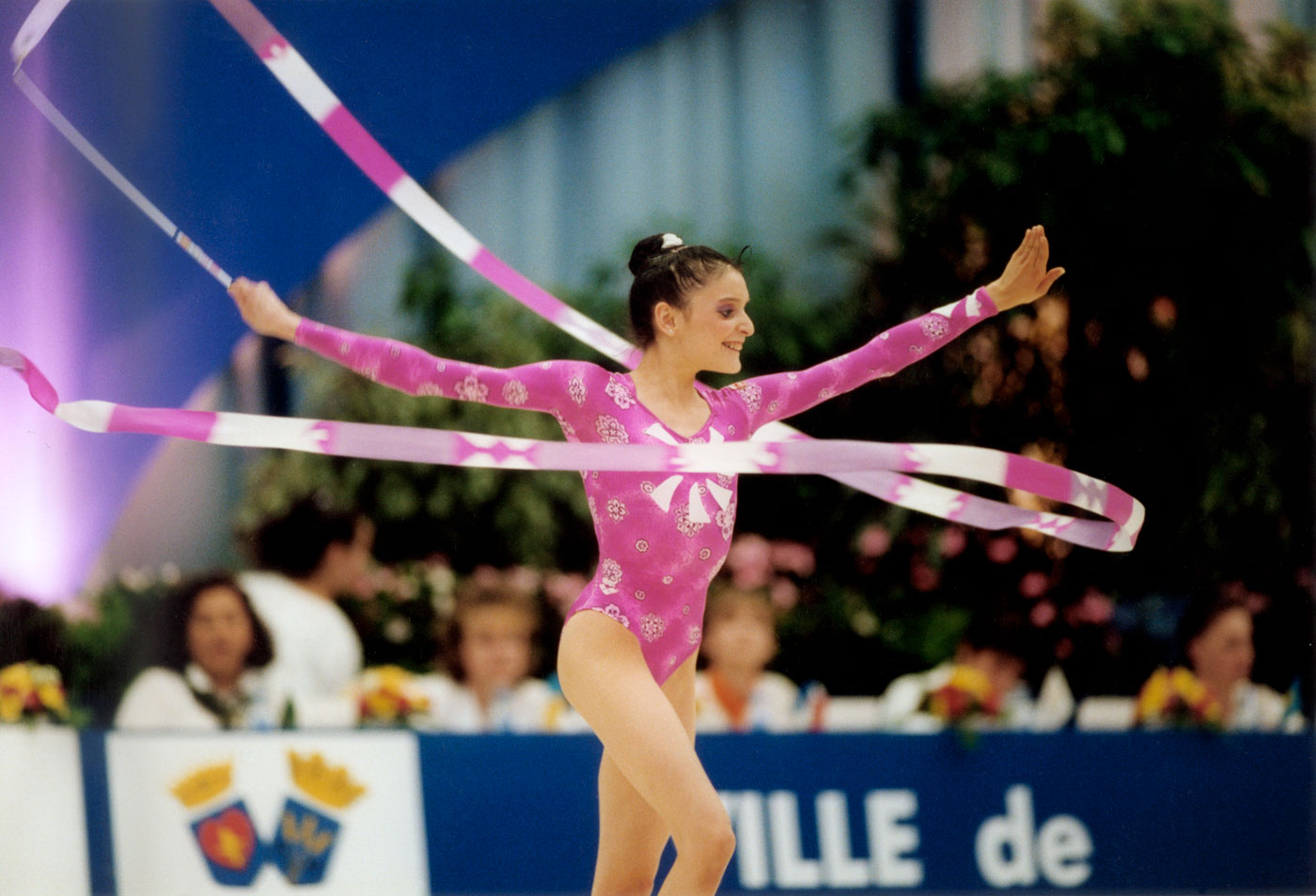
Esther Domínguez competes with a patterned ribbon

The official specifications for the ribbon are as follows:

- Length: 6m
- Width: 4-6cm

The handle can be of any color and may be made of wood, bamboo, metal, or a synthetic material, such as fiberglass. It has a maximum diameter of 1 cm (^{2}/_{5}") at its widest, a cylindrical or conical shape, and may have an anti-slip grip with a maximum length of 10 cm (4"). The ribbon itself is made of satin or another similar cloth, and can be of any color. It may be multicolored and have designs on it, and it is doubled over for a length of 1m and sewn down along both edges at the end that attaches to the handle. A thread or ring swivel attaches the ribbon to the handle.

Rhythmic gymnastics routines require the ribbon to constantly be in motion and create defined shapes. The ribbon is generally held by the handle with the thumb and pointer finger extended. Because of the ribbon's length, the gymnast can easily become tangled in it or cause knots to form; juniors and beginner gymnasts may use shorter ribbons. The length also makes it sensitive to currents in the air, so air conditioning is typically turned off while the ribbon is being competed; temperatures in the arena at the 2023 World Championships reached 35 °C (95 °F) during the qualification round that included ribbon. Penalties are taken for continuing to perform after a knot has formed without undoing the knot or for allowing the end of the ribbon to lie static on the floor.

== Elements ==
Gymnasts perform a variety of elements with the ribbon, including throwing the ribbon high in the air, throwing the ribbon stick and then pulling it back by the end of the ribbon fabric, and creating different patterns with the movement of the ribbon. During the exercise, the gymnast should primarily perform elements that are specific to the ribbon. The elements that are considered to be particular to the ribbon are:

- Spirals:
  - Small, tight circles of the ribbon
  - A "swordsman" where the gymnast passes an arm and stick through a spiral pattern
- Rotational movements:
  - Rotating the ribbon stick around a hand
  - Wrapping or unwrapping the ribbon around the body
  - Holding the stick with a body part other than the hands during movements or rotations to create a full circle of fabric around the body
- Snakes: Small, tight waves of the ribbon back and forth
- Boomerangs: Throwing the ribbon stick, then pulling the end of the ribbon fabric while it is extended and catching the stick again
- Rolling the ribbon handle along part of the body
- Small throws where the stick rotates during flight before the gymnast catches it
- Passing the body through or over the ribbon while it is making a defined shape

== Photo gallery ==
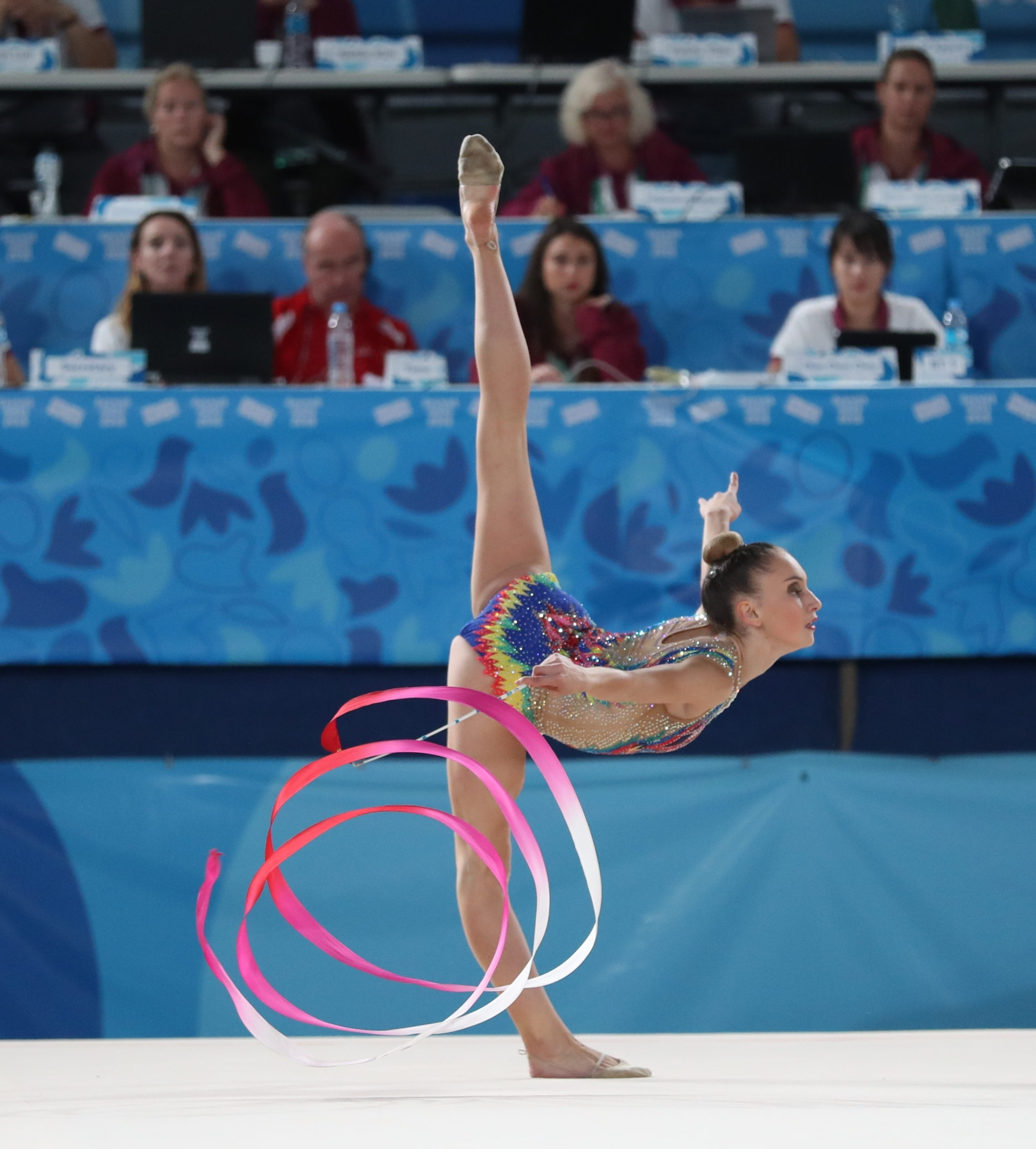
Spirals during a balance (Talisa Torretti)

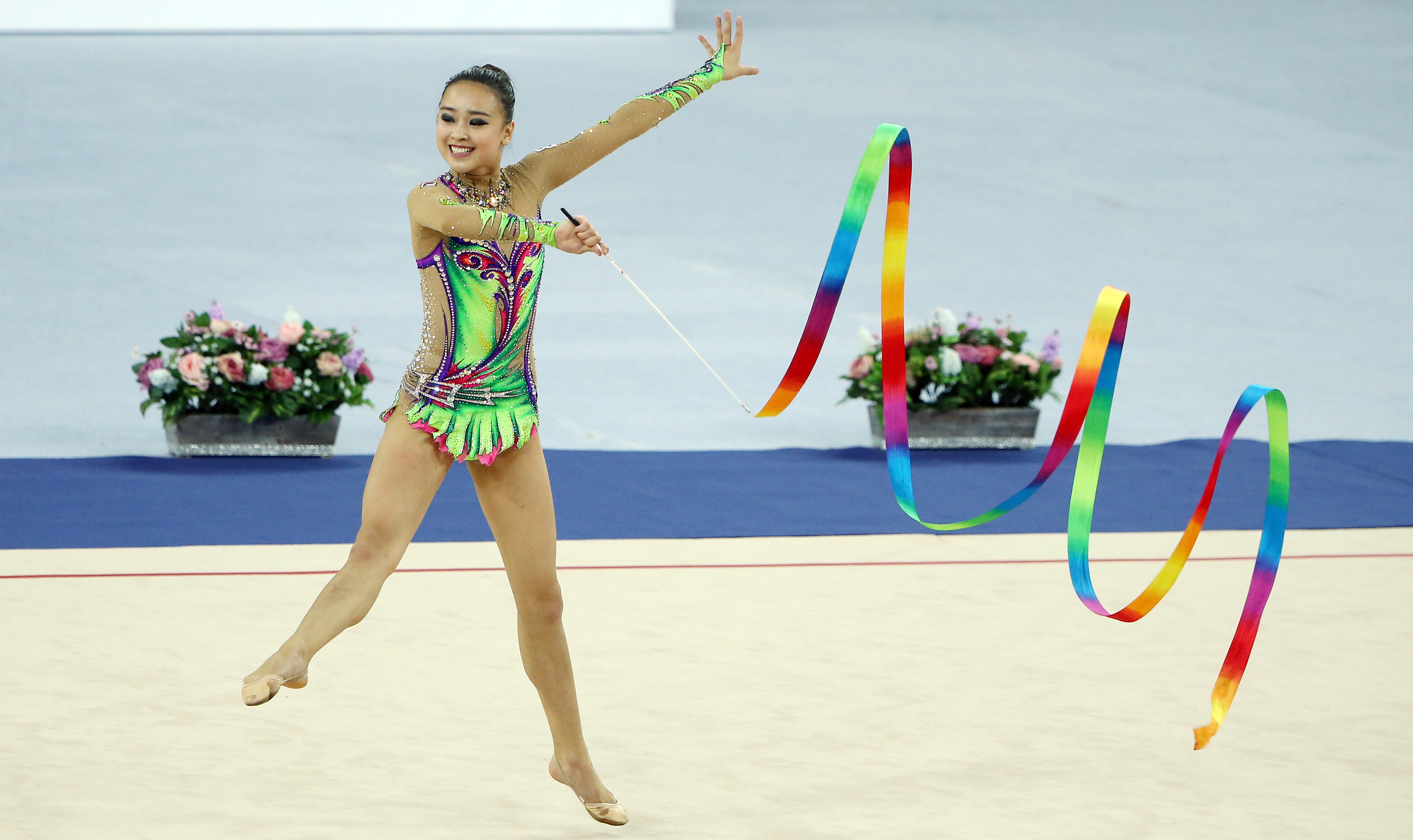
Spirals in motion (Son Yeon Jae)

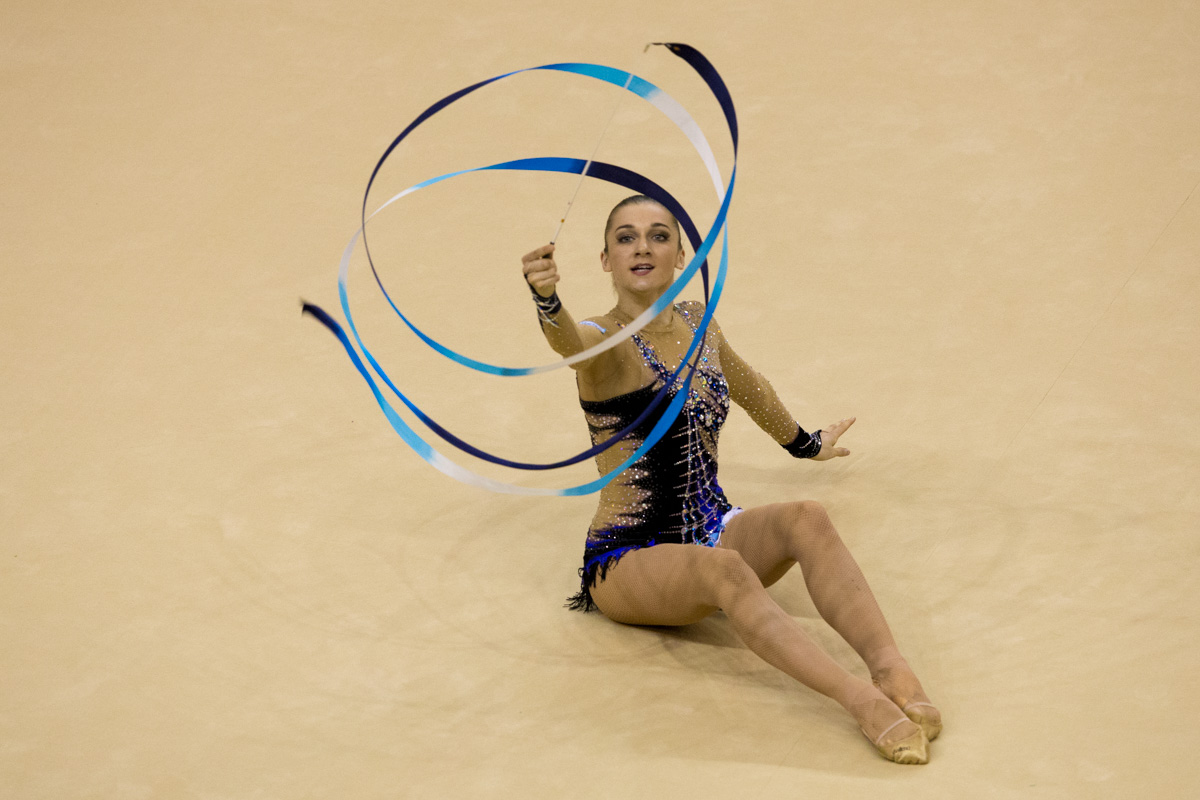
A "swordsman" (Ekaterina Volkova)

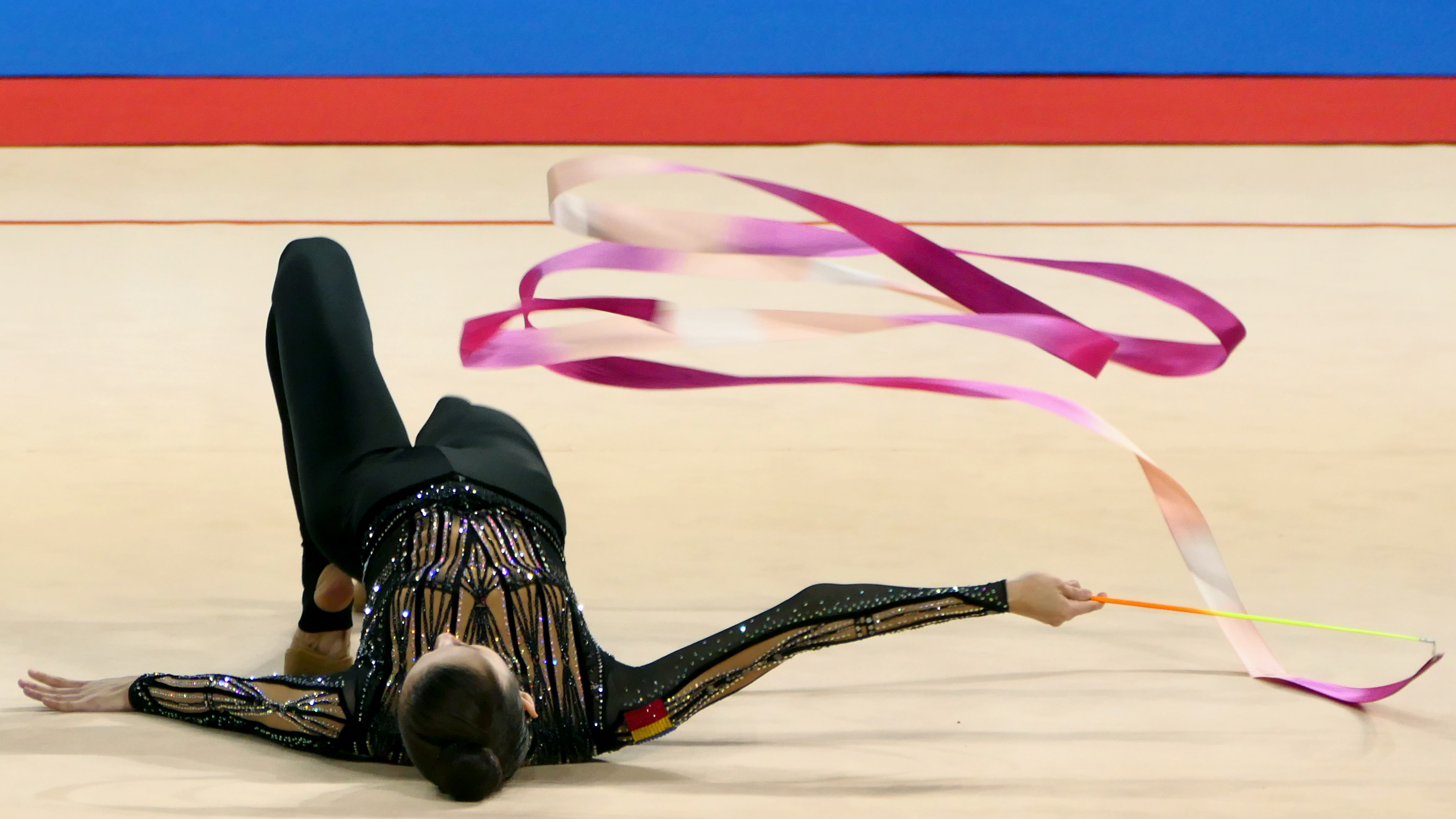
Snakes performed horizontally (Andreea Verdes)

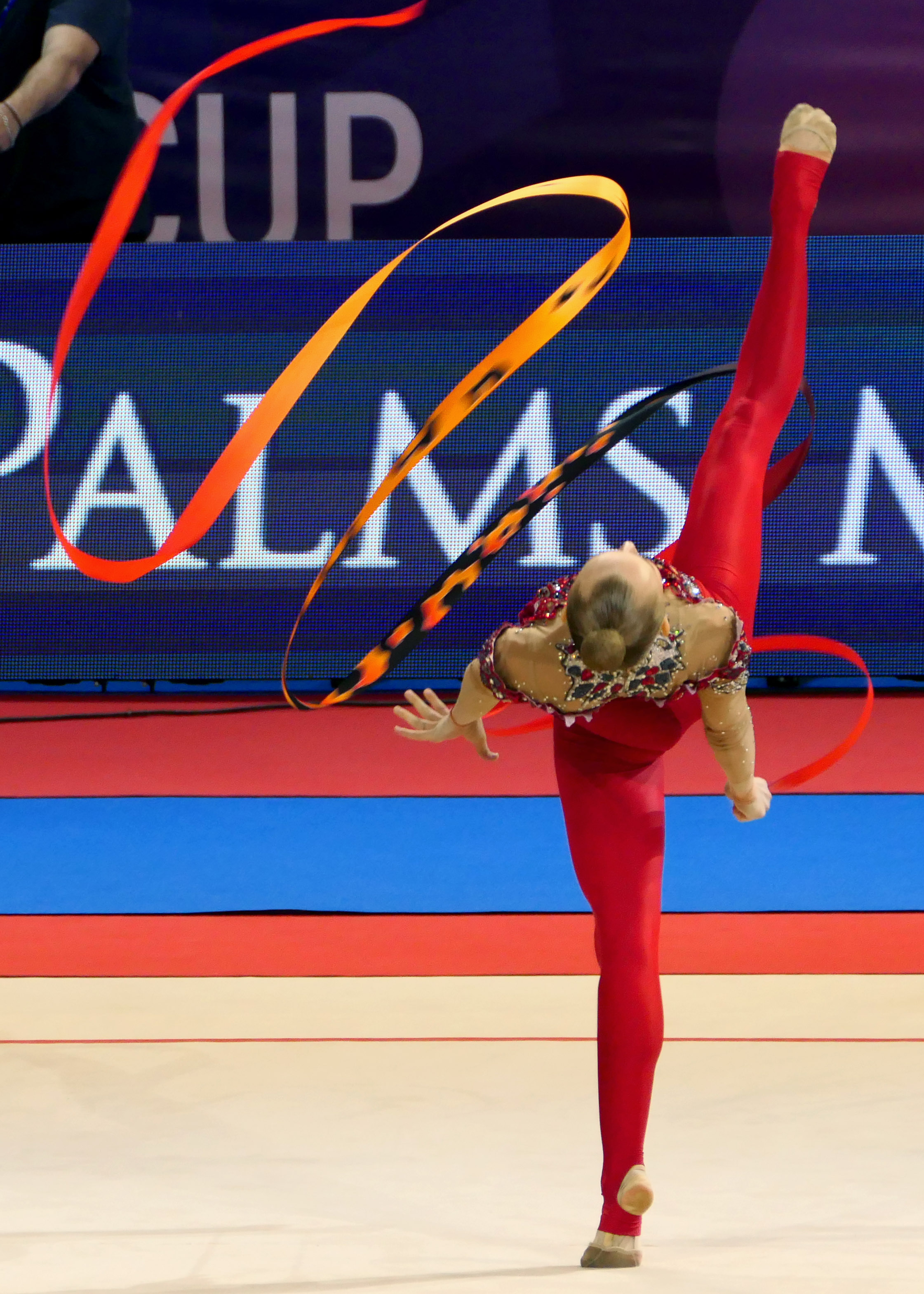
Snakes performed diagonally (Viktoriia Onopriienko)

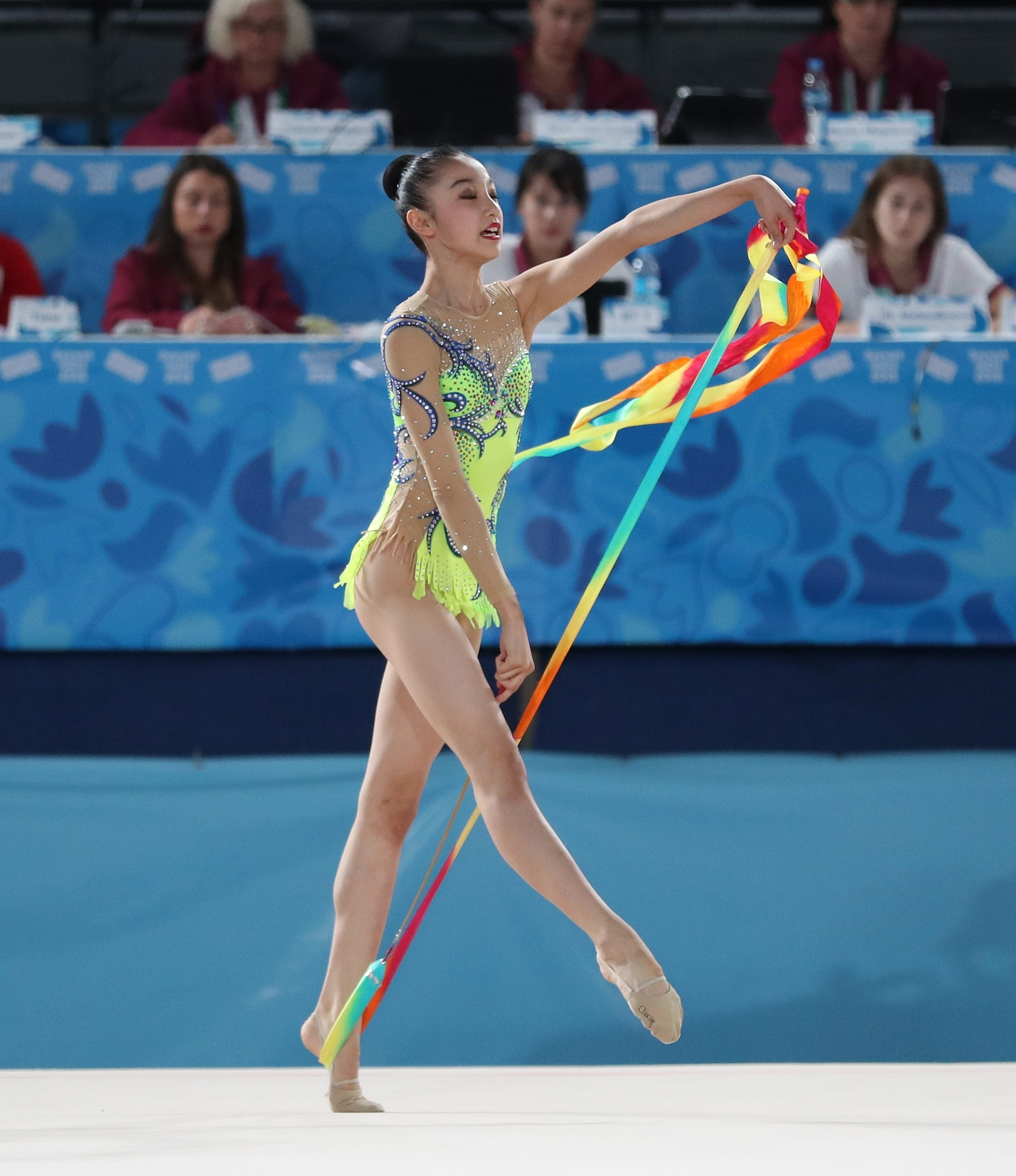
Preparing to throw the ribbon with a foot (Aino Yamada)

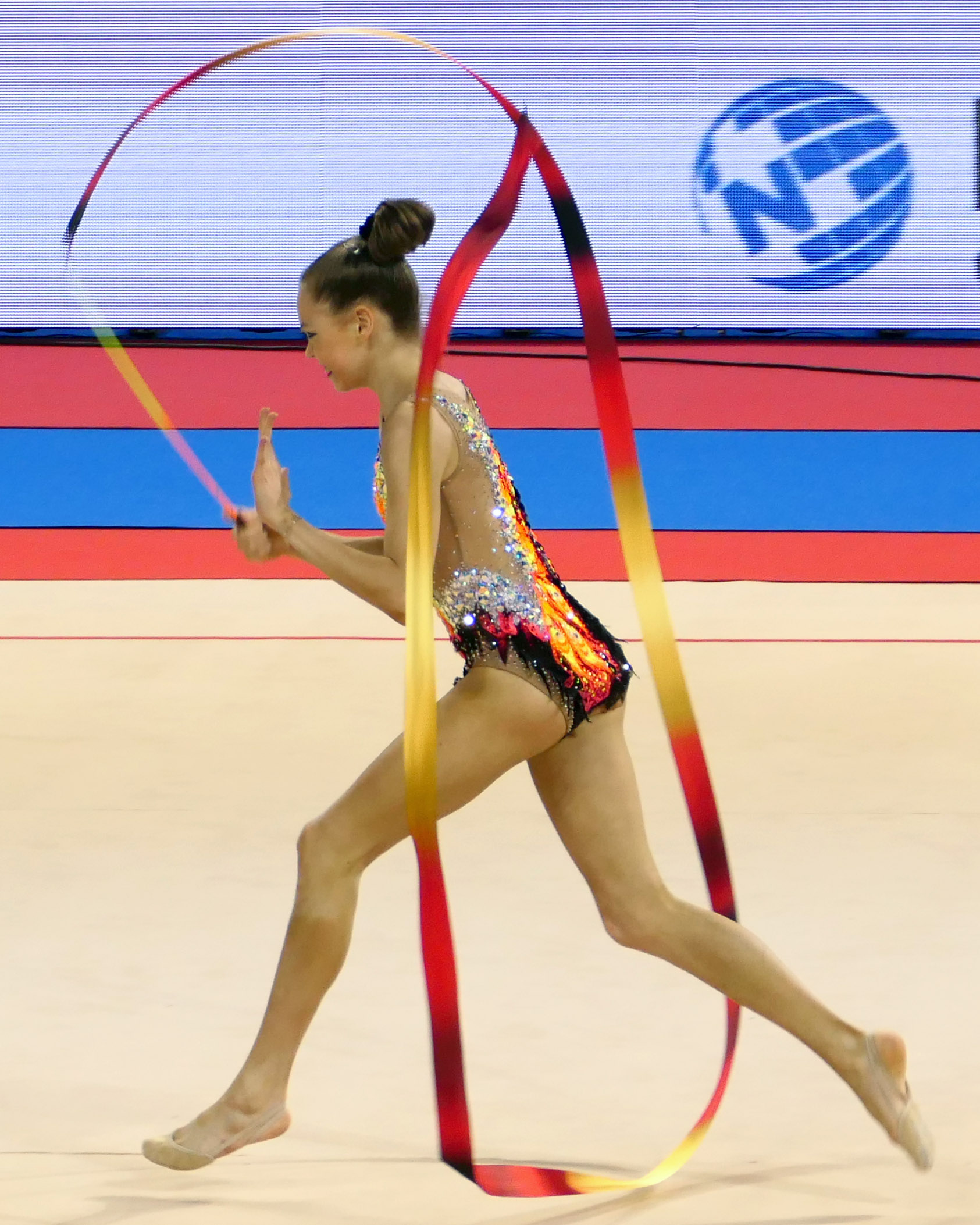
Passing through a large circle (Vera Tugolukova)

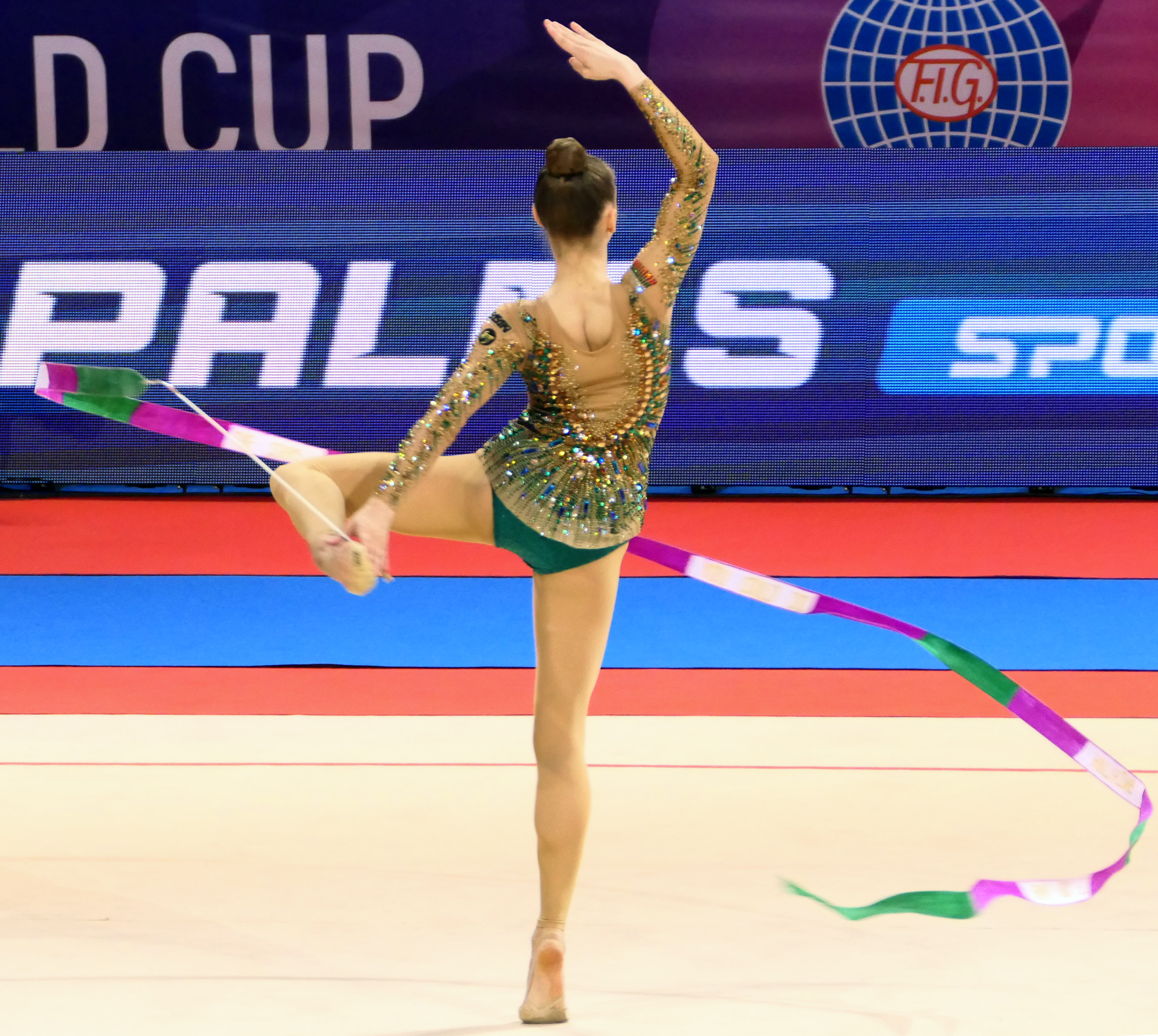
Holding the ribbon handle with a foot during a rotational element (Boryana Kaleyn)

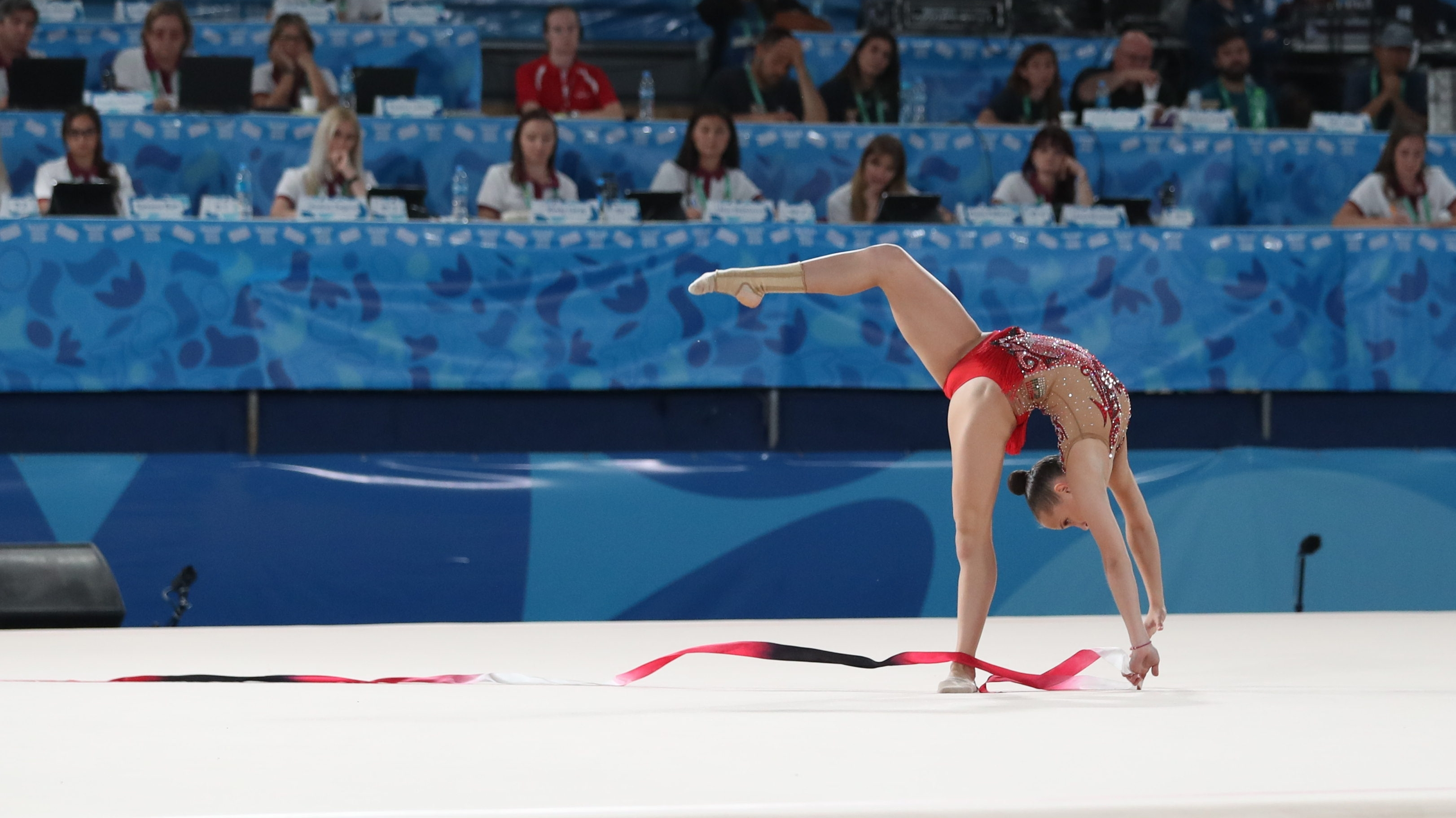
Performing a boomerang with a walkover, using a foot to help pull the ribbon (Tatyana Volozhanina)
