= Aja Jerman =

Slovenian rhythmic gymnast

- Full name: Aja Jerman Bukavec
- Born: 20 August 1999 (age 27) Ljubljana, Slovenia

Gymnastics career
- Discipline: Rhythmic gymnastics
- Country represented: Slovenia (2014–present)
- Club: Narodni dom
- Gym: Gimnastični center Ljubljana
- Head coach: Alena Yakubouskaya
- Assistant coach: Alena Salauyova

Aja Jerman Bukavec (born 20 August 1999) is a Slovenian rhythmic gymnast.

== Career ==
=== Junior ===
In the 2014 season, she competed at the World Cup Pesaro and World Cup Lisbon. At the International Tournament in Ljubljana, she won Hoop Final and helped her teammates winning a team gold medal. At the Slovenian National Championships she won All-Around gold medal and made it to the junior team, which competed at the 2014 European Championships in Baku, Azerbaijan.

=== Senior ===
She started competing as a senior at the 2015 International Tournament in Moscow, Russia, where she ended in 15th place All-Around. At the 2015 Slovenian National Championships she won a bronze medal in All-Around competition and qualified to the team for 2015 European Championships in Minsk, Belarus. She competed there only with ribbon, but helped the Slovenian team to 19th place.

In the 2016 season, she competed at the Grand Prix Moscow, Russia and placed 43rd All-Around. At the World Cup Lisbon Aja finished on 8th place All-Around and made it to apparatus finals. She competed at the 2016 Slovenian National Championships and ended on 2nd place All-Around.

== Routine music information ==
Year	Apparatus	Music title
2019	Hoop	Immortelle by Lara Fabian
2019	Ball	unknown
2019	Clubs	We Found Love by Nora En Pure, Ashibah
2019	Ribbon	unknown
2016	Hoop	Perdus by Malena Ernman
2016	Ball	Tango Comparsito by Bilen Yildirir
2016	Clubs	Spain story by Maria Selezneva
2016	Ribbon	Impression by Jan Vayne
2015	Hoop	Perdus by Malena Ernman
2015	Ball	Son Işık by Bilen Yildirir
2015	Clubs	Spain story by Maria Selezneva
2015	Ribbon	Invincible by Thomas J. Bergersen; Two Steps from Hell
