= Monija Čebašek =

Slovenian rhythmic gymnast

- Full name: Monija Čebašek
- Born: Ljubljana, Slovenia

Gymnastics career
- Discipline: Rhythmic gymnastics
- Country represented: Slovenia (2012–present)
- Club: Šiška
- Gym: Dvorana Gimnazije Šentvid
- Head coach: Marina Stoimenova

Monija Čebašek (born 11 April 1998) is a Slovenian rhythmic gymnast.

She competed at three World Championships (2013, 2014, 2015).

== Routine music information ==
Year	Apparatus	Music title
2015	Hoop	Per Te by Josh Groban
2015	Ball	Je t'aime by Lara Fabian
2015	Clubs	The Last Sunday by Ballroom Orchestra & Singers
2015	Ribbon	Cara Mia by Mantovani Orchestra
2014	Hoop	Kung Fu Piano: Cello Ascends by The Piano Guys
2014	Ball	Je t'aime by Lara Fabian
2014	Clubs	Another Cha Cha by Santa Esmeralda
2014	Ribbon	Code Name Vivaldi by The Piano Guys
