= Czechoslovak Rhythmic Gymnastics Championships =

The Czechoslovak Rhythmic Gymnastics Championships was the top sports competition in Czechoslovakia between 1958 and 1992. After the dissolution of Czechoslovakia, the competition continued from 1993 as the Czech Rhythmic Gymnastics Championships and the Slovak Rhythmic Gymnastics Championships.

== Medalists ==
=== All-Around ===
Year	Gold	Silver	Bronze
1958	Dagmar Přívozníková / Alena Toušová		Hana Machatová
1959	Jiřina Machatová	Dagmar Přívozníková	Alena Toušová
1960	Dagmar Štastná	Alena Toušová	Jana Musilová
1961	Dagmar Štastná	Jiřina Machatová	Marie Zdražilová
1962	Dagmar Štastná	Hana Machatová	Jiřina Machatová
1963	Hana Machatová	Jiřina Machatová	Jana Bérová
1964	Dagmar Štastná	Hana Machatová	Jana Bérová
1965	Hana Machatová	Hana Mičechová	Irena Hlaďová
1966	Hana Machatová	Jiřina Machatová	Irena Hlaďová
1967	Zdena Mlynářová	Jiřina Machatová	Irena Hlaďová
1968	Hana Machatová	Jana Vonášková	Irena Hlaďová
1969	Hana Machatová	Jana Vonášková	Julie Pekeländerová
1970	Julie Pekeländerová	Jana Hruzková	Jana Vonášková
1971	Marcela Klingerová	Jana Hruzková	Jana Vonášková
1972	Marcela Klingerová	Iva Zahrádková	Taťjana Mrenová
1973	Marcela Klingerová	Taťjana Mrenová	Alena Baťková
1974	Alena Baťková	Marcela Klingerová	Ivana Kučerová
1975	Marcela Klingerová	Taťjana Mrenová	Hana Kaloudová
1976	Taťjana Mrenová	Zuzana Záveská	Jana Nováková
1977	Iveta Havlíčková	Zuzana Záveská	Hana Kaloudová
1978	Daniela Bošanská / Iveta Havlíčková		Šárka Baťková
1979	Daniela Bošanská	Iveta Havlíčková	Šárka Baťková / Zuzana Záveská
1980	Daniela Bošanská	Šárka Baťková	Iveta Havlíčková
1981	Šárka Baťková	Daniela Bošanská	Zuzana Záveská
1982	Šárka Baťková	Iveta Havlíčková	Daniela Bošanská / Libuše Mojžíšová
1983	Zuzana Záveská	Libuše Mojžíšová	Daniela Záhorovská
1984	Libuše Mojžíšová	Daniela Bošanská	Daniela Záhorovská
1985	Daniela Záhorovská	Jana Zapletalová	Dana Gräfová
1986	Jana Zapletalová	Jolana Dvořáková	Andrea Koppová
1987	Andrea Koppová	Eva Popotrandovská	Denisa Sokolovská
1988	Denisa Sokolovská	Lenka Oulehlová	Andrea Koppová
1989	Lenka Oulehlová	Jana Veselá	Denisa Sokolovská
1990	Lenka Oulehlová	Jana Veselá	Lenka Dědičová
1991	Jana Veselá	Lenka Dědičová	Lenka Oulehlová
1992	Lenka Oulehlová	Jana Veselá	Lenka Dědičová
