= Krassimira Filipova =

Bulgarian rhythmic gymnast

- Красимира Филипова
- Born: 2 February 1949 (age 77) Sofia, Bulgaria

Gymnastics career
- Discipline: Rhythmic gymnastics
- Country represented: Bulgaria (1967-1973)
- Club: Slavia
Medal record
Representing Bulgaria
Rhythmic Gymnastics
World Championships
Silver medal – second place	1971 Havana	Hoop
Silver medal – second place	1973 Rotterdam	Hoop
Bronze medal – third place	1967 Copenhagen	Freehand
Bronze medal – third place	1971 Havana	Rope

Krassimira Filipova (Bulgarian: Красимира Филипова; born 2 February 1949) is a Bulgarian former rhythmic gymnast. In the second half of the 1960s and early 1970s, she won four medals at the World Championships. As a coach, she was the personal trainer of many of the Golden Girls of Bulgaria that dominated the sport in the 1980s.

== Personal life ==
Filipova's father, Zhivko Filipov, was a competitor in artistic gymnastics and also Bulgaria's first jujutsu coach and massage therapist. She has two children, a son and daughter. Her daughter trained in rhythmic gymnastics but had to stop at age 15 after a back injury.

She graduated from the University of National and World Economy and the National Sports Academy "Vasil Levski".

== Career ==
Filipova began training under Julieta Shishmanova in 1959, then moved to Zlatka Parleva. She competed for the Slavia club.

In 1967 she competed at the World Championships held in Copenhagen, where she obtained a bronze medal in the free hands (no apparatus) final and was 7th in the individual all-around event. She went over the allotted time in the free hands event, which cost her the title. Her bronze medal was a tie with Neshka Robeva, and their friendship reportedly began at the event when only Robeva's name was called for the medal ceremony. Robeva protested being given the only medal and attempted to place it around Filipova's neck; in return, she gave it back to Robeva. The event organizers apologized and gave Filipova her own medal.

She did not compete at the 1969 World Championships held in her home country of Bulgaria. However, early the next year, she participated in a Bulgarian gymnastics tour in the United States.

In 1971, at her next World Championships in Havana, she won the silver medal with hoop and the bronze in the rope final, where she was tied with Soviet gymnasts Elena Karpukhina and Alfia Nazmutdinova. She was 4th place in both the individual all-around competition and in the ribbon final.

In the World Championships in Rotterdam in 1973, she was again 4th in the all-around competition and won the silver medal in the hoop final. In addition, she finished in 5th place with ball and 6th with ribbon.

Filipova was a national competitor for 11 years. After she finished her competitive career, she became Robeva's assistant coach for the national team, as position she would hold for 18 years from 1980 to 1998, during the time when the "Golden Girls" of Bulgarian gymnastics dominated the sport. Filipova also became a brevet judge, and until 2016, she was the chairman of the judging committee at the Bulgarian Rhythmic Gymnastics Federation. In addition, she founded a gymnastics club for young children.

As assistant coach, Filipova was the personal trainer for many of the gymnasts on the national team. Elizabeth Koleva recalled Filipova as a demanding but kind and motivating coach who often joked with the gymnasts and attempted to keep them from being overworked.
