= Julia Trashlieva =

Bulgarian rhythmic gymnast (1936–2024)

- Alternative name: Yulia Trashlieva
- Born: 3 February 1936 Ruse, Bulgaria
- Died: 8 May 2024 (aged 88)

Gymnastics career
- Discipline: Rhythmic gymnastics
- Country represented: Bulgaria
- Club: Spartak
- Retired: yes
Medal record
Representing Bulgaria
Rhythmic Gymnastics
World Championships
Bronze medal – third place	1963 Budapest	All-around
Bronze medal – third place	1963 Budapest	Apparatus
Bronze medal – third place	1967 Copenhagen	Group All-around

Julia Trashlieva (Bulgarian: Юлия Трашлиева; 3 February 1936 – 8 May 2024) was a Bulgarian rhythmic and artistic gymnast and coach. She was the all-around bronze medalist at the first World Championships, making her the first Bulgarian rhythmic gymnast to win a World medal, and a member of the Bulgarian group that won bronze in the first ever group competition held in 1967 World Championships in Copenhagen.

== Career ==
Trashlieva competed in both artistic and rhythmic gymnastics. In artistic she won the national title 6 times, and in rhythmic she won 8 national titles from 1956 to 1963. As an artistic gymnast, she competed at the 1961 European Championships and finished in 10th place in the all-around. She also competed at the 1961 Summer Universiade held in Sofia, where she came in second on the uneven bars. She continued to compete in artistic gymnastics through 1962, when she was 73rd at the 1962 World Championships.

She was part of the first Bulgarian national team of rhythmic gymnastics, which competed at the first World Championship in Budapest in 1963. There she won two bronze medals, one in the all-around and one with the hoop. At the 1967 World Championships, she led the Bulgarian group at the first World group competition. They won the bronze medal; the group initially had the highest score, but their score was reduced by half a point because their hoops were found to be slightly larger than regulations allowed.

After finishing her gymnastics career, Trashlieva became a coach. She was one of the coaches of the Bulgarian group that won gold at the 1969 World Championships, and she also coached the group that placed 5th at the 1973 World Championships. She helped create the Bulgarian group routines in both 1967 and 1969.

Trashlieva died on 8 May 2024, at the age of 88.
