= Rumyana Stefanova =

Bulgarian rhythmic gymnast (1945-1978)

- Румяна Стефанова
- Born: 11 August 1945 Varna, Bulgaria
- Died: 16 March 1978 (aged 32) Gabare, near Byala Slatina, Bulgaria

Gymnastics career
- Discipline: Rhythmic gymnastics
- Country represented: Bulgaria; (1965-1971)
- Club: CSKA Sofia
- Retired: yes
Medal record
Representing Bulgaria
World Championships
Gold medal – first place	1971 Havana	Group
Silver medal – second place	1969 Varna	Free-hand
Bronze medal – third place	1967 Copenhagen	Group

Rumyana Stefanova (Bulgarian: Румяна Стефанова; 11 August 1945 – 16 March 1978) was a Bulgarian rhythmic gymnast and coach. She won medals at the World Championships as both an individual and group gymnast and was one of the 1971 World group champions.

== Career ==
Stafanova was initially coached by Dolya Petrova in Varna before later moving to train under Julieta Shishmanova at the club CSKA.

In 1965 she took part in the World Championships in Prague, where she finished 9th place in the all-around.

At the next World Championships in 1967, she was part of the Bulgarian group that won bronze in the final behind Soviet Union and Czechoslovakia.

At the 1969 World Championships in her native Varna, Stefanova was the leader of the Bulgarian team. She won the silver medal in the free-hands (no apparatus) final. She was also fourth in the hoop final and fifth in both the individual all-around and in the rope final. In early 1970, she participated in a Bulgarian gymnastics tour of the United States.

In 1971, she again joined the national senior group. They won gold at the World Championships in Havana.

After her retirement, she became an assistant to Shishmanova, who was the coach of the Bulgarian rhythmic gymnastics team.

On March 16, 1978, she died in a plane crash in a Tu-134 plane on the way to a competition in Poland, along with Shismanova, other officials, and the gymnasts Albena Petrova and Valentina Kirilova. As a tribute to Rumyana Stefanova and Albena Petrova, a rhythmic gymnastics tournament called "Rumi and Albena" has been held in their honor every year since 1997 in Varna.
