= Natalia Ovtchinnikova =

Soviet rhythmic gymnast

- Наталья Анатольевна Овчинникова
- Full name: Natalia Anatolyevna Ovtchinnikova
- Born: 1 January 1948 (age 78) Grozny, Russia

Gymnastics career
- Discipline: Rhythmic gymnastics
- Country represented: Soviet Union (1967-1969)
- Head coach: Nina Silaeva
- Retired: yes
Medal record
Representing Soviet Union
World Championships
Silver medal – second place	1967 Copenhagen	Hoop
Silver medal – second place	1967 Copenhagen	Freehand
Silver medal – second place	1969 Varna	6 Balls

Natalia Ovtchinnikova (born 1 January 1948) is a retired Soviet rhythmic gymnast. She is a multiple Worlds silver medalist both in the individual event and as a group member.

== Biography ==
Natalia was born in Grozny. She subsequently moved to Kyiv, where she now lives.

She is a multiple champion of the USSR. In 1967 she was selected for the World Championships in Copenhagen. She was 4th in the All-Around and won silver with hoop and in the exercise without apparatus. In 1969 she officially became part of the Soviet group and won silver with 6 balls at the World Championships in Varna.
