= Zhanna Vasiura =

Soviet rhythmic gymnast

- Full name: Zhanna Petrivna Vasiura
- Born: 6 February 1954 (age 72) Kiev, Ukrainian SSR, Soviet Union (now - Kyiv, Ukraine)

Gymnastics career
- Discipline: Rhythmic gymnastics
- Country represented: Soviet Union
- Club: Spartak Kiev
- Head coach: Albina Deriugina
- Retired: yes
Medal record
Rhythmic gymnastics
Representing Soviet Union
World Championships
Gold medal – first place	1973 Rotterdam	Group all-around
Silver medal – second place	1971 Havana	Group all-around

Zhanna Petrivna Vasiura (Ukrainian: Жанна Петрівна Васюра, born 6 February 1954) is a Soviet female rhythmic gymnast.

== Career ==
Zhanna Vasiura trained in the local sport club "Spartak Kiev" with her coach Albina Deriugina.

In 1970, Zhanna firstly competed at the USSR Rhythmic Gymnastics Cup, where the Russian coach of rhythmic gymnastics Irina Viner were among participants, without reaching any medal.

Since that competition, she was joined to the Soviet national team, becoming of Albina Deriugina's first notable pupil to compete in international competitions.

In 1971, at the World Championships in Havana, the Soviet group won a silver medal in the group all-around competition.

In 1972, Vasiura represented Ukrainian SSR at the USSR National Championships, winning two silver medals in individual and team all-around competition, and a bronze medal in freehands.

The following year, at the World Championships in Rotterdam, Vasiura with her team won a gold medal in the group all-around event. In that year, she was honored of the Merited Master of Sports of the USSR.

In 1975, Vasiura represented Ukrainian SSR at the 6th Summer Spartakiad of the Peoples of the USSR without reaching any medal.

== Personal life ==
In 1975, Vasiura gratulated from National University of Ukraine on Physical Education and Sport in Kyiv.

In 1976, Zhanna Vasiura was married to the Dynamo Kyiv player, UEFA Cup Winners Cup and UEFA Super Cup winner Leonid Buryak. They have two children - daughter Oksana and son Andrii.
