= East German Rhythmic Gymnastics Championships =

The East German Rhythmic Gymnastics Championship was the most important national rhythmic gymnastics competition in East Germany from 1958 to 1990. Since 1991 it was merged with its West Germany counterpart creating the German Rhythmic Gymnastics Championships.

== Medalists ==
=== Groups ===
Year	Gold	Silver	Bronze
1958	SC DHfK Leipzig		
1959	SC DHfK Leipzig	SG Dynamo Hohenschönhausen	SG Dynamo Dresden
1960	HSG DHfK Leipzig	SG Dynamo Hohenschönhausen	SG Dynamo Dresden
1961	HSG DHfK Leipzig	SG Dynamo Hohenschönhausen	HSG DHfK Leipzig II
1962	HSG DHfK Leipzig	HSG DHfK Leipzig II	HSG Wissenschaft Jena
1963	HSG DHfK Leipzig	SG Dynamo Hohenschönhausen	SG Dynamo Dresden
1976	SC Chemie Halle I	SC Chemie Halle II	SC Leipzig I
1978	SC Chemie Halle I	SC Chemie Halle II	

=== All-Around ===
Year	Gold	Silver	Bronze
1961	Karin Lehmann	Röhting	Ute Lehmann
1962	H. Schannor	Irene Binder	Ute Lehmann
1963	Irene Binder	H. Schannor	Renate Walkstein
1964	Renate Walkstein	Irene Binder	Karin Lehmann
1965	Ute Lehmann	Renate Walkstein	Ingrid Nicklas
1966	Ute Lehmann	Irene Binder	Ingrid Nicklas
1967	Irene Binder	Ute Lehmann	Leubert
1968	Ute Lehmann	Rosemarie Halbritter	Leubert
1969	Ute Lehmann	Rosemarie Halbritter	Streichhahn
1970	Rosemarie Halbritter	Jutta Moritz	Elke Böttger
1971	Jutta Moritz	Bauerschmidt	Hannelore Rühle
1972	Elke Böttger	Jutta Moritz	Susanne Ebert
1973	Elke Böttger	Susanne Ebert	unknown
1974	Susanne Ebert	Heidi Krause	Schwartze
1975	Heidi Krause	Susanne Ebert	Döhring
1976	Barnbeck	Höpfner	Heidi Krause
1977	Ploetz	Höpfner	Heidi Krause
1978	Susanne Ebert	Höpfner	Ploetz
1979	Ploetz	Engelmann	Höpfner
1980	Höpfner	Metscher	Bianca Dittrich
1981	Bianca Dittrich / Petra Loucky	unknown	Katrin Huschke
1982	Bianca Dittrich	Katrin Huschke	Schädlich
1983	Bianca Dittrich	Heidi Krause	Kleinfels
1984	Ines Nausedat	Grübel	Heidi Krause
1985	Heidi Krause	Bianca Dittrich	Pittner
1986	Bianca Dittrich	Esther Nicklas	Pittner
1987	Backert	Kunze	
1988	Kunze	Susann Wegner	Pommerening
1989	Esther Nicklas	Pommerening	Jana Melzian
1990	Silke Neumann	Manuela Renk	Jana Melzian

=== With Apparatus ===
Year	Gold	Silver	Bronze
1961	Karin Lehmann		
1962	H. Schannor		
1963	H. Schannor		
1964	Karin Lehmann	Renate Walkstein	Irene Binder
1965	Ingrid Nicklas	Ute Lehmann	Luft
1966	Ute Lehmann	Ingrid Nicklas	Renate Walkstein
1967	Ute Lehmann	Leubert	Irene Binder
1968	Ute Lehmann	Rosemarie Halbritter	Siegel
1969	Ute Lehmann	Rosemarie Halbritter	Koch
1970	Rosemarie Halbritter	Elke Böttger	Jutta Moritz
1971	Jutta Moritz	Hannelore Rühle	Holtz
1974	Susanne Ebert	Barnbeck	Heidi Krause

=== Without apparatus ===
Year	Gold	Silver	Bronze
1961	Karin Lehmann		
1962	H. Schannor		
1963	Irene Binder		
1964	Irene Binder	Renate Walkstein	Karin Lehmann
1965	Ute Lehmann	Irene Binder	Renate Walkstein
1966	Ute Lehmann	Irene Binder	Ingrid Nicklas
1967	Ute Lehmann	Irene Binder	Streichhahn
1968	Ute Lehmann	Rosemarie Halbritter	Leubert
1969	Ute Lehmann	Rosemarie Halbritter	Irene Binder
1970	Rosemarie Halbritter	Elke Böttger	Streichhahn
1971	Jutta Moritz	Hannelore Rühle	Holtz
1972	Jutta Moritz	Elke Böttger	Schneidewind
1973	Susanne Ebert		Elke Böttger
1974	Schwartze	Susanne Ebert	Heidi Krause
1975	Susanne Ebert		

=== Rope ===
Year	Gold	Silver	Bronze
1976	Höpfner	Barnbeck	Knapp / Porath
1977	Ploetz	Susanne Ebert	Höpfner
1978	Susanne Ebert	Höpfner	Ploetz
1979	Ploetz	Metscher	Höpfner
1980	Metscher / Bianca Dittrich		Höpfner
1981	Huschke	Bianca Dittrich	Loucky
1982	Bianca Dittrich		Kleinfeld / Loucky
1985	Heidi Krause	Bianca Dittrich	Teuber
1986	Esther Nicklas	Bianca Dittrich	Pittner
1987	Kunze	Backert	
1988	Kunze	Wegner	Pommerening
1989	Esther Nicklas	Manuela Renk	Pommerening
1990	Silke Neumann	Manuela Renk / Jana Melzian	

=== Hoop ===
Year	Gold	Silver	Bronze
1972	Jutta Moritz	Elke Böttger	Hannelore Rühle
1973	Susanne Ebert / Elke Böttger		Schneidewind
1975	Susanne Ebert	Krause	Ploetz
1976	Barnbeck	Höpfner	Susanne Ebert
1977	Heidi Krause	Ploetz	Barnbeck
1979	Ploetz	Roesler	Höpfner
1980	Höpfner	Metscher	Bianca Dittrich
1981	Bianca Dittrich	Loucky	Huschke
1982	Schädlich	Bianca Dittrich	Loucky
1983	Heidi Krause	Bianca Dittrich / Huschke	
1984	Grübel	Heidi Krause	Ines Nausedat
1987	Backert	Kunze	
1988	Kunze	Wegner	Rogge
1989	Esther Nicklas	Manuela Renk	Pommerening
1990	Silke Neumann	Jana Melzian	Romy Heymann / Antje Wutschke

=== Ball ===
Year	Gold	Silver	Bronze
1972	Elke Böttger	Jutta Moritz	Schneidewind
1973	Elke Böttger	Schneidewind	Susanne Ebert
1975	Heidi Krause	Schneidewind	Döhring
1976	Susanne Ebert	Heidi Krause	Barnbeck
1977	Heidi Krause	Ploetz	Susanne Ebert
1978	Susanne Ebert	Ploetz	Rösler
1979	Höpfner	Ploetz	Rösler
1983	Bianca Dittrich	Heidi Krause	Huschke
1984	Heidi Krause	Grübel	Ines Nausedat
1985	Bianca Dittrich	Heidi Krause	Pittner
1986	Esther Nicklas / Bianca Dittrich		Pittner
1989	Jana Melzian	Pommerening	Esther Nicklas
1990	Silke Neumann	Romy Heymann	Jana Melzian

=== Clubs ===
Year	Gold	Silver	Bronze
1973	Schneidewind	Elke Böttger	Susanne Ebert
1975	Heidi Krause	Döhring / Susanne Ebert	
1978	Susanne Ebert	Rösler	Ploetz
1979	Ploetz	Engelmann	Rösler
1980	Höpfner	Metscher	Bianca Dittrich
1981	Loucky	Huschke	Heidi Krause
1982	Bianca Dittrich / Huschke		Schädlich
1983	Bianca Dittrich	Heidi Krause	Kleinfeld
1984	Grübel	Ines Nausedat	Heidi Krause
1985	Heidi Krause	Bianca Dittrich	Teuber
1986	Esther Nicklas	Bianca Dittrich	Pittner
1987	Kunze	Backert	
1988	Kunze	Wegner	Pommerening

=== Ribbon ===
Year	Gold	Silver	Bronze
1972	Elke Böttger	Jutta Moritz	Susanne Ebert
1973	Elke Böttger	Susanne Ebert	Barnbeck
1975	Heidi Krause	Susanne Ebert	Ploetz
1976	Höpfner	Heidi Krause	Barnbeck
1977	Susanne Ebert	Ploetz	Heidi Krause / Metscher
1978	Susanne Ebert	Ploetz	Höpfner
1979	Ploetz	Höpfner	Engelmann
1980	Höpfner	Metscher / Bianca Dittrich	
1981	Loucky	Bianca Dittrich	Schädlich
1982	Bianca Dittrich / Huschke		Kleinfeld
1983	Schädlich	Heidi Krause	Bianca Dittrich
1984	Heidi Krause	Grübel	Ines Nausedat
1985	Heidi Krause	Bianca Dittrich	Teuber
1986	Bianca Dittrich	Esther Nicklas	Pittner
1987	Kunze	Backert	
1988	Kunze	Pommerening	Wegner
1989	Manuela Renk	Romy Heymann/ Jana Melzian / Pommerening	
1990	Silke Neumann	Manuela Renk	Jana Melzian
