= Hermann Christian Polster =

German opera singer (born 1937)

Hermann Christian Polster (born 8 April 1937) is a German opera singer (bass).

== Life ==
Born in Leipzig, the son of the concert singer and singing teacher Fritz Polster, he received his first education from his father. He was a member of the Dresdner Kreuzchor. He received his first voice training at the Leipzig University by the musicologist Heinrich Besseler.

Polster began his solo career in Leipzig and soon became an esteemed Bach interpreter. He performed together with the Thomanerchor, whose vocal teacher he was for many years, and made concert tours through Eastern and Western Europe. In addition to Baroque, Classical and Romantic music, he also sang modern works. He was also an esteemed song interpreter. His first opera role was in 1966 as Lord Syndham in Lortzing's Zar und Zimmermann at the Leipzig Opera. Since then he has appeared in many guest roles, as Sarastro in The Magic Flute, as Pogner in the Die Meistersinger von Nürnberg and as Gremin in Eugene Onegin. The main focus of his artistic activity, however, remained primarily on oratorio singing.

Polster was awarded the Kammersänger title and was professor of singing at the University of Music and Theatre Leipzig. In 1978 he was awarded the Art Prize of the German Democratic Republic.

Polster currently educates and professionally profiles young singers with a focus on oratorio and art song.

In 1969, Polster married Ute Lehmann; she was vice world champion in 1967 World Rhythmic Gymnastics Championships. His wife died in 1994.

== Recordings ==
- Franz Schubert: Mass No. 2 for soprano, tenor, bass, choir, string and organ: D 167, Berlin Classics (1998)
