= Rosemarie Halbritter =

East German rhythmic gymnast (1945-2020)

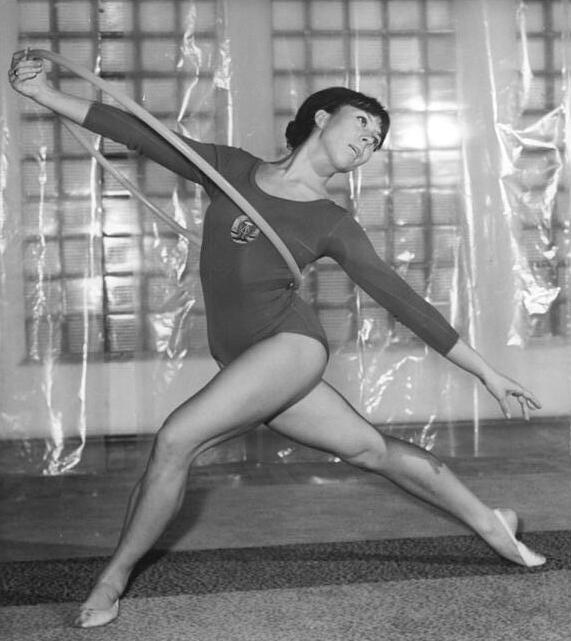

Personal information
- Born: 1945
- Died: 13 April 2020 Colombo, Sri Lanka

Gymnastics career
- Discipline: Rhythmic gymnastics
- Country represented: East Germany
- Club: HSG Wissenschaft PI Zwickau

Rosemarie Halbritter Haubrich (born 1945) was a German rhythmic gymnast who competed for East Germany. She represented her country in international competitions.

== Career ==
Rosemarie made her debut at the 1967 World Championships in Copenhagen, where she was 10th in the All-Around and 4th in the group competition. In the following years she won silver in the All-Around, with the apparatus and in free hands at the East German Championships in 1968 and 1969, being the runner up to Ute Lehmann.

In 1969 she again competed at the World Championships in Varna where she took 13th place in the All-Around. The following year she was crowned national champion overall, with and without the apparatus. She retired shortly after.

After ending her competitive career Rosemarie became a trainer and judge until 2004. At the then SC Chemie Halle she led Susanne Ebert to two national titles, and Bianca Dittrich to win a bronze medal at the 1985 World Championships in Valladolid and gold at Goodwill Games in Moscow. In the mid/late 1980s, she and her husband, a boxing trainer, moved to Berlin initially working, together with gymnastics specialist Barbara Rothenburg, in the Dynamo club in preparation for the GDR gymnastics and sports festival. Later she worked along Rothenburg, who created her own club, from where top gymnasts such as Jana Pagenkopf, Jeanine Fissler, Dara Sajfutdinova and 2004 Olympic competitor Lisa Ingildeeva found their way into the national team. After a sudden relapse of a previous illness, she died on April 13, 2020, in a hospital in Colombo, Sri Lanka.
