= Alfia Nazmutdinova =

Russian rhythmic gymnast (born 1949)

- Full name: Alfia Bilyalovna Nazmutdinova
- Born: 29 April 1949 (age 77) Sverdlovsk, Russian SFSR, Soviet Union

Gymnastics career
- Discipline: Rhythmic gymnastics
- Country represented: Soviet Union
- Head coach: Elizaveta Oblygina
Medal record
Representing Soviet Union
World Championships
Gold medal – first place	1971 Havana	Ribbon
Silver medal – second place	1971 Havana	Ball
Bronze medal – third place	1971 Havana	All-around
Bronze medal – third place	1971 Havana	Rope

Alfia Bilyalovna Nazmutdinova (Russian: Альфия Биляловна Назмутдинова; born 29 April 1949) is a retired rhythmic gymnast who competed for the Soviet Union. She is the 1971 World All-around bronze medalist.

== Early life ==
Alfia Nazmutdinova was born to an ethnic Tatar family as one of four daughters. Her sister, Liliya Nazmutdinova, was a bronze medalist at the 1965 World Rhythmic Gymnastics Championships.

== Career ==
Nazmutdinova began training in rhythmic gymnastics in her hometown of Yekaterinburg. She was influenced by her elder sister, Lilia, a rhythmic gymnast and Honored Master of Sports of the USSR. Her coach was Elizaveta Oblygina, one of the first Soviet Honored coaches in rhythmic gymnastics.

Nazmutdinova won the Cup of the USSR three times. Together with teammate Elena Karpuchina, she competed at the 1971 World Championships in Havana, Cuba, winning bronze in the all-around. At the event finals, she won gold medal in ribbon, a silver in ball and a bronze medal in the rope. She was awarded the title of "Master of Sports" in 1965.

After retiring from competition, Nazmutdinova switched to coaching and teaching.
