= Bianca Dittrich (gymnast) =

East German rhythmic gymnast (born 1967)

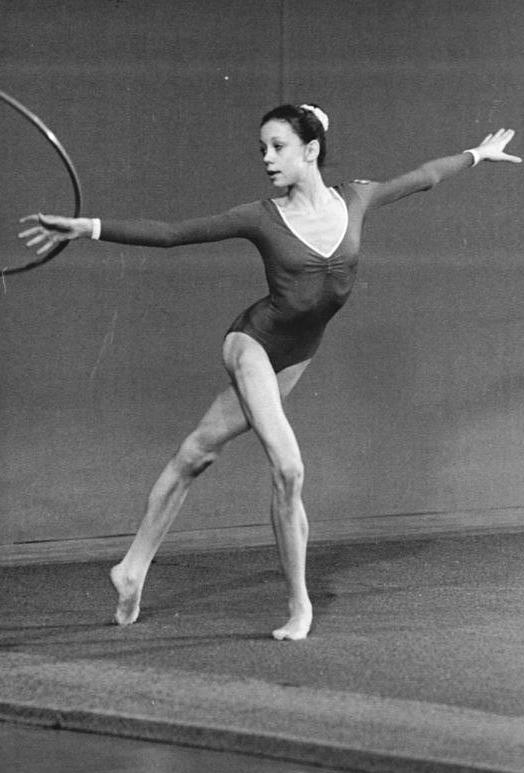

Personal information
- Born: January 3, 1967 (age 59) Magdeburg, East Germany

Gymnastics career
- Discipline: Rhythmic gymnastics
- Country represented: East Germany; (1980-1987)
- Club: SC Chemie Halle
- Head coach: Rosemarie Halbritter
- Retired: yes
Medal record
Representing East Germany
World Championships
Bronze medal – third place	1985 Valladolid	Ball
Goodwill Games
Gold medal – first place	1986 Moscow	Rope
Bronze medal – third place	1986 Moscow	Ribbon

Bianca Cogel-Dittrich (born 3 January 1967) is a retired German rhythmic gymnast who represented East Germany. She is the 1985 World all-around bronze medalist and won gold in the rope final at the 1986 Goodwill Games.

== Career ==
Dittrich made her debut in 1980, when she won bronze in the all-around, with hoop and with clubs, silver with ribbon and gold with rope at the East German Championships. In 1981 she tied with Petra Loucky for the national all-around title, and in the event finals, she won gold with hoop and silver with rope and ribbon. That year, she took part in the World Championships in Munich, taking 19th place overall.

At the 1982 European Championships in Stavanger, she was 12th in the all-around and 5th with clubs. At nationals she won the all-around, rope, clubs and ribbon gold medals as well as silver with hoop.

The following year, at the East German Championships, she retained her all-around, ball and clubs titles, and she also won silver with hoop and bronze with ball. Competing at the first World Cup in Belgrade, she finished 10th overall. At the World Championships in Strasbourg, she was 7th in the all-around and 8th in the ball final.

In 1985 she was selected for the World Championships in Valladolid. There, she was 5th in the all-around and with rope, 6th with clubs and 8th with ribbon. She won bronze in the ball final. At the East German Championships, she was the all-around silver medalist, a result she repeated with rope, clubs and ribbon, and she won gold with ball.

In 1986, she was 64th at the European Championships in Florence after she competed only two routines, in which she dropped her rope and lost her ball from the floor area. After this, she withdrew due to an injury. That same year, she won another national all-around title, along with silver with rope and clubs and gold with ball and ribbon. Dittrich also won bronze with ribbon and gold with rope at the 1986 Goodwill Games in Moscow.

Although she wanted to try to compete in the 1988 Summer Olympics, she retired in 1987 for health reasons. After her competitive career ended, she had a son and worked in theatre.
