= 1963 World Rhythmic Gymnastics Championships =

- Location: Budapest, Hungary
- Start date: 7 December 1963
- End date: 8 December 1963

I World Rhythmic Gymnastics Championships were held in Budapest, Hungary on 7 and 8 December 1963.

Each country could send up to three gymnasts. Gymnasts performed two routines - freehand (no apparatus) and with apparatus. The apparatus was not specified; those used included hoops, balls, and pairs of handheld streamers.

== Participants ==
There were 28 competitors from 10 countries: Czechoslovakia, Soviet Union, Bulgaria, Hungary, Finland, German Democratic Republic, Romania, Poland, Spain and Yugoslavia.

Nation	Name	Nation	Name	Nation	Name	Nation	Name
(Soviet Union)	Ludmila Savinkova	(Czechoslovakia)	Dagmar Šťastná	(Poland)	Krystyna Szczepanska	(Finland)	Rauni Koskinen
(Soviet Union)	Tatiana Kravtchenko	(East Germany)	Irene Binder	(Poland)	Czeslava Walenczij	(Romania)	Iliena Josif Olareu
(Bulgaria)	Julia Trashlieva	(Hungary)	Maya Tonay	(Finland)	Tuula Launala	(East Germany) '	Ute Lehmann
(Soviet Union)	Elvira Averkovics	(Romania)	Daniela Diaconescu	(Socialist Federal Republic of Yugoslavia)	? Novicic	(Bulgaria)	? Lismanova
(Czechoslovakia)	Hana Machatová-Bogušovská	(Poland)	Maria Paszynin	(Socialist Federal Republic of Yugoslavia)	Tatiana Radovanovic	(Hungary)	Maria Patocska
(Czechoslovakia)	Jana Bérová	(Bulgaria)	Violetta Baptisca	(Spain)	Isabel Benavente	(Romania)	Mihael Solomolov
(East Germany)	Renate Walkstein	(Hungary)	Orsolya Szabo	(Spain)	Rosa Ascaso	(Spain)	Rosa Jiménez

== Medal table ==
Place	Country	Gold	Silver	Bronze	Total
1	Soviet Union	3	3	1	7
2	Bulgaria	0	0	2	2

== Individual ==
=== Freehand ===
Place	Name	Nation	Score
1	Ludmila Savinkova	(Soviet Union)	9.633
2	Tatiana Kravtchenko	(Soviet Union)	9.600
3	Elvira Averkovics	(Soviet Union)	9.433
4	Julia Trashlieva	(Bulgaria)	9.400
5	Julieta Shishmanova	(Bulgaria)	9.333
=	Hana Machatová-Bogušovská	(Czechoslovakia)	9.333

=== Apparatus ===
Place	Name	Nation	Score
1	Ludmila Savinkova	(Soviet Union)	9.600
2	Tatiana Kravtchenko	(Soviet Union)	9.566
3	Julia Trashlieva	(Bulgaria)	9.533
4	Hana Machatová-Bogušovská	(Czechoslovakia)	9.366
5	Jana Bérová	(Czechoslovakia)	9.300
6	Elvira Averkovics	(Soviet Union)	9.266
=	Maria Patocska	(Hungary)	9.266
=	Dagmar Šťastná	(Czechoslovakia)	9.266
=	Renate Walkstein	(East Germany)	9.266

=== All-Around ===
Place	Name	Nation	Freehand	Apparatus	Total
1	Ludmila Savinkova	(Soviet Union)	9.633	9.600	19.233
2	Tatiana Kravtchenko	(Soviet Union)	9.600	9.566	19.166
3	Julia Trashlieva	(Bulgaria)	9.400	9.533	18.933
4	Elvira Averkovics	(Soviet Union)	9.433	9.266	18.699
=	Hana Machatová-Bogušovská	(Czechoslovakia)	9.333	9.366	18.699
6	Jana Bérová	(Czechoslovakia)	9.266	9.300	18.566
=	Renate Walkstein	(East Germany)	9.300	9.266	18.566
8	Maria Patocska	(Hungary)	9.266	9.266	18.532
9	Rauni Koskinen	(Finland)	9.300	9.200	18.500
10	Ute Lehmann	(East Germany)	9.300	9.066	18.366
=	Dagmar Šťastná	(Czechoslovakia)	9.100	9.266	18.366
12	Irene Binder	(East Germany)	9.133	9.200	18.333
=	Maya Tonay	(Hungary)	9.233	9.100	18.333
14	Daniela Diaconescu	(Romania)	9.166	9.100	18.266
15	Maria Paszynin	(Poland)	9.166	9.066	18.232
16	Violetta Baptisca	(Bulgaria)	9.133	9.066	18.199
17	Orsolya Szabo	(Hungary)	9.000	9.166	18.166
18	Mihael Solomolov	(Romania)	9.133	9.000	18.133
19	Iliena Josif Olareu	(Romania)	8.866	9.200	18.066
20	? Lismanova	(Bulgaria)	9.333	8.700	18.033
21	Krystyna Szczepanska	(Poland)	9.033	8.900	17.933
22	Czeslava Walenczij	(Poland)	9.100	8.800	17.900
23	Tuula Launala	(Finland)	8.900	8.800	17.700
24	Ljuba Novicic	(Socialist Federal Republic of Yugoslavia)	8.766	8.933	17.699
25	Tatiana Radovanovic	(Socialist Federal Republic of Yugoslavia)	8.700	8.733	17.433
26	Isabel Benavente	(Spain)	8.366	8.700	17.066
27	Rosa Ascaso	(Spain)	8.266	8.666	16.932
28	Rosa Jiménez	(Spain)	8.133	8.400	16.533
