= Leonid Buryak =

Ukrainian footballer and coach

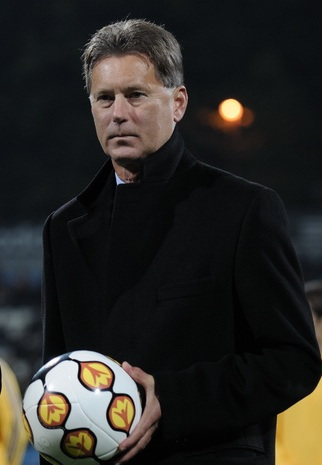

Personal information
- Full name: Leonid Yosipovich Buryak
- Date of birth: 10 July 1953 (age 73)
- Place of birth: Odesa, Ukrainian SSR
- Height: 1.82 m (5 ft 11 1/2 in)
- Position: Midfielder

Youth career
- 1963–1966: Prodmash, Odesa
- 1966–1968: Sport School No. 6
- 1968–1971: FC Chornomorets Odesa

Senior career*
Years	Team	Apps	(Gls)
1971–1972	Chornomorets Odesa	52	(9)
1973–1984	Dynamo Kyiv	304	(56)
1985–1986	Torpedo Moscow	37	(2)
1987–1988	Metalist	36	(4)
1988-1989	KPT-85		(2)
1990	VanPa	12	(0)

International career
1974–1983	USSR	49	(8)

Managerial career
- 1988–1989: KPT-85
- 1990: VanPa
- 1991–1993: University of Evansville
- 1993: Nyva Ternopil
- 1994–1998: Chornomorets Odesa
- 1996–2000: Ukraine (assistant)
- 1999: Arsenal Tula
- 2002–2003: Ukraine
- 2005: Dynamo Kyiv
- 2005–2007: Dynamo Kyiv (sporting director)
- 2012: Oleksandriya
Medal record
Representing Soviet Union
Men's Football
Bronze medal – third place	1976 Montreal	Team competition
UEFA European U-23 Championships
Runner-up	1972 Europe
- * Club domestic league appearances and goals

Leonid Yosipovich Buryak (Ukrainian: Леонід Йосипович Буряк; born 10 July 1953) is a Ukrainian football coach, and a former Olympic bronze-medal-winning player.

== Career ==
Buryak was born in Odesa, in the Soviet Union. He was a midfielder for the USSR national football team. He competed for the Soviet Union at the 1976 Summer Olympics, at which he won a bronze medal.

Buryak played for a number of teams in the Soviet Union, most notably for Dynamo Kyiv, of which he was also the sporting manager. As a player, he had a tremendous impact on his team, similar to what Pavel Nedvěd or Zinedine Zidane had on theirs. Buryak has coached the Ukraine national football team.

In 1979 Buryak played couple of games for Ukraine at the Spartakiad of the Peoples of the USSR.

=== Coach of Ukraine national team ===
In 2002, Leonid Buryak was appointed coach of the Ukraine national team. Making this choice, the Football Federation set the target for the new coach to get into the final part of the 2004 European Championship. The preparation for the main matches began with the defeat of the Japanese team in the first match for Buryak-coach.

As part of the qualifying tournament, the Ukrainian team managed to play with a score of 2-2 in Yerevan in the first match, then there was a significant victory over the Greek team. However, Buryak's team, which took the final third place in the qualifying round, failed to enter into the final part of the championship. Leonid Buryak left the national team.

== Awards ==
=== Ballon d'Or ===
- 1975 – 23rd

=== Soviet Footballer of the Year ===
- 1981 – 3rd.

=== Grigory Fedotov Club ===
- Scored 103 goals during their professional career.

== Statistics for Dynamo ==
Club	Season	League		Cup		Europe		Super Cup		Total	
Club	Season	Apps	Goals	Apps	Goals	Apps	Goals	Apps	Goals	Apps	Goals
Dynamo	1973	26	2	9	0	6	2	-	-	41	4
Dynamo	1974	29	5	5	1	6	1	-	-	40	7
Dynamo	1975	25	0	1	0	8	2	-	-	34	2
Dynamo	1976 (s)	5	0	1	0	-	-	-	-	6	0
Dynamo	1976 (a)	13	4	-	-	8	3	-	-	21	7
Dynamo	1977	26	5	2	0	2	0	1	0	31	5
Dynamo	1978	24	5	8	4	3	1	-	-	35	10
Dynamo	1979	26	5	6	1	6	1	-	-	38	7
Dynamo	1980	28	9	7	5	1	1	-	-	36	15
Dynamo	1981	29	9	7	0	5	1	1	0	42	10
Dynamo	1982	21	3	2	1	4	2	-	-	27	6
Dynamo	1983	28	6	1	0	2	0	-	-	31	6
Dynamo	1984	24	3	2	0	-	-	-	-	26	3
Total		304	56	51	12	51	14	2	0	408	82

- The statistics in USSR Cups and Europe is made under the scheme "autumn-spring" and enlisted in a year of start of tournaments

== Personal life ==
His father died early. Mother raised three children on her own.

He is married to Zhanna Vasiura, an rhythmic gymnast. They have two children - daughter Oksana and son Andrei.
