= Victoria Vîlcu Buruiană =

Romanian gymnast, coach and judge in rhythmic gymnastics

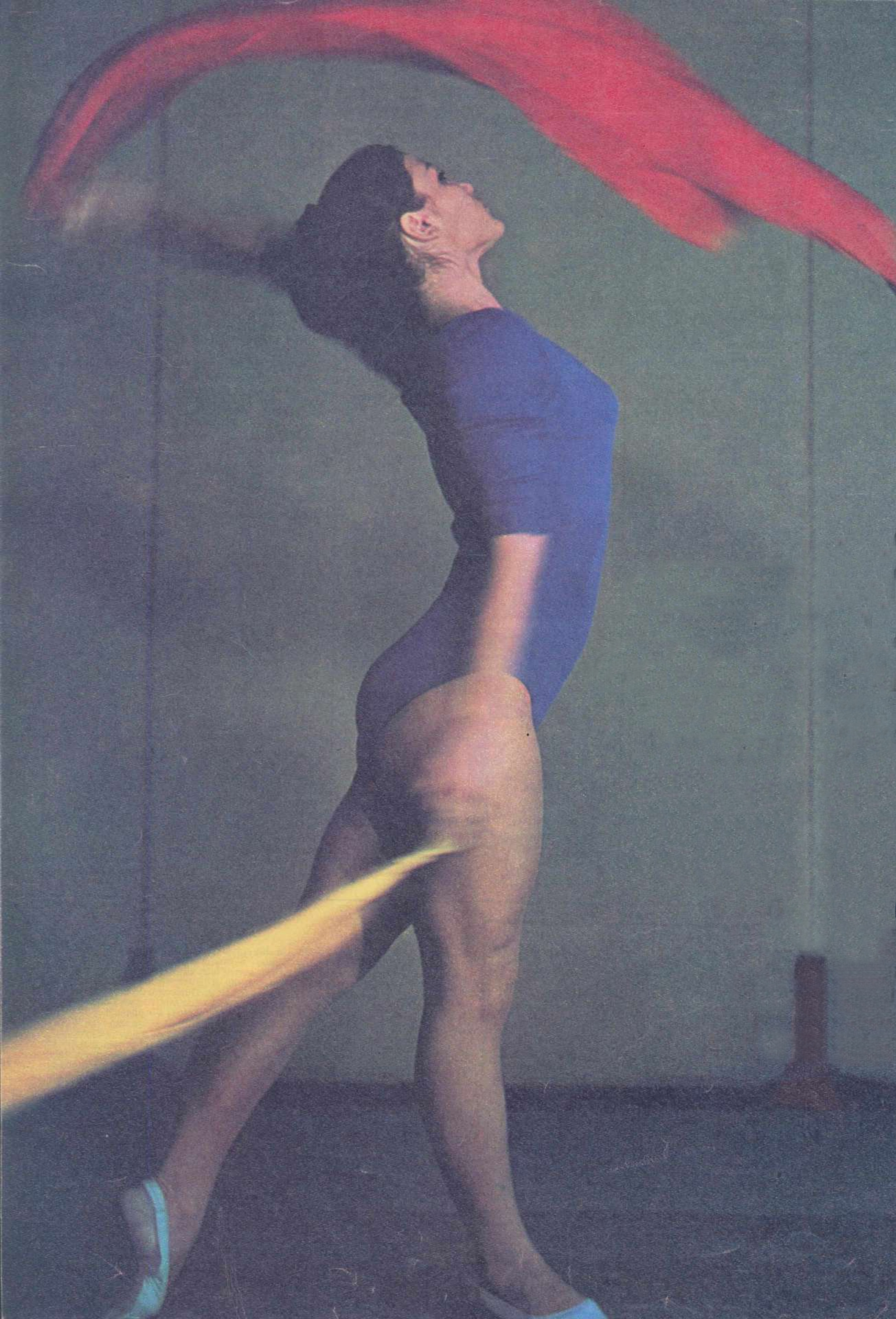
- Born: Victoria Vîlcu; 1947; Romania
- Died: 1988 (aged 40–41); Prince Albert, Saskatchewan, Canada
- Citizenship: Romanian
- Years active: 1968-1984
- Known for: Pioneer of rhythmic gymnastics in Romania, coach and judge
- Spouse: Mihai Buruiană (m. 1979)
- Children: 1

Victoria Vîlcu Buruiană (1947-1988) was a Romanian rhythmic gymnast, coach and judge. She was one of the pioneers of Romania's rhythmic gymnastics.

== Biography ==
In December 1968, Vîlcu won gold in the All-Around and all the finals at the international friendly match between the University of Bucharest and Slavia Sofia. In 1969 she won the first Cup of Romania. Later that year she competed along Iulia Murmurache and Mihaela Nicolaescu at the World Championships in Varna, the first time Romania competed in that event, taking 11th place in the All-Around.

After her retirement from the sport she became a coach, for CSS Triumf, and a judge who refereed at the highest level. She trained Lori Fung during her training camp in Romania, Fung later became the first Olympic champion in rhythmic gymnastics in Los Angeles 1984 where Vîlcu was a judge.

In 1979 she married Mihai Buruiană, together they had a daughter Miruna. The family emigrated to Canada in 1988, she died due to illness in Prince Albert.
