= Tatiana Kravtchenko =

Soviet rhythmic gymnast

- Full name: Tatiana Viktorovna Kravtchenko (Molchanova)
- Born: 1936 or 13 June 1940 Moscow, Russian SFSR, Soviet Union
- Died: 25 May 2016 (aged 75–80) Moscow, Russia

Gymnastics career
- Discipline: Rhythmic gymnastics
- Country represented: Soviet Union
- Head coach: Maria Lisitzian
- Assistant coach: Tamara Vartanova
Medal record
Representing Soviet Union
World Championships
Gold medal – first place	1965 Prague	Freehands
Gold medal – first place	1967 Copenhagen	Group All-around
Silver medal – second place	1963 Budapest	All-around
Silver medal – second place	1963 Budapest	Apparatus
Silver medal – second place	1963 Budapest	Freehands
Silver medal – second place	1965 Prague	All-around
Silver medal – second place	1965 Prague	Apparatus

Tatiana Viktorovna Kravtchenko (Russian: Татьяна Викторовна Кравченко; 1936 or 13 June 1940 – 25 May 2016) was a rhythmic gymnast who competed for the Soviet Union. She was a two-time (1963, 1965) World all-around silver medalist and was a member of the Soviet group that won the first-ever World group title, held at the 1967 World Championships. She was an Honored Master of Sports in rhythmic gymnastics.

== Career ==
Tatiana Kravtchenko, a statuesque blonde, was one of the pioneers of rhythmic gymnastics in the 1960s. She competed at the first World Championships held in Budapest, winning the individual All-around silver medal. She won another silver medal in All-around at the 1965 World Championships.

Group exercises debuted on the World stage at the 1967 World Championships in Copenhagen. Kravtchenko and Ludmila Savinkova were among the six gymnasts in the Soviet team for Group Exercise and won the gold medal, marking the beginning of the Soviet rhythmic gymnastics school's international successes. Both Savinkova and Kravtchenko were coached by Tamara Lisitzian, and later on, by her sister Maria Lisitzian.

Throughout her career, Kravtchenko remained faithful to the Soviet classical style and music. Her best known routine was the one without hand apparatus to "Russian theme" music. It brought her the world gold medal in Freehands on this piece at the 1965 World Championships in Prague.

== Personal life ==
Kravtchenko finished her education at the High Institute for Physical Culture in Moscow. She then earned a degree at the High Institute for Arts.

Kravtchenko died on 25 May 2016 in Moscow.
