= Hana Mičechová =

Czech rhythmic gymnast (1946–2020)

- Full name: Hana Sitnianská-Mičechová
- Born: 25 January 1946 Prague, Czechoslovakia
- Died: 11 December 2020 (aged 74) Prague

Gymnastics career
- Discipline: Rhythmic gymnastics
- Country represented: Czechoslovakia
- Head coach: Květa Černá
Medal record
Representing Czechoslovakia
World Championships
Gold medal – first place	1965 Prague	All-around
Gold medal – first place	1965 Prague	Apparatus
Gold medal – first place	1967 Copenhagen	Rope
Bronze medal – third place	1965 Prague	Freehands

Hana Sitnianská-Mičechová (25 January 1946, Prague – 11 December 2020, Prague) was a Czech rhythmic gymnast. She was the 1965 World individual all-around Champion.

== Biography ==
Mičechová was born in Prague. At the 1965 World Championships, with 12 countries competing, she competed in front of a home crowd in Prague and won the All-around and Apparatus events, beating Soviets Ludmila Savinkova and Tatiana Kravtchenko.
