= Isabel Benavente =

Spanish rhythmic gymnast

Isabel Benavente, is a former Spanish rhythmic gymnast.

== History ==
The origin of Spanish rhythmic gymnastics in terms of high competition came from the Julio Ruiz de Alda Higher School of Female Physical Education, the Almudena in Madrid. Isabel Benavente, Rosa Ascaso and Rosa Jiménez participated in the World Championship in Budapest in 1963. In 1974, the Spanish Gymnastics Federation, chaired by Félix Fernández, created the national rhythmic gymnastics team to be able to participate in the World Championship. World of Madrid in 1975 and in the European Championship of Madrid in 1978. The first national selector was the Bulgarian Ivanka Tchakarova. She held that position from 1974 to 1978, and was helped as coaches by Carmen Algora and, at first, also by Teresa de Isla. At first they trained at the National Sports Delegation, later moving to the Moscardó Gymnasium in Madrid. In 1975, the first Spanish Rhythmic Gymnastics Championships was held, and in November, the World Championship in Madrid, which was a resounding success for Spanish rhythmic gymnastics, achieving six medals in both group and individual modalities. In 1979, Tchakarova was relieved as coach by the Bulgarian Meglena Atanasova, who would remain until 1981. At that time, María José Rodríguez would be the individual coach, accompanied in 1980 and 1981 by Tchakarova; and from 1979 to 1980 Aurora Fernández del Valle would be the group's coach, in addition to being the period in which Georgi Neykov arrived as choreographer.

== Career ==
Benavente was a member of the Women's Committee of the Royal Spanish Gymnastics Federation (FEG) since 1962. She participated in the first rhythmic gymnastics world championship in Budapest in December 1963, along with other Spanish women such as Rosa Ascaso and Rosa Jiménez. In the exercises both with the apparatus and free hands, Isabel Benavente was in 27th place with less than 28 participants, also in the individual competition.

== Result in international competition ==
Budapest 1963: 27th in freehands (8,266), 27th with apparatus (8,666), 27th in the All-Around (16,932 points)
