= Hana Machatová-Bogušovská =

Czech rhythmic gymnast (born 1938)

Hana Bogušovská
- Full name: Hana Machatová-Bogušovská
- Born: 31 July 1938 (age 88) Brno, Czechoslovakia

Gymnastics career
- Discipline: Rhythmic gymnastics
- Country represented: Czechoslovakia
- Head coach: Květa Černá
Medal record
Representing Czechoslovakia
World Championships
Silver medal – second place	1965 Prague	Freehands
Bronze medal – third place	1965 Prague	All-around

Hana Machatová-Bogušovská (born 31 July 1938) is a retired Czech rhythmic gymnast. She is the 1965 World individual all-around silver medalist and three times Czech champion (1963, 1965, 1966). Her twin, Jiřina Machatová, is also a very successful gymnast and ballet dancer. Now she is a coach of young rhythmic gymnasts in Czech Republic.

== Biography ==
Machatová was born in Brno and competed in three World Championships. She made her first appearance at the 1963 World Championships in Budapest, Hungary finishing 4th in all-around. At the 1965 World Championships, with 12 countries competing, she competed in front of a home country crowd in Prague where she won bronze in All-around and silver in Freehands. She competed in her last Worlds at the 1967 World Championships finishing 6th in all-around.

After her retirement, Machatová-Bogušovská was a soloist ballerina from years 1957-1982 of the ballet company of the State Theatre in Brno, she was also an external teacher and lecturer at Masaryk University and the Janáček Academy of Performing Arts. In 2012, she was the Chair of the South Moravian region in rhythmic gymnastics. In 1976, she married Vlastimil Bubník
