= 1971 World Rhythmic Gymnastics Championships =

- Location: Havana, Cuba
- Start date: 10 November 1971
- End date: 11 November 1971

The V World Rhythmic Gymnastics Championships, also known as the Modern Gymnastics World Championships, were held in Havana, Cuba on 10–11 November, 1971.

This was the first year that the ribbon was used as an official apparatus. The ribbon routine was compulsory.

== Competitors ==
There were competitors from 15 countries: Bulgaria, Soviet Union, Cuba, Hungary, Czechoslovakia, North Korea, Romania, Japan, New Zealand, Denmark, West Germany, Canada, Mexico, Sweden and Italy. This was the first time that Canada or Mexico had competed at the world Championships.

== Medal table ==
Rank	Nation	Gold	Silver	Bronze	Total
1	Bulgaria (BUL)	4	2	2	8
2	Soviet Union (URS)	1	5	4	10
3	North Korea (PRK)	1	1	0	2
4	Italy (ITA)	0	0	1	1
Totals (4 entries)		6	8	7	21

== Individuals ==
=== Ribbon ===
Place	Nation	Name	All-Around	Ribbon Final	Total
1	(Soviet Union)	Alfia Nazmutdinova	9.350	9.550	18.900
2	(Soviet Union)	Elena Karpuchina	9.300	9.500	18.800
3	(Soviet Union)	Galima Shugurova	9.150	9.600	18.750
4	(Bulgaria)	Krassimira Filipova	9.100	9.350	18.450
5	(Cuba)	Sonia Pedroso	9.000	9.150	18.150
6	(Bulgaria)	Maria Gigova	9.200	8.500	17.700

=== Rope ===
Place	Nation	Name	All-Around	Rope Final	Total
1	(Bulgaria)	Maria Gigova	9.750	9.750	19.500
2	(Bulgaria)	Neshka Robeva	9.600	9.650	19.250
3=	(Bulgaria)	Krassimira Filipova	9.500	9.600	19.100
3=	(Soviet Union)	Elena Karpuchina	9.600	9.500	19.100
3=	(Soviet Union)	Alfia Nazmutdinova	9.500	9.600	19.100
6	(Soviet Union)	Galina Shugurova	9.300	9.400	18.700

=== Ball ===
Place	Nation	Name	All-Around	Ball Final	Total
1	(North Korea)	Sun Duk Jo	9.450	9.500	18.950
2=	(Soviet Union)	Alfia Nazmutdinova	9.450	9.450	18.900
2=	(Soviet Union)	Galima Shugurova	9.400	9.500	18.900
2=	(North Korea)	Myong Sim Choi	9.500	9.400	18.900
5	(Soviet Union)	Elena Karpuchina	9.450	9.400	18.850
6	(Bulgaria)	Maria Gigova	9.450	9.350	18.800

=== Hoop ===
Place	Nation	Name	All-Around	Hoop Final	Total
1	(Bulgaria)	Maria Gigova	9.750	9.750	19.500
2	(Bulgaria)	Krassimira Filipova	9.600	9.750	19.350
3	(Bulgaria)	Neshka Robeva	9.650	9.400	19.050
4	(Soviet Union)	Elena Karpuchina	9.500	9.450	18.950
5	(North Korea)	Sun Duk Jo	9.450	9.400	18.850
6	(Soviet Union)	Alfia Nazmutdinova	9.400	9.300	18.700

=== All-Around ===
Place	Nation	Name	Ribbon	Rope	Ball	Hoop	Total
1	(Bulgaria)	Maria Gigova	9.200	9.750	9.450	9.750	38.150
2	(Soviet Union)	Elena Karpuchina	9.300	9.600	9.450	9.500	37.850
3	(Soviet Union)	Alfia Nazmutdinova	9.350	9.500	9.450	9.400	37.700
4	(Bulgaria)	Krassimira Filipova	9.100	9.500	9.350	9.600	37.550
5	(Bulgaria)	Neshka Robeva	?	9.600	?	9.650	37.500
6	(Soviet Union)	Galima Shugurova	9.150	9.300	9.400	9.300	37.150
7	(Cuba)	Sonia Pedroso	9.000	?	?	?	36.250
8	(Hungary)	Maria Patocska	?	?	?	?	36.050
9	(Cuba)	Ivelisse Blanco	?	?	?	?	35.850
10	(Czech Republic)	Jana Vonášková	?	?	?	?	35.800
11	(Czech Republic)	Marcela Klingerová	?	?	?	?	35.700
12	(North Korea)	Myong Sim Kim	?	?	?	?	35.550
13	(Czech Republic)	Jana Hruzková	?	?	?	?	35.500
14	(Romania)	Maria Preda	?	?	?	?	35.300
15=	(Hungary)	Maria Bogaras	?	?	?	?	35.200
15=	(North Korea)	Sun Duk Jo	?	?	9.450	9.450	35.200
17	(North Korea)	Myong Sim Choi	?	?	9.500	?	35.050
18	(Romania)	Carmen Bucaciuc	?	?	?	?	34.950
19=	(Cuba)	Xiomara Ameller	?	?	?	?	34.800
19=	(Hungary)	Agnes Varga	?	?	?	?	34.800
21	(Japan)	Taeko Kawamukai	?	?	?	?	34.200
22	(Japan)	Misako Gomei	?	?	?	?	34.100
23	(Japan)	Kinuyo Kobayashi	?	?	?	?	33.750
24	(New Zealand)	Dale Scandrett	?	?	?	?	33.000
25	(Denmark)	Vivian Persson	?	?	?	?	32.850
26	(Germany)	Gisela Arkenberg	?	?	?	?	32.800
27	(Denmark)	Lone Broberg Teglers	?	?	?	?	32.650
28=	(Germany)	Ute Barylla	?	?	?	?	32.500
28=	(Germany)	Sabine Wasmuth	?	?	?	?	32.500
30	(Denmark)	Jytte Ulbrandt-Hansen	?	?	?	?	32.400
31	(New Zealand)	Marian Duncan	?	?	?	?	31.300
32	(New Zealand)	Katrina Mackintosh	?	?	?	?	31.000
33	(Canada)	Susan Mihkelson	?	?	?	?	28.800
34	(Canada)	Conny Lindenberger	?	?	?	?	28.550
35	(Canada)	Melony Jvy	?	?	?	?	28.050
36	(Mexico)	Lidia Romero	?	?	?	?	22.950
37	(Mexico)	Leticia Gonzalez	?	?	?	?	22.600
38	(Mexico)	Rosa Maria Gonzalez	?	?	?	?	22.400
-	(Sweden)	Eva Ericson^	-	-	-	-	-

^ did not start

== Groups ==
Place	Nation	Score
1	Bulgaria	18.675
2	Soviet Union	18.575
3	Italy	18.325
4	Cuba	18.200
5	Japan	18.175
6	North Korea	18.050
7	(Czech Republic) Czechoslovakia	17.350
8	Canada	15.800
9	Mexico	11.900
