= Elena Karpukhina =

Soviet rhythmic gymnast

- Full name: Elena Alekseevna Karpukhina
- Born: 21 March 1951 (age 75) Moscow, Russia

Gymnastics career
- Discipline: Rhythmic gymnastics
- Country represented: Soviet Union
- Head coach: Maria Lisitzian
- Assistant coaches: Tamara Vartanova, Maria Lisitzian
Medal record
Representing Soviet Union
World Championships
Gold medal – first place	1967 Copenhagen	All-around
Silver medal – second place	1967 Copenhagen	Rope
Silver medal – second place	1967 Copenhagen	Hoop
Silver medal – second place	1971 Havana	All-around
Silver medal – second place	1971 Havana	Ribbon
Bronze medal – third place	1971 Havana	Rope

Elena Alekseevna Karpukhina (Russian: Елена Алексеевна Карпухина; born 21 March 1951 in Moscow) is a retired rhythmic gymnast who competed for the Soviet Union. She is the 1967 World All-around champion and 1971 World All-around silver medalist.

== Personal life ==
Karpukhina was born in Butyrka prison, in Moscow where her mother Ludmila Bulatova was serving a sentence after being convicted in the late 1940s. She spent the first two years of her childhood living in prison with her mother, who was pardoned in 1953.

== Career ==
Karpukhina took up ballet at nine years of age and started rhythmic gymnastics training in 1962. She was coached by Tamara Vartanova and Maria Lisitzian who also coached other Soviet stars such as Ludmila Savinkova and Tatiana Kravtchenko. She won the 1967 World Championships in All-around at 16 years of age and became the second soviet RG to win the All-around, she won the silver medal in hoop and rope. In the 1967–1973, she repeatedly won USSR Cup and International RG Tournaments. She returned at the 1971 World Championships and won the silver medal in All-around behind Bulgarian star Maria Gigova, she also won silver in ribbon and bronze in rope. At her very last competition, the Moscow RG Cup, Karpukhina was pregnant with her daughter Nadezda.

In 1972 she graduated from the State Central Order of Lenin Institute of Physical Culture as a rhythmic gymnastics instructor and physical therapist. In 1976, she became a coach in a number of sports associations of the USSR. In 1982–1995, she took up physical therapy at the Institute of Rheumatology and boarding schools for orphans and children with disabilities. Since 1995 she began teaching in additional education in the secondary school number 397 in Moscow.

She became a member of the Communist Party of the Russian Federation in 1998. She later ran as a candidate in the Moscow City Duma. The Communist Party submitted her name as a candidate for deputy of the State Duma of the Russian Federation in 2003.

April 12, 2011 Karpukhina transferred all her medals to the Butyrka museum

== Achievements ==
- She levels with Alina Kabaeva as one of the youngest rhythmic gymnast to win the All-around World Championships at 16 years of age until Yana Kudryavtseva of the Russian Federation broke the record winning the All-around 2013 World Championships at 15 years of age.
