= Jiřina Machatová =

Czech rhythmic gymnast

- Full name: Jiřina Machatová-Langová
- Born: 31 July 1938 (age 88) Brno, Czechoslovakia
- Spouse: Zdeněk Lang

Gymnastics career
- Discipline: Rhythmic gymnastics
- Country represented: Czechoslovakia (1958–1967)
- Retired: 1967

Jiřina Machatová-Langová (born 31 July 1938) is a retired Czech rhythmic gymnast and ballet dancer. She was the 1959 All-Around national champion in rhythmic gymnastics.

== Biography ==
Jiřina and her twin Hana are the daughters of former goalkeeper of SK Židenice Oldřich Machat. She has been involved in rhythmic gymnastics since 1955, in 1959 Jiřina became the absolute champion of the Czech Republic, and in the following five years she added five more titles in apparatus finals. In 1965 she became master of sports and merited master of sports two years later. In 1967 she was selected for the World Championships in Copenhagen, taking 10th place in the All-Around. Both sisters then ended their sport career and in addition to their engagement in the theatre, they devoted themselves to coaching young athletes.

Both twins graduated in 1957 from the dance conservatory in Brno, and after her retirement, Machatová was a soloist ballerina from years 1957-1981 of the ballet company of the State Theatre of Brno along her sister.

Jiřina married Zdeněk Lang on 2 October 1965 in a joint ceremony with Hana and her fiancée, the couple had two children: Hanne and Radek. In 2018, both sisters received the South Moravian Region Award. In April 2019 was released a book about the famous twins Machatovy.
