= Leticia González =

Leticia González may refer to:

- Leticia González (chemist) (born 1971), Spanish theoretical chemist
- Leticia Gonzalez (politician), Argentine-born Welsh politician
