= 1965 World Rhythmic Gymnastics Championships =

- Location: Prague, Czechoslovakia
- Start date: 3 December 1965
- End date: 4 December 1965

II Rhythmic Gymnastics World Championships were held in Prague, Czechoslovakia on 3 and 4 December 1965.

Gymnasts competed four routines: a compulsory exercise without apparatus (freehand), and three optional routines, one freehand as well as one each with rope and with ball. Mila Hanzlikova, in a report on the competition, noted that in the compulsory freehand exercise, gymnasts were to "show correct walking, running in arcs and distance leaps" and that scores were lower in this exercise compared to the others.

The previous year's champion, Ludmila Savinkova, as well as Hana Mičechová, who won the competition, received the highest rope scores (9.5), while Maria Gigova received the highest with ball (9.466); Savinkova was unable to defend her title after kicking the ball into the audience.

== Participants ==
There were 35 competitors from 12 countries: Soviet Union, Czechoslovakia, Bulgaria, German Democratic Republic, Federal Republic of Germany, Hungary, Poland, Yugoslavia, Finland, Cuba, Belgium and Austria.

== Results ==
The results from both freehand routines and both apparatus routines were added together.

=== Medal table ===
Rank	Nation	Gold	Silver	Bronze	Total
1	Czechoslovakia (TCH)	2	1	2	5
2	Soviet Union (URS)	1	2	1	4
Totals (2 entries)		3	3	3	9

=== Freehand ===
Place	Name	Nation	Score
1	Tatiana Kravtchenko	(Soviet Union)	18.632
2	Hana Machatová-Bogušovská	(Czechoslovakia)	18.600
3	Hana Mičechová	(Czechoslovakia)	18.566
4	Jana Bérová	(Czechoslovakia)	18.466
=	Ludmila Savinkova	(Soviet Union)	18.466
6	Lilia Natmoutdinova	(Soviet Union)	18.366

=== Apparatus ===
Place	Name	Nation	Score
1	Hana Mičechová	(Czechoslovakia)	18.933
2	Tatiana Kravtchenko	(Soviet Union)	18.733
3	Lilia Natmoutdinova	(Soviet Union)	18.699
4	Jana Bérová	(Czechoslovakia)	18.666
5	Hana Machatová-Bogušovská	(Czechoslovakia)	18.633
6	Heide Reinsch	(East Germany)	18.632

=== All-Around ===
Place	Name	Nation	Freehand	Apparatus	Total
1	Hana Mičechová	(Czechoslovakia)	18.566	18.933	37.499
2	Tatiana Kravtchenko	(Soviet Union)	18.632	18.733	37.365
3	Hana Machatová-Bogušovská	(Czechoslovakia)	18.600	18.633	37.233
4	Jana Bérová	(Czechoslovakia)	18.466	18.666	37.132
5	Lilia Natmoutdinova	(Soviet Union)	18.366	18.699	37.065
6	Maria Gigova	(Bulgaria)	18.200	18.532	36.732
7	Heide Reinsch	(East Germany)	18.099	18.632	36.731
8	Ute Lehmann	(East Germany)	18.199	18.399	36.598
9	Rumyana Stefanova	(Bulgaria)	18.033	18.466	36.499
10	Ludmila Savinkova	(Soviet Union)	18.466	18.000	36.466
11	Maren Klüssendorf	(Germany)	17.866	18.466	36.332
12	Youlia Gantcheva	(Bulgaria)	17.832	18.266	36.098
13	Maria Patocska	(Hungary)	18.032	17.932	35.964
14	Maria Stryjecka	(Poland)	17.866	18.032	35.898
15	Wieslawa Skowronek	(Poland)	17.766	17.700	35.466
16	Ivana Obucina	(Socialist Federal Republic of Yugoslavia)	17.666	17.700	35.366
17	Ingrid Nicklas	(East Germany)	17.933	17.333	35.266
18	Ziwille Florowska	(Poland)	17.799	17.433	35.232
=	Rauni Koskinen	(Finland)	17.866	17.366	35.232
20	Elisabeth Rösel	(Germany)	17.232	17.999	35.231
21	Judit Papp	(Hungary)	17.566	17.566	35.132
22	Tatiana Radovanovic	(Socialist Federal Republic of Yugoslavia)	17.199	17.532	34.731
23	Crista Del Pino	(Cuba)	17.299	17.233	34.532
24	Zsuzsa Vasady	(Hungary)	16.899	17.399	34.298
25	Liliane Steyaert	(Belgium)	16.333	17.366	33.699
26	Thais Albertini Hernandez	(Cuba)	16.733	16.666	33.399
27	Mirjana Vutohinitch	(Socialist Federal Republic of Yugoslavia)	16.999	16.366	33.365
28	Mirta Santacana	(Cuba)	16.432	16.632	33.064
29	Hilde Krumpholz	(Austria)	16.232	16.800	33.032
30	Gerda Stacher	(Austria)	16.432	16.566	32.998
31	Luthegarde Van Nuffel	(Belgium)	16.333	32.566	
32	Helga Schüller	(Austria)	15.933	16.332	32.265
