= Ute Lehmann =

East German rhythmic gymnast (1941-1994)

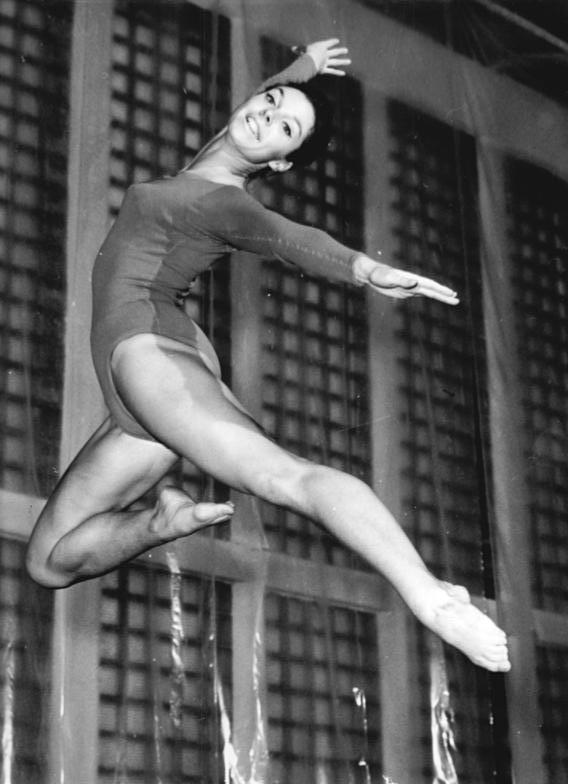

Personal information
- Full name: Ute Lehmann
- Born: 10 August 1941 Berlin-Lichterfelde, Germany
- Died: 11 March 1994 (aged 52) Leipzig

Gymnastics career
- Discipline: Rhythmic gymnastics
- Country represented: East Germany
Medal record
Representing East Germany
Rhythmic gymnastics
World Championships
Silver medal – second place	1967 Copenhagen	All-around
Bronze medal – third place	1967 Copenhagen	Rope

Ute Polster-Lehmann (10 August 1941 – 11 March 1994) was a German rhythmic gymnast who competed for East Germany. She was the 1967 world all-around silver medalist.

== Biography ==
Lehmann was born in 1941 in Berlin-Lichterfelde. She appeared in the first ever World Rhythmic Gymnastics Championships in 1963 held in Budapest, Hungary finishing 10th in the all-around. Her second appearance at the 1965 World Championships she finished 8th in the All-around. Lehmann achieved success at the 1967 World Championships in Copenhagen winning the all-around silver medal behind Soviet Elena Karpuchina, and won a bronze medal in rope.

In 1969, she married the opera singer Hermann Christian Polster. She died in 1994 in Leipzig.
