= Ludmila Savinkova =

Soviet rhythmic gymnast

- Full name: Ludmila Petrovna Savinkova
- Born: 1 January 1936 (age 90) Moscow, Russian SFSR, Soviet Union

Gymnastics career
- Discipline: Rhythmic gymnastics
- Country represented: Soviet Union
- Head coach: Maria Lisitzian
- Assistant coaches: Tamara Vartanova; Maria Lisitzian
Medal record
Representing Soviet Union
World Championships
Gold medal – first place	1963 Budapest	All-around
Gold medal – first place	1963 Budapest	Apparatus
Gold medal – first place	1963 Budapest	Freehands
Gold medal – first place	1967 Copenhagen	Group All-around

Ludmila Petrovna Savinkova (Ukrainian: Людмила Петрівна Савінкова; Russian: Людмила Петровна Савинкова; born 1 January 1936) is a retired Soviet rhythmic gymnast. She is the first World Champion in 1963 and one of the group members who won gold in the first-ever group competition held at the 1967 World Championships.

== Career ==
Savinkova was born in Moscow, Russia. In her childhood, she dreamed of becoming a ballerina and an artist. Savinkova was a typical representative of the ex Soviet RG school known for preciseness of lines and lightness of execution. Her natural elegance, style, and physical qualities were first spotted by Tamara Vartanova in the Lujniki Palace of the Pioners, Moscow. Later on, Tamara's sister, Maria Lisitzian, began to coach Savinkova and led her to the very top competitive level. In the beginning of the 1960s, Maria Lisitzian became the national Soviet RSG coach and was responsible for the team representing her country at the 1st World Championships in 1963.

28 gymnasts from 10 nations took part in a competition called the First European Cup Tournament, in the Palace of Sports, Budapest, Hungary, on Saturday 7 December 1963. They were from Belgium, Bulgaria, German Democratic Republic, Spain, Poland, USSR, Hungary, Finland and Czechoslovakia. In Rome, Italy, in 1964, FIG recognized this competition as the 1st World RSG Championships. At the event, she became the first ever to win the World All-around title. Savinkova also took part in her 2nd World Championships in 1965 in Prague but an unfortunate drop from her ball lost all her hopes of winning for the second time and kept her out of the medals.

The last World Championships she participated in was the 1967 World Championships in Copenhagen. Savinkova was one of the six gymnasts in the Soviet Union Group Exercise. This competition was the debut for the Group Exercises on the World stage. The soviets won the group gold medal. With her group gold, Savinkova retired from Rhythmic gymnastics.

During the 1970s she coached in Kiev; she worked with the group exercises in partnership with Ukrainian coach Albina Deriugina.
