= 1969 World Rhythmic Gymnastics Championships =

Sports competition

- Location: Varna, Bulgaria
- Start date: 27 September 1969
- End date: 29 September 1969

The IV World Rhythmic Gymnastics Championships were held in Varna, Bulgaria from the 27 to 29 September 1969. They were also known as the World's Gymnastique Moderne Championships.

Both the individual and group competitions were won by Bulgarians, with Maria Gigova taking the individual title above a three-way tie for second between fellow Bulgarian Neshka Robeva and Soviet gymnasts Liubov Sereda and Galima Shugurova. It was the second World Championships where groups competed, and the Bulgarian group beat the Soviet group with a higher difficulty.

== Background ==
At this point in time, the rules and interpretation of rhythmic gymnastics were still in flux; the first Code of Points would not be published until the following year. Mildred Prchal of the United States, who attended as a delegate, reported observing two distinct styles, one more rhythmic and practiced by gymnasts from countries such as Sweden, Denmark, and Switzerland, and one more balletic, seen in gymnasts from countries such as Russia, Bulgaria, and Cuba.

During a judges' session, the possibility of allowing music with more than one instrument, or alternating between, was discussed, but ultimate Berthe Villancher, the chair of rhythmic gymnastics at the International Gymnastics Federation, decided that only one instrument could be used for the entire performance. It was also stressed several times to coaches and judges that rhythmic gymnastics should not resemble ballet too closely.

18 countries sent athletes, with North Korea, France, and Holland only sending individuals and North Korea and Japan both competing at their first World Championships. In addition to the nations competing, two countries sent delegates, the United States and Israel. This experience led to the development and promotion of rhythmic gymnastics in the United States, particularly by Prchal.

== Competition overview ==
Five events were performed. Groups only performed one compulsory (fixed) exercise with balls; several groups had to change their choreography after arriving at the competition, as they had misunderstood parts of the routine. Rules were also set at the competition regarding timing of group exercises that began with a solo performance or a subset of gymnasts performing, necessitating more changes to routines. Individual performed a compulsory ball exercise as well, along with optional routines in freehand (no apparatus), hoop, and rope.

This was the last World Championships where freehand routines were performed, due to a perception that they had become too theatrical and had too much emphasis on ballet.

Prchal noted that the audience was extremely enthusiastic, repeatedly calling for gymnasts to return to the floor after they competed to curtsy and giving them flowers. After a twenty-minute delay due to cheering occurred, the mayor of Varna had to ask the crowd allow the competition to continue without further interruptions. This was noted as a problem to solve for future competitions.

A Czech report on the competition saw an improvement in technique with the legs compared to the previous World Championships, particularly with regard to leaps, as well as a great improvement in apparatus technique for the hoop, though not for the rope. The report also criticized the gymnasts as a whole for insufficient use of their trunks and for paying too little attention to the rhythm and character of the music.

== Competitors ==
There were participants from 18 countries: Bulgaria, Soviet Union, Hungary, Czechoslovakia, Romania, East Germany, West Germany, Cuba, Poland, North Korea, Yugoslavia, Sweden, Denmark, France, Belgium, the Netherlands, Italy and Japan.

== Individuals ==
=== Freehand ===
Place	Nation	Name	Score
1	(Bulgaria)	Maria Gigova	9.800
2=	(Bulgaria)	Neshka Robeva	9.700
2=	(Bulgaria)	Rumyana Stefanova	9.700
4=	(Soviet Union)	Liubov Sereda	9.600
4=	(Soviet Union)	Galina Shugurova	9.600
6	(Soviet Union)	Alla Sasouhina	9.500

=== Hoop ===
Place	Nation	Name	Score
1	(Bulgaria)	Maria Gigova	9.800
2	(Bulgaria)	Neshka Robeva	9.700
3	(Soviet Union)	Liubov Sereda	9.650
4	(Bulgaria)	Rumyana Stefanova	9.550
5	(Hungary)	Maria Patocska	9.500
6	(Soviet Union)	Galina Shugurova	9.400

=== Rope ===
Place	Nation	Name	Score
1	(Soviet Union)	Galima Shugurova	9.650
2	(Bulgaria)	Maria Gigova	9.600
3=	(Bulgaria)	Neshka Robeva	9.550
3=	(Soviet Union)	Liubov Sereda	9.550
5=	(Soviet Union)	Alla Sasouhina	9.500
5=	(Bulgaria)	Rumyana Stefanova	9.500

=== Ball ===
Place	Nation	Name	Score
1	(Soviet Union)	Galima Shugurova	9.400
2=	(Bulgaria)	Maria Gigova	9.250
2=	(Soviet Union)	Liubov Sereda	9.250
4=	(Czechoslovakia)	Hana Sitnianská	9.150
4=	(Czechoslovakia)	Jana Vonášková	9.150
6	(Bulgaria)	Neshka Robeva	9.100

=== All-Around ===
Place	Nation	Name	Freehand	Hoop	Rope	Ball	Total
1	(Bulgaria)	Maria Gigova	9.800	9.800	9.600	9.250	38.450
2=	(Bulgaria)	Neshka Robeva	9.700	9.700	9.550	9.100	38.050
2=	(Soviet Union)	Liubov Sereda	9.600	9.650	9.550	9.250	38.050
2=	(Soviet Union)	Galima Shugurova	9.600	9.400	9.650	9.400	38.050
5	(Bulgaria)	Rumyana Stefanova	9.700	9.550	9.500	9.000	37.750
6	(Soviet Union)	Alla Sasouhina	9.500	9.300	9.500	9.100	37.400
7	(Hungary)	Maria Patocska	9.450	9.500	9.350	8.700	37.000
8	(Czechoslovakia)	Hana Sitnianská	9.200	9.050	9.300	9.150	36.700
9	(Czechoslovakia)	Zdena Mlynářová	9.250	9.200	9.150	8.850	36.450
10	(Czechoslovakia)	Jana Vonášková	9.200	8.750	9.250	9.150	36.350
11	(Romania)	Victoria Vîlcu	9.400	9.050	9.100	8.750	36.300
12	(East Germany)	Elke Böttger	9.100	8.950	9.150	8.850	36.050
13=	(East Germany)	Rosemarie Halbritter	9.250	8.950	9.150	8.600	35.950
13=	(Romania)	Julia Zacharia	9.350	9.050	8.950	8.600	35.950
15=	(East Germany)	Doris Kersten	9.050	8.850	8.950	8.850	35.700
15=	(Cuba)	Sonia Pedroso	9.300	8.900	8.900	8.600	35.700
17	(Poland)	Grazina Bojanska	9.250	8.850	9.050	8.450	35.600
18	(North Korea)	Sun Duk Jo	9.500	8.850	8.700	8.450	35.500
19=	(North Korea)	Yung Hyi An	9.300	8.650	9.050	8.100	35.100
19=	(North Korea)	Myong Sim Choi	9.400	8.800	8.400	8.500	35.100
19=	(Hungary)	Agnes Varga	9.150	8.800	8.750	8.400	35.100
22	(Hungary)	Zsuzsanna Fritsch	8.950	8.950	8.900	8.250	35.050
23	(Romania)	Mihaela Nicolaescu	9.250	8.450	8.750	8.500	34.950
24	(Socialist Federal Republic of Yugoslavia)	Gordana Veberovic	8.750	8.700	8.850	8.350	34.650
25	(Socialist Federal Republic of Yugoslavia)	Ivana Obucina	9.050	8.000	8.950	8.350	34.350
26	(Cuba)	Daysi Garzon	9.300	8.700	8.350	7.950	34.300
27	(Sweden)	Eva Ericson	9.100	8.000	8.500	8.600	34.200
28	(Poland)	Dorota Trafankowska	8.900	8.600	8.100	8.200	33.800
29	(Poland)	Alina Bosko	9.050	8.700	8.550	7.450	33.750
30	(Cuba)	Ivelisse Blanco	9.000	8.000	8.900	7.800	33.700
31	(West Germany)	Maren Klüssendorf	8.500	8.250	8.450	8.450	33.650
32=	(West Germany)	Gisela Arkenberg	8.650	8.250	8.400	8.150	33.450
32=	(Denmark)	Vivian Van Deurs	8.550	8.600	8.300	8.000	33.450
34	(France)	Josette Bellanger	8.850	8.050	8.350	8.000	33.250
35=	(West Germany)	Petra Grönke	8.450	8.250	8.400	8.050	33.150
35=	(Socialist Federal Republic of Yugoslavia)	Tatiana Radovanovic	8.950	7.850	8.550	7.800	33.150
37	(Denmark)	Lone Broberg Teglers	8.850	8.500	7.900	7.750	33.000
38	(France)	Anne-Marie Estivin	8.600	8.250	7.800	7.850	32.500
39	(Denmark)	Jette Jörgensen	8.450	8.700	7.950	7.150	32.250
40	(Belgium)	Gilberte Vander Mersch	8.450	7.450	8.400	7.750	32.050
41	(France)	Marceline Mouren	8.750	7.500	8.150	7.600	32.000
42	(Netherlands)	Johanna Blevanus	8.300	7.800	8.000	7.700	31.800
43	(Netherlands)	Grietje Molenbuur	8.100	7.050	8.200	7.700	31.050
44	(Belgium)	Arlette Dekens	7.800	6.000	7.800	7.200	28.800

== Groups ==
Place	Nation	Score
1	Bulgaria	18.500
2	Soviet Union	18.300
3	Czechoslovakia	18.200
4	Hungary	18.100
5	Japan	18.050
6	Sweden	17.350
7	East Germany	17.300
8	Denmark	17.200
9	West Germany	17.100
10	Romania	16.450
11	Cuba	16.400
12	Italy	16.250
13	(Socialist Federal Republic of Yugoslavia) Yugoslavia	16.150
14	Poland	15.850
15	Belgium	13.800
