= 1967 World Rhythmic Gymnastics Championships =

- Location: Copenhagen, Denmark
- Start date: 18 December 1967
- End date: 19 December 1967

III World Rhythmic Gymnastics Championships were held on 18 and 19 December 1967 in Copenhagen, Denmark.

Fifteen countries entered the competition, with eleven sending groups; Italy only sent a group, while Brazil, France, Hungary, and Venezuela only sent individuals. Israel intended to send gymnasts, but they were unable to attend due to administrative issues. They did send observers, along with South Africa, Japan, and the United States. Each country could send a group, consisting of six gymnasts, and up to three individual competitors and an individual alternate.

Five events were contested. Groups performed a hoop routine, while individuals performed a compulsory rope routine, optional routines with the rope and hoop as well as freehand (no apparatus). The scores for the compulsory and optional rope routines were added, and all-around medals were also awarded.

The Soviet Union won the group competition, followed by Czechoslovakia and Bulgaria. The Bulgarian group received the highest scores from the judges, but they also received a penalty for using hoops that were 4 centimetres (1.6 in) too large. Unusually, the Russian group used hoops of two different sizes, which was not against the rules at the time. Barbara Sundby, an observer, from the United States, wrote that the Cuban group, which tied for fourth, was well-received by the audience, but that they focused too much on folk dance rather than gymnastic movements. She noted that there was significant discussion after the event about how to differentiate rhythmic gymnastics from ballet, acrobatics, and folk dance as well as about better standardization of the apparatuses.

Soviet gymnasts also dominated the individual competition, winning 7 of the 13 medals awarded, including two of the four golds. The vast majority of the individual gymnasts performed with a live accompanist, with only 7 using taped music.

== Participants ==
Nation	Name	Nation	Name	Nation	Name	Nation	Name
Soviet Union	Elena Karpuchina	East Germany	Ute Lehmann	Soviet Union	Liubov Sereda	Soviet Union	Natalia Ovtchinnikova
Czechoslovakia	Hana Sitnianská	Czechoslovakia	Hana Machatová-Bogušovská	Bulgaria	Krassimira Filipova	East Germany	Irene Binder
Bulgaria	Maria Gigova	East Germany	Rosemarie Halbritter	Czechoslovakia	Jiřina Machatová-Langová	Hungary	Maria Patocska
Bulgaria	Neshka Robeva	Poland	Grazina Bojanska	Cuba	Sonia Pedroso	SFR Yugoslavia	Tatiana Radovanovic
Hungary	Zsuzsanna Fritsch	Poland	Krystyna Szczepanska	Germany	Maren Klüssendorf	SFR Yugoslavia	Ivana Obucina
SFR Yugoslavia	Gordana Veberovic	Cuba	Thais Albertini Hernandez	Germany	Heide Grimminger	Denmark	Lone Broberg Teglers
France	Anne-Marie Estivin	Hungary	Judit Papp	Germany	Elisabeth Rösel	Belgium	Gilberte Vander Mersch
Cuba	Alejandra O'Farrill	Denmark	Joan Kornvig	Venezuela 1930-2006	Carmen Cabrera	France	Josette Pinon
Belgium	Annette Destercke	Belgium	Luthegarde Van Nuffel	Brazil	Daisy Pinto Barros	France	Anne-Marie Raynaud
Denmark	Birthe Vestergaard	Venezuela 1930-2006	Maria Sanchez	Poland	Ziwille Florowska		

== Medal table ==
Place	Country	Gold	Silver	Bronze	Total
1	Soviet Union	3	4	1	8
2	Czechoslovakia	1	1	0	2
3	Bulgaria	1	0	3	4
4	East Germany	0	1	1	2

== Individuals ==
=== Rope ===
Rank	Nation	Name	Score
1	Czechoslovakia	Hana Sitnianská	18.399
2	Soviet Union	Elena Karpuchina	18.366
3	East Germany	Ute Lehmann	18.333
4	Czechoslovakia	Hana Machatová-Bogušovská	18.132
5	Soviet Union	Liubov Sereda	18.100
6	Bulgaria	Neshka Robeva	17.966

=== Hoop ===
Rank	Nation	Name	Score
1	Bulgaria	Maria Gigova	9.466
=2	Soviet Union	Elena Karpuchina	9.400
=2	Soviet Union	Natalia Ovtchinnikova	9.400
4	Soviet Union	Liubov Sereda	9.300
5	East Germany	Ute Lehmann	9.266
6	Cuba	Sonia Pedroso	9.200

=== Freehand ===
Rank	Nation	Name	Score
1	Soviet Union	Liubov Sereda	9.533
2	Soviet Union	Natalia Ovtchinnikova	9.500
3=	Bulgaria	Krassimira Filipova	9.466
3=	Bulgaria	Neshka Robeva	9.466
5=	Soviet Union	Elena Karpuchina	9.433
5=	Czechoslovakia	Hana Machatová-Bogušovská	9.433

=== All-Around ===
Rank	Nation	Name	Rope	Hoop	Freehand	Total
1	Soviet Union	Elena Karpuchina	18.366	9.400	9.433	37.199
2	East Germany	Ute Lehmann	18.333	9.266	9.366	36.965
3	Soviet Union	Liubov Sereda	18.100	9.300	9.533	36.933
4	Soviet Union	Natalia Ovtchinnikova	17.933	9.400	9.500	36.833
5	Czechoslovakia	Hana Sitnianská	18.399	9.100	9.333	36.832
6	Czechoslovakia	Hana Machatová-Bogušovská	18.132	9.066	9.433	36.631
7	Bulgaria	Krassimira Filipova	17.766	9.000	9.466	36.232
8	East Germany	Irene Binder	17.766	8.933	9.233	35.932
9	Bulgaria	Maria Gigova	17.333	9.466	9.100	35.899
10 =	East Germany	Rosemarie Halbritter	17.699	8.900	9.200	35.799
10 =	Czechoslovakia	Jiřina Machatová-Langová	17.899	8.600	9.300	35.799
12	Hungary	Maria Patocska	17.733	8.833	9.200	35.766
13	Bulgaria	Neshka Robeva	17.966	8.166	9.466	35.598
14	Poland	Grazina Bojanska	17.599	8.633	9.300	35.532
15	Cuba	Sonia Pedroso	17.233	9.200	9.033	35.466
16	SFR Yugoslavia	Tatiana Radovanovic	17.399	8.933	8.966	35.298
17	Hungary	Zsuzsanna Fritsch	17.532	8.633	9.066	35.231
18	Poland	Krystyna Szczepanska	17.466	8.366	9.200	35.032
19	Germany	Maren Klüssendorf	17.666	8.266	8.600	34.532
20	SFR Yugoslavia	Ivana Obucina	16.833	8.700	8.900	34.433
21	SFR Yugoslavia	Gordana Veberovic	17.066	8.333	8.800	34.199
22	Cuba	Thais Albertini Hernandez	16.799	8.600	8.666	34.065
23	Germany	Heide Grimminger	16.933	8.500	8.400	33.833
24	Denmark	Lone Broberg Teglers	16.633	8.633	8.566	33.832
25	France	Anne-Marie Estivin	16.632	8.766	8.433	33.831
26	Hungary	Judit Papp	16.466	8.300	8.866	33.632
27	Germany	Elisabeth Rösel	16.600	8.133	8.866	33.599
28	Belgium	Gilberte Vander Mersch	16.233	8.433	8.566	33.232
29	Cuba	Alejandra O'Farrill	15.999	8.400	8.666	33.065
30	Denmark	Joan Kornvig	16.099	8.166	8.466	32.731
31 =	Venezuela 1930-2006	Carmen Cabrera	16.266	8.100	8.333	32.699
31 =	France	Josette Pinon	15.733	8.433	8.533	32.699
33	Belgium	Annette Destercke	15.666	8.200	8.433	32.299
34	Belgium	Luthegarde Van Nuffel	15.566	8.133	8.566	32.265
35	Brazil	Daisy Pinto Barros	15.366	8.466	7.566	31.398
36	France	Anne-Marie Raynaud	14.433	7.633	8.533	30.599
37	Denmark	Birthe Vestergaard	14.366	8.333	7.800	30.499
38	Venezuela 1930-2006	Maria Sanchez	14.499	7.866	7.166	29.531
39	Poland	Ziwille Florowska	8.466	8.066	9.066	25.598

== Groups ==
Rank	Nation	Score
1	Soviet Union	18.575
2	Czechoslovakia	18.375
3	Bulgaria	18.200
4=	Cuba	18.025
4=	East Germany	18.025
6	Italy	18.000
7	Yugoslavia	17.725
8	West Germany	17.650
9	Poland	17.450
10	Belgium	16.625
11	Denmark	16.400
