= List of gymnasts at the 2016 Summer Olympics =

This is a list of the gymnasts who represented their country at the 2016 Summer Olympics in Rio de Janeiro, Brazil from 5–21 August 2016. 319 gymnasts across all three disciplines (artistic gymnastics, rhythmic gymnastics and trampoline) participated in the Games.

== Female artistic gymnasts ==
	Name	Country	Date of birth (Age)
Youngest competitor	Senna Deriks	Belgium	30 December 2000 (age 15)
Oldest competitor	Oksana Chusovitina	Uzbekistan	19 June 1975 (age 41)

NOC	Name	Birth date	Hometown	Reserves
Algeria	Farah Boufadene	11 March 1999 (aged 17)	Saint-Étienne, France	
Argentina	Ailen Valente	20 March 1996 (aged 20)	Buenos Aires	
Armenia	Houry Gebeshian	27 June 1989 (aged 27)	Cleveland, U.S.	
Australia	Larrissa Miller	12 June 1992 (aged 24)	Melbourne, Victoria	Emily Little
Austria	Lisa Ecker	19 September 1992 (aged 23)	Linz	
Belarus	Kylie Dickson	12 February 1999 (aged 17)	Los Angeles, U.S.	
Belgium	Senna Deriks	30 December 2000 (aged 15)	Rotselaar	Cindy Vandenhole; Julie Meyers
Belgium	Nina Derwael	26 March 2000 (aged 16)	Sint-Truiden	Cindy Vandenhole; Julie Meyers
Belgium	Rune Hermans^{[Note 1]}	9 May 1999 (aged 17)	Haacht	Cindy Vandenhole; Julie Meyers
Belgium	Gaelle Mys	16 November 1991 (aged 24)	Ghent	Cindy Vandenhole; Julie Meyers
Belgium	Laura Waem	5 August 1997 (aged 19)	Vrasene	Cindy Vandenhole; Julie Meyers
Brazil	Rebeca Andrade	8 May 1999 (aged 17)	Guarulhos	Carolyne Pedro
Brazil	Jade Barbosa	1 July 1991 (aged 25)	Rio de Janeiro	Carolyne Pedro
Brazil	Daniele Hypólito	8 September 1984 (aged 31)	Santo André, São Paulo	Carolyne Pedro
Brazil	Lorrane Oliveira	13 April 1998 (aged 18)	Rio de Janeiro	Carolyne Pedro
Brazil	Flávia Saraiva	30 September 1999 (aged 16)	Rio de Janeiro	Carolyne Pedro
Canada	Ellie Black	8 September 1995 (aged 20)	Halifax, Nova Scotia	Madison Copiak; Megan Roberts
Canada	Shallon Olsen	10 July 2000 (aged 16)	Vancouver	Madison Copiak; Megan Roberts
Canada	Isabela Onyshko	23 June 1998 (aged 18)	Minnedosa, Manitoba	Madison Copiak; Megan Roberts
Canada	Brittany Rogers	8 June 1993 (aged 23)	Coquitlam	Madison Copiak; Megan Roberts
Canada	Rose-Kaying Woo	12 January 2000 (aged 16)	LaSalle, Quebec	Madison Copiak; Megan Roberts
Chile	Simona Castro	11 January 1989 (aged 27)	Santiago	
China	Fan Yilin	11 November 1999 (aged 16)	Taizhou	Luo Huan; Liu Jinru
China	Tan Jiaxin^{[Note 2]}	3 December 1996 (aged 19)	Changsha	Luo Huan; Liu Jinru
China	Mao Yi	16 September 1999 (aged 16)	Ruijin	Luo Huan; Liu Jinru
China	Shang Chunsong	18 March 1996 (aged 20)	Zhangjiajie	Luo Huan; Liu Jinru
China	Wang Yan	20 October 1999 (aged 16)	Beijing	Luo Huan; Liu Jinru
Colombia	Catalina Escobar	21 September 1990 (aged 25)	Spring, U.S.	
Croatia	Ana Đerek	4 September 1998 (aged 17)	Split	
Cuba	Marcia Vidiaux	21 July 1999 (aged 17)	Manzanillo	
Egypt	Sherine El-Zeiny	23 February 1991 (aged 25)	Amsterdam	
France	Marine Boyer	22 May 2000 (aged 16)	Meaux	Anne Kuhm; Juliette Bossu
France	Marine Brevet	23 November 1994 (aged 21)	Viriat	Anne Kuhm; Juliette Bossu
France	Loan His	10 April 1999 (aged 17)	Saint-Denis, Réunion	Anne Kuhm; Juliette Bossu
France	Oréane Lechenault	31 August 2000 (aged 15)	Saint-Raphaël	Anne Kuhm; Juliette Bossu
France	Louise Vanhille	6 November 1998 (aged 17)	Leffrinckoucke	Anne Kuhm; Juliette Bossu
Germany	Tabea Alt	18 March 2000 (aged 16)	Ludwigsburg	Pauline Tratz
Germany	Kim Bui	20 January 1989 (aged 27)	Tübingen	Pauline Tratz
Germany	Pauline Schäfer	4 April 1997 (aged 19)	Bierbach	Pauline Tratz
Germany	Sophie Scheder	7 January 1997 (aged 19)	Wolfsburg	Pauline Tratz
Germany	Elisabeth Seitz	4 November 1993 (aged 22)	Heidelberg	Pauline Tratz
Great Britain	Ruby Harrold	4 June 1996 (aged 20)	Bristol	Gabby Jupp; Kelly Simm; Rebecca Tunney
Great Britain	Ellie Downie	20 July 1999 (aged 17)	Nottingham	Gabby Jupp; Kelly Simm; Rebecca Tunney
Great Britain	Becky Downie	24 January 1992 (aged 24)	Nottingham	Gabby Jupp; Kelly Simm; Rebecca Tunney
Great Britain	Amy Tinkler	27 October 1999 (aged 16)	Bishop Auckland	Gabby Jupp; Kelly Simm; Rebecca Tunney
Great Britain	Claudia Fragapane	24 October 1997 (aged 18)	Bristol	Gabby Jupp; Kelly Simm; Rebecca Tunney
Greece	Vasiliki Millousi	4 May 1984 (aged 32)	Athens, Greece	
Guatemala	Ana Sofía Gómez	24 November 1995 (aged 20)	Guatemala City	
Hungary	Zsófia Kovács	6 April 2000 (aged 16)	Dunaújváros	
Iceland	Irina Sazonova	2 September 1991 (aged 24)	Reykjavík	
India	Dipa Karmakar	9 August 1993 (aged 22)	Agartala	
Ireland	Ellis O'Reilly	23 February 1998 (aged 18)	London	
Italy	Erika Fasana	17 February 1996 (aged 20)	Como	Lara Mori
Italy	Carlotta Ferlito	15 February 1995 (aged 21)	Milan	Lara Mori
Italy	Vanessa Ferrari	10 November 1990 (aged 25)	Genivolta	Lara Mori
Italy	Elisa Meneghini	24 July 1997 (aged 19)	Como	Lara Mori
Italy	Martina Rizzelli	24 March 1998 (aged 18)	Como	Lara Mori
Jamaica	Toni-Ann Williams	20 November 1995 (aged 20)	Berkeley, U.S.	
Japan	Sae Miyakawa	10 September 1999 (aged 16)	Tokyo	Natsumi Sasada; Marina Kawasaki
Japan	Mai Murakami	5 August 1996 (aged 20)	Tokyo	Natsumi Sasada; Marina Kawasaki
Japan	Aiko Sugihara	19 September 1999 (aged 16)	Higashiosaka	Natsumi Sasada; Marina Kawasaki
Japan	Asuka Teramoto	19 November 1995 (aged 20)	Komaki	Natsumi Sasada; Marina Kawasaki
Japan	Yuki Uchiyama	12 January 1998 (aged 18)	Tokyo	Natsumi Sasada; Marina Kawasaki
Mexico	Alexa Moreno	8 August 1994 (aged 21)	Mexicali	
Netherlands	Lieke Wevers	17 September 1991 (aged 24)	Leeuwarden	Tisha Volleman; Reina Beltman
Netherlands	Sanne Wevers	17 September 1991 (aged 24)	Leeuwarden	Tisha Volleman; Reina Beltman
Netherlands	Eythora Thorsdottir	10 August 1998 (aged 17)	Rotterdam	Tisha Volleman; Reina Beltman
Netherlands	Céline van Gerner	1 December 1994 (aged 21)	Zwolle	Tisha Volleman; Reina Beltman
Netherlands	Vera van Pol	17 December 1993 (aged 22)	Weert	Tisha Volleman; Reina Beltman
New Zealand	Courtney McGregor	17 November 1998 (aged 17)	Christchurch	
North Korea	Hong Un-jong	9 March 1989 (aged 27)	Hamhung	
Panama	Isabella Amado	9 August 1996 (aged 19)	Miami, U.S.	
Peru	Ariana Orrego	25 September 1998 (aged 17)	Virginia Beach, U.S.	
Poland	Katarzyna Jurkowska-Kowalska	18 February 1992 (aged 24)	Kraków	
Portugal	Ana Filipa Martins	9 January 1996 (aged 20)	Porto	
Romania	Cătălina Ponor	20 August 1987 (aged 28)	Constanța	Larisa Iordache
Russia	Angelina Melnikova	18 July 2000 (aged 16)	Voronezh	Ksenia Afanasyeva^{[Note 3]}; Lilia Akhaimova; Natalia Kapitonova
Russia	Aliya Mustafina	30 September 1994 (aged 21)	Yegoryevsk	Ksenia Afanasyeva^{[Note 3]}; Lilia Akhaimova; Natalia Kapitonova
Russia	Maria Paseka	19 July 1995 (aged 21)	Moscow	Ksenia Afanasyeva^{[Note 3]}; Lilia Akhaimova; Natalia Kapitonova
Russia	Daria Spiridonova	8 July 1998 (aged 18)	Moscow	Ksenia Afanasyeva^{[Note 3]}; Lilia Akhaimova; Natalia Kapitonova
Russia	Seda Tutkhalyan	15 July 1999 (aged 17)	Moscow	Ksenia Afanasyeva^{[Note 3]}; Lilia Akhaimova; Natalia Kapitonova
Slovakia	Barbora Mokošová	10 March 1997 (aged 19)	Bratislava	
Slovenia	Teja Belak	22 April 1994 (aged 22)	Ljubljana	
South Korea	Lee Eun-ju^{[Note 4]}	5 March 1999 (aged 17)	Shimonoseki, Japan	-
Spain	Ana Pérez	14 December 1997 (aged 18)	Sevilla	
Sweden	Emma Larsson	15 November 1998 (aged 17)	Eskilstuna	
Switzerland	Giulia Steingruber	24 March 1994 (aged 22)	Gossau	
Trinidad and Tobago	Marisa Dick	26 May 1997 (aged 19)	Edmonton	
Turkey	Tutya Yılmaz	4 June 1999 (aged 17)	Bakırköy	
Ukraine	Angelina Kysla	5 February 1991 (aged 25)	Kyiv	
United States	Simone Biles	14 March 1997 (aged 19)	Spring, Texas	Ashton Locklear; MyKayla Skinner; Ragan Smith
United States	Gabby Douglas	31 December 1995 (aged 20)	Virginia Beach, Virginia	Ashton Locklear; MyKayla Skinner; Ragan Smith
United States	Laurie Hernandez	9 June 2000 (aged 16)	Old Bridge, New Jersey	Ashton Locklear; MyKayla Skinner; Ragan Smith
United States	Madison Kocian	15 June 1997 (aged 19)	Dallas, Texas	Ashton Locklear; MyKayla Skinner; Ragan Smith
United States	Aly Raisman	25 May 1994 (aged 22)	Needham, Massachusetts	Ashton Locklear; MyKayla Skinner; Ragan Smith
Uzbekistan	Oksana Chusovitina	19 June 1975 (aged 41)	Tashkent	
Venezuela	Jessica López	22 January 1986 (aged 30)	Caracas	
Vietnam	Phan Thị Hà Thanh	16 October 1991 (aged 24)	Haiphong	

Notes

- ^{1} Rune Hermans replaced Axelle Klinckaert after an injury forced her to withdraw.
- ^{2} Tan Jiaxin replaced Liu Tingting after an injury forced her to withdraw.
- ^{3} Ksenia Afanasyeva was named as an alternate for the Russian team but announced her retirement from the sport prior to the Games.
- ^{4} Lee Eun-ju replaced Lee Go-im after an injury forced her to withdraw.

=== FIG Reserves ===
Individual Name	Team NOC
1. (Azerbaijan) Marina Nekrasova; 2. (Malaysia) Farah Ann Abdul Hadi	1. Australia; 2. Switzerland

Note: Reserve gymnasts/teams in numbered lists are ranked; reserves in unnumbered lists are unranked.

== Male artistic gymnasts ==
	Name	Country	Date of birth (Age)
Youngest competitor	Marios Georgiou	Cyprus	10 November 1997 (aged 18)
Oldest competitor	Marian Drăgulescu	Romania	18 December 1980 (aged 35)

NOC	Name	Date of birth (Age)	Hometown	Reserves
Algeria	Mohamed Abdeldjalil Bourguieg	31 August 1996 (aged 19)	Boufarik	
Argentina	Nicolás Córdoba^{[Note 1]}	20 November 1989 (aged 26)	Rosario	
Armenia	Artur Davtyan	8 August 1992 (aged 23)	Yerevan	
Armenia	Harutyun Merdinyan	16 August 1984 (aged 31)	Yerevan	
Azerbaijan	Petro Pakhnyuk	26 November 1991 (aged 24)	Baku	
Azerbaijan	Oleg Stepko	25 March 1994 (aged 22)	Baku	
Brazil	Diego Hypólito	19 June 1986 (aged 30)	Rio de Janeiro	Caio Souza; Lucas Bitencourt
Brazil	Francisco Barreto Júnior	31 October 1989 (age 26)	Ribeirão Preto	Caio Souza; Lucas Bitencourt
Brazil	Arthur Oyakawa Mariano	18 September 1993 (age 22)	Campinas	Caio Souza; Lucas Bitencourt
Brazil	Sérgio Sasaki	31 March 1992 (age 24)	São Bernardo do Campo	Caio Souza; Lucas Bitencourt
Brazil	Arthur Zanetti	16 April 1990 (age 26)	São Caetano do Sul	Caio Souza; Lucas Bitencourt
Belgium	Dennis Goossens	16 December 1993 (age 22)	Lokeren	
Belarus	Andrey Likhovitskiy	23 June 1986 (aged 30)	Minsk	
Canada	Scott Morgan	20 June 1989 (aged 27)	North Vancouver	
Chile	Tomás González	22 November 1985 (aged 30)	Santiago	
China	Deng Shudi	10 September 1991 (aged 24)	Guizhou	Liu Rongbing; Cheng Ran; Zhou Shixiong
China	Lin Chaopan	27 August 1995 (aged 20)	Fujian	Liu Rongbing; Cheng Ran; Zhou Shixiong
China	Liu Yang	10 September 1994 (aged 21)	Liaoning	Liu Rongbing; Cheng Ran; Zhou Shixiong
China	You Hao	26 April 1992 (aged 24)	Xuzhou	Liu Rongbing; Cheng Ran; Zhou Shixiong
China	Zhang Chenglong	12 May 1989 (aged 27)	Shandong	Liu Rongbing; Cheng Ran; Zhou Shixiong
Chinese Taipei	Lee Chih-kai	3 April 1996 (aged 20)	Yilan	
Colombia	Jossimar Calvo	22 July 1994 (aged 22)	Cúcuta	
Croatia	Filip Ude	3 June 1986 (aged 30)	Čakovec	
Cuba	Manrique Larduet	10 July 1996 (aged 20)	Havana	
Cuba	Randy Leru	7 November 1995 (aged 20)	Santiago de Cuba	
Cyprus	Marios Georgiou	10 November 1997 (aged 18)	Lemesos	
Czech Republic	David Jessen	5 December 1996 (aged 19)	Brno	
France	Samir Aït Saïd	1 November 1989 (aged 26)	Antibes	Zachari Hrimèche
France	Julien Gobaux	11 December 1990 (aged 25)	Monaco / Nice	Zachari Hrimèche
France	Cyril Tommasone	4 July 1987 (aged 29)	Lyon	Zachari Hrimèche
France	Danny Rodrigues	16 April 1985 (aged 31)	Rouen	Zachari Hrimèche
France	Axel Augis	6 December 1990 (aged 25)	Paris	Zachari Hrimèche
Finland	Oskar Kirmes	19 December 1995 (aged 20)	Espoo	
Germany	Andreas Bretschneider	4 August 1989 (age 26)	Chemnitz	Philipp Herder
Germany	Lukas Dauser	15 June 1993 (age 23)	Ebersberg	Philipp Herder
Germany	Fabian Hambüchen	25 October 1987 (age 28)	Wetzlar	Philipp Herder
Germany	Marcel Nguyen	8 September 1987 (age 28)	Munich	Philipp Herder
Germany	Andreas Toba	7 October 1990 (age 25)	Gehrden	Philipp Herder
Great Britain	Kristian Thomas	14 February 1989 (aged 27)	Wolverhampton	Sam Oldham; Daniel Purvis; Courtney Tulloch
Great Britain	Louis Smith	22 April 1989 (aged 27)	Peterborough	Sam Oldham; Daniel Purvis; Courtney Tulloch
Great Britain	Max Whitlock	13 January 1993 (aged 23)	Hemel Hempstead	Sam Oldham; Daniel Purvis; Courtney Tulloch
Great Britain	Nile Wilson	17 January 1996 (aged 20)	Leeds	Sam Oldham; Daniel Purvis; Courtney Tulloch
Great Britain	Brinn Bevan	16 June 1997 (aged 19)	Southend-on-Sea	Sam Oldham; Daniel Purvis; Courtney Tulloch
Greece	Vlasios Maras	31 March 1983 (aged 33)	Athens	
Greece	Eleftherios Petrounias	30 November 1990 (aged 25)	Nea Smirni	
Hungary	Vid Hidvégi	23 August 1986 (aged 29)	Budapest	
Ireland	Kieran Behan	19 April 1989 (aged 27)	Croydon	
Israel	Alexander Shatilov	22 March 1987 (aged 29)	Herzeliya	
Italy	Ludovico Edalli	18 December 1993 (aged 22)	Busto Arsizio	
Japan	Ryohei Kato	9 September 1993 (aged 22)	Tokyo	
Japan	Kenzo Shirai	24 August 1996 (aged 19)	Yokohama	
Japan	Yusuke Tanaka	29 November 1989 (aged 26)	Saitama	
Japan	Kohei Uchimura	3 January 1989 (aged 27)	Isahaya	
Japan	Koji Yamamuro	17 January 1989 (aged 27)	Koga	
Lithuania	Robert Tvorogal	5 October 1994 (aged 21)	Vilnius	
Mexico	Daniel Corral	25 January 1990 (aged 26)	Ensenada	
Monaco	Kevin Crovetto	10 June 1992 (aged 24)	Monaco	
Netherlands	Bart Deurloo	23 February 1991 (age 25)	Ridderkerk	
Netherlands	Frank Rijken	24 November 1996 (age 19)	Oostvoorne	
Netherlands	Yuri van Gelder	20 April 1983 (age 33)	Waalwijk	
Netherlands	Jeffrey Wammes	24 April 1987 (age 29)	Utrecht	
Netherlands	Epke Zonderland	16 April 1986 (age 30)	Heerenveen	
New Zealand	Mikhail Koudinov	23 June 1991 (aged 25)	Auckland	
Norway	Stian Skjerahaug	8 March 1992 (aged 24)	Stavanger	
North Korea	Ri Se-gwang	21 January 1985 (aged 31)	Pyongyang	
Romania	Marian Drăgulescu	18 December 1980 (aged 35)	Bucharest	
Romania	Andrei Vasile Muntean	30 January 1993 (age 23)	Sibiu	
Russia	Denis Ablyazin	3 August 1992 (age 24)	Penza	Nikita Ignatyev; Vladislav Polyashov
Russia	David Belyavskiy	23 February 1992 (aged 24)	Yekaterinburg	Nikita Ignatyev; Vladislav Polyashov
Russia	Nikita Nagornyy	12 February 1997 (aged 19)	Rostov-on-Don	Nikita Ignatyev; Vladislav Polyashov
Russia	Nikolai Kuksenkov	2 June 1989 (age 27)	Kyiv, Ukraine	Nikita Ignatyev; Vladislav Polyashov
Russia	Ivan Stretovich	6 October 1996 (age 29)	Novosibirsk	Nikita Ignatyev; Vladislav Polyashov
South Korea	Lee Sang-wook	14 October 1985 (age 30)	Jeonju	
South Korea	Park Min-soo	21 November 1994 (age 21)	Seoul	
South Korea	Yoo Won-chul	20 July 1984 (age 32)	Masan	
South Korea	Shin Dong-hyen	23 September 1989 (age 26)	Seoul	
South Korea	Kim Han-sol	29 December 1995 (age 20)	Seoul	
South Africa	Ryan Patterson	10 January 1994 (aged 22)	Pacifica, California	
Spain	Néstor Abad	29 March 1993 (aged 23)	Alcoy	
Spain	Rayderley Zapata	26 May 1993 (aged 23)	Madrid	
Switzerland	Christian Baumann	25 February 1995 (age 21)	Leutwil	
Switzerland	Pablo Brägger	27 November 1992 (age 23)	Oberbüren	
Switzerland	Benjamin Gischard	17 November 1995 (age 20)	Zürich	
Switzerland	Oliver Hegi	20 February 1993 (age 23)	Villmergen	
Switzerland	Eddy Yusof	2 October 1994 (age 21)	Bülach	
Turkey	Ferhat Arican	28 July 1993 (aged 23)	İzmir	
Ukraine	Vladyslav Hryko	25 January 1997 (age 19)	Kharkiv	
Ukraine	Igor Radivilov	19 October 1992 (age 23)	Kyiv	
Ukraine	Oleg Verniaiev	29 September 1993 (age 22)	Donetsk	
Ukraine	Maksym Semiankiv	20 January 1992 (age 24)	Kyiv	
Ukraine	Andrii Sienichkin	1 May 1991 (age 25)	Kyiv	
United States	Chris Brooks	19 December 1986 (aged 29)	Houston, Texas	Donnell Whittenburg; Akash Modi
United States	Jacob Dalton	19 August 1991 (aged 24)	Reno, Nevada	Donnell Whittenburg; Akash Modi
United States	Danell Leyva	30 October 1991 (aged 24)	Miami, Florida	Donnell Whittenburg; Akash Modi
United States	Sam Mikulak	13 October 1992 (aged 23)	Newport Coast, California	Donnell Whittenburg; Akash Modi
United States	Alex Naddour	4 March 1991 (aged 25)	Gilbert, Arizona	Donnell Whittenburg; Akash Modi
Uzbekistan	Anton Fokin	13 November 1982 (aged 33)	Tashkent	
Vietnam	Phạm Phước Hưng	16 June 1988 (aged 28)	Ha Noi	

Notes

- ^{1} Nicolas Cordoba replaced Gustavo Simões of Portugal, who had to withdraw after an injury.

=== FIG Reserves ===
Individual Name	Team NOC
1. (Australia) Michael Mercieca	1. Romania; 2. Spain

== Rhythmic gymnasts ==
=== Individual ===
	Name	Country	Date of birth	Age
Youngest competitor	Shang Rong	China	12 February 2000	16 years
Oldest competitor	Carolina Rodriguez	Spain	24 May 1986	30 years

NOC	Name	Birth Date
Australia	Danielle Prince	12 June 1992 (aged 24)
Austria	Nicol Ruprecht	2 October 1992 (aged 23)
Azerbaijan	Marina Durunda	12 June 1997 (aged 19)
Brazil	Natalia Gaudio	18 December 1992 (aged 23)
Belarus	Katsiaryna Halkina	25 February 1997 (aged 19)
Belarus	Melitina Staniouta	15 November 1993 (aged 22)
Bulgaria	Neviana Vladinova	23 February 1994 (aged 22)
Cape Verde	Elyane Boal	26 April 1998 (aged 18)
China	Shang Rong	12 February 2000 (aged 16)
Finland	Ekaterina Volkova	2 July 1997 (aged 19)
France	Kseniya Moustafaeva	8 June 1995 (aged 21)
Georgia	Salome Pazhava	3 September 1997 (aged 18)
Germany	Jana Berezko-Marggrander	17 October 1995 (aged 20)
Greece	Varvara Filiou	29 December 1994 (aged 21)
Israel	Neta Rivkin	19 June 1991 (aged 25)
Italy	Veronica Bertolini	19 October 1995 (aged 20)
Japan	Kaho Minagawa	20 August 1997 (aged 18)
Kazakhstan	Sabina Ashirbayeva	5 November 1998 (aged 17)
Romania	Ana Luiza Filiorianu	10 July 1999 (aged 17)
Russia	Yana Kudryavtseva	30 September 1997 (aged 18)
Russia	Margarita Mamun	1 November 1995 (aged 20)
South Korea	Son Yeon-jae	8 May 1994 (aged 22)
Spain	Carolina Rodriguez	24 May 1986 (aged 30)
Ukraine	Ganna Rizatdinova	16 July 1993 (aged 23)
United States	Laura Zeng	14 October 1999 (aged 16)
Uzbekistan	Anastasiya Serdyukova	29 May 1997 (aged 19)

=== Group ===
NOC	Name	Birthday and age	Reserves
Brazil	Morgana Gmach	17 June 1994 (aged 22)	Maiara Cândido
Brazil	Jéssica Maier	21 August 1994 (aged 21)	Maiara Cândido
Brazil	Gabrielle Moraes da Silva	4 March 1997 (aged 19)	Maiara Cândido
Brazil	Francielly Pereira	10 November 1995 (aged 20)	Maiara Cândido
Brazil	Eliane Sampaio	11 May 1992 (aged 24)	Maiara Cândido
Belarus	Ksenya Cheldishkina	23 May 1997 (aged 19)	TBD
Belarus	Hanna Dudzenkova	7 May 1994 (aged 22)	TBD
Belarus	Maria Kadobina	4 February 1997 (aged 19)	TBD
Belarus	Maryia Katsiak	2 March 1997 (aged 19)	TBD
Belarus	Valeriya Pischelina	27 February 1995 (aged 21)	TBD
Belarus	Arina Tsitsilina	9 October 1998 (aged 17)	TBD
Bulgaria	Reneta Kamberova	10 September 1990 (aged 25)	
Bulgaria	Lyubomira Kazanova		
Bulgaria	Mihaela Maevska-Velichkova	4 October 1990 (aged 25)	
Bulgaria	Tsvetelina Naydenova	28 April 1994 (aged 22)	
Bulgaria	Hristiana Todorova	28 November 1994 (aged 21)	
China	Bao Yuqing	23 September 1993 (aged 22)	
China	Shu Siyao	12 September 1992 (aged 23)	
China	Yang Ye	26 May 1994 (aged 22)	
China	Zhao Jingnan	7 March 1995 (aged 21)	
China	Zhang Ling	18 September 1992 (aged 23)	
Germany	Natalie Hermann		TBD
Germany	Anastasija Khmelnytska	31 December 1997 (aged 18)	TBD
Germany	Daniela Potapova	17 January 1996 (aged 20)	TBD
Germany	Julia Stavickaja	3 December 1997 (aged 18)	TBD
Germany	Sina Tkaltschewitsch	5 May 1999 (aged 17)	TBD
Germany	Rana Tokmak	16 July 1996 (aged 20)	TBD
Greece	Ioanna Anagnostopoulou	12 June 1997 (aged 19)	
Greece	Eleni Doika	15 November 1995 (aged 20)	
Greece	Zoi Kontogianni	19 September 1997 (aged 18)	
Greece	Michaela Metallidou	23 January 1993 (aged 23)	
Greece	Stavroula Samara	8 July 1994 (aged 22)	
Israel	Alona Koshevatskiy	8 October 1997 (aged 18)	
Israel	Ekaterina Levina	1 February 1997 (aged 19)	
Israel	Karina Lykhvar	11 December 1998 (aged 17)	
Israel	Ida Mayrin	30 October 1997 (aged 18)	
Israel	Yuval Filo	3 March 1998 (aged 18)	
Italy	Martina Centofanti	19 May 1998 (aged 18)	TBD
Italy	Sofia Lodi	29 January 1998 (aged 18)	TBD
Italy	Alessia Maurelli	22 August 1996 (aged 19)	TBD
Italy	Marta Pagnini	21 January 1991 (aged 25)	TBD
Italy	Camila Patriarca	4 November 1994 (aged 21)	TBD
Italy	Andreea Stefanusco	13 December 1993 (aged 22)	TBD
Japan	Airi Hatakeyama	16 August 1994 (aged 21)	Mao Kunii; Nanami Takenaga
Japan	Rie Matsubara	21 October 1993 (aged 22)	Mao Kunii; Nanami Takenaga
Japan	Sakura Noshitani	29 September 1997 (aged 18)	Mao Kunii; Nanami Takenaga
Japan	Sayuri Sugimoto	25 January 1996 (aged 20)	Mao Kunii; Nanami Takenaga
Japan	Kiko Yokota	11 May 1997 (aged 19)	Mao Kunii; Nanami Takenaga
Russia	Diana Borisova	21 March 1997 (aged 19)	TBD
Russia	Daria Kleshcheva	22 January 1998 (aged 18)	TBD
Russia	Anastasiia Maksimova	27 June 1991 (aged 25)	TBD
Russia	Sofya Skomorokh	18 August 1999 (aged 16)	TBD
Russia	Anastasiia Tatareva	19 July 1997 (aged 19)	TBD
Russia	Maria Tolkacheva	8 August 1997 (aged 18)	TBD
Spain	Sandra Aguilar	9 August 1992 (aged 23)	TBD
Spain	Artemi Gavezou	19 June 1994 (aged 22)	TBD
Spain	Elena Lopez	4 October 1994 (aged 21)	TBD
Spain	Lourdes Mohedano	17 June 1995 (aged 21)	TBD
Spain	Alejandra Quereda	22 July 1992 (aged 24)	TBD
Spain	Lidia Redondo	7 March 1992 (aged 24)	TBD
Ukraine	Olena Dmytrash	1 December 1991 (aged 24)	
Ukraine	Yevgeniya Gomon	25 March 1995 (aged 21)	
Ukraine	Oleksandra Gridasova	5 July 1995 (aged 21)	
Ukraine	Valeriia Gudym	1 March 1995 (aged 21)	
Ukraine	Anastasiya Voznyak	9 December 1998 (aged 17)	
United States	Kiana Eide	25 September 1998 (aged 17)	Jennifer Rokhman
United States	Alisa Kano	7 November 1994 (aged 21)	Jennifer Rokhman
United States	Natalie McGiffert	14 March 1997 (aged 19)	Jennifer Rokhman
United States	Monica Rokhman	27 May 1997 (aged 19)	Jennifer Rokhman
United States	Kristen Shaldybin	8 August 1997 (aged 18)	Jennifer Rokhman
Uzbekistan	Samira Amirova	2 April 1998 (aged 18)	
Uzbekistan	Valeriya Davidova	15 December 1997 (aged 18)	
Uzbekistan	Luiza Ganieva	11 November 1995 (aged 20)	
Uzbekistan	Zarina Kurbonova	6 May 1995 (aged 21)	
Uzbekistan	Marta Rostoburova	29 March 1996 (aged 20)	

Note: Each NOC may only name 5 gymnasts to the group competition.

=== FIG Reserves ===
Individual Name	Group NOC
1. (Mexico) Karla Diaz; 2. (Canada) Patricia Bezzoubenko	1. Finland; 2. Azerbaijan

== Male Trampoline gymnasts ==
	Name	Country	Date of birth	Age
Youngest competitor	Pirmammad Aliyev	Kazakhstan	2 November 1997	18 years
Oldest competitor	Sébastien Martiny	France	27 February 1985	31 years

NOC	Name	Birth Date and Age
Australia	Blake Gaudry	29 November 1991 (aged 24)
Belarus	Uladzislau Hancharou	2 December 1995 (aged 20)
Brazil	Rafael Andrade	7 May 1986 (aged 30)
Canada	Jason Burnett	12 June 1992 (aged 24)
China	Dong Dong	13 April 1989 (aged 27)
China	Gao Lei	3 January 1992 (aged 24)
France	Sébastien Martiny	27 February 1985 (aged 31)
Great Britain	Nathan Bailey	24 July 1993 (aged 23)
Japan	Masaki Ito	2 November 1988 (aged 27)
Japan	Ginga Munetomo	7 April 1994 (aged 22)
Kazakhstan	Pirmammad Aliyev	2 November 1997 (age 18)
New Zealand	Dylan Schmidt	7 January 1997 (aged 19)
Portugal	Diogo Abreu	5 September 1993 (aged 22)
Russia	Dmitry Ushakov	15 August 1988 (aged 27)
Russia	Andrey Yudin	6 June 1996 (aged 20)
United States	Logan Dooley	26 September 1987 (aged 28)

=== FIG Reserve ===
#	NOC
1	Colombia

== Female Trampoline gymnasts ==
	Name	Country	Date of birth	Age
Youngest competitor	Nicole Ahsinger	United States	12 May 1998	18 years
Oldest competitor	Tatsiana Piatrenia	Belarus	18 October 1981	34 years

NOC	Name	Birth Date and Age
Belarus	Hanna Harchonak	11 February 1992 (aged 24)
Belarus	Tatsiana Piatrenia	18 October 1981 (aged 34)
Canada	Rosannagh MacLennan	28 August 1988 (aged 27)
China	He Wenna	19 January 1989 (aged 27)
China	Li Dan	19 September 1988 (aged 27)
France	Marine Jurbert	11 December 1992 (aged 23)
Georgia	Luba Golovina	20 April 1990 (aged 26)
Germany	Leonie Adam	2 January 1993 (aged 23)
Great Britain	Katherine Driscoll	13 March 1986 (aged 30)
Great Britain	Bryony Page	10 December 1990 (aged 25)
Japan	Rana Nakano	10 September 1997 (aged 18)
Portugal	Ana Rente	27 April 1988 (aged 28)
Russia	Yana Pavlova	6 January 1996 (aged 20)
Ukraine	Nataliia Moskvina	9 June 1988 (aged 28)
United States	Nicole Ahsinger	12 May 1998 (aged 18)
Uzbekistan	Ekaterina Khilko	25 March 1982 (aged 34)

=== FIG Reserve ===
#	NOC
1	Greece
