= 2014 Rhythmic Gymnastics World Championships =

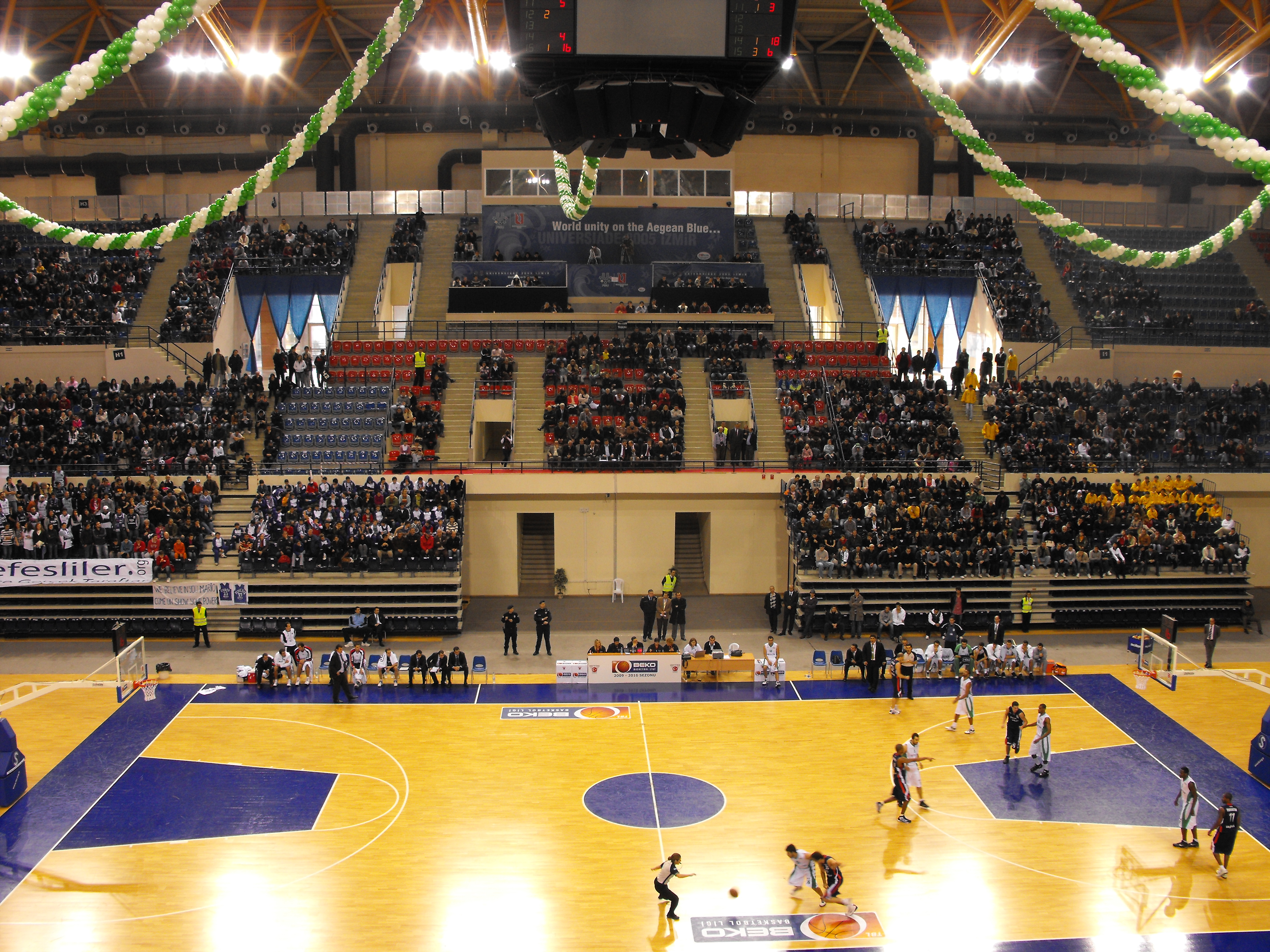
- Halkapınar Sport Hall, where the competition took place
- Venue: Halkapınar Sport Hall
- Location: İzmir, Turkey
- Start date: 21 September 2014
- End date: 28 September 2014

The 2014 Rhythmic Gymnastics World Championships, the 33rd edition, was held in İzmir, Turkey, from 21 to 28 September, 2014 at the Halkapınar Sport Hall.

Apparatus finals were held concurrently with the all-around qualifications, with the top gymnasts on each apparatus competing in the final after the apparatus qualifications were finished. 58 federations sent a total of 312 gymnasts: 133 individuals and 179 members of 31 groups.

Yana Kudryavtseva of the Russian Federation lead the all-around qualifications ahead of fellow Russian Margarita Mamun and Ukrainian Hanna Rizatdinova, and the medal placements were repeated in the final. Kudryavtseva became the youngest rhythmic gymnast to win back-to-back individual all-around titles in the World Championships at 16 years old.

Kudryavtseva also won the apparatus titles in hoop, ball (shared with Mamun), and clubs, while Mamun won the gold with ribbon. Son Yeon-jae from South Korea won her country's first medal at the World Championships, a bronze with hoop. Melitina Staniouta of Belarus won the ball bronze. Rizatdinova won the other two apparatus bronze medals with clubs and ribbon.

In the group competition, the host country of Turkey entered a group for the first time, as did Egypt and Thailand. The Russian group was favored to win, but they had serious mistakes in both routines: one gymnast had to run off the floor after a club in the 10 clubs routine, and they had a knotted ribbon in their 3 balls + 2 ribbons routine. They finished off the podium in fourth place, while the Bulgarian group won the group all-around 18 years after they last did so at the 1996 World Championships held in Budapest, Hungary. The Italian group won silver and the Belarusian group bronze.

In the group apparatus finals, the Spanish group, which had placed 11th in the all-around, rebounded to win the 10 clubs final, as they had done at the 2013 World Championships, and the Russian group also defended their title in the 3 balls + 2 ribbons final.

The Longines Prize for Elegance was awarded to Kudryavtseva.

== Participating countries ==
The following federations sent gymnasts to the Championships:

- Angola
- Argentina
- Armenia
- Australia
- Austria
- Azerbaijan
- Belgium
- Belarus
- Brazil
- Bulgaria
- Canada
- Chile
- China
- Cape Verde
- Croatia
- Cuba
- Cyprus
- Czech Republic
- Egypt
- Spain
- Estonia
- Finland
- France
- Great Britain
- Georgia
- Germany
- Greece
- Hungary
- Israel
- Italy
- Japan
- Kazakhstan
- Kyrgyzstan
- South Korea
- Latvia
- Lithuania
- Mexico
- Namibia
- Norway
- Poland
- Portugal
- Romania
- Russia
- Singapore
- Slovenia
- South Africa
- San Marino
- Serbia
- Sweden
- Turkey
- Ukraine
- United States
- Uzbekistan
- Venezuela

== Schedule ==
Sat Sep 20 Saturday

- 09:00-19:00 Training and Podium training for Individuals as per schedule

Sun Sep 21 Sunday

- 09:00-19:00 Training and Podium training for Individuals
- 19:00-21:00 Opening Ceremony

Sep 22 Monday

- 10:00-11:30 CI Individual group A - Hoop and Ball alternatively
- 12:00-13:35 CI Individual group B - Hoop and Ball alternatively
- 15:00-16:40 CI Individual group C - Hoop and Ball alternatively
- 17:10-18:45 CI Individual group D - Hoop and Ball alternatively

Sep 23 Tuesday

- 10:00-11:40 CI Individual group C - Hoop and Ball alternatively
- 12:10-13:45 CI Individual group D - Hoop and Ball alternatively
- 15:15-16:45 CI Individual, group A - Hoop and Ball alternatively
- 17:15-18:55 CI Individual, group B - Hoop and Ball alternatively
- 20:00-20:30 CIII Individual Hoop
- 20:30-21:00 CIII Individual Ball

Award Ceremony Individual Final Hoop
Award Ceremony Individual Final Ball

Sep 24 Wednesday

- 10:00-11:10 CI Individual group D - Clubs and Ribbon alternatively
- 11:10-12:20 CI Individual group C - Clubs and Ribbon alternatively
- 14:00-15:10 CI Individual group B - Clubs and Ribbon alternatively
- 15:10-16:15 CI Individual group A - Clubs and Ribbon alternatively

Sep 25 Thursday

- 10:00-11:10 CI Individual group B - Clubs and Ribbon alternatively
- 11:10-12:15 CI Individual group A - Clubs and Ribbon alternatively
- 14:00-15:10 CI Individual group D - Clubs and Ribbon alternatively
- 15:10-16:20 CI Individual group C - Clubs and Ribbon alternatively
- 20:00-20:30 CIII Individual Clubs
- 20:30-21:00 CIII Individual Ribbon

Award Ceremony Individual Final Clubs
Award Ceremony Individual Final Ribbon
Award Ceremony Teams

Sep 26 Friday

- 16:30-19:00 CII Individuals (gymnasts ranked 13-24)
- 20:00-22:30 CII Individuals (gymnasts ranked 1-12)

Longines Prize of Elegance
Award ceremony Individual All-Around Final

Sep 27 Saturday

- 15:00-17:15 CI Groups - 10 Clubs and 3 Balls + 2 Ribbons alternatively
- 17:45-20:00 CI Groups - 10 Clubs and 3 Balls + 2 Ribbons alternatively

Award Ceremony General Competition Groups

Sep 28 Sunday

- 15:00-15:40 CIII Groups - 10 Clubs
- 15:40-16:20 CIII Groups - 3 Balls + 2 Ribbons

Award Ceremony Group Final 10 Clubs
Award Ceremony Group Final 3 Balls + 2 Ribbons

== Medal winners ==
Event	Gold	Silver	Bronze
Team Competition
All-Around	Russia; Yana Kudryavtseva; Margarita Mamun; Aleksandra Soldatova	Belarus; Arina Charopa; Katsiaryna Halkina; Melitina Staniouta	Ukraine; Viktoria Mazur; Ganna Rizatdinova; Eleonora Romanova
Individual Finals
Hoop	Yana Kudryavtseva (RUS)	Margarita Mamun (RUS)	Son Yeon-jae (KOR)
Ball	Yana Kudryavtseva (RUS)	None awarded	Melitina Staniouta (BLR)
Ball	Margarita Mamun (RUS)	None awarded	Melitina Staniouta (BLR)
Clubs	Yana Kudryavtseva (RUS)	Margarita Mamun (RUS)	Ganna Rizatdinova (UKR)
Ribbon	Margarita Mamun (RUS)	Yana Kudryavtseva (RUS)	Ganna Rizatdinova (UKR)
All-Around	Yana Kudryavtseva (RUS)	Margarita Mamun (RUS)	Ganna Rizatdinova (UKR)
Groups Finals
All-Around	Bulgaria; Reneta Kamberova; Mihaela Maevska-Velichkova; Tsvetelina Naydenova; Tsvetelina Stoyanova; Hristiana Todorova	Italy; Arianna Facchinetti; Alessia Maurelli; Marta Pagnini; Camilla Patriarca; Lodi Sofia; Andreea Stefanescu	Belarus; Ksenya Cheldishkina; Hanna Dudzenkova; Maria Kadobina; Maryia Katsiak; Valeriya Pischelina; Arina Tsitsilina
10 Clubs	Spain; Sandra Aguilar; Artemi Gavezou; Elena López; Lourdes Mohedano; Alejandra Quereda	Israel; Yuval Filo; Alona Koshevatskiy; Ekaterina Levina; Karina Lykhvar; Ida Mayrin	Belarus; Ksenya Cheldishkina; Hanna Dudzenkova; Maria Kadobina; Maryia Katsiak; Valeriya Pischelina*; Arina Tsitsilina
3 Balls + 2 Ribbons	Russia; Daria Avtonomova; Diana Borisova; Anastasia Maksimova; Aleksandra Semenova; Anastasia Tatareva*; Maria Tolkacheva	Bulgaria; Reneta Kamberova; Mihaela Maevska-Velichkova; Tsvetelina Naydenova; Tsvetelina Stoyanova; Hristiana Todorova	Belarus; Ksenya Cheldishkina; Hanna Dudzenkova; Maria Kadobina; Maryia Katsiak*; Valeriya Pischelina; Arina Tsitsilina

* reserve gymnast

== Individual ==
=== Teams Competition and Individual Qualification ===
The team competition was held concurrently with all-around qualifications and was only for countries with at least three participating gymnasts. Only gymnasts competing with at least three apparatuses can compete for the all-around qualifications, with the top three highest scores counted. The top 24 in qualifications advance to the all-around finals.

Nation/Gymnasts	Hoop (rhythmic gymnastics)	Ball (rhythmic gymnastics)	Clubs (rhythmic gymnastics)	Ribbon (rhythmic gymnastics)	Total
Russia (1)	54.933	54.691	36.766	37.249	147.914
Yana Kudryavtseva	18.533	18.650	18.133	18.616	55.799 (1)
Margarita Mamun	18.350	18.366	18.633	18.633	55.632 (2)
Aleksandra Soldatova	18.050	17.675			35.725
Belarus (2)	50.233	51.799	33.408	33.099	136.073
Melitina Staniouta	16.900	17.966	17.175	16.866	52.041 (5)
Katsiaryna Halkina	17.000	17.300	16.233	16.233	50.533 (11)
Arina Charopa	16.333	16.533			32.866
Ukraine (3)	51.066	49.032	33.283	33.533	135.515
Ganna Rizatdinova	18.033	17.583	17.600	17.600	53.233 (3)
Viktoria Mazur	16.650	15.733	15.683	15.933	48.316 (21)
Eleonora Romanova	16.383	15.716			32.099
Israel (4)	47.974	48.757	32.141	33.308	133.939
Neta Rivkin	17.325	17.333	16.166	17.000	51.658 (6)
Victoria Veinberg Filanovsky	16.916	16.916	15.975	16.308	50.140 (12)
Martina Poplinsky	13.733	14.508			28.241
Azerbaijan (5)	49.466	49.157	32.791	32.283	132.648
Marina Durunda	17.150	17.491	16.850	16.800	51.491 (8)
Nilufar Niftaliyeva	16.366	15.566			
Gulsum Shafizada	15.950	16.100	15.941	15.483	47.991
Spain (6)	47.624	46.816	31.582	33.200	130.697
Carolina Rodriguez	16.866	17.183	16.116	17.300	51.349 (9)
Natalia García	16.133	15.733	15.466	15.900	47.766
Sara Llana	14.625	13.900			28.525
Bulgaria (7)	47.732	47.965	33.075	32.224	129.930
Mariya Mateva	16.666	15.741	16.500	16.441	49.607 (16)
Neviana Vladinova	15.350	16.108	16.575		48.033
Radina Flipova	15.716	16.166		15.783	47.615
Uzbekistan (8)	48.549	47.640	32.216	31.574	129.480
Elizaveta Nazarenkova	16.616	15.516	16.750	16.516	49.882 (14)
Djamila Rakhmatova	15.900	16.683	15.466	15.058	48.049 (24)
Anastasiya Serdyukova	16.033	15.441			31.474
Italy (9)	48.158	48.257	31.858	31.899	129.256
Veronica Bertolini	16.483	16.833	16.200	16.283	49.599 (17)
Giulia di Luca	15.375	15.541			30.916
Alessia Russo	16.300	15.883	15.658	15.616	47.841
South Korea (10)	44.007	46.316	32.383	31.824	127.981
Son Yeon-jae	17.350	17.483	17.433	17.733	52.649 (4)
Gim Yun-hee	13.591	15.350	14.950	14.091	44.391
Lee Da-ae	13.066	13.483			26.549
Japan (11)	46.324	47.783	30.949	31.866	127.864
Kaho Minagawa	14.708	16.700	16.066	15.366	48.132 (23)
Sakura Hayakawa	16.200	16.733	14.883	16.500	49.433 (18)
Maho Mikami	15.416	14.350			29.766
United States (12)	46.216	46.765	32.407	31.066	126.954
Jasmine Kerber	16.716	15.641	16.441	15.550	48.798 (19)
Rebecca Sereda	14.550	15.291	15.966	15.516	46.773
Serena Lu	14.950	15.833			30.783
China (13)	45.982	42.465	31.474	32.100	126.189
Deng Senyue	17.383	15.366	17.341	16.875	51.599 (7)
Wang Yili	14.066	11.766	14.133		39.965
Liu Jiahu	14.533	15.333		15.225	45.091
Finland (14)	45.774	46.741	31.050	31.299	125.290
Jouki Tikkanen	15.900	16.300	15.850	15.966	48.166 (22)
Kati Rantsi	14.883	14.691			29.574
Ekaterina Volkova	14.991	15.750	15.200	15.333	46.283
Georgia (15)	45.032	45.741	30.816	30.458	124.014
Gabriela Khvedelidze	14.633	14.541		14.450	43.624
Salome Phajava	16.566	17.000	16.383	16.008	49.949 (13)
Liana Tsetsadze	13.833	14.200	14.433		42.466
Estonia (16)	45.649	44.266	29.716	30.199	121.547
Olga Bogdanova	15.850	13.900	15.333	15.083	46.266
Viktoria Bogdanova	14.866	15.116		15.116	45.098
Carmel Kallemaa	14.933	15.250	14.383		44.566
Mexico (17)	42.557	44.999	28.149	30.649	119.513
Cynthia Valdez	15.716	15.433	14.033	15.366	46.515
Karla Diaz	13.391	14.383	14.116		41.890
Rut Castillo Galindo	13.450	15.183		15.283	43.916
Austria (18)	42.241	43.266	30.616	28.683	119.307
Nicol Ruprecht	15.875	15.850	16.300	14.150	48.025
Natascha Wegscheider	13.800	14.483	14.316	14.533	43.332
Sophia Lindtner	12.566	12.933			25.499
Kazakhstan (19)	42.283	43.366	30.450	30.083	119.082
Aliya Assymova	15.183	15.200	15.750	15.500	46.450
Aidana Sarybay	13.425	13.841		14.583	41.849
Selina Zhumatayeva	13.675	14.325	14.700		42.700
Brazil (20)	44.249	44.049	29.449	27.183	117.474
Angelica Kvieczynski	15.725	15.541			31.266
Natalia Gaudio	14.258	14.258	14.566	13.500	43.082
Andressa Jardim	14.266	14.250	14.883	13.683	43.399
Canada (21)	41.882	44.307	28.791	27.883	117.647
Patricia Bezzoubenko	16.033	16.633	15.783	15.350	48.449 (20)
Maria Kitkarska	12.683	13.866	13.008		39.557
Annabelle Kovacs	13.166	13.808		12.533	39.507
United Kingdom (22)	44.258	41.949	29.182	28.400	116.673
Laura Halford	15.558	14.433	14.416	14.225	44.407
Mimi-Isabella Cesar	13.400	13.716			27.116
Stephani Sherlock	15.300	13.800	14.766	14.175	44.241
Slovenia (23)	43.199	41.933	28.041	28.416	114.823
Monija Cebasek	13.916	13.350	13.416		40.682
Sara Kragulj	14.333	14.533		13.916	42.782
Spela Kratochwill	14.950	14.050	14.625	14.500	44.075
Czech Republic (24)	42.432	41.665	27.816	28.032	113.613
Monika Mickova	14.700	14.466	14.350	14.516	43.682
Anna Sebkova	12.866	13.483	13.466	13.516	40.465
Nataly Hamrikova	14.866	13.716			28.582
Portugal (25)	40.299	39.649	28.033	27.200	109.856
Carolina Coelho	13.791	13.858	13.650	14.050	41.699
Rafaela Coimbra	13.558	13.416	14.383		41.357
Tania Domingues	12.950	12.375		13.150	38.475
Armenia (26)	41.025	37.682	27.032	26.133	108.956
Lilit Harutyunan	14.575	14.166	15.216		43.957
Luiza Sadyan	12.900			12.833	25.733
Klara Simonyan		11.100	11.816		22.916
Anna Svirina	13.550	12.416		13.300	39.266
Egypt (27)	38.891	40.707	26.625	25.574	107.373
Sara Rostom	13.608	14.283	13.450	11.941	41.341
Nourhal Kattab	12.800	13.666		13.633	40.099
Fatma Salman	12.483	12.758	13.175		38.416
Lithuania (28)	38.291	38.382	23.849	24.407	102.363
Anastasija Grisanina	11.400	13.541	12.683	12.366	38.590
Karolina Sklenyte	14.375	12.700	11.166	12.041	39.116
Olga Stork	12.516	12.141			24.657
Norway (29)	37.182	36.541	23.516	21.899	98.272
Emilie Holte	12.850	12.950	11.566	12.133	37.933
Fanny Cecilie Hozman Lunde	11.666	11.100			22.766
Marie Therese Ruud	12.666	12.491	11.950	9.766	37.107
Kyrgyzstan (30)	33.357	36.182	23.625	22.024	94.539
Saltanat Kiiazova	12.166	11.991	12.175		36.332
Regina Miaksheva	11.275	12.550	11.450	10.733	35.275
Aiturgan Myrzakhmatova	9.916	11.641		11.291	32.848
Serbia (31)	35.341	31.491	21.049	22.275	90.140
Anja Jovanovic	11.258	10.266	10.533		32.057
Lana Radovic	11.625	11.475		11.300	34.400
Sofija Vukicevic	12.458	9.750	10.516	10.975	33.949
Angola (32)	20.532	18.399	14.449	14.600	56.414
Sofia Higino	6.260	5.433			11.699
Anna Mpanzu	7.416	6.833	7.816	7.800	23.032
Alice Tomas	6.850	6.133	6.633	6.800	20.283
Other non-Team	---	---	---	---	---
Kseniya Moustafaeva (FRA)	16.933	17.016	16.966	16.333	50.915 (10)
Varvara Filiou (GRE)	16.350	17.085	16.266	15.975	49.699 (15)
Jana Berezko-Marggrander (GER)	15.600	16.058	16.208	15.400	47.866
Alexandra Piscupescu (ROU)	15.900	15.916	15.783	15.433	47.599
Anna Czarniecka (POL)	15.700	15.133	15.491	15.316	46.507
Kyriaki Alevrogianni (GRE)	15.350	15.600	13.383	15.233	46.183
Iuliana Liubomeiscaia (MDA)	14.600	14.383	13.983	13.833	42.966
Elif Zeynep Celep (TUR)	13.266	14.533	14.816	12.816	42.615
Themida Christodoulidou (CYP)	13.816	14.433	14.333	12.466	42.582
Grace Legote (RSA)	13.741	13.150	14.283	13.933	41.957
Danielle Prince (AUS)	13.250	13.500	14.275	13.633	41.408
Xenia Kilianova (SVK)	13.800	13.900	13.116	13.700	41.400
Mirjana Sekovanic (CRO)	13.833	13.933	13.466	12.666	41.232
Amy Quinn (AUS)	13.500	13.650	12.666	13.183	40.333
Daniella Zita Kecza (HUN)	13.208	13.325	12.241	13.500	40.033
Michelle Steffanie Salazar (VEN)	12.991	11.825	12.933	13.600	39.524
Elena Milenkovic (CRO)	12.950	13.733	12.441	11.316	39.124
Ana Carrasco Pini (ARG)	12.541	12.383	11.516	13.400	38.324
Tong Kah Mun (SIN)	13.050	11.250	12.333	12.825	38.208
Najlae Ou-Ghanem (BEL)	12.925	12.266	11.225	12.816	38.007
Yansy De la Cartaya (CUB)	12.658	12.075	12.983	10.916	37.716
Joke Verpoest (BEL)	11.566	13.025	12.150	11.708	36.883
Lucia Castiglioni (SMR)	11.666	11.733	12.966	11.400	36.365
Camila Giorgi (ARG)	11.866	11.766	12.291	8.616	35.923
Ignacia Icaza (CHI)	10.766	11.550	12.083	12.275	35.908
Nicole Monique Bierbach (NAM)	12.216	11.425	10.216	10.233	33.874
Jennifer Pettersson (SWE)	10.466	11.808	10.941	11.033	33.782
Viktoria Soos (HUN)	10.383	11.033	9.966	10.083	31.499

=== Hoop ===
Rank	Gymnast	Nation	D Score	E Score	Pen.	Total
1st place, gold medalist(s)	Yana Kudryavtseva	Russia	9.450	9.366		18.816
2nd place, silver medalist(s)	Margarita Mamun	Russia	9.250	9.200		18.450
3rd place, bronze medalist(s)	Son Yeon-jae	South Korea	9.000	8.966		17.966
4	Ganna Rizatdinova	Ukraine	9.000	8.933		17.933
5	Deng Senyue	China	8.850	8.733		17.583
6	Marina Durunda	Azerbaijan	8.700	8.800		17.500
6	Neta Rivkin	Israel	8.500	9.000		17.500
8	Katsiaryna Halkina	Belarus	7.975	8.700		16.675

=== Ball ===
Rank	Gymnast	Nation	D Score	E Score	Pen.	Total
1st place, gold medalist(s)	Yana Kudryavtseva	Russia	9.200	9.233		18.433
1st place, gold medalist(s)	Margarita Mamun	Russia	9.200	9.233		18.433
3rd place, bronze medalist(s)	Melitina Staniouta	Belarus	8.900	9.100		18.000
4	Ganna Rizatdinova	Ukraine	9.000	8.900		17.900
5	Son Yeon-jae	South Korea	8.800	8.933		17.733
6	Katsiaryna Halkina	Belarus	8.650	8.800		17.450
7	Marina Durunda	Azerbaijan	8.500	8.766		17.266
8	Neta Rivkin	Israel	8.200	8.933		17.133

=== Clubs ===
Rank	Gymnast	Nation	D Score	E Score	Pen.	Total
1st place, gold medalist(s)	Yana Kudryavtseva	Russia	9.350	9.400		18.750
2nd place, silver medalist(s)	Margarita Mamun	Russia	9.350	9.300		18.650
3rd place, bronze medalist(s)	Ganna Rizatdinova	Ukraine	8.900	9.100		18.000
4	Son Yeon-jae	South Korea	8.800	9.033		17.833
5	Deng Senyue	China	8.700	9.000		17.700
5	Marina Durunda	Azerbaijan	8.500	8.966		17.466
7	Melitina Staniouta	Belarus	8.325	8.900		17.225
8	Kseniya Moustafaeva	France	8.450	8.766		17.216

=== Ribbon ===
Rank	Gymnast	Nation	D Score	E Score	Pen.	Total
1st place, gold medalist(s)	Margarita Mamun	Russia	9.200	9.366		18.566
2nd place, silver medalist(s)	Yana Kudryavtseva	Russia	8.950	9.233		18.183
3rd place, bronze medalist(s)	Ganna Rizatdinova	Ukraine	8.700	9.066		17.766
4	Melitina Staniouta	Belarus	8.400	8.800		17.200
5	Son Yeon-jae	South Korea	8.150	8.900		17.050
6	Deng Senyue	China	8.050	8.900		16.950
7	Carolina Rodriguez	Spain	7.800	8.533		16.333
7	Neta Rivkin	Israel	7.600	8.733		16.333

=== All-Around ===
Rank	Gymnast	Nation	Hoop (rhythmic gymnastics)	Ball (rhythmic gymnastics)	Clubs (rhythmic gymnastics)	Ribbon (rhythmic gymnastics)	Total
1st place, gold medalist(s)	Yana Kudryavtseva	Russia	19.000	18.800	18.916	18.550	75.266
2nd place, silver medalist(s)	Margarita Mamun	Russia	18.316	18.600	18.450	18.783	74.149
3rd place, bronze medalist(s)	Ganna Rizatdinova	Ukraine	18.166	17.983	18.200	18.100	72.449
4	Son Yeon-jae	South Korea	17.950	17.350	17.800	17.833	70.933
5	Deng Senyue	China	17.800	17.200	17.450	17.316	69.766
6	Marina Durunda	Azerbaijan	17.500	17.566	17.666	16.833	69.565
7	Melitina Staniouta	Belarus	18.000	17.266	16.650	17.566	69.482
8	Katsiaryna Halkina	Belarus	17.166	17.383	17.300	16.850	68.699
9	Neta Rivkin	Israel	17.250	17.200	17.450	16.783	68.683
10	Carolina Rodriguez	Spain	17.183	17.066	17.316	16.883	68.448
11	Kseniya Moustafaeva	France	17.283	16.408	17.266	16.933	67.890
12	Victoria Veinberg Filanovsky	Israel	17.150	16.666	17.116	16.491	67.423
13	Salome Phajava	Georgia	16.933	16.966	17.133	16.150	67.182
14	Mariya Mateva	Bulgaria	16.316	16.783	16.583	16.266	65.948
15	Elizaveta Nazarenkova	Uzbekistan	15.766	16.200	16.575	16.983	65.524
16	Sakura Hayakawa	Japan	15.933	16.683	16.466	16.175	65.257
17	Jouki Tikkanen	Finland	16.400	16.416	16.133	16.300	65.249
18	Viktoria Mazur	Ukraine	15.991	15.983	16.400	16.725	65.099
19	Jasmine Kerber	United States	16.733	15.933	15.850	16.066	64.582
20	Varvara Filiou	Greece	16.133	15.733	15.700	16.850	64.416
21	Djamila Rakhmatova	Uzbekistan	15.983	16.233	16.250	15.816	64.282
22	Veronica Bertolini	Italy	16.250	16.691	15.966	15.183	64.090
23	Kaho Minagawa	Japan	15.133	16.566	15.633	15.966	63.298
24	Patricia Bezzoubenko	Canada	15.658	16.466	16.066	14.150	62.340

== Groups ==
=== Group compositions ===
- (Angola) Margarida Cabral
- (Angola) Nkumba Francisco
- (Angola) Yolanda Gaspar
- (Angola) Jandira Henriques
- (Angola) Beniude Panguleipo
- (Austria) Anastasiya Detkova
- (Austria) Vanessa Nachbaur
- (Austria) Anna Ruprecht
- (Austria) Anna Sprinzl
- (Austria) Lena Vertacnik
- (Azerbaijan) Sabina Abbasova
- (Azerbaijan) Diana Doman
- (Azerbaijan) Aynur Mustafayeva
- (Azerbaijan) Aliya Pashayeva
- (Azerbaijan) Aliaksandra Platonova
- (Azerbaijan) Siyana Vasileva
- (Belarus) Ksenya Cheldishkina
- (Belarus) Hanna Dudzenkova
- (Belarus) Maria Kadobina
- (Belarus) Maryia Katsiak
- (Belarus) Valeriya Pischelina
- (Belarus) Arina Tsitsilina
- (Brazil) Beatriz Francisco
- (Brazil) Mayra de Fatima Gmach
- (Brazil) Francielly Machado Pereira
- (Brazil) Isadora Magalhaes Silva
- (Brazil) Gabrielle Moraes da Silva
- (Brazil) Eliane Rosa Sampaio
- (Bulgaria) Reneta Kamberova
- (Bulgaria) Mihaela Maevska-Velichkova
- (Bulgaria) Tsvetelina Naydenova
- (Bulgaria) Tsvetelina Stoyanova
- (Bulgaria) Hristiana Todorova
- (Canada) Katrina Cameron
- (Canada) Maya Kojevnikov
- (Canada) Teija Korjus
- (Canada) Lucinda Nowell
- (Canada) Anjelika Reznik
- (Canada) Victoria Reznik
- (China) Bao Yuqing
- (China) Ding Ziyi
- (China) Shu Siyao
- (China) Yang Ye
- (China) Zhang Ling
- (China) Zhao Jingnan
- (Czech Republic) Katerina Gerychova
- (Czech Republic) Veronika Hegrova
- (Czech Republic) Alice Hejcova
- (Czech Republic) Tereza Lohynska
- (Czech Republic) Lenka Siroka
- (Czech Republic) Katerina Vernerova
- (Egypt) Yara Ahmed Baraka
- (Egypt) Jacinthe Tarek Eldeeb
- (Egypt) Alia Yassin Elkatib
- (Egypt) Sarah Elkattan
- (Egypt) Aisha Elkolali
- (Egypt) Malak Amr Mostafa
- (Spain) Sandra Aguilar
- (Spain) Artemi Gavezou Castro
- (Spain) Elena Lopez
- (Spain) Lourdes Mohedano
- (Spain) Alejandra Quereda Flores
- (Finland) Riikka Kangas
- (Finland) Sonja Kokkonen
- (Finland) Heleri Kolkkanen
- (Finland) Elina Koprinen
- (Finland) Kristina Lapina
- (Finland) Aino Purje
- (France) Samantha Ay
- (France) Noemie Balthazard
- (France) Elena Chabert
- (France) Oceane Charoy
- (France) Marine Letul
- (France) Lea Peinoit
- (Germany) Judith Hauser
- (Germany) Anastasija Khmelnytska
- (Germany) Daniela Potapova
- (Germany) Dara Sajfutdinova
- (Germany) Julia Stavickaja
- (Germany) Rana Tokmak
- (Greece) Eleni Doika
- (Greece) Anastasia Giouvanaki
- (Greece) Zoi Kontogianni
- (Greece) Stefania Mitsana
- (Greece) Stavroula Samara
- (Greece) Lamprini Vlachogianni
- (Hungary) Blanka Boldizsar
- (Hungary) Csinszka Horvath
- (Hungary) Reka Lakatos
- (Hungary) Laura Ludanyi
- (Hungary) Emma Sipos
- (Hungary) Vivien Wehovszky
- (Israel) Yuval Filo
- (Israel) Alona Koshevatskiy
- (Israel) Ekaterina Levina
- (Israel) Karina Lykhvar
- (Israel) Ida Mayrin
- (Italy) Arianna Facchinetti
- (Italy) Sofia Lodi
- (Italy) Alessia Maurelli
- (Italy) Marta Pagnini
- (Italy) Camilla Patriarca
- (Italy) Andreea Stefanescu
- (Japan) Airi Hatakeyama
- (Japan) Mao Kunii
- (Japan) Rie Matsubara
- (Japan) Sakura Noshitani
- (Japan) Sayuri Sugimoto
- (Japan) Kiko Yokota
- (South Korea) Yeon Jung Kim
- (South Korea) Jiwoo Lee
- (South Korea) Kyung Eun Lee
- (South Korea) Na Young Lee
- (South Korea) Hyun Jin Yang
- (Latvia) Inese Jastrebova
- (Latvia) Kitija Kausa
- (Latvia) Eliza Osmucniece
- (Latvia) Jevgenija Sepele
- (Latvia) Katrine Silina
- (Latvia) Paula Zaunere
- (Mexico) Diana Casillas
- (Mexico) Nelly Gonzalez Llanos
- (Mexico) Erandeni Nava
- (Mexico) Maria Eugenia Nava del Rio
- (Mexico) Marialicia Ortega Elizondo
- (Mexico) Alondra Rodriguez
- (Poland) Dagmara Bak
- (Poland) Zuzanna Klajman
- (Poland) Aleksandra Kubiak
- (Poland) Julia Namaczynska
- (Poland) Natalia Sobolewska
- (Poland) Lilianna Walczak
- (Portugal) Maria Costa
- (Portugal) Ana Rita Farinha Barata
- (Portugal) Anzhelika Faydevych
- (Portugal) Beatriz M. S. Goncalves Tojal
- (Portugal) Mafalda Matos
- (Portugal) Ines Pedro Ventura
- (Russia) Daria Avtonomova
- (Russia) Diana Borisova
- (Russia) Anastasiia Maksimova
- (Russia) Aleksandra Semenova
- (Russia) Anastasiia Tatareva
- (Russia) Maria Tolkacheva
- (Switzerland) Stephanie Kaelin
- (Switzerland) Julia Eva Novak
- (Switzerland) Lisa Rusconi
- (Switzerland) Tamara Stanisic
- (Switzerland) Anne Tardent
- (Switzerland) Nicole Turuani
- (Thailand) Phasika Chetsadalak
- (Thailand) Spanna Piyasangcharoen
- (Thailand) Patarathida Ratanasatien
- (Thailand) Iriya Rungrueang
- (Thailand) Waleeporn Taengmanee
- (Turkey) Ezgi Bozdemir
- (Turkey) Gulce Cagdas
- (Turkey) Eda Coskun
- (Turkey) Ece Mumcuoglu
- (Turkey) Burcin Neziroglu
- (Turkey) Asya Nur Tas
- (Ukraine) Oleksandra Aslanyan
- (Ukraine) Olena Dmytrash
- (Ukraine) Oleksandra Gridasova
- (Ukraine) Valeriia Gudym
- (Ukraine) Olha Mykhalchuk
- (Ukraine) Anastasiya Voznyak
- (United States) Kiana Eide
- (United States) Alisa Kano
- (United States) Natalie Mc Giffert
- (United States) Jennifer Rokhman
- (United States) Monica Rokhman
- (United States) Kristen Shaldybin
- (Uzbekistan) Samira Amirova
- (Uzbekistan) Luiza Ganieva
- (Uzbekistan) Olga Kiryakova
- (Uzbekistan) Zarina Kurbonova
- (Uzbekistan) Evgeniya Larionova
- (Uzbekistan) Marta Rostoburova

=== All-Around ===
Place	Nation	10	3 + 2	Total
1st place, gold medalist(s)	Bulgaria	17.133 (3)	17.316 (3)	34.449
2nd place, silver medalist(s)	Italy	17.216 (1)	17.066 (4)	34.282
3rd place, bronze medalist(s)	Belarus	16.750	17.383 (2)	34.133
4	Russia	16.133	17.816 (1)	33.949
5	Israel	16.800	16.966	33.766
6	Azerbaijan	16.466	16.866	33.332
7	Ukraine	16.400	16.716	33.116
8	Japan	16.100	16.633	32.733
9	Germany	16.433	16.116	32.549
10	China	16.266	16.233	32.499
11	Spain	17.183 (2)	14.733	31.916
12	Greece	16.233	15.466	31.699
13	Switzerland	15.450	15.383	30.833
14	United States	15.633	15.050	30.683
15	Brazil	15.283	15.200	30.483
16	Uzbekistan	15.850	14.266	30.116
17	Finland	15.466	14.116	29.582
18	France	13.800	15.716	29.516
19	South Korea	14.050	13.783	27.833
20	Poland	12.750	14.216	26.966
21	Canada	13.916	12.441	26.357
22	Portugal	13.966	12.208	26.174
23	Mexico	12.800	13.116	25.916
24	Egypt	13.116	12.650	25.766
25	Hungary	14.200	11.425	25.625
26	Latvia	13.866	11.616	25.482
27	Czech Republic	13.816	11.350	25.166
28	Austria	13.008	12.116	25.124
29	Turkey	12.483	12.433	24.916
30	Thailand	7.950	7.316	15.266
31	Angola	8.058	6.558	14.616

=== 10 Clubs ===
Rank	Nation	D Score	E Score	Pen.	Total
1st place, gold medalist(s)	Spain	8.800	8.633		17.433
2nd place, silver medalist(s)	Israel	8.550	8.433		16.983
3rd place, bronze medalist(s)	Belarus	8.400	8.200		16.600
4	Bulgaria	8.450	8.133		16.583
5	Italy	8.300	8.066		16.366
6	Ukraine	8.000	8.066		16.066
7	Germany	7.950	8.033		15.983
8	Azerbaijan	7.750	7.666		15.416

=== 3 Balls + 2 Ribbons ===
Rank	Nation	D Score	E Score	Pen.	Total
1st place, gold medalist(s)	Russia	9.050	8.900		17.950
2nd place, silver medalist(s)	Bulgaria	8.850	8.766		17.616
3rd place, bronze medalist(s)	Belarus	8.800	8.666		17.466
4	Ukraine	8.500	8.500		17.000
4	Italy	8.600	8.400		17.000
6	Israel	8.350	8.500		16.850
7	Japan	8.400	8.400	0.05	16.750
8	Azerbaijan	8.275	8.333		16.608

== Medal table ==
Rank	Nation	Gold	Silver	Bronze	Total
1	Russia	8	4	0	12
2	Bulgaria	1	1	0	2
3	Spain	1	0	0	1
4	Belarus	0	1	4	5
5	Israel	0	1	0	1
5	Italy	0	1	0	1
7	Ukraine	0	0	4	4
8	South Korea	0	0	1	1
Totals (8 entries)		10	8	9	27
