= Gymnastics at the 2016 Summer Olympics =

Gymnastics at the Games of the XXXI Olympiad
- Pictograms for artistic gymnastics (left), rhythmic gymnastics (center), and trampolining (right)
- Venue: Arena Olímpica do Rio
- Dates: 6–21 August 2016
- No. of events: 18
- Competitors: from 63 nations

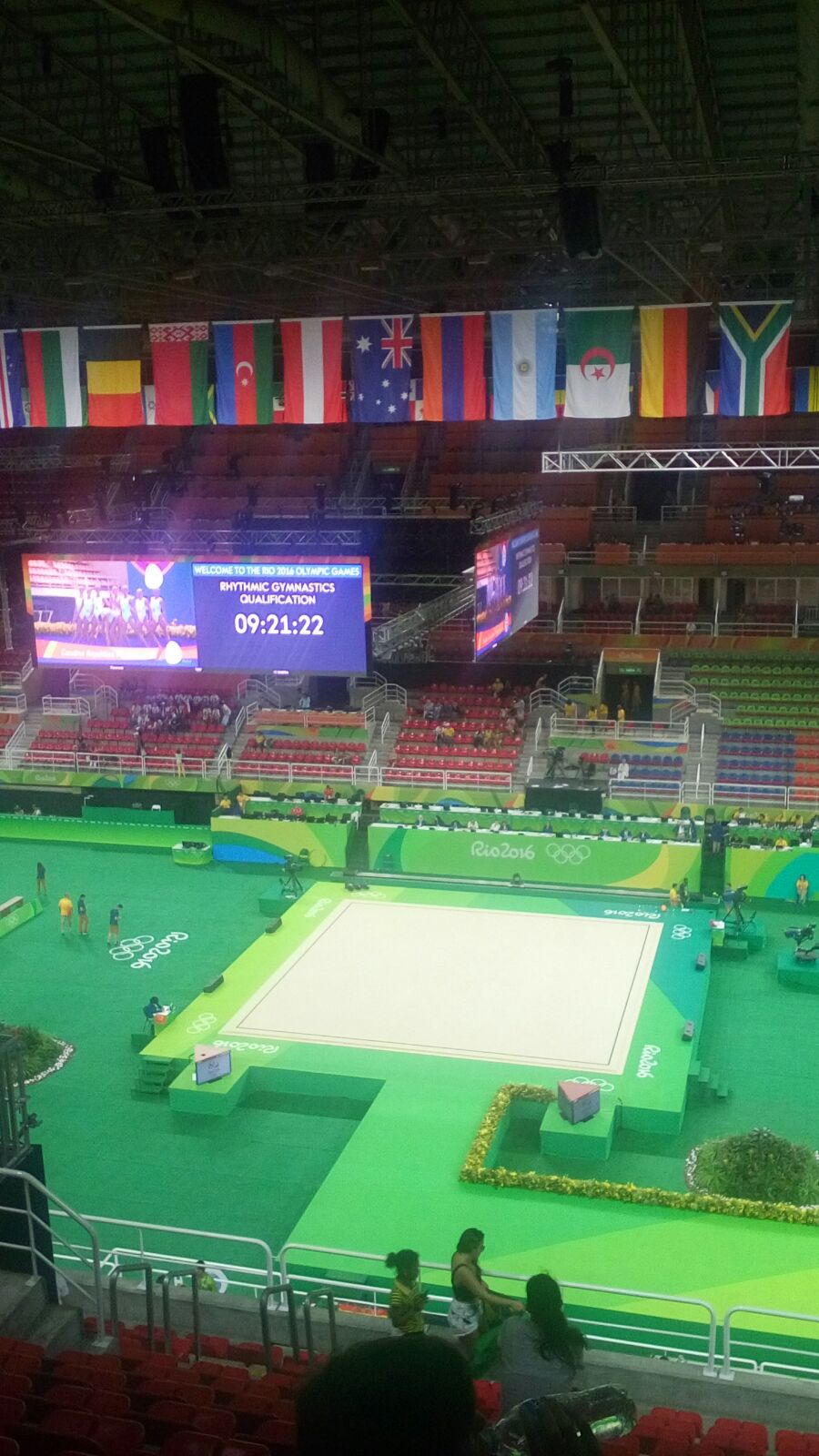
Arena Olímpica prior to the rhythmic gymnastics competition.

Gymnastics at the 2016 Summer Olympics in Rio de Janeiro was held in three categories: artistic gymnastics, rhythmic gymnastics and trampolining. All gymnastics events were staged at the Arena Olímpica do Rio from 6 to 21 August 2016.

== Qualification ==
Qualification was based on the results of the 2015 World Artistic Gymnastics Championships, held in Glasgow, Scotland, from 24 October to 1 November 2015; the 2015 World Rhythmic Gymnastics Championships, held in Stuttgart, Germany, from 7 to 13 September 2015; the 2015 Trampoline World Championships, held in Odense, Denmark, from 25 to 28 November 2015; and the Olympic Test Event, held on 16–22 April 2016 at Arena Olímpica do Rio.

== Schedule ==
Q	Qualification	F	Final

Artistic (HSBC Arena)
Event↓/Date →	Sat 6	Sun 7	Mon 8	Tue 9	Wed 10	Thur 11	Sun 14	Mon 15	Tue 16
Men's individual all-around	Q				F				
Men's team all-around	Q		F						
Men's vault	Q							F	
Men's floor	Q						F		
Men's pommel horse	Q						F		
Men's rings	Q							F	
Men's parallel bars	Q								F
Men's horizontal bar	Q								F
Women's individual all-around		Q				F			
Women's team all-around		Q		F					
Women's vault		Q					F		
Women's balance beam		Q						F	
Women's uneven bars		Q					F		
Women's floor		Q							F

Rhythmic (HSBC Arena)
Event↓/Date →	Fri 19	Sat 20	Sun 21
Individual all-around	Q	F	
Group all-around		Q	F

Trampoline (HSBC Arena)
Event↓/Date →	Fri 12		Sat 13	
Men			Q	F
Women	Q	F		

== Participation ==
=== Participating nations ===
Brazil, as the host country, receives a guaranteed spot, in case it were not to earn one by the regular qualifying methods.

- Algeria (2)
- Argentina (2)
- Armenia (3)
- Australia (3)
- Austria (1)
- Azerbaijan (3)
- Belarus (12)
- Belgium (6)
- Brazil (17)
- Bulgaria (6)
- Canada (8)
- Cape Verde (1)
- Chile (2)
- China (20)
- Colombia (2)
- Croatia (2)
- Cuba (3)
- Cyprus (1)
- Czech Republic (1)
- Egypt (1)
- Finland (2)
- France (13)
- Georgia (2)
- Germany (17)
- Great Britain (13)
- Greece (9)
- Guatemala (1)
- Hungary (2)
- Iceland (1)
- India (1)
- Ireland (2)
- Israel (7)
- Italy (12)
- Jamaica (1)
- Japan (19)
- Kazakhstan (2)
- Lithuania (1)
- Mexico (2)
- Monaco (1)
- Netherlands (10)
- New Zealand (3)
- North Korea (2)
- Norway (1)
- Panama (1)
- Peru (1)
- Poland (1)
- Portugal (3)
- Romania (4)
- Russia (20)
- Slovakia (1)
- Slovenia (1)
- South Africa (1)
- South Korea (7)
- Spain (9)
- Sweden (1)
- Switzerland (6)
- Trinidad and Tobago (1)
- Turkey (2)
- Ukraine (13)
- United States (18)
- Uzbekistan (9)
- Venezuela (1)
- Vietnam (2)

== Medal table ==
* Host nation (Brazil)

Rank	Nation	Gold	Silver	Bronze	Total
1	United States	4	6	2	12
2	Russia	3	5	3	11
3	Great Britain	2	2	3	7
4	Japan	2	0	1	3
5	Ukraine	1	1	1	3
6	Germany	1	0	1	2
7	Belarus	1	0	0	1
7	Canada	1	0	0	1
7	Greece	1	0	0	1
7	Netherlands	1	0	0	1
7	North Korea	1	0	0	1
12	Brazil*	0	2	1	3
13	China	0	1	4	5
14	Spain	0	1	0	1
15	Bulgaria	0	0	1	1
15	Switzerland	0	0	1	1
Totals (16 entries)		18	18	18	54

== Events ==
=== Artistic gymnastics ===
==== Men's events ====
Games	Gold	Silver	Bronze
Team all-around	Japan (JPN); Kenzō Shirai; Yusuke Tanaka; Koji Yamamuro; Kōhei Uchimura; Ryōhei Katō	Russia (RUS); Denis Ablyazin; David Belyavskiy; Ivan Stretovich; Nikolai Kuksenkov; Nikita Nagornyy	China (CHN); Deng Shudi; Lin Chaopan; Liu Yang; You Hao; Zhang Chenglong
Individual all-around	Kōhei Uchimura; Japan	Oleg Verniaiev; Ukraine	Max Whitlock; Great Britain
Floor exercise	Max Whitlock; Great Britain	Diego Hypólito; Brazil	Arthur Mariano; Brazil
Pommel horse	Max Whitlock; Great Britain	Louis Smith; Great Britain	Alexander Naddour; United States
Rings	Eleftherios Petrounias; Greece	Arthur Zanetti; Brazil	Denis Ablyazin; Russia
Vault	Ri Se-gwang; North Korea	Denis Ablyazin; Russia	Kenzō Shirai; Japan
Parallel bars	Oleg Verniaiev; Ukraine	Danell Leyva; United States	David Belyavskiy; Russia
Horizontal bar	Fabian Hambüchen; Germany	Danell Leyva; United States	Nile Wilson; Great Britain

==== Women's events ====
For the first time since the 1972 Olympics, Romania did not win a medal in the women's team event, due to Romania's failure to qualify a team for the first time since 1968, ending a 40-year medal run.

Games	Gold	Silver	Bronze
Team all-around	United States (USA); Simone Biles; Gabby Douglas; Laurie Hernandez; Madison Kocian; Aly Raisman	Russia (RUS); Angelina Melnikova; Aliya Mustafina; Maria Paseka; Daria Spiridonova; Seda Tutkhalyan	China (CHN); Fan Yilin; Mao Yi; Shang Chunsong; Tan Jiaxin; Wang Yan
Individual all-around	Simone Biles; United States	Aly Raisman; United States	Aliya Mustafina; Russia
Vault	Simone Biles; United States	Maria Paseka; Russia	Giulia Steingruber; Switzerland
Uneven bars	Aliya Mustafina; Russia	Madison Kocian; United States	Sophie Scheder; Germany
Balance beam	Sanne Wevers; Netherlands	Laurie Hernandez; United States	Simone Biles; United States
Floor exercise	Simone Biles; United States	Aly Raisman; United States	Amy Tinkler; Great Britain

=== Rhythmic gymnastics ===
Games	Gold	Silver	Bronze
Group all-around	Russia; Vera Biryukova; Anastasia Bliznyuk; Anastasia Maksimova; Anastasia Tatareva; Maria Tolkacheva	Spain; Sandra Aguilar; Artemi Gavezou; Elena López; Lourdes Mohedano; Alejandra Quereda	Bulgaria; Reneta Kamberova; Lyubomira Kazanova; Mihaela Maevska-Velichkova; Tsvetelina Naydenova; Hristiana Todorova
Individual all-around	Margarita Mamun; Russia	Yana Kudryavtseva; Russia	Ganna Rizatdinova; Ukraine

=== Trampoline ===
Games	Gold	Silver	Bronze
Men's individual	Uladzislau Hancharou; Belarus	Dong Dong; China	Gao Lei; China
Women's individual	Rosie MacLennan; Canada	Bryony Page; Great Britain	Li Dan; China

== Gala ==
For the first time since 2008, a gala was held in gymnastics; it was held on 17 August 2016, following the completion of competition in the artistic disciplines. The exhibition event featured performances by artistic gymnasts who participated in Rio.
