= Ina Ananieva =

Bulgarian rhythmic gymnast and coach

- Full name: Ina Tosheva Ananieva
- Born: October 21, 1977 (age 48) Sofia

Gymnastics career
- Discipline: Rhythmic gymnastics
- Country represented: Bulgaria
- Club: Levski

Ina Ananieva (Bulgarian: Ина Ананиева) is a former Bulgarian gymnast and rhythmic gymnastics coach.

== Biography ==
In 1991, Ananieva won a silver medal as part of the Bulgarian team at the World Championships in Athens, Greece. In 2012, she was appointed as head coach of the Bulgarian rhythmic gymnasts. In 2014, Ananieva became the coach of the year in Bulgarian sports after the Bulgarian women won gold in the group all-around at the 2014 World Championships.

At the 2016 Summer Olympics in Rio de Janeiro, the Bulgarian ensemble won the bronze medal in the all-around under the leadership of Ananieva. The ensemble, consisting of Mihaela Maevska, Reneta Kamberova, Hristiana Todorova, Tsvetelina Naydenova and Lyubomira Kazanova, received a total of 35,766 points - 17,700 points in the five-ribbon combination and 18,066 points in the mixed-apparatus routine with two hoops and three pairs of clubs.

After the Olympic medal, the girls ended their sports careers. The ensemble was named Team of the Year, and Ananieva became Coach of the Year in Bulgaria for the second time. At the end of 2016, Ina Ananieva announced that she was leaving the coaching position due to personal reasons. In April 2017, she married for the second time. A few months later Ananieva gave birth to a girl. She has another daughter from her first marriage.
