= Bulgaria at the 2016 Summer Olympics =

- IOC code: BUL
- NOC: Bulgarian Olympic Committee
- Website: www.bgolympic.org (in Bulgarian and English)

in Rio de Janeiro
- Competitors: 51 in 14 sports
- Flag bearers: Ivet Lalova (opening); Mihaela Maevska (closing)
- Medals Ranked 65th: Gold 0 Silver 1 Bronze 2 Total 3

Summer Olympics appearances (overview)
- 1896; 1900–1920; 1924; 1928; 1932; 1936; 1948; 1952; 1956; 1960; 1964; 1968; 1972; 1976; 1980; 1984; 1988; 1992; 1996; 2000; 2004; 2008; 2012; 2016; 2020; 2024; 2028

Bulgaria competed at the 2016 Summer Olympics in Rio de Janeiro, Brazil, from 5 to 21 August 2016. Bulgaria made their official debut at the 1896 Summer Olympics in Athens. Bulgarian athletes had appeared in every edition of the Summer Olympics since 1924, except for three occasions: the 1948 Summer Olympics in London, and the 1932 and 1984 Summer Olympics in Los Angeles because of Bulgaria's actions in World War II, the worldwide Great Depression and the Soviet boycott, respectively.

The Bulgarian Olympic Committee fielded 51 athletes, 29 men and 22 women, across 14 sports at the Games. It was the nation's smallest delegation sent to the Olympics since 1956, due to the absence of the men's volleyball squad and the ban of 11 weightlifters over a widespread doping offense. Track and field and wrestling accounted for the largest number of athletes on the Bulgarian squad with 11 entries, nearly half of the nation's full roster size. There was only a single competitor each in road cycling, fencing, and modern pentathlon (the country's return to the sport at the Olympic Games after 16 years).

Sixteen Bulgarian athletes competed at London 2012, including four members of the rhythmic gymnastics squad (led by Mihaela Maevska-Velichkova, Albanian-born Elis Guri in Greco-Roman wrestling, pistol shooter and 2015 European Games silver medalist Antoaneta Boneva, and the country's fastest sprinter and two-time European champion Ivet Lalova-Collio in both the women's 100 and 200 metres). Heading to her fourth straight Olympics as the most experienced competitor, Lalova-Collio was selected by the committee to carry the Bulgarian flag at the opening ceremony, the second time by a female in the nation's Summer Olympic history.

Bulgaria returned home from Rio de Janeiro with only three medals (one silver and two bronze), marking a slight improvement from the nation's overall tally at the previous Games (not taking into account subsequent changes to the medal tallies for the 2012 Games due to doping violations). All of Bulgaria's medalists were women for the first time in history; a silver to high jumper Mirela Demireva, and a bronze each to the rhythmic gymnastics group in the group all-around and freestyle wrestler Elitsa Yankova in the women's 48 kg.

== Medalists ==
Medal	Name	Sport	Event	Date
Silver	Mirela Demireva	Athletics	Women's high jump	20 August
Bronze	Elitsa Yankova	Wrestling	Women's freestyle 48 kg	17 August
Bronze	Reneta Kamberova; Lyubomira Kazanova; Mihaela Maevska-Velichkova; Tsvetelina Naydenova; Hristiana Todorova	Gymnastics	Women's rhythmic group all-around	21 August

== Competitors ==
The following is the list of number of competitors participating in the Games:

Sport	Men	Women	Total
Athletics	5	6	11
Badminton	0	3	3
Boxing	2	1	3
Canoeing	2	0	2
Cycling	1	0	1
Fencing	1	0	1
Gymnastics	0	6	6
Judo	2	0	2
Modern pentathlon	1	0	1
Rowing	2	0	2
Shooting	2	1	3
Swimming	2	1	3
Tennis	1	1	2
Wrestling	8	3	11
Total	29	22	51

Medals by date
Day	Date	1st place, gold medalist(s)	2nd place, silver medalist(s)	3rd place, bronze medalist(s)	Total
Day 1	6 August	0	0	0	0
Day 2	7 August	0	0	0	0
Day 3	8 August	0	0	0	0
Day 4	9 August	0	0	0	0
Day 5	10 August	0	0	0	0
Day 6	11 August	0	0	0	0
Day 7	12 August	0	0	0	0
Day 8	13 August	0	0	0	0
Day 9	14 August	0	0	0	0
Day 10	15 August	0	0	0	0
Day 11	16 August	0	0	0	0
Day 12	17 August	0	0	1	1
Day 13	18 August	0	0	0	0
Day 14	19 August	0	0	0	0
Day 15	20 August	0	1	0	1
Day 16	21 August	0	0	1	1
Total		0	1	2	3

== Athletics ==
Bulgarian athletes achieved qualifying standards in the following athletics events (up to a maximum of 3 athletes in each event):

Key

- Note–Ranks given for track events are within the athlete's heat only
- Q = Qualified for the next round
- q = Qualified for the next round as a fastest loser or, in field events, by position without achieving the qualifying target
- NR = National record
- N/A = Round not applicable for the event
- Bye = Athlete not required to compete in round

Track & road events

Athlete	Event	Heat		Quarterfinal		Semifinal		Final	
Athlete	Event	Result	Rank	Result	Rank	Result	Rank	Result	Rank
Mitko Tsenov	Men's 3000 m steeplechase	8:54.79	14	—N/a				Did not advance	
Silvia Danekova	Women's 3000 m steeplechase	DNS		—N/a				Did not advance	
Ivet Lalova	Women's 100 m	Bye		11.35	3 Q	DNS		Did not advance	
Ivet Lalova	Women's 200 m	22.61	1 Q	—N/a		22.42	2 Q	22.69	8
Militsa Mircheva	Women's marathon	—N/a						2:51:06	108

Field events
Men

Athlete	Event	Qualification		Final	
Athlete	Event	Distance	Position	Distance	Position
Rumen Dimitrov	Triple jump	16.36	26	Did not advance	
Georgi Ivanov	Shot put	19.49	25	Did not advance	
Tihomir Ivanov	High jump	2.29	1 Q	2.29	10
Georgi Tsonov	Triple jump	15.20	39	Did not advance	

Women

Athlete	Event	Qualification		Final	
Athlete	Event	Distance	Position	Distance	Position
Mirela Demireva	High jump	1.94	9 Q	1.97	2nd place, silver medalist(s)
Radoslava Mavrodieva	Shot put	17.20	21	Did not advance	
Gabriela Petrova	Triple jump	13.92	22	Did not advance	

== Badminton ==
Bulgaria qualified three badminton players for each of the following events into the Olympic tournament. Linda Zechiri was selected among the top 34 individual shuttlers in the women's singles, while sisters Gabriela and Stefani Stoeva secured the women's doubles spot by virtue of their top 16 finish in the BWF World Rankings as of 5 May 2016.

Athlete	Event	Group Stage				Elimination	Quarterfinal	Semifinal	Final / BM	
Athlete	Event	Opposition Score	Opposition Score	Opposition Score	Rank	Opposition Score	Opposition Score	Opposition Score	Opposition Score	Rank
Linda Zechiri	Women's singles	Gilmour (GBR); W (12–21, 21–17, 21–16)	Jaquet (SUI); W (21–17, 21–15)	—N/a	1 Q	Sung J-h (KOR); L (15–21, 12–21)	Did not advance			
Gabriela Stoeva; Stefani Stoeva	Women's doubles	Tang Yt / Yu Y (CHN); L (14–21, 11–21)	Chang Y-n / Lee S-h (KOR); L (22–24, 15–21)	Goliszewski / Nelte (GER); W (21–14, 21–19)	3	—N/a	Did not advance			

== Boxing ==
Bulgaria entered three boxers to compete in each of the following weight classes into the Olympic boxing tournament. Stanimira Petrova had claimed her Olympic spot with a semifinal victory at the 2016 European Qualification Tournament in Samsun, Turkey, while Daniel Asenov and Simeon Chamov secured additional places on the Bulgarian roster at the 2016 AIBA World Qualifying Tournament in Baku, Azerbaijan.

Athlete	Event	Round of 32	Round of 16	Quarterfinals	Semifinals	Final	
Athlete	Event	Opposition Result	Opposition Result	Opposition Result	Opposition Result	Opposition Result	Rank
Daniel Asenov	Men's flyweight	Martínez (ARG); W 2–1	Flissi (ALG); L 0–3	Did not advance			
Simeon Chamov	Men's welterweight	Şipal (TUR); W 3–0	Adi (THA); L 0–3	Did not advance			
Stanimira Petrova	Women's flyweight	—N/a	Kob (UKR); L 1–2	Did not advance			

== Canoeing ==
=== Sprint ===
Bulgaria qualified a single boat in the men's K-1 1000 m for the Games through the 2015 ICF Canoe Sprint World Championships. Meanwhile, one additional boat has been awarded to the Bulgarian squad in men's C-1 1000 m by virtue of a top two national finish at the 2016 European Qualification Regatta in Duisburg, Germany.

Athlete	Event	Heats		Semifinals		Final	
Athlete	Event	Time	Rank	Time	Rank	Time	Rank
Miroslav Kirchev	Men's K-1 1000 m	3:39.363	6	Did not advance			
Angel Kodinov	Men's C-1 200 m	42.694	4 Q	42.925	7	Did not advance	
Angel Kodinov	Men's C-1 1000 m	4:27.904	5 Q	4:30.574	6 FB	4:10.102	14

Qualification Legend: FA = Qualify to final (medal); FB = Qualify to final B (non-medal)

== Cycling ==
=== Road ===
Bulgaria qualified one rider in the men's Olympic road race by virtue of his top 200 individual ranking in the 2015 UCI Europe Tour.

Athlete	Event	Time	Rank
Stefan Hristov	Men's road race	Did not finish	

== Fencing ==
Bulgaria entered one fencer into the Olympic competition. Pancho Paskov had claimed his Olympic spot in the men's sabre by finishing among the top four individuals at the European Zonal Qualifier in Prague, Czech Republic.

Athlete	Event	Round of 32	Round of 16	Quarterfinal	Semifinal	Final / BM	
Athlete	Event	Opposition Score	Opposition Score	Opposition Score	Opposition Score	Opposition Score	Rank
Pancho Paskov	Men's sabre	Yakimenko (RUS); W 15–14	Szabo (GER); L 6–15	Did not advance			

== Gymnastics ==
=== Rhythmic ===
Bulgaria qualified a squad of rhythmic gymnasts for the individual and group all-around by finishing in the top 15 (for individual) and top 10 (for group) at the 2015 World Championships in Stuttgart, Germany.

Athlete	Event	Qualification						Final					
Athlete	Event	Hoop	Ball	Clubs	Ribbon	Total	Rank	Hoop	Ball	Clubs	Ribbon	Total	Rank
Neviana Vladinova	Individual	17.666	17.700	17.800	17.800	70.966	6 Q	17.883	17.750	18.050	17.050	70.733	7

Athlete	Event	Qualification				Final			
Athlete	Event	5 ribbons	3 clubs 2 hoops	Total	Rank	5 ribbons	3 clubs 2 hoops	Total	Rank
Reneta Kamberova; Lyubomira Kazanova; Mihaela Maevska-Velichkova; Tsvetelina Naydenova; Hristiana Todorova	Team	17.566	16.616	34.182	7 Q	17.700	18.066	35.766	3rd place, bronze medalist(s)

== Judo ==
Bulgaria qualified two judokas for each of the following weight classes at the Games. Ivaylo Ivanov was ranked among the top 22 eligible judokas for men in the IJF World Ranking List of 30 May 2016, while Yanislav Gerchev at men's extra-lightweight (60 kg) earned a continental quota spot from the European region as Bulgaria's top-ranked judoka outside of direct qualifying position.

Athlete	Event	Round of 64	Round of 32	Round of 16	Quarterfinals	Semifinals	Repechage	Final / BM	
Athlete	Event	Opposition Result	Opposition Result	Opposition Result	Opposition Result	Opposition Result	Opposition Result	Opposition Result	Rank
Yanislav Gerchev	Men's −60 kg	Bye	Tsai M-y (TPE); W 110–000	Papinashvili (GEO); L 000–100	Did not advance				
Ivaylo Ivanov	Men's −81 kg	Bye	de Wit (NED); W 110–000	Lee S-s (KOR); W 010–000	Stevens (USA); L 000–100	Did not advance	Marconcini (ITA); L 000–100	Did not advance	7

== Modern pentathlon ==
Bulgaria received an invitation from UIPM to send Dimitar Krastanov in the men's modern pentathlon to the Olympics, as one of the next highest-ranked eligible individuals, not yet qualified, at the 2015 European Championships, signifying the nation's return to the sport for the first time since 2000.

Athlete	Event	Fencing (épée one touch)				Swimming (200 m freestyle)			Riding (show jumping)			Combined: shooting/running (10 m air pistol)/(3200 m)			Total points	Final rank
Athlete	Event	RR	BR	Rank	MP points	Time	Rank	MP points	Penalties	Rank	MP points	Time	Rank	MP Points	Total points	Final rank
Dimitar Krastanov	Men's	19–16	1	14	214	2:04.96	19	326	EL	33	0	11:02.95	2	638	1179	33

== Rowing ==
Bulgaria qualified one boat in the men's double sculls for the Olympics at the 2015 FISA World Championships in Lac d'Aiguebelette, France.

Athlete	Event	Heats		Repechage		Semifinals		Final	
Athlete	Event	Time	Rank	Time	Rank	Time	Rank	Time	Rank
Georgi Bozhilov; Kristian Vasilev	Men's double sculls	6:44:31	4 R	6:20.56	2 SA/B	6:47.00	6 FB	7:00.85	9

Qualification Legend: FA=Final A (medal); FB=Final B (non-medal); FC=Final C (non-medal); FD=Final D (non-medal); FE=Final E (non-medal); FF=Final F (non-medal); SA/B=Semifinals A/B; SC/D=Semifinals C/D; SE/F=Semifinals E/F; QF=Quarterfinals; R=Repechage

== Shooting ==
Bulgarian shooters achieved quota places for the following events by virtue of their best finishes at the 2014 and 2015 ISSF World Championships, the 2015 ISSF World Cup series, and European Championships or Games, as long as they obtained a minimum qualifying score (MQS) by 31 March 2016.

Athlete	Event	Qualification		Semifinal		Final	
Athlete	Event	Points	Rank	Points	Rank	Points	Rank
Samuil Donkov	Men's 10 m air pistol	572	34	—N/a		Did not advance	
Samuil Donkov	Men's 50 m pistol	541	32	—N/a		Did not advance	
Anton Rizov	Men's 10 m air rifle	617.3	42	—N/a		Did not advance	
Anton Rizov	Men's 50 m rifle prone	621.2	27	—N/a		Did not advance	
Anton Rizov	Men's 50 m rifle 3 positions	1161	35	—N/a		Did not advance	
Antoaneta Boneva	Women's 10 m air pistol	371	41	—N/a		Did not advance	
Antoaneta Boneva	Women's 25 m pistol	583	5 Q	11	8	Did not advance	

Qualification Legend: Q = Qualify for the next round; q = Qualify for the bronze medal (shotgun)

== Swimming ==
Bulgarian swimmers achieved qualifying standards in the following events (up to a maximum of 2 swimmers in each event at the Olympic Qualifying Time (OQT), and potentially 1 at the Olympic Selection Time (OST)):

Athlete	Event	Heat		Semifinal		Final	
Athlete	Event	Time	Rank	Time	Rank	Time	Rank
Ventsislav Aydarski	Men's 10 km open water	—N/a				1:53:16.1	15
Aleksandar Nikolov	Men's 100 m freestyle	50.08	41	Did not advance			
Nina Rangelova	Women's 100 m freestyle	55.71	31	Did not advance			
Nina Rangelova	Women's 200 m freestyle	1:58.57	22	Did not advance			

== Tennis ==
Bulgaria entered two tennis players into the Olympic tournament. London 2012 Olympian Grigor Dimitrov (world no. 36) qualified directly for the men's singles as one of the top 56 eligible players based on the ATP World Rankings, while Tsvetana Pironkova (world no. 71) had claimed one of six ITF Olympic women's singles places, as Bulgaria's top-ranked tennis player outside of direct qualifying position in the WTA World Rankings as of 6 June 2016.

Athlete	Event	Round of 64	Round of 32	Round of 16	Quarterfinals	Semifinals	Final / BM	
Athlete	Event	Opposition Score	Opposition Score	Opposition Score	Opposition Score	Opposition Score	Opposition Score	Rank
Grigor Dimitrov	Men's singles	Čilić (CRO); L 1–6, 4–6	Did not advance					
Tsvetana Pironkova	Women's singles	Siegemund (GER); L 6–1, 4–6, 2–6	Did not advance					

== Wrestling ==
Bulgaria qualified a total of eleven wrestlers for each the following weight classes into the Olympic competition. Three Olympic berths were awarded to Bulgarian wrestlers, who finished among the top six at the 2015 World Championships, while five more had booked Olympic spots with their semifinal triumphs at the 2016 European Qualification Tournament.

Three further wrestlers had claimed the remaining Olympic slots to round out the Bulgarian roster at the initial meet of the World Qualification Tournament in Ulaanbaatar.

On 11 May 2016, United World Wrestling awarded an additional Olympic license to Bulgaria in men's freestyle 125 kg, as a response to the doping violations for both the Belarusian and Ukrainian wrestler at the European Qualification Tournament.

Key:

- VT – Victory by Fall.
- PP – Decision by Points – the loser with technical points.
- PO – Decision by Points – the loser without technical points.
- ST – Decision by points – the loser without technical points and a margin of victory of at least 8 (Greco-Roman) or 10 (freestyle) points.
- SP – Decision by points – the loser with technical points and a margin of victory of at least 8 (Greco-Roman) or 10 (freestyle) points.

Men's freestyle

Athlete	Event	Qualification	Round of 16	Quarterfinal	Semifinal	Repechage 1	Repechage 2	Final / BM	
Athlete	Event	Opposition Result	Opposition Result	Opposition Result	Opposition Result	Opposition Result	Opposition Result	Opposition Result	Rank
Vladimir Dubov	−57 kg	Bye	Dennis (USA); W 4–0 ^{ST}	Guidea (ROU); W 5–0 ^{VT}	Khinchegashvili (GEO); L 1–3 ^{PP}	Bye		Aliyev (AZE); L 1–3 ^{PP}	5
Borislav Novachkov	−65 kg	Nasiri (IRI); W 3–1 ^{PP}	Gómez (PUR); L 1–3 ^{PP}	Did not advance					8
Georgi Ivanov	−74 kg	Bye	Makarashvili (GEO); L 1–3 ^{PP}	Did not advance					12
Mihail Ganev	−86 kg	Orgodol (MGL); W 5–0 ^{VT}	Karimi (IRI); L 1–3 ^{PP}	Did not advance					8
Dimitar Kumchev	−125 kg	Petriashvili (GEO); L 0–4 ^{ST}	Did not advance						18

Men's Greco-Roman

Athlete	Event	Qualification	Round of 16	Quarterfinal	Semifinal	Repechage 1	Repechage 2	Final / BM	
Athlete	Event	Opposition Result	Opposition Result	Opposition Result	Opposition Result	Opposition Result	Opposition Result	Opposition Result	Rank
Daniel Aleksandrov	−75 kg	Julfalakyan (ARM); W 3–1 ^{PP}	Bácsi (HUN); L 0–4 ^{ST}	Did not advance					11
Nikolay Bayryakov	−85 kg	Bye	Boudjemline (ALG); W 3–0 ^{PO}	Beleniuk (UKR); L 1–4 ^{SP}	Did not advance	Bye	Othman (EGY); W 3–1 ^{PP}	Hamzatau (BLR); L 1–3 ^{PP}	5
Elis Guri	−98 kg	Haloui (ALG); W 4–0 ^{ST}	Nadareishvili (GEO); W 3–1 ^{PP}	Schön (SWE); L 0–4 ^{ST}	Did not advance				7

Women's freestyle

Athlete	Event	Qualification	Round of 16	Quarterfinal	Semifinal	Repechage 1	Repechage 2	Final / BM	
Athlete	Event	Opposition Result	Opposition Result	Opposition Result	Opposition Result	Opposition Result	Opposition Result	Opposition Result	Rank
Elitsa Yankova	−48 kg	Muambo (CMR); W 4–0 ^{ST}	Dadasheva (RUS); W 3–1 ^{PP}	Castillo (COL); W 3–1 ^{PP}	Stadnik (AZE); L 0–5 ^{VT}	Bye		Bermudez (ARG); W 3–1 ^{PP}	3rd place, bronze medalist(s)
Mimi Hristova	−58 kg	Pürevdorj (MGL); L 1–3 ^{PP}	Did not advance						15
Taybe Yusein	−63 kg	Bye	Pirozhkova (USA); L 1–3 ^{PP}	Did not advance					13

== See also ==
- Bulgaria at the 2016 Summer Paralympics
