= Rana Tokmak =

German rhythmic gymnast

- Born: 16 July 1996 (age 30) Castrop-Rauxel, Germany

Gymnastics career
- Discipline: Rhythmic gymnastics
- Country represented: Germany (2013-2016)
- Club: TV Wattenscheid 01
- Head coaches: Natalia Stsiapanava, Ekaterina Kotelikova
- Retired: yes

Rana Tokmak (born 16 Juli 1996) is a former German rhythmic gymnast. From 2013 to 2016 she trained with the national team group at the federal base in Fellbach.

== Personal life ==
From the end of 2012 to 2015, Tokmak was an ambassador for the "spin - sport intercultural" project, which promoted the integration of young women and girls in particular through sport. Since 2016 she has been the official integration ambassador of the State Sports Association of North Rhine-Westphalia and continues to volunteer for integration through sport.

With her quote “Anyone who has a homeland, every trip is an enrichment.” Rana Tokmak was part of the “Inspiration” project of the KulturRegion Stuttgart alongside Friedrich Schiller, Robert Bosch and Gottlieb Daimler.

In addition, Tokmak participated three times in a row with her paintings in the "European Youth Art Exhibition" in 2012, 2014 and 2016.

== Career ==
=== Junior ===
In 2009 Tokmak competed for the first time as a junior at the German championships and became All-Around and ball champion. She won silver with rope, hoop and clubs behind Lea Godejohann.

In 2010, at the German junior championships, Tokmak once again won the All-Around as well as with rope, hoop and ball. She took third place with clubs. She was also nominated that year as a reserve gymnast for the Junior European Championships in Bremen.

In 2011 she won the national qualification for the Junior European Championships in Minsk along the junior group, where they finished 13th. She was therefore unable to take part in the German Individual Championships.

=== Senior ===
Tokmak has been competing in seniors since 2012 and was able to immediately win silver on her debut in the category. In the apparatus finals, she finished third with hoop, ball and clubs and fourth with ribbon.

In early 2013, Rana moved to the federal base in Fellbach near Stuttgart and thus became part of the national group. At the World Championships in Kyiv in the same year, she was part of the newly formed German group, which included Tokmak, Judith Hauser, Anastasia Kempf, Anastasija Khmelnytska, Daniela Potapova and Sara Radman, ranked 9th in the All-Around and 7th in the club final.

At the 2014 European Championships in Baku, the group with Hauser, Khmelnytska, Nicole Müller, Potapova and Tokmak finished 11th in the All-Around and 8th in 10 clubs final. In the same year, Rana started with Julia Stavickaja, Darja Sajfutdinova, Judith Hauser, Anastasija Khmelnytska and Daniela Potapova at the World Championships in Izmir. They finished 9th in the All-Around and 7th in the clubs final.

In 2015, the German national team took part in the European Games. They placed 8th in the All-Around and a 4th with five ribbons.

In the same year, Tokmak was named captain of the national team and the group took part in the home World Championships in Stuttgart, where they finished 10th in the All-Around, just short of direct Olympic qualification.

In April 2016, the team with Rana Tokmak competed in the 2nd Olympic qualifications in Rio de Janeiro, the so-called "Test Event", the group won the gold medal and subsequently qualified for the 2016 Summer Olympics in Brazil.

Tokmak announced her retirement from the team in July 2016, officially ending her athletic career as a competitive athlete.
