= Anastasija Grišanina =

Lithuanian gymnast (born 1996)

- Born: 9 December 1996 (age 29)

Gymnastics career
- Discipline: Rhythmic gymnastics
- Country represented: Lithuania (2014)

Anastasija Grišanina (born 9 December 1996) is a Lithuanian individual rhythmic gymnast. She represents her nation at international competitions. She competed at world championships, including at the 2014 World Rhythmic Gymnastics Championships.
