= 2013 Asian Rhythmic Gymnastics Championships =

International rhythmic gymnastics competition

The 6th Rhythmic Gymnastics Asian Championships was held in Tashkent, Uzbekistan from 5–8 June 2013.

== Medal winners ==
Event	Gold	Silver	Bronze
All-around Finals
Team	Uzbekistan; Valeriya Davidova; Mayya Filippova; Djamila Rakhmatova; Maftuna Shamsieva	South Korea; Chun Song E Lee Da-ae; Gim Yun-hee; Son Yeon-Jae	China; Deng Senyue; Hua Suong Suong; Yang Yuqing; Ma Qianhui
Individual	Son Yeon-Jae; South Korea	Djamila Rakhmatova; Uzbekistan	Deng Senyue; China
Apparatus Finals
Hoop	Son Yeon-Jae; South Korea	Deng Senyue; China	Djamila Rakhmatova; Uzbekistan
Ball	Deng Senyue; China	Djamila Rakhmatova; Uzbekistan	Mayya Filippova; Uzbekistan
Clubs	Son Yeon-Jae; South Korea	Deng Senyue; China	Djamila Rakhmatova; Uzbekistan
Ribbon	Deng Senyue; China	Son Yeon-Jae; South Korea	Djamila Rakhmatova; Uzbekistan
Group Finals
Group All-around	China; Zhao Jingnan; Zhang Ling; Zhang Doudou; Yang Ye; Ding Ziyi; Bao Yuqing	Japan; Airi Hatakeyama; Nina Saeedyokota; Rie Matsubara; Sayuri Sugimoto; Midori Kahata; Sakura Noshitani	Uzbekistan; Ekaterina Bukhenko; Luiza Ganieva; Olga Kiryakova; Zarina Kurbonova; Marta Rostoburova; Darya Svechnikova
10 Clubs	Japan	China	Uzbekistan
3 Balls + 2 Ribbon	China	Japan	Kazakhstan

== Medal table ==
Rank	Nation	Gold	Silver	Bronze	Total
1	China (CHN)	4	3	2	9
2	South Korea (KOR)	3	2	0	5
3	Uzbekistan (UZB)	1	2	6	9
4	Japan (JPN)	1	2	0	3
5	Kazakhstan (KAZ)	0	0	1	1
Totals (5 entries)		9	9	9	27
