= Marie Therese Ruud =

Norwegian rhythmic gymnast

- Full name: Marie Therese Ruud
- Born: 17 May 1997 (age 29)

Gymnastics career
- Discipline: Rhythmic gymnastics
- Country represented: Norway (2014)

Marie Therese Ruud (born 17 May 1997) is a Norwegian individual rhythmic gymnast who competes internationally. She has represented her country at major events, including at the 2014 World Rhythmic Gymnastics Championships. That same year, she also won the silver medal at the Norwegian Championships.
