= Karolina Sklenytė =

Lithuanian rhythmic gymnast (born 1996)

Karolina Sklenyte
- Born: 11 March 1996 (age 30)

Gymnastics career
- Discipline: Rhythmic gymnastics
- Country represented: Lithuania (2014)

Karolina Sklenyte (born 11 March 1996) is a Lithuanian individual rhythmic gymnast. She represents her nation at international competitions. She competed at world championships, including at the 2014 World Rhythmic Gymnastics Championships.
