= Sina Tkaltschewitsch =

German rhythmic gymnast

Personal information
- Nationality: German
- Born: 5 May 1999 (age 26)
- Height: 160 cm (5 ft 3 in)
- Weight: 44 kg (97 lb)

Sport
- Country: Germany
- Sport: Rhythmic gymnastics

Sina Tkaltschewitsch (born 5 May 1999) is a German rhythmic gymnast. She competed in the group rhythmic gymnastics competition at the 2016 Summer Olympics, where the team was eliminated in the qualification round.
