= Luiza Ganieva =

Uzbekistani rhythmic gymnast (born 1995)

- Born: 11 November 1995 (age 31) Qashqadaryo Region, Uzbekistan

Gymnastics career
- Discipline: Rhythmic gymnastics
- Country represented: Uzbekistan
Medal record
Representing Uzbekistan
Asian Championships
Bronze medal – third place	2015 Jecheon	Group all-around
Bronze medal – third place	2013 Tashkent	Group all-around
Bronze medal – third place	2013 Tashkent	10 Clubs

Luiza Ganieva (born 11 November 1995) is an Uzbekistani former group rhythmic gymnast. She won three bronze medals at the Asian Championships and competed in the group rhythmic gymnastics competition at the 2016 Summer Olympics, where the group was eliminated in the qualification round. She is now a coach.

== Career ==
Ganieva began gymnast in 2002 at age 6.

At the 2010 Junior Asian Championships, she competed in the Uzbekistani group. They won bronze in the all-around along with the 4 hoops final. The next year, she debuted as a senior at the 2011 World Championships, where the group finished 18th.

Two years later, at the 2013 Asian Championships, the group won two bronze medals in the all-around and 10 clubs final. They placed 19th at the 2013 World Championships.

At the 2014 World Championships, they finished 16th. The next season, at the 2015 Asian Championships, the group won another bronze in the all-around. The group placed 10th in the all-around at the 2015 World Championships.

Ganieva and her teammates at the 2016 Gymnastics Olympic Test Event

The next year, they won silver at the 2016 Gymnastics Olympic Test Event, which secured them a place at the upcoming Olympics. Ahead of the 2016 Summer Olympics in Rio de Janeiro, Ganieva and the rest of the national team trained in Houston to acclimatize to the time zone and a similar climate. Ganieva was named the captain of the team. At the Olympics, they finished in 12th place in the qualifying round.

Ganieva briefly switched to aerobic gymnastics, and she competed at the 2017 Asian Championships as part of the first Uzbekistani delegation to the Asian Championships. There, she placed 10th in the women's individual qualification round.

== Post-competitive career ==
Ganieva began studying coaching at the Uzbek State Institute of Physical Culture in 2016. She now works as an assistant coach training the national team.
