= Gymnastics at the 2016 Summer Olympics – Women's rhythmic group all-around =

Women's rhythmic group all-around at the Games of the XXXI Olympiad
- Venue: HSBC Arena
- Date: 20 August 2016 (qualification); 21 August 2016 (final)
- Competitors: 70 from 14 nations
- Winning total: 36.233 points

Medalists
1st place, gold medalist(s)		Anastasia Bliznyuk; Anastasia Maksimova; Anastasiia Tatareva; Maria Tolkacheva; Vera Biryukova	Russia
2nd place, silver medalist(s)		Sandra Aguilar; Artemi Gavezou; Elena López; Lourdes Mohedano; Alejandra Quereda	Spain
3rd place, bronze medalist(s)		Reneta Kamberova; Lyubomira Kazanova; Mihaela Maevska-Velichkova; Tsvetelina Naydenova; Hristiana Todorova	Bulgaria

The women's rhythmic group all-around competition at the 2016 Summer Olympics was held at the Rio Olympic Arena.

The medals were presented by Alex Gilady, IOC member, Israel, and the flowers presented by Slava Corn, Vice President of the FIG, Canada.

== Competition format ==
The competition consisted of a qualification round and a final round. The top eight teams in the qualification round advance to the final round. In each round, the teams perform two routines (one with ribbons, one with clubs and hoops), with the scores added to give a total.

== Qualification ==
Rank	Team	5	3 + 2	Total	Qualification
1	Spain; Sandra Aguilar; Artemi Gavezou; Elena López; Lourdes Mohedano; Alejandra Quereda	17.783	17.966	35.749	Q
2	Russia; Vera Biryukova; Anastasia Bliznyuk; Anastasia Maksimova; Anastasiia Tatareva; Maria Tolkacheva	18.283	17.233	35.516	Q
3	Belarus; Hanna Dudzenkova; Maria Kadobina; Maryia Katsiak; Valeriya Pischelina; Arina Tsitsilina	17.583	17.850	35.433	Q
4	Italy; Martina Centofanti; Sofia Lodi; Alessia Maurelli; Marta Pagnini; Camilla Patriarca	17.516	17.833	35.349	Q
5	Japan; Airi Hatakeyama; Rie Matsubara; Sakura Noshitani; Sayuri Sugimoto; Kiko Yokota	17.416	17.733	35.149	Q
6	Israel; Yuval Filo; Alona Koshevatskiy; Ekaterina Levina; Karina Lykhvar; Ida Mayrin	17.250	17.633	34.883	Q
7	Bulgaria; Reneta Kamberova; Lyubomira Kazanova; Mihaela Maevska-Velichkova; Tsvetelina Naydenova; Hristiana Todorova	17.566	16.616	34.182	Q
8	Ukraine; Olena Dmytrash; Yevgeniya Gomon; Oleksandra Gridasova; Valeriia Gudym; Anastasiya Voznyak	16.950	16.866	33.816	Q
9	Brazil; Morgana Gmach; Emanuelle Lima; Jessica Maier; Gabrielle da Silva; Francielly Pereira	15.766	16.883	32.649	
10	Germany; Natalie Hermann; Anastasija Khmelnytska; Daniela Potapova; Julia Stavickaja; Sina Tkaltschewitsch	15.650	16.750	32.400	
11	China; Bao Yuqing; Shu Siyao; Yang Ye; Zhang Ling; Zhao Jingnan	16.333	15.800	32.133	
12	Uzbekistan; Samira Amirova; Valeriya Davidova; Luiza Ganieva; Zarina Kurbonova; Marta Rostoburova	14.416	16.750	31.166	
13	Greece; Ioanna Anagnostopoulou; Eleni Doika; Zoi Kontogianni; Michaela Metallidou; Stavroula Samara	15.000	15.416	30.416	
14	United States; Kiana Eide; Alisa Kano; Natalie McGiffert; Monica Rokhman; Kristen Shaldybin	13.908	16.316	30.224	

== Final ==
Rank	Team	5	3 + 2	Total
1st place, gold medalist(s)	Russia; Vera Biryukova; Anastasia Bliznyuk; Anastasia Maksimova; Anastasiia Tatareva; Maria Tolkacheva	17.600	18.633	36.233
2nd place, silver medalist(s)	Spain; Sandra Aguilar; Artemi Gavezou; Elena López; Lourdes Mohedano; Alejandra Quereda	17.800	17.966	35.766
3rd place, bronze medalist(s)	Bulgaria; Reneta Kamberova; Lyubomira Kazanova; Mihaela Maevska; Tsvetelina Naydenova; Hristiana Todorova	17.700	18.066	35.766
4	Italy; Martina Centofanti; Sofia Lodi; Alessia Maurelli; Marta Pagnini; Camilla Patriarca	17.516	18.033	35.549
5	Belarus; Hanna Dudzenkova; Maria Kadobina; Maryia Katsiak; Valeriya Pischelina; Arina Tsitsilina	17.283	18.016	35.299
6	Israel; Yuval Filo; Alona Koshevatskiy; Ekaterina Levina; Karina Lykhvar; Ida Mayrin	17.166	17.383	34.549
7	Ukraine; Olena Dmytrash; Yevgeniya Gomon; Oleksandra Gridasova; Valeriia Gudym; Anastasiya Voznyak	16.866	17.416	34.282
8	Japan; Airi Hatakeyama; Rie Matsubara; Sakura Noshitani; Sayuri Sugimoto; Kiko Yokota	16.550	17.650	34.200
