= Zhao Jingnan =

Chinese rhythmic gymnast

Personal information
- Native name: 赵敬楠
- Nationality: Chinese
- Born: 7 March 1995 (age 31) Liaoning, China
- Height: 168 cm (5 ft 6 in)
- Weight: 51 kg (112 lb)

Sport
- Sport: Rhythmic gymnastics
Medal record
Representing China
Asian Championships
Gold medal – first place	2013 Tashkent	team all-around

Zhao Jingnan (Chinese: 赵敬楠; born 7 March 1995) is a Chinese rhythmic gymnast. She competed in the group rhythmic gymnastics competition at the 2016 Summer Olympics, where the team was eliminated in the qualification round.

Zhao began her training in October 2002, becoming a member of the Liaoning provincial rhythmic gymnastics team in July 2008. She joined the Chinese national team in April 2011. As part of the Liaoning team, she won the National Rhythmic Gymnastics Championships in 2012 and in 2013, during the 12th National Games of the People's Republic of China, her team won the women's group all-around rhythmic gymnastics competition. The same year, the Competitive Sports Department of the General Administration of Sport of China awarded Zhao the International Master Athlete title.

At the 2016 Asian Rhythmic Gymnastics Championships, Zhao placed fifth in the women's group, after earning first place in the ribbon event, after which she qualified for the group rhythmic gymnastics team for the 2016 Summer Olympics. In 2017, Zhao participated in the 13th National Games of the People's Republic of China, where Liaoning won the rhythmic gymnastics category for the fourth consecutive year.

By 2022, Zhao was retired from competitive sports. The same year, she became a spokesperson for Baohang Watches.
