= Samira Amirova =

Uzbekistani rhythmic gymnast (born 1998)

Personal information
- Nationality: Uzbekistani
- Born: 2 April 1998 (age 27)

Sport
- Sport: Rhythmic gymnastics

Samira Amirova (born 2 April 1998) is an Uzbekistani rhythmic gymnast. She competed in the group rhythmic gymnastics competition at the 2016 Summer Olympics, where the team was eliminated in the qualification round.
