= Shu Siyao =

Chinese rhythmic gymnast

Personal information
- Nationality: Chinese
- Born: 12 September 1992 (age 33)
- Height: 5'7
- Spouse: Li Jie (m. 2021)

Sport
- Sport: Rhythmic gymnastics

Shu Siyao (born 12 September 1992) is a Chinese rhythmic gymnast. She won a gold medal at the 2014 World Cup in Debrecen, Hungary. She competed in the group rhythmic gymnastics competition at the 2016 Summer Olympics, where the team was eliminated in the qualification round. After the Rio Olympics in 2016, Shu Siyao chose to retire and became a rhythmic gymnast. She took up the sport at age six in the Sichuan province, China.

== Olympic Games ==
2016 - Games of the XXXI Olympiad Rio de Janeiro - Group All-Around.

== World Championships ==
2011 - 31st FIG Rhythmic Gymnastics World Championships MONTPELLIER (FRA)

2014 - 33rd FIG Rhythmic Gymnastics World Championships IZMIR (TUR)

2015 - 34th FIG Rhythmic Gymnastics World Championships STUTTGART (GER)

== World/Challenge Cup ==
2016 - World Cup 2016 Cat. B KAZAN (RUS)

== Continental Championships ==
2016 - 8th Asian Championships 2016 TASHKENT (UZB)

== Personal life ==
Shu Siyao married Li Jie on September 15, 2021, who she had been with for 13 years. She is currently a coach of the Sichuan rhythmic gymnastics team.
