= Marta Rostoburova =

Uzbekistani rhythmic gymnast (born 1996)

Personal information
- Nationality: Uzbekistani
- Born: 29 March 1996 (age 30)

Sport
- Sport: Rhythmic gymnastics
Medal record
Representing Uzbekistan
Asian Championships
Bronze medal – third place	2013 Tashkent	team all-around
Bronze medal – third place	2013 Tashkent	10 Clubs

Marta Rostoburova (born 29 March 1996) is an Uzbekistani rhythmic gymnast. She competed in the group rhythmic gymnastics competition at the 2016 Summer Olympics, where the team was eliminated in the qualification round.
