= Zarina Kurbonova =

Uzbekistani rhythmic gymnast (born 1995)

Personal information
- Nationality: Uzbekistani
- Born: 6 May 1995 (age 31)

Sport
- Sport: Rhythmic gymnastics
Medal record
Representing Uzbekistan
Asian Championships
Bronze medal – third place	2013 Tashkent	Team all-around
Bronze medal – third place	2013 Tashkent	10 Clubs

Zarina Kurbonova (born 6 May 1995) is an Uzbekistani rhythmic gymnast. She competed in the group rhythmic gymnastics competition at the 2016 Summer Olympics, where the team was eliminated in the qualification round.
