= Bao Yuqing =

Chinese rhythmic gymnast (born 1993)

Personal information
- Born: 23 September 1993 (age 32) Zhejiang, China

Sport
- Sport: Rhythmic gymnastics
Medal record
Representing China
Asian Championships
Gold medal – first place	2013 Tashkent	team all-around

Bao Yuqing (born 23 September 1993) is a Chinese rhythmic gymnast. She competed in the group rhythmic gymnastics competition at the 2016 Summer Olympics, where the team was eliminated in the qualification round.
