= Mihaela Maevska =

Bulgarian rhythmic gymnast (born 1990)

- Born: 4 October 1990 (age 35) Sofia, Bulgaria
- Height: 172 cm (5 ft 8 in)

Gymnastics career
- Discipline: Rhythmic gymnastics
- Country represented: Bulgaria (2007-2016)
- Club: Levski Iliana
- Head coach: Ina Ananieva
- Assistant coach: Daniela Velcheva
Medal record
International Gymnastics Competitions
Event	1st	2nd	3rd
Olympic Games	0	0	1
World Championships	2	2	4
European Championships	1	1	3
Grand Prix	2	5	5
World Cup	17	18	14
Total	22	26	27
Representing Bulgaria
Group Rhythmic Gymnastics
Olympic Games
Bronze medal – third place	2016 Rio de Janeiro	Group All-around
World Championships
Gold medal – first place	2011 Montpellier	3 Ribbons + 2 Hoop
Gold medal – first place	2014 Izmir	Group All-around
Silver medal – second place	2014 Izmir	3 Balls + 2 Ribbons
Silver medal – second place	2015 Stuttgart	Group All-around
Bronze medal – third place	2010 Moscow	5 Hoops
Bronze medal – third place	2011 Montpellier	Group All-around
Bronze medal – third place	2011 Montpellier	5 Balls
Bronze medal – third place	2015 Stuttgart	6 Clubs + 2 Hoops
European Championships
Gold medal – first place	2014 Baku	10 clubs
Silver medal – second place	2012 N.Novgorod	3 ribbons + 2 hoops
Bronze medal – third place	2012 N.Novgorod	5 balls
Bronze medal – third place	2014 Baku	3 balls + 2 ribbons
Bronze medal – third place	2016 Holon	6 Clubs + 2 Hoops

Mihaela Maevska (Bulgarian Cyrillic: Михаела Маевска, born 4 October 1990 in Sofia) is a Bulgarian group rhythmic gymnast. She was part of the Bulgarian group that won bronze in group all-around at the 2016 Summer Olympics. She is also the 2014 World group all-around champion, as well as the 2015 World group all-around silver and the 2011 World group all-around bronze medalist.

== Personal life ==
Her partner Georgi Georgiev is a Bulgarian track and field athlete. In June 2024, she gave birth to a girl, Atina.

== Career ==
Maevska has been practicing gymnastics since the age of 7, when she was a first grader.

She first appeared in Bulgarian national team as a member of senior group that competed at the 2009 European Championships, and took 7th place in group all-around.

Next year she competed at the 2010 European Championships, where the group was 6th in the all-around. At the 2010 World Championships, they came 5th in the all-around and won bronze medal in the 5 hoops final.

She was a member of the Bulgarian group that won the bronze all-around medal at the 2011 World Championships in Montpellier, France. In the event finals, they won a second bronze with 5 balls as well as gold in the mixed apparatus event. With their performance, they earned a quota to compete at the 2012 Summer Olympics.

In 2012, she underwent surgery on a right knee injury that kept her out of action for a month. At the 2012 European Championships, she competed in both routines. The group was 4th in the all-around, and in the event finals, they won silver with 3 ribbons + 2 hoops and bronze with 5 balls. Later that year, at the 2012 Summer Olympics, the Bulgarian group qualified for the final in 4th place, but they fell to 6th in the final.

Maevska continued to compete after the Olympics. The next year, she competed at the 2013 World Championships, where the group was 5th in the all-around as well as in 3 Balls + 2 Ribbons final.

In June 2014, she and her fellow gymnasts from the Bulgarian group won a gold medal in the 10 clubs event of the 2014 Rhythmic Gymnastics European Championships. In September 2014, Maevska and her teammates won gold in the group all-around at the 2014 World Championships, a milestone success, as this occurred 17 years after the Bulgarian group had last claimed gold - at the 1996 World Championships. The team also earned a silver medal in 3 Balls + 2 Ribbons at the 2014 event.

On 22 December 2014, Maevska and the other members of the national gymnastics squad were chosen as the team of the year in Bulgarian sport.

Maevska was member of the Bulgarian group that competed at the 2016 Summer Olympics in Rio de Janeiro, Brazil, together with Lyubomira Kazanova, Reneta Kamberova, Tsvetelina Naydenova, Hristiana Todorova. They won the Group All-around bronze medal. They dedicated their medal to their teammate Tsvetelina Stoyanova, who attempted to commit suicide and fell from her apartment in Sofia. Maevska was the flag bearer for Bulgaria during the closing ceremony.

In 2017, she became assistant coach to the Senior Bulgarian Group along with the head coach Vesela Dimitrova. The group competed at the 2020 Summer Olympics and won the gold medal in the Group All-around for the first time in the history of the Bulgarian rhythmic gymnastics.

After the win the girls from group (Simona Dyankova, Laura Traets, Madlen Radukanova, Erika Zafirova, and Stefani Kiryakova) ended their sports careers. Maevska continued with its assistant coach role with the next Bulgarian group. On the 1st of November 2023, she resigned from her position due to personal matters.

== Detailed Olympic results ==
Year	Competition Description	Location	Music	Apparatus	Rank	Score-Final	Rank	Score-Qualifying
2016	Olympics	Rio de Janeiro		All-around	3rd	35.766	7th	34.182
2016	Olympics	Rio de Janeiro	Chateau, Mona Lisa Overdrive, Burly Brawl (Matrix) by Rob Dougan	6 Clubs / 2 Hoops	3rd	18.066	5th	16.616
2016	Olympics	Rio de Janeiro	Yuvigi Han by Georgi Andreev	5 Ribbons	2nd	17.700	5th	17.566
