= Natalie Hermann =

German rhythmic gymnast

- Born: 27 August 1999 (age 27)
- Height: 170 cm (5 ft 7 in)

Gymnastics career
- Discipline: Rhythmic gymnastics
- Country represented: Germany

Natalie Hermann (born 27 August 1999) is a German group rhythmic gymnast. She competed at the 2016 Summer Olympics in Rio de Janeiro as part of the German rhythmic gymnastics team. The German team finished 10th in qualifications and did not advance to the final.
