= Tsvetelina Naydenova =

Bulgarian rhythmic gymnast (born 1994)

- Full name: Tsvetelina Biserova Naydenova
- Nickname: Cuci
- Born: 28 April 1994 (age 32) Sofia, Bulgaria
- Height: 168 cm (5 ft 6 in)

Gymnastics career
- Discipline: Rhythmic gymnastics
- Country represented: Bulgaria; (2007 - 2016)
- Club: Slavia
- Head coach: Ina Ananieva
Medal record
Representing Bulgaria
Group Rhythmic Gymnastics
Olympic Games
Bronze medal – third place	2016 Rio de Janeiro	Group all-around
World Championships
Gold medal – first place	2011 Montpellier	3 Ribbons + 2 Hoop
Gold medal – first place	2014 Izmir	Group All-around
Silver medal – second place	2014 Izmir	3 Balls + 2 Ribbons
Silver medal – second place	2015 Stuttgart	Group All-around
Bronze medal – third place	2010 Moscow	5 Hoops
Bronze medal – third place	2011 Montpellier	Group All-around
Bronze medal – third place	2011 Montpellier	5 Balls
Bronze medal – third place	2015 Stuttgart	6 Clubs + 2 Hoops
European Championships
Gold medal – first place	2014 Baku	10 clubs
Silver medal – second place	2012 N.Novgorod	3 ribbons + 2 hoops
Bronze medal – third place	2012 N.Novgorod	5 balls
Bronze medal – third place	2014 Baku	3 balls + 2 ribbons
Bronze medal – third place	2016 Holon	6 Clubs + 2 Hoops

Tsvetelina Naydenova (Bulgarian: Цветелина Найденова; born 28 April 1994) is a Bulgarian former group rhythmic gymnast. She competed at two Olympic games in 2012 and 2016 and is a 2014 World champion in the group event.

== Career ==
Naydenova began rhythmic gymnastics when she was 4 at the Slavia club.

In 2011, Naydenova was a member of the group competing at the 2011 World Championships, where they won bronze in the all-around, as well as a gold (mixed apparatus) and a second bronze (5 balls) in the event finals. With their performance, they earned a quota to compete at the 2012 Summer Olympics.

At the 2012 European Championships, they were 4th in the group all-around, and in the event finals, they won silver with 3 ribbons + 2 hoops and bronze with 5 balls. Later that year, at the 2012 Summer Olympics, the Bulgarian group qualified for the final in 4th place, but they fell to 6th in the final.

Naydenova continued her competitive career after the Olympics. In 2014, she and her teammates became the all-around World champions; at the same competition, they won an additional silver medal in the 3 balls + 2 ribbons final. The next year, at the 2015 World Championships, they were the silver all-around medalists. In the 3 pairs of clubs + 2 hoops final, they also won bronze.

The next year, Naydenova was a member of the Bulgarian group that competed at the 2016 Summer Olympics in Rio de Janeiro, Brazil. Her teammates were Lyubomira Kazanova, Mihaela Maevska, Reneta Kamberova, and Hristiana Todorova. In the final, they won the group all-around bronze medal. They dedicated their medal to their teammate Tsvetelina Stoyanova, who attempted suicide and fell from her apartment in Sofia.

After the Olympics, Naydenova retired from competing and began working on a degree at the National Sports Academy "Vasil Levski". In 2017, she was selected to be the assistant coach of the national junior group, with Vyara Vatashka acting as the head coach.

== Detailed Olympic results ==
Year	Competition Description	Location	Music	Apparatus	Rank	Score-Final	Rank	Score-Qualifying
2016	Olympics	Rio de Janeiro		All-around	3rd	35.766	7th	34.182
2016	Olympics	Rio de Janeiro	Chateau, Mona Lisa Overdrive, Burly Brawl (Matrix) by Rob Dougan	6 Clubs / 2 Hoops	3rd	18.066	5th	16.616
2016	Olympics	Rio de Janeiro	Yuvigi Han by Georgi Andreev	5 Ribbons	2nd	17.700	5th	17.566
