= Anastasija Khmelnytska =

German rhythmic gymnast (born 1997)

Personal information
- Born: 31 December 1997 (age 28) Prague, Czech Republic
- Height: 171 cm (5 ft 7 in)
- Weight: 56 kg (123 lb)

Sport
- Country: Germany
- Sport: Rhythmic gymnastics

Anastasija Khmelnytska (born 31 December 1997) is a German rhythmic gymnast. She competed in the group rhythmic gymnastics competition at the 2016 Summer Olympics, where the team was eliminated in the qualification round.
