= Reneta Kamberova =

Bulgarian rhythmic gymnast (born 1990)

- Nickname: Rennie
- Born: September 12, 1990 (age 35) Pazardzhik, Bulgaria
- Height: 170 cm (5 ft 7 in)

Gymnastics career
- Discipline: Rhythmic gymnastics
- Country represented: Bulgaria
- Club: Iliana
- Head coach: Ina Ananieva
- Assistant coach: Daniela Veltcheva
- Choreographer: Peter Koldamov
Medal record
International Gymnastics Competitions
Event	1st	2nd	3rd
Olympic Games	0	0	1
World Championships	3	2	4
European Championships	1	1	3
Grand Prix	2	5	5
World Cup	17	18	14
Total	22	26	27
Representing Bulgaria
Group Rhythmic Gymnastics
Olympic Games
Bronze medal – third place	2016 Rio de Janeiro	Group All-around
World Championships
Gold medal – first place	2011 Montpellier	3 Ribbons + 2 Hoop
Gold medal – first place	2014 Izmir	Group All-around
Silver medal – second place	2014 Izmir	3 Balls + 2 Ribbons
Silver medal – second place	2015 Stuttgart	Group All-around
Bronze medal – third place	2010 Moscow	5 Hoops
Bronze medal – third place	2011 Montpellier	Group All-around
Bronze medal – third place	2011 Montpellier	5 Balls
Bronze medal – third place	2015 Stuttgart	6 Clubs + 2 Hoops
European Championships
Gold medal – first place	2014 Baku	10 clubs
Silver medal – second place	2012 N.Novgorod	3 ribbons + 2 hoops
Bronze medal – third place	2012 N.Novgorod	5 balls
Bronze medal – third place	2014 Baku	3 balls + 2 ribbons
Bronze medal – third place	2016 Holon	6 Clubs + 2 Hoops

Reneta Petrova Kamberova (Bulgarian: Ренета Петрова Камберова; born 12 September 1990 in Pazardzhik) is a Bulgarian Group rhythmic gymnast. She was part of the Bulgarian group that won bronze in group all-around at the 2016 Summer Olympics. She is also the 2014 World group all-around champion, as well as the 2015 World group all-around silver and the 2011 World group all-around bronze medalist.

== Career ==
Reneta is a veteran of the Bulgarian Group. Competing at four World Championships, Kamberova has been practising gymnastics since the age of 7.

She first appeared in Bulgarian national team as a member of senior group that competed at the 2009 European Championships, and took 7th place in group all-around.

Next year she competed at the 2010 European Championships, where the group was 6th in the all-around. At the 2010 World Championships, they came 5th in the all-around and won bronze medal in the 5 hoops final.

The Bulgarian group won bronze in all-around at the 2011 World Championships in Montpellier, France. In the event finals, they won a second bronze with 5 balls as well as gold in the mixed apparatus event.

At the 2012 European Championships, they were 4th in the group all-around, and in the event finals, they won silver with 3 ribbons + 2 hoops and bronze with 5 balls. Later that year, at the 2012 Summer Olympics, the Bulgarian group qualified for the final in 4th place, but they fell to 6th in the final.

In June 2014, she and the Bulgarian group won a gold medal in the 10 clubs event of the 2014 Rhythmic Gymnastics European Championships. They won gold medal at the 2014 World Cup Final in Kazan, Russia in 3 Balls + 2 Ribbons and silver in 10 Clubs. In September 22–28, Kamberova and her group mates won gold in the group all-around at the 2014 World Championships, 17 years later since the Bulgarian group won gold at the 1996 World Championships, they also won silver medal in 3 Balls + 2 Ribbons.

On 22 December 2014, Kamberova and her colleagues from the national gymnastics team were chosen as the team of the year in Bulgarian sport.

Kamberova was a member of the Bulgarian group that competed at the 2016 Summer Olympics in Rio de Janeiro, Brazil. Together with Lyubomira Kazanova, Mihaela Maevska, Tsvetelina Naydenova, Hristiana Todorova, they won the Group All-around bronze medal. They dedicated their medal to their teammate Tsvetelina Stoyanova, who had attempted to commit suicide and fell from her apartment in Sofia.

== Detailed Olympic results ==
Year	Competition Description	Location	Music	Apparatus	Rank	Score-Final	Rank	Score-Qualifying
2016	Olympics	Rio de Janeiro		All-around	3rd	35.766	7th	34.182
2016	Olympics	Rio de Janeiro	Chateau, Mona Lisa Overdrive, Burly Brawl (Matrix) by Rob Dougan	6 Clubs / 2 Hoops	3rd	18.066	5th	16.616
2016	Olympics	Rio de Janeiro	Yuvigi Han by Georgi Andreev	5 Ribbons	2nd	17.700	5th	17.566
