= Daniela Potapova =

German rhythmic gymnast

- Born: 17 January 1996 (age 30)
- Height: 166 cm (5 ft 5 in)

Gymnastics career
- Discipline: Rhythmic gymnastics
- Country represented: Germany

Daniela Potapova (born 17 January 1996) is a German rhythmic gymnast. She competed in the group rhythmic gymnastics competition at the 2016 Summer Olympics, where the team was eliminated in the qualification round.
