= Lyubomira Kazanova =

Bulgarian group rhythmic gymnast (born 1996)

- Full name: Lyubomira Milkova Kazanova Aleksandrova
- Nickname: Luba
- Born: 23 May 1996 (age 30) Sofia, Bulgaria
- Height: 1.77 m (5 ft 10 in)

Gymnastics career
- Discipline: Rhythmic gymnastics
- Country represented: Bulgaria
- Club: Levski Sofia
- Head coach: Ina Ananieva
- Assistant coach: Stela Hristova
Medal record
Representing Bulgaria
Group Rhythmic Gymnastics
Olympic Games
Bronze medal – third place	2016 Rio de Janeiro	Group All-around
European Championships
Bronze medal – third place	2016 Holon	6 Clubs / 2 Hoops

Lyubomira Milkova Kazanova (Bulgarian: Любомира Милкова Казанова; born 23 May 1996) is a Bulgarian former group rhythmic gymnast. She won bronze medals with the Bulgarian group at the 2016 Summer Olympics and the 2016 European Championships.

== Personal life ==
Her father, Milko Kazanov, competed in canoe sprint for Bulgaria and is a four-time Olympian (1992-2004). He won a bronze medal in the K2 1000m at the 1996 Olympic Games in Atlanta. She married Bulgarian rower Aleksandar Aleksandrov in September 2018. Together they have two daughters, Sofia and Daria.

== Career ==
She began rhythmic gymnastics when she was four years old.

Kazanova had been the reserve for the Bulgarian group for three years, but she was added to the group in 2016 after Tsvetelina Stoyanova's suicide attempt. Her first competition was the 2016 European Championships in Holon, Israel. There, the group finished fifth in the group all-around and fourth in 5 ribbons. Then in the 6 clubs and 2 hoops, they won the bronze medal behind Israel and Spain. She competed at the 2016 Kazan World Challenge Cup and helped Bulgaria win the gold medal in 5 ribbons ahead of Russia and Israel.

Kazanova competed at the 2016 Summer Olympics in Rio de Janeiro, Brazil, alongside Reneta Kamberova, Mihaela Maevska, Tsvetelina Naydenova, Hristiana Todorova. They only qualified for the group all-around final in seventh place, but they went on to win the bronze medal. This marked the third time Bulgaria won an Olympic medal in the event, after bronze in 2004 and silver in 1996. They dedicated their medal to their teammate Stoyanova. Kazanova announced her retirement at the end of 2016 and shared she had been competing throughout the year with a fractured ankle.

After retiring from the sport, Kazanova started working as a coach in Levski Iliana club.

== Detailed Olympic results ==
Year	Competition Description	Location	Music	Apparatus	Rank	Score-Final	Rank	Score-Qualifying
2016	Olympics	Rio de Janeiro		All-around	3rd	35.766	7th	34.182
2016	Olympics	Rio de Janeiro	Chateau, Mona Lisa Overdrive, Burly Brawl (Matrix) by Rob Dougan	6 Clubs / 2 Hoops	3rd	18.066	5th	16.616
2016	Olympics	Rio de Janeiro	Yuvigi Han by Georgi Andreev	5 Ribbons	2nd	17.700	5th	17.566
