= Hristiana Todorova =

Bulgarian rhythmic gymnast (born 1994)

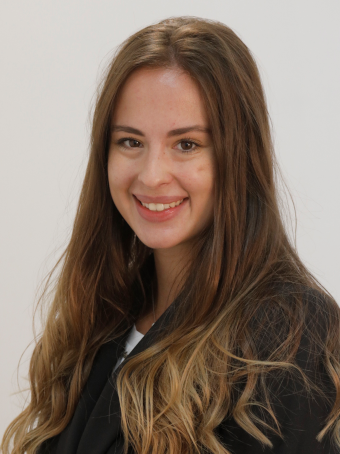
- Nickname: Hrisi
- Born: 28 November 1994 (age 31) Sofia, Bulgaria
- Height: 175 cm (5 ft 9 in)

Gymnastics career
- Discipline: Rhythmic gymnastics
- Country represented: Bulgaria (2007-2016)
- Club: Levski Iliana
- Head coach: Ina Ananieva
- Assistant coach: Daniela Velcheva
Medal record
Group Rhythmic Gymnastics
Representing Bulgaria
Olympic Games
Bronze medal – third place	2016 Rio de Janeiro	Group all-around
World Championships
Gold medal – first place	2011 Montpellier	3 Ribbons + 2 Hoop
Gold medal – first place	2014 Izmir	Group All-around
Silver medal – second place	2014 Izmir	3 Balls + 2 Ribbons
Silver medal – second place	2015 Stuttgart	Group All-around
Bronze medal – third place	2010 Moscow	5 Hoops
Bronze medal – third place	2011 Montpellier	Group All-around
Bronze medal – third place	2011 Montpellier	5 Balls
Bronze medal – third place	2015 Stuttgart	6 Clubs + 2 Hoops
European Championships
Gold medal – first place	2014 Baku	10 clubs
Silver medal – second place	2012 N.Novgorod	3 ribbons + 2 hoops
Bronze medal – third place	2012 N.Novgorod	5 balls
Bronze medal – third place	2014 Baku	3 balls + 2 ribbons
Bronze medal – third place	2016 Holon	6 Clubs + 2 Hoops

Hristiana Todorova (Bulgarian: Християна Тодорова; born 28 November 1994) is a Bulgarian politician and former group rhythmic gymnast. She competed at the 2012 Summer Olympics as well as the 2016 Summer Olympics, where she won a bronze medal in the group all-around.

== Personal life ==
Todorova has two younger sisters. As a gymnast, she admired Ukrainian gymnast Anna Bessonova.

In March 2025, she gave birth to a girl, Elia.

== Gymnastics career ==
Todorova began gymnastics when she was 4.

She competed as a member of the Bulgarian junior group at the 2009 European Championships, where juniors only competed one routine. They placed 6th in the final.

The next year, she was a member of the senior Bulgarian group at the 2010 European Championships. She competed in the 5 hoops routine. The group was 6th in the all-around. At the 2010 World Championships, they came 5th in the all-around and won bronze in the 5 hoops final.

Todorova was a member of the Bulgarian group that won the bronze all-around medal at the 2011 World Championships. In the event finals, they won a second bronze with 5 balls as well as gold in the mixed apparatus event.

At the 2012 European Championships, she competed in both routines. The group was 4th in the all-around, and in the event finals, they won silver with 3 ribbons + 2 hoops and bronze with 5 balls. Later that year, at the 2012 Summer Olympics, the Bulgarian group qualified for the final in 4th place, but they fell to 6th in the final.

Todorova continued to compete after the Olympics. The next year, she competed at the 2013 World Championships, where the group was 5th in the all-around.

At the 2014 European Championships, Todorova competed with the group, which won medals in both event finals: gold with 5 pairs of clubs and bronze with 3 balls + 2 ribbons. Later that year, she and her teammates became World champions in the all-around. They won a second medal, silver, in the mixed apparatus final.

The next season, she competed at the 2015 World Championships, where the group were the all-around silver medalists. They won bronze in the mixed apparatus final.

Todorova's last season was 2016. The group finished 5th in the all-around at the 2016 European Championships, but they won bronze in the mixed-apparatus event final. That August, Todorova was member of the Bulgarian group that competed at the 2016 Summer Olympics in Rio de Janeiro, Brazil. Her teammates there were Lyubomira Kazanova, Mihaela Maevska, Tsvetelina Naydenova, and Reneta Kamberova. They won the group all-around bronze medal, which they dedicated to their teammate Tsvetelina Stoyanova, who had attempted suicide and fell from her apartment in Sofia.

== Post-competitive career ==
She completed her career after the Olympic Games. After ending her competitive career, she became a judge and began judging international competitions in 2022. In 2023, she became a member of the European Gymnastics rhythmic gymnastics Technical Committee, and she is also vice president of the Bulgarian Rhythmic Gymnastics Federation's Judges Committee.

Todorova was a witness in a Court of Arbitration for Sport (CAS) case involving an event where she had judged, the 2024 European Championships, where it was alleged that the president of the superior jury, Evangelia Trikomiti, had manipulated scores to decide which gymnast won the 2024 Summer Olympics quota available at the competition. Todorova was criticized in the CAS decision for giving misleading answers to questions that denied that she was engaged to Trikomiti's son, the father of her child, as well as for being an uncooperative witness.

== Detailed Olympic results ==
Year	Competition Description	Location	Music	Apparatus	Rank	Score-Final	Rank	Score-Qualifying
2016	Olympics	Rio de Janeiro		All-around	3rd	35.766	7th	34.182
2016	Olympics	Rio de Janeiro	Chateau, Mona Lisa Overdrive, Burly Brawl (Matrix) by Rob Dougan	6 Clubs / 2 Hoops	3rd	18.066	5th	16.616
2016	Olympics	Rio de Janeiro	Yuvigi Han by Georgi Andreev	5 Ribbons	2nd	17.700	5th	17.566

== Political career ==
Todorova briefly became a member in the National Parliament for the ITN party in 2021.
