= Tsvetelina Stoyanova =

Bulgarian rhythmic gymnast (born 1994)

- Full name: Tsvetelina Yordanova Stoyanova
- Nickname: Tsveti
- Born: 13 September 1994 (age 31) Sofia, Bulgaria
- Height: 172 cm/5 ft 6 in

Gymnastics career
- Discipline: Rhythmic gymnastics
- Country represented: Bulgaria; (2006 - 2016)
- Club: Levski Iliana
- Head coach: Ina Ananieva
- Assistant coach: Daniela Velcheva
Medal record
International Gymnastics Competitions
Event	1st	2nd	3rd
World Championships	1	2	1
European Championships	1	0	1
Grand Prix	2	5	5
World Cup	11	16	6
Total	15	23	13
Representing Bulgaria
Group Rhythmic Gymnastics
World Championships
Gold medal – first place	2014 Izmir	Group All-around
Silver medal – second place	2014 Izmir	3 Balls + 2 Ribbons
Silver medal – second place	2015 Stuttgart	Group All-around
Bronze medal – third place	2015 Stuttgart	6 Clubs + 2 Hoops
European Championships
Gold medal – first place	2014 Baku	10 Clubs
Bronze medal – third place	2014 Baku	3 Balls + 2 Ribbons
Junior European Championships
Bronze medal – third place	2008 Torino	Rope

Tsvetelina Yordanova Stoyanova (Bulgarian: Цветелина Йорданова Стоянова; born 13 September 1994 in Sofia, Bulgaria) is a Bulgarian group rhythmic gymnast. She is the 2008 European Junior bronze medalist in rope. She won the gold medal in the Group-all around the 2014 World Championships.

== Career ==
Stoyanova is member of the Bulgarian National team since 2006 and competed in international competitions since 2008. Stoyanova is a veteran and competed in numerous world championships, including at the 2014 World Championships where she was member of the Bulgarian Group that won gold in the group all-around and silver in 3 Balls/2 Ribbons. She competed at the 2015 European Games in Baku. At the 2015 World Championships, the Bulgarian group won a silver in group all-around and bronze medal in 6 Clubs/2 Hoops.

== Accident ==
In June 2016, Stoyanova survived a high fall - she fell from the sixth floor of her apartment in Sofia just a few days after withdrawing from training due to health problems. She was severely injured and underwent multiple surgeries, including having her spleen removed. She was taken out of intensive care in August 2016 and will continue rehabilitation. Her rhythmic gymnastics teammates dedicated their bronze medal in the group all-around competition at the Rio 2016 Olympics to Stoyanova. Stoyanova left the hospital in September, and had her first public appearance in five months by attending the rhythmic gymnastics' team farewell show at Arena Armeec in November.
