= Valeria Schiavi =

Italian rhythmic gymnast

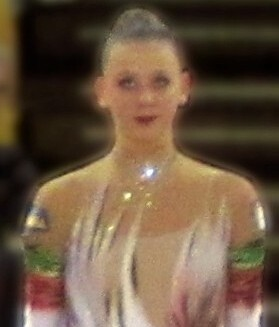

Personal information
- Born: 10 October 1995 (age 30) San Benedetto del Tronto, Italy

Gymnastics career
- Discipline: Rhythmic gymnastics
- Country represented: Italy; (2012-2014)
- Club: Aurora Fano
- Head coach: Emmanuela Maccarani
- Former coach: Nani Londarize
- Retired: yes
Medal record
Event	1st	2nd	3rd
World Championships	0	3	0
European Championships	0	1	0
FIG World Cup	7	2	2
Total	7	6	2
World Championships
Silver medal – second place	2013 Kiev	Group All-around
Silver medal – second place	2013 Kiev	10 Clubs
European Championships
Silver medal – second place	2014 Baku	Group All-around

Valeria Schiavi (born 10 October 1995) is a retired Italian rhythmic gymnast. She represented her country in international competitions.

== Career ==
Valeria started training in rhythmic gymnastics at the Sport Life Club. In December 2006 she won silver with Aurora Fano in the junior group championships in Pesaro. In October 2007 she topped the All-Around at the Italian Category Championship. The following year she in the Serie A with her club Aurora Fano.

In 2010 she made her debut at the Trinacria Tournament in Sicily. In March she won gold in teams in a bilateral tournament with the Swiss national team. She then took 15th place overall among juniors at the Deriugina Cup. In early June she participated in the Italian Championships. Followed by 4th place in an international tournament in Prato. Selected for the World Cup in Pesaro she was 4th among the junior teams along Giulia Gualco and Alessia Russo. In November she won silver in the Serie A with her club along Ilaria Landini, Martina Alicata, Lucia Palazzi and Camilla Bini.

The following year she took part, for the first time as a senior, in the World Cup in Pesaro even if out of competition. In April she won silver behind Veronica Bertolini in the Category Championships. In Kalamata she was 25th in the All-Around. In July she competed again at nationals. Weeks later she was in Cagliari for a competition with Russia and France. In November she won another silver competing with Aurora Fano.

In 2012 she took 18th place in the Thiais International Tournament. Out of competition she performed in the World Cup in Pesaro. In May she was 27th in the stage in Corbeil-Essonnes. At nationals she was 4th in the All-Around. In December she was incorporated into the national senior group.

With the retirement of some gymnasts after the London Olympics, in 2013 Valeria became a starter in the group. In March the Italian group won the bilateral competition with Switzerland. In April Valeria and her teammates won all three golds at the World Cup in Pesaro. In Minsk they won bronze in the All-Around and gold with 10 clubs. During the summer the national group performed galas around Italy. In August she won bronze with 10 clubs at the World Cup in Saint Petersburg. Camilla was then selected for her maiden World Championship in Kyiv. There, along Chiara Ianni, Marta Pagnini, Camilla Patriarca, Camilla Bini and Andreea Stefanescu, won silver in the All-Around and with 10 clubs. In November the group took part in the Italian Gymnastics Grand Prix and was awarded at the Gymnastics Oscars.

In March 2014 Valeria and her teammates won two silvers in the event finals at the World Cup in Stuttgart. A month later they won all three golds at the stage in Pesaro. In May she competed in the 2nd edition of the Desio Tournament. In Tashkent the group took 4th place in both event finals. At the European Championships in Baku, Italy won silver in the All-Around and were 5th with 5 pairs of clubs and 6th with 3 balls & 2 ribbons. After the group returned to Desio they performed in the Golden Butterfly Gala. An injury prevented her from competing in the World Championships in Izmir. After the injury protracted into 2015 she made the decision to retire.
