= Maria Carmen Crescenzi =

Italian rhythmic gymnast

- Alternative name: Carmen Crescenzi
- Born: 27 September 1998 (age 28) Penne, Abruzzo, Italy

Gymnastics career
- Discipline: Rhythmic gymnastics
- Country represented: Italy; (2011-2016)
- Club: Armonia d'Abruzzo
- Head coach: Germana Germani
- Retired: yes
Medal record
Event	1st	2nd	3rd
FIG World Cup	0	1	1

Maria Carmen Crescenzi (born 27 September 1998) is a retired Italian rhythmic gymnast. She represented Italy in international competitions.

== Career ==
Crescenzi took up rhythmic gymnastics in 2003, and at the age of 8, and started training at a competitive level with the club Armonia d'Abruzzo, under the coaching of Germana Germani.

Since 2009, she has been part of the Armonia d'Abruzzo team, which competes in the top-tier Serie A championship, winning the title for six consecutive years (from 2009 to 2013).

=== Junior ===
In 2011 she was part of the Italian junior national group, together with Chiara di Battista, Alessia Russo, Alessia Medoro, Francesca Medoro and Valentina Savastio. They competed at the World Cups in Pesaro and Portimäo, being 4th and 6th. In May they competed at the European Championships in Minsk, being 6th in the All-Around and 7th in the final.

She returned to the individual modality in 2012, debuting at the Grand Prix in Moscow where she won bronze with hoop. In March she took 11th place in teams (along Sofia Lodi and Greta Merlo). At the World Cup in Pesaro she won silver with cubs and bronze with hoop. She was then selected for the European Championships in Nizhny Novgorod, taking 7th place with hoops and 5th with clubs. In October she took part in the AEON Cup alongside Alessia Russo and Chiara Di Battista, finishing 6th in teams and 5th among juniors.

At the 2013 Moscow Grand Prix she was 5th among juniors. In June she became tha national champion with hoop, clubs and ribbon competng with senior gymnasts.

=== Senior ===
Crescenzi became age-eligible for senior competitions in 2014. She made her international debut at the World Cup in Tashkent, being 16th in the All-Around, 13th with hoop, 16th with ball, 18th with clubs and 14th with hoop. In September she took part in the Kazan International Tournament, being 4th overall. Later she was the flagbearer for the Italian team at the World Championships in Izmir. In November she won silver in Serie A along Alice Aiello, Tanya Pysmenna, Marina Durunda and Alessia Russo.

In March 2015 she took part in the Thiais Grand Prix, being 14th in the All-Around. At the Bucharest World Cup she was 23rd overall, 19th with hoop, 30th with ball, 23rd with clubs and 24th with ribbon. In May she competed in the stage in Tashkent, being 14th in the All-Around, 17th with hoop, 16th with ball, 12th with clubs and 13th with ribbon. The following month she took 4th place at the Italian Championships, winning two silver medals in the event finals. At the “MTK Cup” that was held alongside the World Cup in Budapest, she was 10th overall. She was then selected to compete with clubs at her first World Championships in Stuttgart, she was 45th with the apparatus and 14th in teams with Veronica Bertolini, Alessia Russo and Letizia Cicconcelli. In Serie A she won gold with Armonia d'Abruzzo, tying with San Giorgio Desio.

Making her seasonal debut at the 2016 Grand Prix in Moscow she took 26th place. In late May she competed in the World Cup in Minsk, being 20th in the All-Around, 14th with hoop, 19th with ball, 27th with clubs and 18th with ribbon. In June she was 5th at nationals.

In September 2017, after retiring from the sport due to a knee injury, she won the "Miss Grand Prix" beauty pageant.
