= 2015 Rhythmic Gymnastics World Championships =

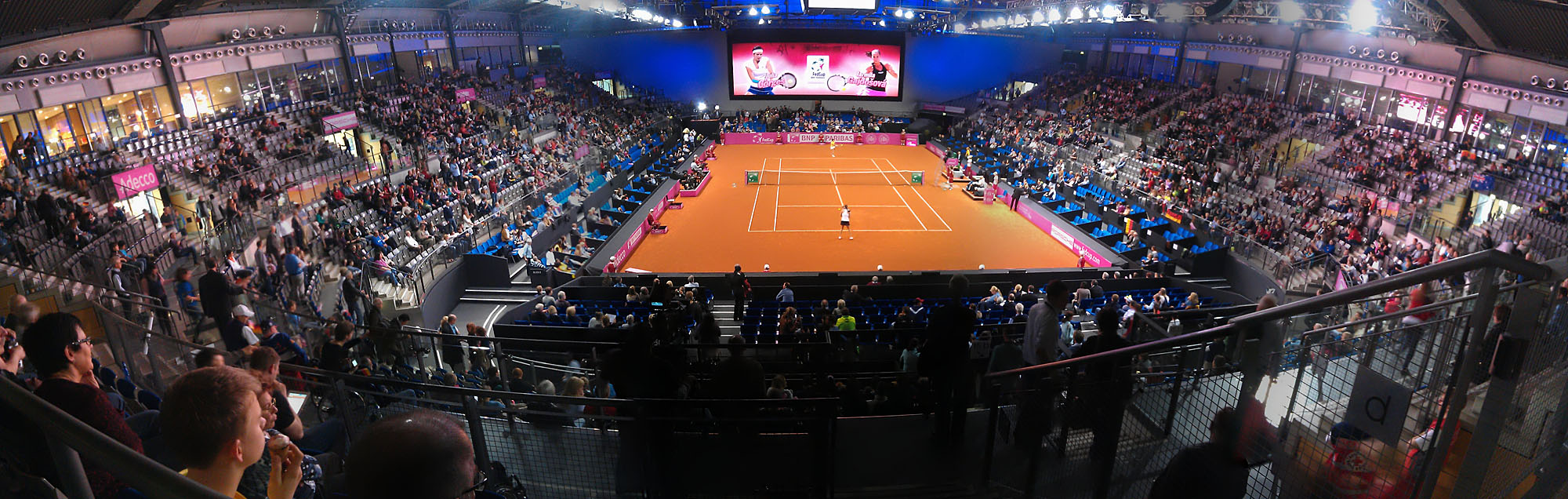
- The Porsche Arena, where the competition took place
- Venue: Porsche-Arena
- Location: Stuttgart, Germany
- Start date: 7 September 2015
- End date: 13 September 2015

The 2015 Rhythmic Gymnastics World Championships, the 34th edition, was held in Stuttgart, Germany, from September 7 to 13, 2015 at the Porsche Arena. It acted as a qualifying competition for the 2016 Summer Olympics.

During a review of the competition's scoring, the International Gymnastics Federation began an investigation into the results of five judges for biased scoring. One judge received a warning and another was suspended for three months, which was upheld on appeal.

== Participating countries ==
List of delegations participating in Championship.

- Angola
- Argentina
- Armenia
- Australia
- Austria
- Azerbaijan
- Belgium
- Bosnia and Herzegovina
- Belarus
- Brazil
- Bulgaria
- Canada
- Chile
- China
- Colombia
- Cape Verde
- Croatia
- Cyprus
- Czech Republic
- Denmark
- Ecuador
- Egypt
- Spain
- Estonia
- Finland
- France
- Great Britain
- Georgia
- Germany
- Greece
- Hungary
- Israel
- Italy
- Japan
- Kazakhstan
- Kyrgyzstan
- South Korea
- Latvia
- Lithuania
- Morocco
- Malaysia
- Mexico
- Norway
- Poland
- Portugal
- Romania
- Russia
- Singapore
- Slovenia
- South Africa
- San Marino
- Serbia
- Slovakia
- Sweden
- Turkey
- Ukraine
- United States
- Uzbekistan
- Venezuela

== Schedule ==
Sep 7 Monday

- 10:00-11:15 CI Individual group A – Hoop and Ball alternatively
- 11:15-12:25 CI Individual group B – Hoop and Ball alternatively
- 14:00-15:05 CI Individual group C – Hoop and Ball alternatively
- 15:05-16:15 CI Individual group D – Hoop and Ball alternatively

Sep 8 Tuesday

- 10:00-11:15 CI Individual group C – Hoop and Ball alternatively
- 11:05-12:15 CI Individual group D – Hoop and Ball alternatively
- 14:00-15:15 CI Individual, group A – Hoop and Ball alternatively
- 15:15-16:25 CI Individual, group B – Hoop and Ball alternatively
- 19:30-20:00 Opening Ceremony

Finals

- 20:00-20:30 CIII Individual Hoop
- 20:35-21:00 CIII Individual Ball

Award Ceremony Individual Final Hoop
Award Ceremony Individual Final Ball

Sep 9 Wednesday

- 10:00-11:35 CI Individual group D – Clubs and Ribbon alternatively
- 11:55-13:20 CI Individual group C – Clubs and Ribbon alternatively
- 15:00-16:35 CI Individual group B – Clubs and Ribbon alternatively
- 16:55-18:30 CI Individual group A – Clubs and Ribbon alternatively

Sep 10 Thursday

- 10:00-11:35 CI Individual group B – Clubs and Ribbon alternatively
- 11:55-13:30 CI Individual group A – Clubs and Ribbon alternatively
- 15:00-16:35 CI Individual group D – Clubs and Ribbon alternatively
- 16:55-18:20 CI Individual group C – Clubs and Ribbon alternatively

Finals

- 20:00-20:30 CIII Individual Clubs
- 20:35-21:00 CIII Individual Ribbon

Award Ceremony Individual Final Clubs
Award Ceremony Individual Final Ribbon
Award Ceremony Teams

Sep 11 Friday

Finals

- 16:00-18:30 CII Individuals (gymnasts ranked 13-24)
- 19:30-22:00 CII Individuals (gymnasts ranked 1-12)

Longines Prize of Elegance
Award ceremony Individual All-Around Final

Sep 12 Saturday

Finals

- 12:26-14:26 CI Groups – 5 Ribbons and 6 Clubs + 2 Hoops alternatively
- 14:38-16:38 CI Groups – 5 Ribbons and 6 Clubs + 2 Hoops alternatively

Award Ceremony General Competition Groups

Sep 13 Sunday

Finals

- 13:02-13:42 CIII Groups – 5 Ribbons
- 12:42-14:22 CIII Groups – 6 Clubs + 2 Hoops

Award Ceremony Group Final 5 Ribbons
Award Ceremony Group Final 6 Clubs + 2 Hoops

== Olympic qualification ==
There were 15 individual quotas and 10 group quotas available at this competition for the 2016 Rio Olympic Games. All places were non-nominative. The individual quotas were earned by each of the top 15 gymnasts in the all-around final. The top 8 groups in the all-around final also earned Olympic quotas for their country. The last two group spots were also based on the all-around results, but a minimum of three continents were required to be represented among the 10 group spots given out at this World Championships. If, for example, all the top 10 groups were from European countries, the 9th and 10th spots would go to the highest-placing groups representing countries on other continents. Additional individuals and groups could qualify at the Olympic Games Test Event in April 2016.

== Medal winners ==
Event	Gold	Silver	Bronze
Team Competition
Team All-Around	Russia Yana Kudryavtseva; Margarita Mamun; Aleksandra Soldatova	Belarus Hanna Bazhko; Arina Charopa; Katsiaryna Halkina; Melitina Staniouta	Ukraine Viktoria Mazur; Ganna Rizatdinova; Eleonora Romanova
Individual Finals
Hoop	Margarita Mamun (RUS)	Aleksandra Soldatova (RUS)	Ganna Rizatdinova (UKR)
Ball	Yana Kudryavtseva (RUS)	Margarita Mamun (RUS)	Melitina Staniouta (BLR)
Clubs	Yana Kudryavtseva (RUS)	Aleksandra Soldatova (RUS)	Ganna Rizatdinova (UKR)
Ribbon	Yana Kudryavtseva (RUS)	Margarita Mamun (RUS)	Ganna Rizatdinova (UKR)
All-Around	Yana Kudryavtseva (RUS)	Margarita Mamun (RUS)	Melitina Staniouta (BLR)
Groups Finals
All-Around	Russia; Diana Borisova; Daria Kleshcheva; Anastasia Maksimova; Sofya Skomorokh; Anastasiia Tatareva; Maria Tolkacheva	Bulgaria; Reneta Kamberova; Mihaela Maevska-Velichkova; Tsvetelina Naydenova; Tsvetelina Stoyanova; Hristiana Todorova	Spain; Sandra Aguilar; Artemi Gavezou; Elena López; Lourdes Mohedano; Alejandra Quereda; Lidia Redondo
5 Ribbons	Italy; Martina Centofanti*; Sofia Lodi; Alessia Maurelli; Marta Pagnini; Camilla Patriarca; Andreea Stefanescu	Russia; Diana Borisova; Daria Kleshcheva*; Anastasia Maksimova; Sofya Skomorokh; Anastasiia Tatareva; Maria Tolkacheva	Japan; Airi Hatakeyama; Mao Kunii; Rie Matsubara; Sakura Noshitani*; Sayuri Sugimoto; Kiko Yokota
6 Clubs + 2 Hoops	Russia; Diana Borisova*; Daria Kleshcheva; Anastasia Maksimova; Sofya Skomorokh; Anastasiia Tatareva; Maria Tolkacheva	Italy; Martina Centofanti; Sofia Lodi; Alessia Maurelli; Marta Pagnini; Camilla Patriarca; Andreea Stefanescu*	Bulgaria; Reneta Kamberova; Mihaela Maevska-Velichkova; Tsvetelina Naydenova; Tsvetelina Stoyanova; Hristiana Todorova

* reserve gymnast

== Individual ==
=== Teams Competition and Individual Qualification ===
Team competition is only for countries with at least 3 participating/entries of gymnasts. Only gymnasts competing in at least 3 apparatus can compete for the all-around qualifications; with the top three highest scores counted. The top 24 in qualifications advance to the all-around finals.

Nation/Gymnasts	Hoop (rhythmic gymnastics)	Ball (rhythmic gymnastics)	Clubs (rhythmic gymnastics)	Ribbon (rhythmic gymnastics)	Total
Russia	37.066	36.766	56.416	55.725	149.990
Yana Kudryavtseva		18.933	19.000	18.950	(1)
Margarita Mamun	18.400	17.833	18.683	18.625	(2)
Aleksandra Soldatova	18.666		18.733	18.150	(3)
Belarus		35.099	35.666	52.199	141.314
Melitina Staniouta	18.350	17.716	18.116	17.850	(6)
Katsiaryna Halkina	17.008	17.383	17.550	17.216	(16)
Hanna Bazhko				17.133	
Arina Charopa			16.400		
Ukraine	35.349	34.982	35.499	35.366	141.196
Ganna Rizatdinova	18.366	17.966	18.416	18.450	(4)
Viktoria Mazur	16.983		17.083	16.541	
Eleonora Romanova		17.016	16.683	16.916	(25)
Israel	35.199	35.049	34.699	34.450	139.397
Neta Rivkin	17.866	17.783	17.483	17.250	(9)
Victoria Veinberg Filanovsky	17.333	17.266	17.216	17.200	(18)
Linoy Ashram			16.783	16.666	
Azerbaijan	34.600	34.450	34.416	34.716	138.182
Marina Durunda	17.750	17.750	17.666	17.883	(7)
Ayshan Bayramova	16.850		16.750	16.833	
Elif Celep		16.700	16.333	16.425	
Japan	34.916	46.816	34.049	51.516	137.497
Sakura Hayakawa	17.500	17.016	17.433	17.200	(17)
Uzume Kawasaki			16.491	16.783	
Kaho Minagawa	17.416	16.550	16.616	17.533	(19)
Bulgaria	33.949	34.183	33.866	34.732	136.730
Mariya Mateva	16.733	16.900	16.483	17.216	(24)
Neviana Vladinova	17.216	17.283	17.383	17.516	(14)
Sara Staykova			16.033	16.425	
Uzbekistan	34.100	34.449	34.033	33.983	136.565
Elizaveta Nazarenkova	17.400	17.366	17.400	17.250	(15)
Anora Davlyatova			16.266	16.333	
Anastasiya Serdyukova	16.700	17.083	16.633	16.733	
United States	17.500	33.666	50.391	34.000	135.557
Camilla Feeley			16.525		
Jasmine Kerber	15.375	16.433	16.166	16.091	
Serena Lu				16.700	
Laura Zeng	17.500	17.233	17.233	17.300	(11)
Spain	34.491	33.899	49.49	17.450	135.339
Polina Berezina				14.516	
Natalia Garcia	16.966	16.766	15.966	15.566	
Sara Llana			16.133		
Carolina Rodríguez	17.525	17.133	17.400	17.450	(12)
Georgia	33.866	32.924	34.483	33.700	134.973
Natela Bolataeva	16.233	15.958	16.500	16.150	
Salome Pazhava	17.633	16.966	17.983	17.550	(8)
Salome Urushadze			14.641	15.041	
South Korea	33.633	34.116	33.399	33.616	134.764
Chun Song E	15.700	15.850	15.466	15.350	
Lee Da-ae			14.966	14.683	
Son Yeon-jae	17.933	18.266	17.933	18.266	(5)
Kazakhstan	33.433	16.700	33.799	49.016	132.948
Sabina Ashirbayeva	17.150	16.700	17.233	16.600	(22)
Aliya Assymova	16.283	14.566	16.566	16.258	
Selina Zhumatayeva			16.058	16.158	
Italy	33.566	16.733	33.233	49.357	132.889
Veronica Bertolini	16.933	16.733	17.150	17.033	(21)
Letizia Cicconcelli				15.808	
Maria Carmen Crescenzi			16.083		
Alessia Russo	16.633	15.366	15.300	16.516	
Finland	32.549	32.733	33.749	32.549	131.580
Inessa Rif			14.508	12.616	
Jouki Tikkanen	15.483	16.333	16.666	16.316	
Ekaterina Volkova	17.066	16.400	17.083	16.233	
Austria	32.516	31.983	31.783	32.650	128.932
Anastasiya Detkova			12.333	13.300	
Nicol Ruprecht	16.950	16.400	16.933	17.050	(23)
Natascha Wegscheider	15.566	15.583	14.850	15.600	
China	32.858	15.666	47.300	32.282	128.106
Liu Jiahui	16.675	15.666	16.800	16.466	
Xu Xiaolan	16.183		15.300	15.816	
Zhang Doudou		13.216	15.200	14.416	
Estonia	31.725	31.333	31.416	31.916	126.390
Olga Bogdanova	15.750		15.233	16.166	
Viktoria Bogdanova	15.975	15.733	16.000	15.750	
Carmel Kallemaa		15.600	15.416	15.050	
Mexico	32.158		31.449	46.049	125.722
Rut Castillo	16.008	13.241	14.466	15.600	
Karla Diaz	16.150	16.066	16.216	14.716	
Cindy Gallegos			15.233	15.733	
Canada	31.349	32.149	31.807	30.357	125.662
Patricia Bezzoubenko	15.716	16.866	17.116	15.391	
Carmen Whelan	15.633	15.283	14.483	14.966	
Katherine Uchida			14.691	13.475	
Czech Republic	31.241	31.433	30.350	30.899	123.923
Monika Mickova	15.566	16.083	15.450	14.783	
Anna Sebkova	15.675	15.350	14.900	15.366	
Nataly Hamrikova			14.550	15.533	
Armenia	15.700	15.400	44.166	45.299	120.565
Lilit Harutyunyan	15.700	15.400	15.700	15.816	
Elizabeth Petrosyan	13.158		14.650	15.100	
Luiza Sadyan		13.683	13.816	14.383	
Hungary	31.332	15.950	42.999	29.449	119.730
Lili Margaritisz		13.366	13.566	13.583	
Boglárka Kiss	14.716		14.850	13.541	
Dora Vass	16.616	15.950	14.583	15.866	
Slovenia	29.474	30.358	30.766	28.049	118.647
Monija Cebasek	13.908		10.750	13.050	
Sara Kragulj		15.008	14.916	14.433	
Spela Kratochwill	15.566	15.350	15.850	13.616	
Latvia	15.133	29.250	43.791	28.757	116.931
Jelizaveta Gamalejeva	13.300	14.450	15.700	15.166	
Arina Leina		14.800	13.891	13.591	
Sofija Nikitina	15.133		14.200	12.816	
Portugal	28.907	14.683	43.415	28.916	115.921
Maria Canilhas	14.216		13.541	13.533	
Rafaela Valente	14.691	14.683	15.316	15.383	
Tânia Domingues		12.725	14.558	13.458	
Slovakia	29.616	14.216	42.458	27.532	113.822
Alexandra Cechova	14.233		13.983	13.516	
Xenia Kilianova	15.383	14.216	14.750	14.016	
Karolina Turciakova		12.600	13.725	11.941	
Egypt	26.008	29.758	43.483	14.508	113.757
Nourhal Khattab	12.750	14.908	14.200	12.666	
Sara Rostom	13.258	14.850	15.683	14.508	
Fatma Salman			13.600	12.708	
Belgium	13.841	28.983	42.649	27.774	113.247
Paulien Boone			13.500	14.016	
Najlae Ou-Ghanem	12.000		14.816	12.591	
Joke Verpoest		14.300	14.333		
Kaat Wyers	13.841	14.683		13.758	
Norway	13.716	28.249	28.799	41.391	112.155
Emilie Holte	13.000	14.416	13.650	13.750	
Fanny Lunde			14.441	13.883	
Emilie Swensen	13.716	13.833	14.358	13.758	
Lithuania	27.916	13.691	39.366	26.550	107.523
Veronika Proncenko	14.683	13.691	13.500	13.700	
Olga Stork		12.641	13.200	12.850	
Migle Varnaite	13.233		12.666	12.500	
Sweden	26.916	13.666	27.491	39.174	107.247
Josefine Olsson	13.550	12.566	14.258	12.883	
Jennifer Pettersson	13.366		13.233	13.166	
Cassandra Pettersson		13.666	11.600	13.125	
Bosnia and Herzegovina	24.832	23.299	22.641	24.766	95.538
Adisa Bjelic	13.016	12.433	12.200	12.933	
Amila Hodzic			10.441	7.666	
Dea Muminovic		10.866	10.133		
Vanessa Tinjic	11.816			11.833	
Angola	14.033	6.150	15.183	22.190	57.556
Jandira Henriques			5.833	6.716	
Sofia Higino		5.516		7.258	
Anna Mpanzu	6.933		8.250	8.216	
Alice Tomás	7.100	6.150	6.933		
Other non-Team	---	---	---	---	---
Kseniya Moustafaeva (FRA)	17.283	17.300	17.583	17.666	52.549 (10)
Varvara Filiou (GRE)	17.316	17.350	17.366	17.566	52.282 (13)
Jana Berezko-Marggrander (GER)	17.100	17.083	17.016	16.933	51.199 (20)
Alexandra Piscupescu (ROU)	16.966	16.766	15.966	15.566	49.623
Ana Luiza Filiorianu (ROU)	16.233	16.750	15.533	15.941	48.924
Laura Jung (GER)	15.850	14.800	15.783	15.850	47.483
Natália Gaudio (BRA)	15.500	15.058	15.516	15.750	46.766
Milena Milacic (SRB)	15.566	15.483	15.616	14.408	46.665
Angélica Kvieczynski (BRA)	15.333	15.200	13.466	16.116	46.649
Themida Christodoulidou (CYP)	13.033	14.850	15.766	15.683	46.299
Kyriaki Alevrogianni (GRE)	15.666	14.466	15.216	15.116	45.998
Grace Legote (RSA)	14.533	14.016	15.483	15.158	45.174
Stephani Sherlock (GBR)	14.833	15.025	14.666	15.241	45.099
Michelle Salazar Sanchez (VEN)	15.300	12.425	15.066	14.250	44.616
Irena Omirou (CYP)	14.533	14.166	15.266	14.300	44.099
Sie Yan Koi (MAS)	13.650	15.066	14.700	14.233	43.999
Laura Halford (GBR)	13.625	15.008	15.200	13.200	43.833
Grisbel Lopez Ortega (VEN)	13.841	14.366	14.033	14.350	42.749
Danielle Prince (AUS)	13.975	12.900	14.200	14.550	42.725
Shasangari Sivaneswary Nagarajan (MAS)	12.683	14.891	12.966	14.750	42.607
Elena Milekovic (CRO)	12.966	14.583	12.966	14.316	41.865
Selin Kilavuz (TUR)	13.783	13.591	12.866	14.400	41.774
Laura Bozic (CRO)	14.200	11.958	12.916	14.391	41.407
Lina Dussan (COL)	13.725	12.116	13.650	13.250	40.625
Geraldine Melissa Perez Quito (ECU)	12.833	13.391	13.666	13.216	40.273
Basma Ouatay (MAR)	12.158	12.916	12.833	11.450	37.907
Lucia Catiglioni (SMR)	12.433	12.400	12.750	11.883	37.307
Nicoline Sachmann (DEN)	9.783	7.408	8.466	10.016	28.265
Elyane Boal (CPV)	9.450	8.950	6.975	9.018	27.508
Victoria Sorensen (DEN)	9.383	7.716	9.000	6.291	26.099

=== Hoop ===
Rank	Gymnast	Nation	D Score	E Score	Pen.	Total
1st place, gold medalist(s)	Margarita Mamun	Russia	9.450	9.500		18.950
2nd place, silver medalist(s)	Aleksandra Soldatova	Russia	9.350	9.300		18.650
3rd place, bronze medalist(s)	Ganna Rizatdinova	Ukraine	9.350	9.233		18.583
4	Melitina Staniouta	Belarus	9.150	9.200		18.350
5	Son Yeon-jae	South Korea	9.050	9.075		18.125
6	Marina Durunda	Azerbaijan	8.950	8.966		17.916
7	Salome Pazhava	Georgia	8.800	8.966		17.766
8	Neta Rivkin	Israel	8.050	8.500		16.550

=== Ball ===
Rank	Gymnast	Nation	D Score	E Score	Pen.	Total
1st place, gold medalist(s)	Yana Kudryavtseva	Russia	9.500	9.525		19.025
2nd place, silver medalist(s)	Margarita Mamun	Russia	9.500	9.500		19.000
3rd place, bronze medalist(s)	Melitina Staniouta	Belarus	9.150	9.200		18.350
4	Son Yeon-jae	South Korea	9.050	9.166		18.216
5	Ganna Rizatdinova	Ukraine	8.900	9.233		18.133
6	Neta Rivkin	Israel	8.850	8.966		17.816
7	Marina Durunda	Azerbaijan	8.700	8.900		17.600
8	Katsiaryna Halkina	Belarus	8.650	8.866		17.516

=== Clubs ===
Rank	Gymnast	Nation	D Score	E Score	Pen.	Total
1st place, gold medalist(s)	Yana Kudryavtseva	Russia	9.500	9.566		19.066
2nd place, silver medalist(s)	Aleksandra Soldatova	Russia	9.350	9.233		18.583
3rd place, bronze medalist(s)	Ganna Rizatdinova	Ukraine	9.300	9.266		18.566
4	Melitina Staniouta	Belarus	9.200	9.166		18.366
5	Salome Pazhava	Georgia	9.000	9.000		18.000
6	Marina Durunda	Azerbaijan	8.900	8.933		17.833
7	Laura Zeng	United States	8.800	8.866		17.666
8	Son Yeon-jae	South Korea	8.450	8.733		17.183

=== Ribbon ===
Rank	Gymnast	Nation	D Score	E Score	Pen.	Total
1st place, gold medalist(s)	Yana Kudryavtseva	Russia	9.400	9.466		18.866
2nd place, silver medalist(s)	Margarita Mamun	Russia	9.450	9.400		18.850
3rd place, bronze medalist(s)	Ganna Rizatdinova	Ukraine	9.200	9.233	-0.1	18.383
4	Melitina Staniouta	Belarus	9.150	9.100		18.250
5	Son Yeon-jae	South Korea	9.050	9.033		18.083
6	Marina Durunda	Azerbaijan	8.900	8.900		17.800
7	Kseniya Moustafaeva	France	8.850	8.900		17.750
8	Varvara Filiou	Greece	8.800	8.833		17.633

=== All-Around ===
Rank	Gymnast	Nation	Hoop (rhythmic gymnastics)	Ball (rhythmic gymnastics)	Clubs (rhythmic gymnastics)	Ribbon (rhythmic gymnastics)	Total
1st place, gold medalist(s)	Yana Kudryavtseva	Russia	19.000	19.116	19.000	18.516	75.632
2nd place, silver medalist(s)	Margarita Mamun	Russia	18.750	18.966	19.000	18.050	74.766
3rd place, bronze medalist(s)	Melitina Staniouta	Belarus	18.400	17.783	18.033	17.916	72.132
4	Salome Pazhava	Georgia	18.183	17.750	18.083	17.766	71.782
5	Ganna Rizatdinova	Ukraine	17.675	18.550	17.033	18.283	71.541
6	Marina Durunda	Azerbaijan	17.933	17.983	17.783	17.700	71.399
7	Neta Rivkin	Israel	17.900	17.833	17.925	17.316	70.974
8	Laura Zeng	United States	17.633	17.600	17.633	17.550	70.416
9	Carolina Rodríguez	Spain	17.600	17.516	17.566	17.566	70.248
10	Neviana Vladinova	Bulgaria	17.333	17.633	17.516	17.633	70.115
11	Son Yeon-jae	South Korea	18.166	17.483	18.233	16.116	69.998
12	Kseniya Moustafaeva	France	17.716	17.683	17.233	17.083	69.715
13	Katsiaryna Halkina	Belarus	17.200	17.483	17.550	17.366	69.599
14	Varvara Filiou	Greece	17.600	17.383	17.533	16.933	69.449
15	Kaho Minagawa	Japan	16.900	17.700	17.266	17.533	69.399
16	Elizaveta Nazarenkova	Uzbekistan	17.216	17.250	17.333	17.483	69.282
17	Sakura Hayakawa	Japan	17.166	17.233	17.550	16.766	69.065
18	Sabina Ashirbayeva	Kazakhstan	17.166	17.233	17.266	17.266	68.931
19	Jana Berezko-Marggrander	Germany	17.300	16.466	17.216	17.216	68.198
20	Nicol Ruprecht	Austria	16.983	16.966	17.200	15.550	66.699
21	Victoria Veinberg Filanovsky	Israel	16.533	16.916	17.283	15.800	66.532
22	Viktoriia Mazur	Ukraine	16.716	16.400	16.616	16.483	66.215
23	Veronica Bertolini	Italy	17.016	15.933	16.416	16.800	66.165
24	Mariya Mateva	Bulgaria	16.500	17.133	16.150	16.150	66.049

== Groups ==
At these championships the Russian Federation finally regained the gold medal at the all-around competition, after eight years, the last time they won the competition was at the 2007 World Rhythmic Gymnastics Championships held in Patras, Greece.

=== Group compositions ===
Azerbaijan (AZE)

- (Azerbaijan) Sabina Abbasova
- (Azerbaijan) Nigar Abdusalimova
- (Azerbaijan) Diana Doman
- (Azerbaijan) Aynur Mustafayeva
- (Azerbaijan) Aliaksandra Platonova
- (Azerbaijan) Siyana Vasileva

Belarus (BLR)

- (Belarus) Ksenya Cheldishkina
- (Belarus) Hanna Dudzenkova
- (Belarus) Maria Kadobina
- (Belarus) Maryia Katsiak
- (Belarus) Valeriya Pischelina
- (Belarus) Arina Tsitsilina

Brazil (BRA)

- (Brazil) Dayane Amaral
- (Brazil) Beatriz Francisco
- (Brazil) Morgana Gmach
- (Brazil) Emanuelle Lima
- (Brazil) Jessica Maier
- (Brazil) Ana Paula Ribeiro

Bulgaria (BUL)

- (Bulgaria) Reneta Kamberova
- (Bulgaria) Mihaela Maevska
- (Bulgaria) Tsvetelina Stoyanova
- (Bulgaria) Hristiana Todorova
- (Bulgaria) Tsvetelina Naydenova

Canada (CAN)

- (Canada) Katrina Cameron
- (Canada) Maya Kojevnikov
- (Canada) Lucinda Nowell
- (Canada) Vanessa Panov
- (Canada) Anjelika Reznik
- (Canada) Victoria Reznik

China (CHN)

- (China) Bao Yuqing
- (China) Shu Siyao
- (China) Yang Ye
- (China) Zhao Jingnan
- (China) Zhang Ling

Egypt (EGY)

- (Egypt) Yara Ahmed Baraka
- (Egypt) Heba Khaled El Bourini
- (Egypt) Jacinthe Tarek Eldeeb
- (Egypt) Alia Yassin Elkatib
- (Egypt) Sarah Elkattan
- (Egypt) Aisha Elkolali

Spain (ESP)

- (Spain) Sandra Aguilar
- (Spain) Artemi Gavezou
- (Spain) Elena Lopez
- (Spain) Lourdes Mohedano
- (Spain) Alejandra Quereda
- (Spain) Lidia Redondo

Finland (FIN)

- (Finland) Sonja Kokkonen
- (Finland) Heleri Kolkkanen
- (Finland) Elina Koprinen
- (Finland) Iina Linna
- (Finland) Aino Purje
- (Finland) Kati Rantsi

France (FRA)

- (France) Samantha Ay
- (France) Elena Chabert
- (France) Oceane Charoy
- (France) Marine Letul
- (France) Lea Peinoit

Germany (GER)

- (Germany) Anastasija Khmelnytska
- (Germany) Daniela Potapova
- (Germany) Dara Sajfutdinova
- (Germany) Julia Stavickaja
- (Germany) Sina Tkaltschewitsch
- (Germany) Rana Tokmak

Greece (GRE)

- (Greece) Eleni Doika
- (Greece) Zoi Kontogianni
- (Greece) Michaela Metallidou
- (Greece) Stavroula Samara
- (Greece) Erato Theopistou

Israel (ISR)

- (Israel) Yuval Filo
- (Israel) Alona Koshevatskiy
- (Israel) Ekaterina Levina
- (Israel) Karina Lykhvar
- (Israel) Ida Mayrin

Italy (ITA)

- (Italy) Martina Centofanti
- (Italy) Sofia Lodi
- (Italy) Alessia Maurelli
- (Italy) Marta Pagnini
- (Italy) Camilla Patriarca
- (Italy) Andreea Stefanescu

Japan (JPN)

- (Japan) Airi Hatakeyama
- (Japan) Mao Kunii
- (Japan) Rie Matsubara
- (Japan) Sakura Noshitani
- (Japan) Sayuri Sugimoto
- (Japan) Kiko Yokota

South Korea (KOR)

- (South Korea) Lee Kyung-eun
- (South Korea) Lee Na-young
- (South Korea) Lee Yeon-jong
- (South Korea) Song Hye-rin
- (South Korea) Yang Hyun-jin

Mexico (MEX)

- (Mexico) Diana Casillas
- (Mexico) Luz Morales
- (Mexico) Erandeni Nava
- (Mexico) Maria Eugenia Nava
- (Mexico) Marialicia Ortega Elizondo
- (Mexico) Pamela Reynolds

Poland (POL)

- (Poland) Julia Derus
- (Poland) Karolina Dziubek
- (Poland) Katarzyna Iwanowska
- (Poland) Julia Namaczynska
- (Poland) Adrianna Szatan
- (Poland) Lilianna Walczak

Portugal (POR)

- (Portugal) Maria Costa
- (Portugal) Ana Rita Farinha Barata
- (Portugal) Ines Neiva
- (Portugal) Ines Pinho
- (Portugal) Sasquia Trigo
- (Portugal) Ines Ventura

Russia (RUS)

- (Russia) Diana Borisova
- (Russia) Daria Kleshcheva
- (Russia) Anastasiia Maksimova
- (Russia) Sofya Skomorokh
- (Russia) Anastasiia Tatareva
- (Russia) Maria Tolkacheva

Switzerland (SUI)

- (Switzerland) Gina Duenser
- (Switzerland) Stephanie Kaelin
- (Switzerland) Lisa Rusconi
- (Switzerland) Melanie Soldati
- (Switzerland) Tamara Stanisic
- (Switzerland) Nicole Turuani

Ukraine (UKR)

- (Ukraine) Olena Dmytrash
- (Ukraine) Yevgeniya Gomon
- (Ukraine) Oleksandra Gridasova
- (Ukraine) Valeriia Gudym
- (Ukraine) Anastasiya Voznyak

United States (USA)

- (United States) Kiana Eide
- (United States) Alisa Kano
- (United States) Natalie Mc Giffert
- (United States) Jennifer Rokhman
- (United States) Monica Rokhman
- (United States) Kristen Shaldybin

Uzbekistan (UZB)

- (Uzbekistan) Samira Amirova
- (Uzbekistan) Valeriya Davidova
- (Uzbekistan) Luiza Ganieva
- (Uzbekistan) Zarina Kurbonova
- (Uzbekistan) Marta Rostoburova

=== All-Around ===
Place	Nation	5	6 + 2	Total
1st place, gold medalist(s)	Russia	18.016	18.250	36.266
2nd place, silver medalist(s)	Bulgaria	17.783	17.800	35.583
3rd place, bronze medalist(s)	Spain	17.450	17.450	34.900
4	Italy	17.066	17.716	34.782
5	Japan	17.366	17.316	34.682
6	Israel	17.333	16.950	34.283
7	Belarus	16.383	17.633	34.016
8	China	16.566	16.633	33.199
9	Ukraine	16.400	16.766	33.166
10	Uzbekistan	15.700	16.866	32.566
10	Germany	15.650	16.916	32.566
12	Azerbaijan	15.666	16.866	32.532
13	United States	16.066	16.233	32.299
14	Greece	15.833	16.400	32.233
15	Finland	15.750	16.400	32.150
16	Brazil	16.041	15.900	31.941
17	France	16.133	15.183	31.316
18	South Korea	15.650	15.000	30.650
19	Canada	14.909	15.375	30.283
20	Poland	14.816	15.033	29.849
21	Switzerland	15.475	14.350	29.825
22	Egypt	13.933	13.566	27.499
23	Portugal	13.675	13.516	27.191
24	Mexico	13.416	12.791	26.207

=== 5 Ribbons ===
Rank	Nation	D Score	E Score	Pen.	Total
1st place, gold medalist(s)	Italy	8.900	9.000		17.900
2nd place, silver medalist(s)	Russia	8.750	9.100		17.850
3rd place, bronze medalist(s)	Japan	8.700	8.666		17.366
4	Bulgaria	8.600	8.700		17.300
5	Israel	8.500	8.733		17.233
6	Spain	8.550	8.633		17.183
7	China	8.400	8.433		16.833
7	Ukraine	8.400	8.433		16.833

=== 6 Clubs + 2 Hoops ===
Rank	Nation	D Score	E Score	Pen.	Total
1st place, gold medalist(s)	Russia	9.050	9.075		18.125
2nd place, silver medalist(s)	Italy	9.000	9.100		18.100
3rd place, bronze medalist(s)	Bulgaria	8.900	8.966		17.866
4	Belarus	8.800	8.833		17.633
5	Japan	8.700	8.800		17.500
6	Israel	8.650	8.700		17.350
7	Germany	8.500	8.500		17.000
8	Azerbaijan	8.400	8.166		16.566

== Medal table ==
Rank	Nation	Gold	Silver	Bronze	Total
1	Russia	8	6	0	14
2	Italy	1	1	0	2
3	Belarus	0	1	2	3
4	Bulgaria	0	1	1	2
5	Ukraine	0	0	4	4
6	Japan	0	0	1	1
6	Spain	0	0	1	1
Totals (7 entries)		9	9	9	27
