= Camilla Bini =

Italian rhythmic gymnast

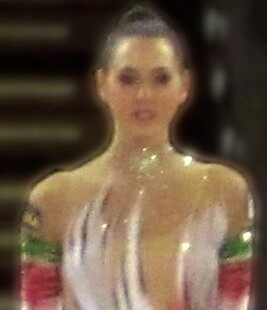

Personal information
- Born: 10 July 1994 (age 32) Cattolica, Italy

Gymnastics career
- Discipline: Rhythmic gymnastics
- Country represented: Italy (2007-2014)
- Club: Aurora Fano
- Head coach: Emmanuela Maccarani
- Former coach: Nani Londarize
- Retired: yes
Medal record
Event	1st	2nd	3rd
World Championships	0	3	0
FIG World Cup	7	2	2
Total	7	5	2
World Championships
Silver medal – second place	2013 Kiev	Group All-around
Silver medal – second place	2013 Kiev	10 Clubs

Camilla Bini (born 10 July 1994) is a retired Italian rhythmic gymnast. She is a world silver medalist.

== Career ==
In December 2006 Camilla won silver with Aurora Fano in the junior group championships in Pesaro. She started 2007 by competing in the junior category of the World Cup in Portimão. Later in the year she took part in the Capriato International Tournament, won bronze in the All-Around at the Memorial Casarin in Udine and gold in a tournament in Biella. In December she was 4th at the Spoleto Cup and got to compete in the Italian Championships in Arezzo.

In 2008 she took part in masterclass training in Moscow along Federica Febbo, Alessia Marchetto and Andreea Stefanescu. In March she was 11th overall at the Thiais Grand Prix. At the Deleanu Cup in Bucharest Camilla, along Febbo and Marchetto, achieved 8th place in teams. At the World Cup in Portimão she finished 26th with rope and 11th with ball. In June she was selected for the European Championships in Turin. There she was 7th in teams and took the same place in the hoop final.

At the Italian Championships in 2009 she won bronze with ball and was 4th with ribbon despite still being junior. Participating in the Capriato Tournament she won silver with clubs and bronze with ball. In the summer she participated in a control training in Chieti. In December she helped Italy taking 4th place in teams, with Chiara Di Battista, Federica Febbo and Andreea Stefanescu, at the Gymnasiade in Doha, also being 10th with ball.

In 2010 Camilla became a senior, winning gold in the Italian Category Championships and performed a gala in the Speciality Championships. At the tournament in Corbeil-Essonnes she took 25th place. At nationals she took 4th place in all events. In November she won silver in the Serie A with her club along Ilaria Landini, Martina Alicata, Lucia Palazzi and Valeria Schiavi. In December she won gold at the Memorial Manola Rosi.

At the 2011 Italian Championships she won bronze in the All-Around, with ball and with clubs. In the summer she performed at the Golden Butterfly Gala and recorded advertisements for the 2012 Olympic Games and Giovanni Rana that became the sponsor of the national team. In November she was included in the national group, with whom she performed during Serie A while she was still competing with Aurora Fano winning another silver. In 2012 the group had a gala in Ferrara, and then was invited to the TV show Zelig.

With the retirement of some gymnasts after the London Olympics, in 2013 Camilla became a starter in the group. In March the Italian group won the bilateral competition with Switzerland. In April Camilla and her teammates won all three golds at the World Cup in Pesaro. In Minsk they won bronze in the All-Around and gold with 10 clubs. During the summer the national group performed galas around Italy. In August she won bronze with 10 clubs at the World Cup in Saint Petersburg. Camilla was then selected for her maiden World Championship in Kyiv. There, along Chiara Ianni, Marta Pagnini, Camilla Patriarca, Valeria Schiavi and Andreea Stefanescu, won silver in the All-Around and with 10 clubs. In November the group took part in the Italian Gymnastics Grand Prix and was awarded at the Gymnastics Oscars.

In March 2014 Camilla and her teammates won two silvers in the event finals at the World Cup in Stuttgart. A month later they won all three golds at the stage in Pesaro. An injury prevented her from competing in the World Championships in Izmir. After the injury protracted into 2015 she made the decision to retire.

After her active career ended she worked as an assistant for Emmanuela Maccarani, the national group head coach, and in 2017 returned on the carpet for a gala.
