= 2013 World Rhythmic Gymnastics Championships =

- Venue: Palace of Sports
- Location: Kyiv, Ukraine
- Start date: 28 August 2013
- End date: 1 September 2013

The 2013 World Rhythmic Gymnastics Championships were held in Kyiv, Ukraine, from 28 August to 1 September, 2013 at the Palace of Sports.

The apparatus finals and all-around qualification round were run concurrently on the first two days of the competition, with all gymnasts competing during the day before the apparatus finals were held.

Russian gymnasts won four of the five individual events, with Hanna Rizatdinova from Ukraine being the only gymnast from another federation to win a gold medal (with hoop). Margarita Mamun from Russia lead the field in qualifications, but she made mistakes in three of four routines in the all-around final and fell to sixth place. Yana Kudryavtseva, also of the Russian Federation, won the all-around title after she performed more cleanly, and she was awarded the highest score of the competition, 18.70, for her clubs routine. She became the youngest individual world all-around champion in rhythmic gymnastics history at the age of 15 years. Rizatdinova won silver, and Melitina Staniouta from Belarus won bronze.

In the group competition, Russia was less dominant, with only one gold in the 3 balls/2 ribbons final. The Belarusian group won the all-around for the first time since the 1998 World Championships. Italy won silver and Russia bronze. In the apparatus finals, Spain won two medals, gold with 5 pairs of clubs and bronze with 3 balls/2 ribbons. An Angolan group competed for the first time at the World Championships.

The Longines Prize for Elegance was awarded to Rizatdinova.

== Schedule ==
28 August 2013 Wednesday

- 10:00–19:15 Individuals Hoop & Ball alternatively (CI)
- 20:00–20:30, Individual Final (CIII) Hoop
- 20:30–21:00, Individual Final (CIII) Ball
- Following Award ceremony Hoop
- Following Award ceremony Ball

29 August 2013 Thursday

- 10:00–19:15, Individuals Clubs & Ribbon alternatively (CI)
- 20:00–20:30 Individual Final (CIII) Clubs
- 20:30–21:00 Individual Final (CIII) Ribbon
- Following Award ceremony Clubs
- Following Award ceremony Ribbon

30 August 2013, Friday

- 14:00–16:00 Individuals All-Around Final Group B (CII) (rank 13–24)
- 17:00–19:00 Individuals All-Around Final Group A (CII) (rank 1–12)
- Following Award ceremony Individuals All-Around

31 August 2013, Saturday

- 15:00–17:15 10 Clubs and 3 Balls + 2 Ribbons alternatively (CI)
- 17:45–20:00 10 Clubs and 3 Balls + 2 Ribbons alternatively (CI)
- Following Award ceremony Groups All-Around Competition

1 September 2013, Sunday

- 15:00–15:40 Groups 10 Clubs (CIII)
- 15:50–16:30 Groups 3 Balls + 2 Ribbons (CIII)
- Following Award ceremony Groups 10 Clubs
- Following Award ceremony Groups 3 Balls + 2 Ribbons
- 18:00 Closing ceremony and Gala

== Medal winners ==
Event	Gold	Silver	Bronze
Individual Finals
Hoop	Ganna Rizatdinova (UKR)	Yana Kudryavtseva (RUS)	Margarita Mamun (RUS)
Ball	Margarita Mamun (RUS)	Yana Kudryavtseva (RUS)	Melitina Staniouta (BLR)
Clubs	Yana Kudryavtseva (RUS)	None awarded	Alina Maksymenko (UKR)
Clubs	Margarita Mamun (RUS)	None awarded	Alina Maksymenko (UKR)
Ribbon	Yana Kudryavtseva (RUS)	Ganna Rizatdinova (UKR)	Melitina Staniouta (BLR)
All-Around	Yana Kudryavtseva (RUS)	Ganna Rizatdinova (UKR)	Melitina Staniouta (BLR)
Groups Finals
All-Around	Belarus; Hanna Dudzenkova; Maryna Hancharova; Maryia Katsiak; Yana Lukovets; Aliaksandra Narkevich; Valeria Pishchelina	Italy; Camilla Bini; Chiara Ianni; Marta Pagnini; Camilla Patriarca; Valeria Schiavi; Andreea Stefanescu	Russia; Anastasia Bliznyuk; Ksenia Dudkina; Olga Ilina; Anastasia Maksimova; Anastasia Nazarenko; Elena Romanchenko
10 Clubs	Spain; Sandra Aguilar; Artemi Gavezou Castro; Elena López; Lourdes Mohedano; Alejandra Quereda	Italy; Camilla Bini; Chiara Ianni*; Marta Pagnini; Camilla Patriarca; Valeria Schiavi; Andreea Stefanescu	Ukraine; Olena Dmytrash; Yevgeniya Gomon; Valeriia Gudym; Viktoria Mazur*; Svitlana Prokopova; Viktoriia Shynkarenko
3 Balls + 2 Ribbons	Russia; Anastasia Bliznyuk; Ksenia Dudkina; Olga Ilina; Anastasia Maksimova; Anastasia Nazarenko; Elena Romanchenko*	Belarus; Hanna Dudzenkova; Maryna Hancharova; Maryia Katsiak; Yana Lukovets; Aliaksandra Narkevich; Valeria Pishchelina*	Spain; Sandra Aguilar; Artemi Gavezou Castro; Elena López; Lourdes Mohedano; Alejandra Quereda

* reserve gymnast

== Individual ==
=== Competitors ===
- (Angola) Anna Mpanzu
- (Angola) Nkumba Francisco
- (Armenia) Lilit Harutyunyan
- (Armenia) Anna Svirina
- (Australia) Danielle Prince
- (Australia) Jaelle Cohen
- (Austria) Natascha Wegscheider
- (Austria) Nicol Ruprecht
- (Azerbaijan) Lala Yusifova
- (Azerbaijan) Marina Durunda
- (Belgium) Elisabeth De Leeuw
- (Belarus) Katsiaryna Halkina
- (Belarus) Melitina Staniouta
- (Brazil) Natalia Azevedo Gaudio
- (Brazil) Angelica Kvieczynski
- (Bulgaria) Mariya Mateva
- (Bulgaria) Silviya Miteva
- (Canada) Annabelle Kovacs
- (Canada) Patricia Bezzoubenko
- (Chile) Valentina Andrea Castro Zumaran
- (Chile) Valeska Lissette Gonzalez Olivares
- (China) Yuqing Yang
- (China) Senyue Deng
- (Croatia) Mirjana Sekovanic
- (Croatia) Elena Milenkovic
- (Cyprus) Pantelitsa Theodoulou
- (Cyprus) Themida Christodoulidou
- (Czech Republic) Monika Mickova
- (Egypt) Sara Mohmed Rostom
- (Egypt) Yasmine Mohmed Rostom
- (Spain) Natalia Garcia
- (Spain) Carolina Rodriguez
- (Estonia) Olga Bogdanova
- (Estonia) Viktoria Bogdanova
- (Finland) Jouki Tikkanen
- (Finland) Ekaterina Volkova
- (France) Kseniya Moustafaeva
- (France) Lucille Chalopin
- (Georgia (country)) Liana Tsetsadze
- (Georgia (country)) Salome Phajava
- (Germany) Laura Jung
- (Germany) Jana Berezko-Marggrander
- (Greece) Kyriaki Alevrogianni
- (Greece) Varvara Filiou
- (Guatemala) Linda Esperanza Sandoval Maldonado
- (Hungary) Bianka Borocz
- (Hungary) Dora Vass
- (India) Palak Kour Bijral
- (India) Nishtha Shah
- (Israel) Neta Rivkin
- (Israel) Victoria Veinberg Filanovsky
- (Italy) Alessia Russo
- (Italy) Veronica Bertolini
- (Japan) Kaho Minagawa
- (Japan) Sakura Hayakawa
- (Kazakhstan) Aliya Assymova
- (Kazakhstan) Viktoriya Gorbunova
- (South Korea) Yeon Jae Son
- (Latvia) Natalija Janusa
- (Latvia) Jelizaveta Gamalejeva
- (Lithuania) Karolina Sklenyte
- (Lithuania) Anastasija Grisanina
- (Moldova) Veronica Cumatrenco
- (Moldova) Iuliana Liubomeiscaia
- (Mexico) Cynthia Yasmin Valdez Perez
- (Mexico) Rut Castillo Galindo
- (Norway) Marie Therese Ruud
- (Norway) Emilie Holte
- (Poland) Anna Czarniecka
- (Poland) Maja Majerowska
- (Portugal) Maria Canilhas
- (Portugal) Carolina Coelho
- (Romania) Alexandra Piscupescu
- (South Africa) Aimee Van Rooyen
- (South Africa) Grace Legote
- (Russia) Margarita Mamun
- (Russia) Yana Kudryavtseva
- (Singapore) Daphne Theresa Chia
- (Slovenia) Monija Cebasek
- (Slovenia) Mojca Rode
- (San Marino) Giulia Di Lorenzo
- (San Marino) Elisa Cavalli
- (Slovakia) Xenia Kilianova
- (Sweden) Anastassia Johansson
- (Sweden) Jennifer Pettersson
- (Thailand) Panjarat Prawatyotin
- (Thailand) Anyavarin Supateeralert
- (Turkey) Elif Zeynep Celep
- (Turkey) Burcin Neziroglu
- (Ukraine) Alina Maksymenko
- (Ukraine) Ganna Rizatdinova
- (United States) Jasmine Kerber
- (United States) Rebecca Sereda
- (Uzbekistan) Anastasiya Serdyukova
- (Uzbekistan) Djamila Rakhmatova
- (Venezuela) Andreina Acevedo
- (Venezuela) Michelle Steffanie Sanchez Salazar
- (Vietnam) Mai Nhat Linh Truong

=== Qualification ===
- The top 8 scores in individual apparatus qualifies to the apparatus finals and the top 24 in overall qualification scores advance to the all-around final.
- Only the 3 best results (bold) are counted in the total score.

Rank	Gymnast	Nation	Hoop (rhythmic gymnastics)	Ball (rhythmic gymnastics)	Clubs (rhythmic gymnastics)	Ribbon (rhythmic gymnastics)	Total
1	Margarita Mamun	Russia	18.300	18.333	18.350	18.466	55.149
2	Yana Kudryavtseva	Russia	18.316	18.266	18.300	18.400	55.016
3	Ganna Rizatdinova	Ukraine	18.250	18.000	18.200	17.750	54.450
4	Alina Maksymenko	Ukraine	17.850	17.783	18.100	16.616	53.733
5	Melitina Staniouta	Belarus	17.733	17.950	17.416	17.316	53.099
6	Son Yeon-jae	South Korea	17.550	17.400	17.300	16.108	52.250
7	Silviya Miteva	Bulgaria	17.516	17.183	17.466	17.225	52.207
8	Deng Senyue	China	17.200	17.000	17.200	16.191	51.400
9	Marina Durunda	Azerbaijan	17.000	16.883	16.666	16.883	50.766
10	Neta Rivkin	Israel	16.783	16.633	17.150	16.616	50.566
11	Carolina Rodriguez	Spain	16.483	17.083	16.816	16.650	50.549
12	Katsiaryna Halkina	Belarus	16.508	17.100	15.966	15.633	49.574
13	Jana Berezko-Marggrander	Germany	16.500	16.800	16.208	15.983	49.508
14	Kseniya Moustafaeva	France	16.616	16.150	16.683	15.316	49.449
15	Varvara Filiou	Greece	15.650	16.783	15.616	16.950	49.383
16	Alexandra Piscupescu	Romania	16.250	16.750	14.116	16.266	49.266
17	Lala Yusifova	Azerbaijan	16.350	14.175 (52)	16.525	16.183	49.058
18	Salome Pazhava	Georgia	16.133	16.050	16.683	16.050	48.866
19	Natalia Garcia	Spain	16.316	16.350	16.183	15.166	48.849
20	Jasmine Kerber	United States	16.133	16.283	16.383	15.533	48.799
21	Djamila Rakhmatova	Uzbekistan	16.133	16.600	15.908	16.016	48.749
22	Rebecca Sereda	United States	15.983	16.466	16.133	15.083	48.582
23	Victoria Veinberg Filanovsky	Israel	16.166	16.050	15.783	15.433	47.999
24	Laura Jung	Germany	14.683	16.075	16.000	15.866	47.941
25	Patricia Bezzoubenko	Canada	15.933	16.050	15.883	15.708	47.866
26	Veronica Bertolini	Italy	15.641	16.000	15.883	13.125	47.524
27	Ekaterina Volkova	Finland	15.433	15.850	15.733	15.483	47.066
28	Jouki Tikkanen	Finland	15.666	15.483	14.100	15.683	46.832
29	Alessia Russo	Italy	15.433	15.466	14.350	15.616	46.515
30	Mariya Mateva	Bulgaria	15.633	16.033	13.925	14.666	46.332
31	Jelizaveta Gamalejeva	Latvia	15.350	15.100	15.183	14.666	45.633
32	Dora Vass	Hungary	15.191	15.241	15.183	12.750	45.615
33	Angelica Kvieczynski	Brazil	15.433	15.266	14.833	14.766	45.532
34	Liana Tsetsadze	Georgia	14.933	14.933	14.991	15.416	45.340
35	Natalia Gaudio	Brazil	14.550	15.283	14.733	15.283	45.299
36	Minagawa Kaho	Japan	14.816	15.266	14.958	14.783	45.040
...	...	...	...	...	...	...	...
97	Nishtha Shah	India	5.750		5.716		17.882

=== Hoop ===
Rank	Gymnast	Nation	D Score	E Score	Pen.	Total
1st place, gold medalist(s)	Ganna Rizatdinova	Ukraine	9.200	9.066		18.266
2nd place, silver medalist(s)	Yana Kudryavtseva	Russia	9.150	9.100		18.250
3rd place, bronze medalist(s)	Margarita Mamun	Russia	9.100	9.133		18.233
4	Alina Maksymenko	Ukraine	8.950	9.000		17.950
5	Melitina Staniouta	Belarus	8.900	8.900		17.800
6	Sylvia Miteva	Bulgaria	8.800	8.866		17.666
7	Son Yeon-jae	South Korea	8.525	8.633		17.158
8	Deng Senyue	China	8.400	8.533		16.933

=== Ball ===
Rank	Gymnast	Nation	D Score	E Score	Pen.	Total
1st place, gold medalist(s)	Margarita Mamun	Russia	9.350	9.166		18.516
2nd place, silver medalist(s)	Yana Kudryavtseva	Russia	9.150	9.200		18.350
3rd place, bronze medalist(s)	Melitina Staniouta	Belarus	9.100	9.066		18.166
4	Sylvia Miteva	Bulgaria	8.950	8.966		17.916
5	Alina Maksymenko	Ukraine	8.400	9.000		17.400
6	Ganna Rizatdinova	Ukraine	8.550	8.500		17.050
7	Son Yeon-jae	South Korea	8.325	8.333		16.658
8	Katsiaryna Halkina	Belarus	8.000	8.500		16.500

=== Clubs ===
Rank	Gymnast	Nation	D Score	E Score	Pen.	Total
1st place, gold medalist(s)	Yana Kudryavtseva	Russia	9.100	9.266		18.366
1st place, gold medalist(s)	Margarita Mamun	Russia	9.100	9.266		18.366
3rd place, bronze medalist(s)	Alina Maksymenko	Ukraine	9.050	9.166		18.216
4	Ganna Rizatdinova	Ukraine	8.850	9.033		17.883
5	Deng Senyue	China	8.950	8.866		17.816
6	Son Yeon-jae	South Korea	8.700	8.866		17.566
7	Melitina Staniouta	Belarus	8.700	8.866	0.30	17.266
8	Sylvia Miteva	Bulgaria	7.950	8.033		15.983

=== Ribbon ===
Rank	Gymnast	Nation	D Score	E Score	Pen.	Total
1st place, gold medalist(s)	Yana Kudryavtseva	Russia	9.250	9.266		18.516
2nd place, silver medalist(s)	Ganna Rizatdinova	Ukraine	9.100	9.133		18.233
3rd place, bronze medalist(s)	Melitina Staniouta	Belarus	9.000	9.066		18.066
4	Varvara Filiou	Greece	8.800	8.800		17.600
5	Marina Durunda	Azerbaijan	8.700	8.800		17.500
5	Margarita Mamun	Russia	8.800	8.700		17.500
7	Carolina Rodriguez	Spain	8.450	8.733		17.183
8	Sylvia Miteva	Bulgaria	7.700	7.833		15.533

=== All-Around ===
Rank	Gymnast	Nation	Hoop (rhythmic gymnastics)	Ball (rhythmic gymnastics)	Clubs (rhythmic gymnastics)	Ribbon (rhythmic gymnastics)	Total
1st place, gold medalist(s)	Yana Kudryavtseva	Russia	18.533	18.550	18.700	18.083	73.866
2nd place, silver medalist(s)	Ganna Rizatdinova	Ukraine	18.466	18.250	17.975	18.350	73.041
3rd place, bronze medalist(s)	Melitina Staniouta	Belarus	17.950	18.116	18.200	17.900	72.166
4	Deng Senyue	China	17.900	17.450	17.916	17.108	70.374
5	Son Yeon-jae	South Korea	17.783	17.683	17.350	17.516	70.332
6	Margarita Mamun	Russia	17.833	18.350	17.266	16.841	70.290
7	Alina Maksymenko	Ukraine	17.850	17.541	16.100	17.633	69.124
8	Varvara Filiou	Greece	17.100	17.233	16.316	17.633	68.282
9	Sylvia Miteva	Bulgaria	16.016	16.650	17.083	17.416	67.165
10	Neta Rivkin	Israel	17.083	17.375	15.916	16.533	66.907
11	Carolina Rodriguez	Spain	15.633	17.500	16.966	16.683	66.782
12	Kseniya Moustafaeva	France	17.050	15.700	16.900	16.066	65.716
13	Lala Yusifova	Azerbaijan	16.450	16.583	16.133	16.366	65.532
13	Jana Berezko-Marggrander	Germany	16.650	16.883	15.616	16.383	65.532
15	Katsiaryna Halkina	Belarus	16.633	17.083	17.050	14.716	65.482
16	Marina Durunda	Azerbaijan	15.600	16.150	16.666	16.466	64.882
17	Alexandra Piscupescu	Romania	16.533	16.950	15.433	15.633	64.549
18	Djamila Rakhmatova	Uzbekistan	16.425	16.150	16.083	15.816	64.474
19	Natalia Garcia	Spain	15.641	16.600	15.250	16.466	63.957
20	Salome Phajava	Georgia	16.425	16.516	14.983	15.983	63.907
21	Victoria Veinberg Filanovsky	Israel	16.100	15.766	16.166	15.700	63.732
22	Jasmine Kerber	United States	15.866	15.666	15.850	16.100	63.482
23	Laura Jung	Germany	14.733	16.066	15.400	15.991	62.190
24	Rebecca Sereda	United States	15.366	16.266	14.250	15.116	60.998

== Groups ==
=== Group compositions ===
- (Angola) Beniude Panguleipo
- (Angola) Margarida Cabral
- (Angola) Ana Ferreira
- (Angola) Yolanda Gaspar
- (Angola) Jandira Henriques
- (Angola) Milka Kodjo
- (Austria) Sophia Lindtner
- (Austria) Anastasiya Detkova
- (Austria) Daniela Hohl
- (Austria) Anna Theresa Hosp
- (Austria) Julia Meder
- (Austria) Vanessa Nachbaur
- (Azerbaijan) Sabina Garatova
- (Azerbaijan) Sabina Abbasova
- (Azerbaijan) Irada Ahadzade
- (Azerbaijan) Mansura Bagiyeva
- (Azerbaijan) Siyana Vasileva
- (Azerbaijan) Aliya Pashayeva
- (Belarus) Valeriya Pischelina
- (Belarus) Hanna Dudzenkova
- (Belarus) Maryna Hancharova
- (Belarus) Maryia Katsiak
- (Belarus) Aliaksandra Narkevich
- (Belarus) Yana Lukavets
- (Brazil) Debora Andreazi Falda
- (Brazil) Bianca Mendonça
- (Brazil) Gabriela Paixao Ribeiro
- (Brazil) Dayane Amaral
- (Brazil) Beatriz Francisco
- (Brazil) Francielly Machado Pereira
- (Bulgaria) Hristiana Todorova
- (Bulgaria) Tsvetelina Stoyanova
- (Bulgaria) Tsvetelina Naydenova
- (Bulgaria) Reneta Kamberova
- (Bulgaria) Mihaela Maevska
- (Bulgaria) Snezhana Decheva
- (Chile) Maria Soto Avila
- (Chile) Daniela Poblete Robles
- (Chile) Barbara Araya Rubio
- (Chile) Sara Rojas Munizaga
- (Chile) Catalina Alexandra Nunez Campusano
- (Chile) Rocio Caibul Diaz
- (China) Ding Ziyi
- (China) Yang Ye
- (China) Zhao Jingnan
- (China) Zhang Ling
- (China) Zhang Doudou
- (China) Bao Yuqing
- (Cuba) Legna de la Caridad Savon Diaz
- (Cuba) Martha Perez Rodriguez
- (Cuba) Adriana Ramirez Blanco
- (Cuba) Arecnev Isabella Jimenez Osoria
- (Cuba) Zenia Rosa Fernandez Cutino
- (Cuba) Camila Garcia Bravo
- (Czech Republic) Vendula Zamorska
- (Czech Republic) Katerina Gerychova
- (Czech Republic) Veronika Hegrova
- (Czech Republic) Lenka Siroka
- (Czech Republic) Anna Sebkova
- (Czech Republic) Martina Svedova
- (Spain) Sandra Aguilar
- (Spain) Artemi Gavezou Castro
- (Spain) Elena Lopez
- (Spain) Alejandra Quereda
- (Spain) Lourdes Mohedano
- (Finland) Solja Sade
- (Finland) Jenni Kaita
- (Finland) Riikka Kangas
- (Finland) Sonja Kokkonen
- (Finland) Heleri Kolkkanen
- (Finland) Aino Purje
- (France) Noemie Balthazard
- (France) Lea Peinoit
- (France) Oceane Charoy
- (France) Elena Chabert
- (France) Julie Marques
- (France) Samantha Ay
- (Germany) Judith Hauser
- (Germany) Anastasija Khmelnytska
- (Germany) Anastasia Kempf
- (Germany) Sara Radman
- (Germany) Rana Tokmak
- (Germany) Daniela Potapova
- (Greece) Eleni Doika
- (Greece) Charikleia Smyrli
- (Greece) Stavroula Samara
- (Greece) Zoi Kontogianni
- (Greece) Ioanna Anagnostopoulou
- (Hungary) Blanka Boldizsar
- (Hungary) Csinszka Horvath
- (Hungary) Sarolta Toth
- (Hungary) Nora Zita Raub
- (Hungary) Zsuzsanna Franciska Kun
- (Hungary) Barbara Kiss
- (Israel) Ekaterina Levina
- (Israel) Irina Kurzanov
- (Israel) Shir Hillel
- (Israel) Ida Mayrin
- (Israel) Adar Elhaik
- (Israel) Grace Nehmi
- (Italy) Valeria Schiavi
- (Italy) Marta Pagnini
- (Italy) Andreea Stefanescu
- (Italy) Chiara Ianni
- (Italy) Camilla Bini
- (Italy) Camilla Patriarca
- (Japan) Midori Kahata
- (Japan) Airi Hatakeyama
- (Japan) Rie Matsubara
- (Japan) Nina Saeedyokota
- (Japan) Sayuri Sugimoto
- (Japan) Sakura Noshitani
- (Kazakhstan) Ardak Kumisbayeva
- (Kazakhstan) Nazgul Abduali
- (Kazakhstan) Akbota Kalimzhanova
- (Kazakhstan) Yelena Maryassova
- (Kazakhstan) Viktoriya Pereverzeva
- (Kazakhstan) Zhannet Zhaboyeva
- (South Korea) Kim Hee-ryeong
- (South Korea) Lee Kyung-eun
- (South Korea) Lee Na-young
- (South Korea) Lee Ji-woo
- (South Korea) Yang Hyun-jin
- (Mexico) Nelly Gonzalez Llanos
- (Mexico) Maria Fernanda Castillo Casanova
- (Mexico) Maria Eugenia Nava del Rio
- (Mexico) Cossette Ommundsen G Canton
- (Mexico) Marialicia Ortega Elizondo
- (Mexico) Estefany Sosa Alvarado
- (Poland) Dagmara Bak
- (Poland) Zuzanna Klajman
- (Poland) Aleksandra Kubiak
- (Poland) Marina Milona
- (Poland) Patrycja Romik
- (Portugal) Anzhelika Faydevych
- (Portugal) Patricia A. E. Pereira de Silva
- (Portugal) Patricia de Sousa E Silva
- (Portugal) Ana Rita Farinha Barata
- (Portugal) Beatriz M. S. Goncalves Tojal
- (Portugal) Ines Pedro Ventura
- (Russia) Olga Ilina
- (Russia) Anastasia Bliznyuk
- (Russia) Ksenia Dudkina
- (Russia) Anastasiia Maksimova
- (Russia) Anastasia Nazarenko
- (Russia) Elena Romanchenko
- (Switzerland) Lisa Tacchelli
- (Switzerland) Nathanya Koehn
- (Switzerland) Lisa Rusconi
- (Switzerland) Nicole Turuani
- (Switzerland) Julia Eva Novak
- (Switzerland) Stephanie Kaelin
- (Ukraine) Oleksandra Aslanyan
- (Ukraine) Olena Dmytrash
- (Ukraine) Svitlana Prokopova
- (Ukraine) Yevgeniya Gomon
- (Ukraine) Valeriia Gudym
- (Ukraine) Viktoriia Mazur
- (United States) Alisa Kano
- (United States) Monica Rokhman
- (United States) Jennifer Rokhman
- (United States) Natalie Mc Giffert
- (United States) Sharon Dassouli
- (United States) Laura Tutunikov
- (Uzbekistan) Evgeniya Larionova
- (Uzbekistan) Ekaterina Bukhenko
- (Uzbekistan) Zarina Kurbonova
- (Uzbekistan) Olga Kiryakova
- (Uzbekistan) Luiza Ganieva
- (Uzbekistan) Marta Rostoburova

=== All-Around ===
Place	Nation	10	3 + 2	Total
1st place, gold medalist(s)	Belarus	17.783	17.925	35.708
2nd place, silver medalist(s)	Italy	17.600	17.133	34.733
3rd place, bronze medalist(s)	Russia	16.775	17.450	34.225
4	Spain	17.133	16.816	33.949
5	Bulgaria	15.783	17.150	32.933
6	China	16.683	15.900	32.583
7	Azerbaijan	15.666	16.166	31.832
8	Japan	16.116	15.533	31.649
9	Germany	15.800	15.758	31.558
10	Switzerland	15.900	15.266	30.866
11	Greece	15.600	15.399	30.699
12	Brazil	15.650	14.733	30.383
13	France	15.250	14.766	30.016
14	United States	15.450	14.766	29.916
15	Ukraine	15.550	14.366	29.266
16	Czech Republic	13.900	14.800	28.700
17	Israel	14.325	14.099	28.424
18	South Korea	13.975	14.333	28.008
19	Uzbekistan	13.900	13.499	27.399
20	Finland	14.625	13.566	27.291
21	Poland	13.975	13.133	27.108
22	Kazakhstan	12.800	12.991	25.791
23	Portugal	13.150	12.991	25.649
24	Hungary	11.700	11.325	22.725
25	Mexico	11.900	10.199	22.099
26	Austria	11.025	10.699	21.124
27	Cuba	11.800	9.925	20.625
28	Chile	7.100	9.133	16.233
29	Angola	4.500	4.932	9.132

=== 10 Clubs ===
Rank	Nation	D Score	E Score	Pen.	Total
1st place, gold medalist(s)	Spain	8.750	8.600		17.350
2nd place, silver medalist(s)	Italy	8.700	8.600		17.300
3rd place, bronze medalist(s)	Ukraine	8.850	8.358		17.208
4	China	8.500	8.300		16.800
5	Russia	8.600	7.600		16.200
6	Belarus	8.300	7.733		16.033
7	Germany	8.050	7.800		15.850
8	Japan	7.800	7.866		15.666

=== 3 Balls + 2 Ribbons ===
Rank	Nation	D Score	E Score	Pen.	Total
1st place, gold medalist(s)	Russia	9.250	8.933		18.183
2nd place, silver medalist(s)	Belarus	9.150	8.400		17.550
3rd place, bronze medalist(s)	Spain	8.700	8.466		17.166
4	Italy	8.600	8.408	0.30	16.708
5	Bulgaria	8.500	7.866	0.30	16.066
6	China	8.175	7.833		16.008
7	Japan	8.300	7.700		16.000
8	Azerbaijan	8.200	7.100		15.300

== Medal table ==
Rank	Nation	Gold	Silver	Bronze	Total
1	Russia	6	2	2	10
2	Ukraine	1	2	2	5
3	Belarus	1	1	3	5
4	Spain	1	0	1	2
5	Italy	0	2	0	2
Totals (5 entries)		9	7	8	24
