= Federica Febbo =

Italian rhythmic gymnast

- Nickname: Fede
- Born: 13 May 1993 (age 33) Chieti, Italy

Gymnastics career
- Discipline: Rhythmic gymnastics
- Country represented: Italy
- Club: Armonia d'Abruzzo
- Head coach: Germana Germani
Medal record
Junior European Championships
Bronze medal – third place	2008 Torino	Ribbon

Federica Febbo (born 13 May 1993) is a retired Italian rhythmic gymnast who represented her country in international competitions.

== Career ==
Febbo took up rhythmic gymnastics at age six. As a junior she made her debut in December 2007 at the International Spoleto Cup, where she took silver behind Andreea Stefanescu. Two weeks later she took part in the national championships.

The following year she entered the national team was 5th at the LA Lights tournaments. She then was 15th at the Moscow Grand Prix. At the World Cup in Portimão she entered the hoop and ribbon finals, taking 4th place in the latter. These results had her selected for the European Championships in Turin. There she was 7th in teams and won bronze in the ribbon final. In December she was the runner up in the Italian club championships with Armonia d'Abruzzo.

In 2009, her first year as senior, she won bronze in the All-Around at nationals behind Julieta Cantaluppi and Chiara Ianni, also winning silver with ball and ribbon and bronze with rope. In June she was selected for the Mediterranean Games in Pescara, in the end she was named a reserve and did not compete. In July she took 4th place at the Chieti tournament. In September she was selected for her maiden World Championships in Mie, competing only with ball and ribbon she was 32nd and 28th respectively as well as 8th in teams. With Armonia d'Abruzzo she won the serie a. In December, at the Gymnasiada, she was 4th in teams and 6th in the All-Around.

At the 2010 World Cup in Kalamata she was 14th overall. After taking 13th place at the World Cup in Minsk she won bronze overall at nationals, where she also won bronze with hoop, ball and ribbon. She won another bronze at the Prato international tournament, behind Evgenia Kanaeva and Cantaluppi. In August she was unable to participate in the World Cup in Pesaro due to injury. At the World Championships in Moscow Febbo took 37th place in the All-Around, 36th with rope, 43rd with hoop, 41st with ball, 35th with ribbon and 9th in teams. In October she helped Armonia finish 7th at the AEON Cup in Japan. Two months later Armonia retained the national club title.

In 2011 she was 20th at the Grand Prix in Moscow. At the World Cup in Pesaro she was 22nd in the All-Around. In Kalamata she finished 19th, two weeks later Febbo took 13th place in Kyiv. At the European Championships she was 25th with hoop, 29th with ball, 18th with clubs and 20th with ribbon. A the Italian Championships she won silver in the All-Around, with clubs and ribbon, gold with hoop and ball. Selected for the World Championships in Montpellier she finished 28th in the All-Around, 30th with hoop and with ball, 27th with clubs, 28th with ribbon and 7th in teams. In October Federica was invited along Cantaluppi in a TV quiz show. In December she won her 3rd club championship with Armonia.

In 2012 she competed at the qualification event for the 2012 Olympic Games, she finished in 8th place and so did not qualify. In April she was 25th overall at the World Cup in Pesaro. A month later she ended in 14th place in Sofia. At nationals she conquered four silver medals and one bronze. She ended the year winning another club championship.

At the 2013 World Cup in Bucharest she finished 13th overall. A week later she was 20th in the All-Around and 9th with ribbon in Pesaro. She was 15th at the stage in Minsk. In June she competed at the European Championships in Vienna, where she took 9th place in teams along Veronica Bertolini. In June she was again the runner up at the national championships. In the summer Febbo competed in the Mediterranean Games, finishing 4th in the All-Around. Participating in the Universiade she was 9th overall. An injury prevented her from taking part in the World Championships. In December she won her 6th national club championship.

In 2014 Febbo won bronze in the All-Around and silver with hoop at nationals. In November she helped Armonia win silver in serie a. She retired at the end of the year.
