= Chiara Ianni =

Italian rhythmic gymnast

- Born: 25 December 1991 (age 34) Popoli, Italy
- Height: 1.68 m (5 ft 6 in)

Gymnastics career
- Discipline: Rhythmic gymnastics
- Country represented: Italy; (2006-2013)
- Club: Armonia D'Abruzzo
- Head coach: Emanuela Maccarani
- Former coach: Germana Germani
- Choreographer: Gjergj Bodari
- Retired: yes
Medal record
Representing Italy
Rhythmic Gymnastics
World Championships
Silver medal – second place	2013 Kiev	Group All-around
Silver medal – second place	2013 Kiev	10 Clubs

Chiara Ianni (born 25 December 1991) is an Italian retired rhythmic gymnast and coach. She represented her country in international competitions.

== Career ==
Chiara took up the sport aged 8, training at Armonia D'Abruzzo under Anna Mazziotti and then Germana Germani. In 2005 she won gold at the Italian Championships in the junior division, a year later she retained her title and was selected for the European Championships in Moscow where she took 7th place in teams and 10th with ribbon.

She made her debut as a senior in 2007 by taking 3rd place in the national championships. In 2008 she won silver in an international tournament in Chieti, and in one in Minsk, she also won the Italian club championships with Armonia D'Abruzzo. The following year she competed in the European Championships in Baku, taking 20th place in the All-Around and 9th in teams. At the World Championships in Mie she was 36th in the All-Around, 32nd with rope, 34th with hoop, 37th with ball, 46th with ribbon and 8th in teams.

In 2010 she was 7th in the ball final at the Grand Prix in Moscow. Later Armonia D'Abruzzo won again the club championships and took 6th place in the Aeon Cup. She won again the national club championships in 2012 and 2013.

She was included in the national senior group in 2013, winning three gold medals at the World Cup in Pesaro. In August the group won bronze in the All-Around and gold with 10 clubs in Minsk. In Saint Petersburg they got bronze with 10 clubs. Ianni was then selected for the World Championships in Kyiv along Camilla Bini, Marta Pagnini, Camilla Patriarca, Valeria Schiavi and Andreea Stefanescu, they won silver in the All-Around and with 10 clubs. After that she was awarded the silver medal for sport merit.

After her retirement she graduated from Gabriele D'Annunzio University in physical education. She's serving as a coach for the national Italian junior group.
