= Valeriya Pischelina =

Belarusian rhythmic gymnast (born 1995)

- Full name: Valeriya Iharauna Pischelina
- Born: 27 February 1995 (age 31)
- Height: 1.70 m (5 ft 7 in)

Gymnastics career
- Discipline: Rhythmic gymnastics
- Country represented: Belarus; (2015)
- Club: Rhythmic Gymnastics; Republican Centre of Olympic Preparation
- Head coach: Tatiana Nenasheva
- Assistant coach: Katsiaryna Bialiauskaya
- Choreographer: Volha Strakhava
Medal record
Representing Belarus
Group rhythmic gymnastics
World Championships
Gold medal – first place	2013 Kyiv	Group all-around
Silver medal – second place	2013 Kyiv	3 Balls + 2 Ribbons
European Championships
Gold medal – first place	2016 Holon	5 Ribbons
Silver medal – second place	2016 Holon	Group all-around
Junior European Championships
Bronze medal – third place	2009 Baku	5 Ribbons

Valeriya Iharauna Pischelina (Belarusian: Валерыя Ігараўна Пішчэліна; Russian: Валерия Игоревна Пищелина; born 27 February 1995) is a Belarusian female rhythmic gymnast. Pischelina won a silver medal as a member of the national squad at the 2016 European Championships in Holon, Israel, and eventually competed alongside her teammates Maria Kadobina, Hanna Dudzenkova, Maryia Katsiak, and Arina Tsitsilina at the 2016 Summer Olympics in Rio de Janeiro, finishing outside of medals in the group all-around final with a fifth-place score of 35.299.
