= Daria Kleshcheva =

Russian rhythmic gymnast (born 1998)

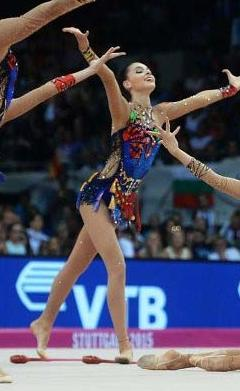

Personal information
- Born: 22 January 1998 (age 28) Novocherkassk, Russia
- Height: 175 cm (5 ft 9 in)

Gymnastics career
- Discipline: Rhythmic gymnastics
- Country represented: Russia
- Head coach: Irina Viner
- Assistant coach: Tatiana Sergaeva
- Choreographer: Tatiana Pomerantseva
- Retired: 2016
Medal record
Group Rhythmic Gymnastics
Representing Russia
Event	1st	2nd	3rd
World Championships	2	0	0
European Games	2	0	0
Total	2	0	0
World Championships
Gold medal – first place	2015 Stuttgart	Group All-around
Gold medal – first place	2015 Stuttgart	6 Clubs + 2 Hoops
European Games
Gold medal – first place	2015 Baku	Group All-around
Gold medal – first place	2015 Baku	5 Ribbons

Darya Alexandrovna Kleshcheva (Russian: Дарья Александровна Клещёва; born 22 January 1998) is a Russian rhythmic gymnast.

== Career ==
=== Senior ===
Kleshcheva was included in the Russian group in 2015, she won two gold medals (All-Around and 3 pairs of clubs + 2 hoops) at the 2015 World Championships in the Porsche Arena in Stuttgart. In the same year, she won two gold medals at the 2015 European Games in Baku.

== Awards ==
- 2016: Honored Master of Sports of Russia
