= Zhang Doudou =

Chinese rhythmic gymnast

Personal information
- Native name: 张豆豆
- Nationality: Chinese
- Born: July 23, 1996 (age 29) Taiyuan, Shanxi, China
- Occupation: Rhythmic gymnast
- Years active: 2006-2017

Sport
- Sport: Rhythmic gymnastics
- Retired: 2017
Medal record
Representing China
Asian Championships
Gold medal – first place	2013 Tashkent	Group all-around

Zhang Doudou (Chinese: 张豆豆; pinyin: Zhāng Dòudòu; born July 23, 1996) is a retired individual and group Chinese rhythmic gymnast from Taiyuan, Shanxi, China. She competed at two World Championships as both an individual and a group member. In January 2014, she was awarded the title of "International Sports Master" by the State General Administration of Sports.

She retired in August 2017 and now works as a coach.

== Career ==
Zhang began rhythmic gymnastics when she was 9.

In August 2006, Zhang competed in the National Championships of Rhythmic Gymnastics for Teenagers as a member of Shanxi's team in Zhuhai.

In October 2009, she competed in the 11th National Games of China in Dezhou. In the hoop final, she ranked fourth, and in the ball final, she ranked fifth.

In June 2013, Zhang competed at the 2013 Asian Championships as a member of the Chinese group, and they won the gold medal in the group all-around and the 3 balls + 2 ribbons final and silver in the 10 clubs final. Later that year, she competed with the group at her first World Championships and came in 6th. In September, she competed in the 12th National Games of China in Shenyang and ranked 5th in the group all-around as a member of Shanxi's team. After that, she won an award named "Sportsman of the Year".

In April 2015, Zhang competed in the 2015 National Championships of Rhythmic Gymnastics in Xi'an and won the bronze medal in the all-around. In September, she competed in 2015 World Championships in Stuttgart, this time as an individual, where she placed 76th in the all-around qualification.

In August 2017, she competed in the 13th National Games of China with Zhao Yating as members of Shanxi's team, and Zhang ranked 8th. She retired after the competition.

After retirement, she became a coach of the national rhythmic gymnastics team.

In March 2019, Zhang was torchbearer for the Olympic Flame of the Second National Youth Games.

== Competitive history ==
International: Senior
Year	Event	AA	Team	Hoop	Ball	Clubs	Ribbon
2016	Asian Championships Tashkent	17		20	22	21	15
2015	World Championships Stuttgart	76	17		82	70	83
2015	World Cup Kazan	41		33	42	37	45

=== Reality shows ===
Year	Title	Chinese title	Note	Ref.
2020	Super Penguin League; Season:3	超级企鹅联盟super3	Manager; Live Basketball Competition	

== Awards ==
Year	Award name	References
2013	Sportsman of the Year	
2014	International Sport Master	
