= Lala Yusifova =

Azerbaijani rhythmic gymnast (born 1996)

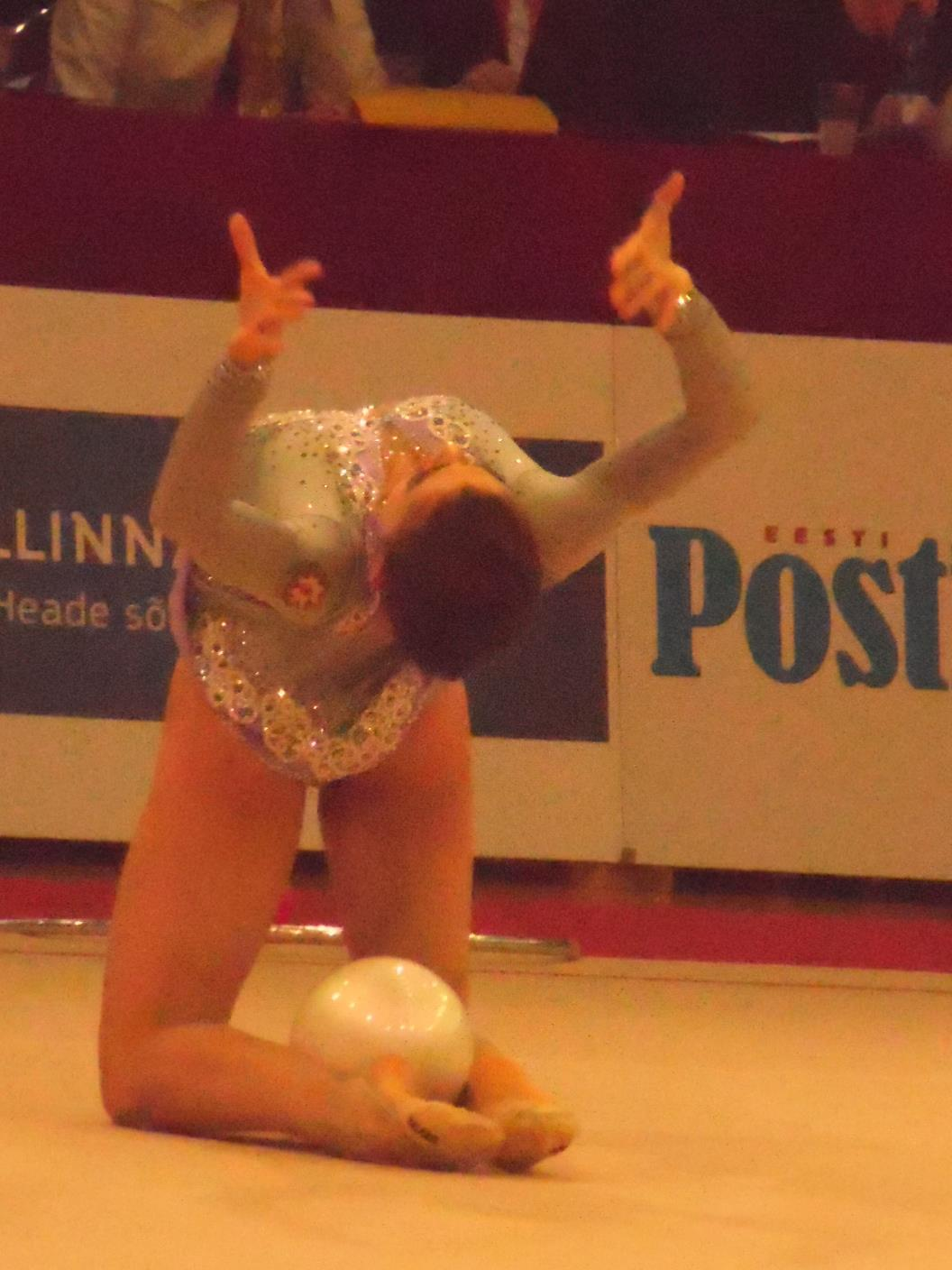
- Yusifova performing with the ball at Miss Valentine in 2013

Personal information
- Full name: Lala Yusifova
- Born: 16 October 1996 (age 30) Baku, Azerbaijan

Gymnastics career
- Discipline: Rhythmic gymnastics
- Country represented: United Kingdom
- Former countries represented: Azerbaijan
- Head coach: Mariana Vasileva
- Assistant coach: Natalia Bulanova
- World ranking: 39 (2014 Season); 12 (2013 Season); 28 (2012 Season)
Medal record
Representing Azerbaijan
Rhythmic Gymnastics
Junior European Championships
Silver medal – second place	2010 Bremen	Ball
Bronze medal – third place	2011 Minsk	5 Ropes
Grand Prix Final
Silver medal – second place	2012 Brno	Ribbon
Silver medal – second place	2012 Brno	Clubs
Bronze medal – third place	2013 Berlin	Clubs

Lala Yusifova (Azerbaijani: Lalə Yusifova, born 16 October 1996) is an Azerbaijani rhythmic gymnast currently competing for Great Britain.

== Career ==
=== Junior ===
Yusifova began competing in as a junior in international competition in 2009. She won the silver medal in ball at the 2010 European Junior Championships and briefly competed as a member of the Azerbaijani group who won the bronze medal 2011 European Junior Championships in Minsk.

=== Senior ===
Yusifova debuted as a full senior in 2012. In the absence of most veteran rhythmic gymnasts competing in the Grand Prix series after the 2012 Summer Olympics, she was able to compete at the 2012 Grand Prix Final in Brno. There, she won silver medals in ribbon and clubs behind the reigning Olympic silver medalist Daria Dmitrieva.

In 2013, at the 2013 Miss Valentine Cup in Tartu, Estonia, Yusifova won the bronze medal in hoop, and she won another at the 2013 Irina Deleanu Cup. She competed at the 2013 European Championships in Vienna, Austria where she and teammate Marina Durunda represented Azerbaijan and finished 4th in the team event. She qualified to the clubs final and finished 7th at the final.

At the 2013 Azerbaijan National Championships, she won the silver medal behind champion Marina Durunda. At the 2013 World Cup Final in Saint Petersburg, Russia, she finished 8th in the all-around and qualified for the ball final, where she finished 8th. Yusifova tied for 13th place with Jana Berezko-Marggrander in the all-around at the 2013 World Championships.

She competed at the 2013 Grand Prix Brno and finished 9th in the all-around, then at the 2013 Grand Prix Final in Berlin, where she finished 6th in all-around. She qualified to four event finals and won bronze in clubs. At the 2013 Aeon Cup in Tokyo, Japan, Yusifova finished 5th in the team event and 6th in the all-around finals.

In 2014, Yusifova missed the early season due to a shoulder injury. In April, she returned to competition at the 2014 Azerbaijan National Championships, where she won the all-around silver medal behind reigning national champion Marina Durunda. Yusifova competed in her first international event of the season at the 2014 Corbeil-Essonnes World Cup and finished 16th in the all-around. She qualified to the ball event final and finished 6th.

Shortly after her brief return, Yusifova announced her retirement on September 3.

==== Comeback ====
In October 2024, she announced on her social media that she was returning to competitive rhythmic gymnastics.

In 2025, she represented Great Britain at the international tournament Miss Valentine in Tartu, Estonia. She took 17th place in hoop and 19th place in clubs.

== Personal life ==
Yusifova is a mother of two children - a boy and a girl. She is currently living in London and coaching at London Sport Academy Putney Ltd. In 2024, she opened her own club for rhythmic gymnastics - Lala Yusifova Gymnastics Academy.

== Routine music information ==
Year	Apparatus	Music title
2025	Hoop	Under Oath by Chroma Music
2025	Ball	
2025	Clubs	Vikings (Hey Ho) by Hedegaard
2025	Ribbon	
2014	Hoop	
2014	Ball	Childhood Remembered by Kevin Kern
2014	Clubs	Nazende Sevgilim by Bilen Yildirir
2014	Ribbon	Dum-Taka by Elitsa Todorova
2013	Hoop	God's Fury by Udi Harpaz
2013	Ball	Limelight (Main Theme) by André Rieu ft The Johann Strauss Orchestra
2013	Clubs	"Cosmos" by Stoyan Yankoulov, Miroslav Ivanov, Elitsa Todorova
2013	Ribbon	Men In Black by Alexey Garnizov
2012	Hoop	A Time For Us music from Romeo and Juliet (1968) by Caroline Campbell
2012	Ball	unknown
2012	Clubs	unknown Azeri folk
2012	Ribbon	Serdtse obzhigaya (Сердце обжигая) by Didulya
