= Viktoriya Pereverzeva =

Kazakhstani rhythmic gymnast

Viktoriya Pereverzeva (born 13 October 1996) is a Kazakhstani rhythmic gymnast.

She competed at the 2013 World Rhythmic Gymnastics Championships.
