= Zhannet Zhaboyeva =

Kazakhstani rhythmic gymnast

Zhannet Zhaboyeva (born 12 July 1997) is a Kazakhstani rhythmic gymnast.

She competed at the 2013 World Rhythmic Gymnastics Championships.
