= Neta Rivkin =

Israeli rhythmic gymnast

- נטע ריבקין
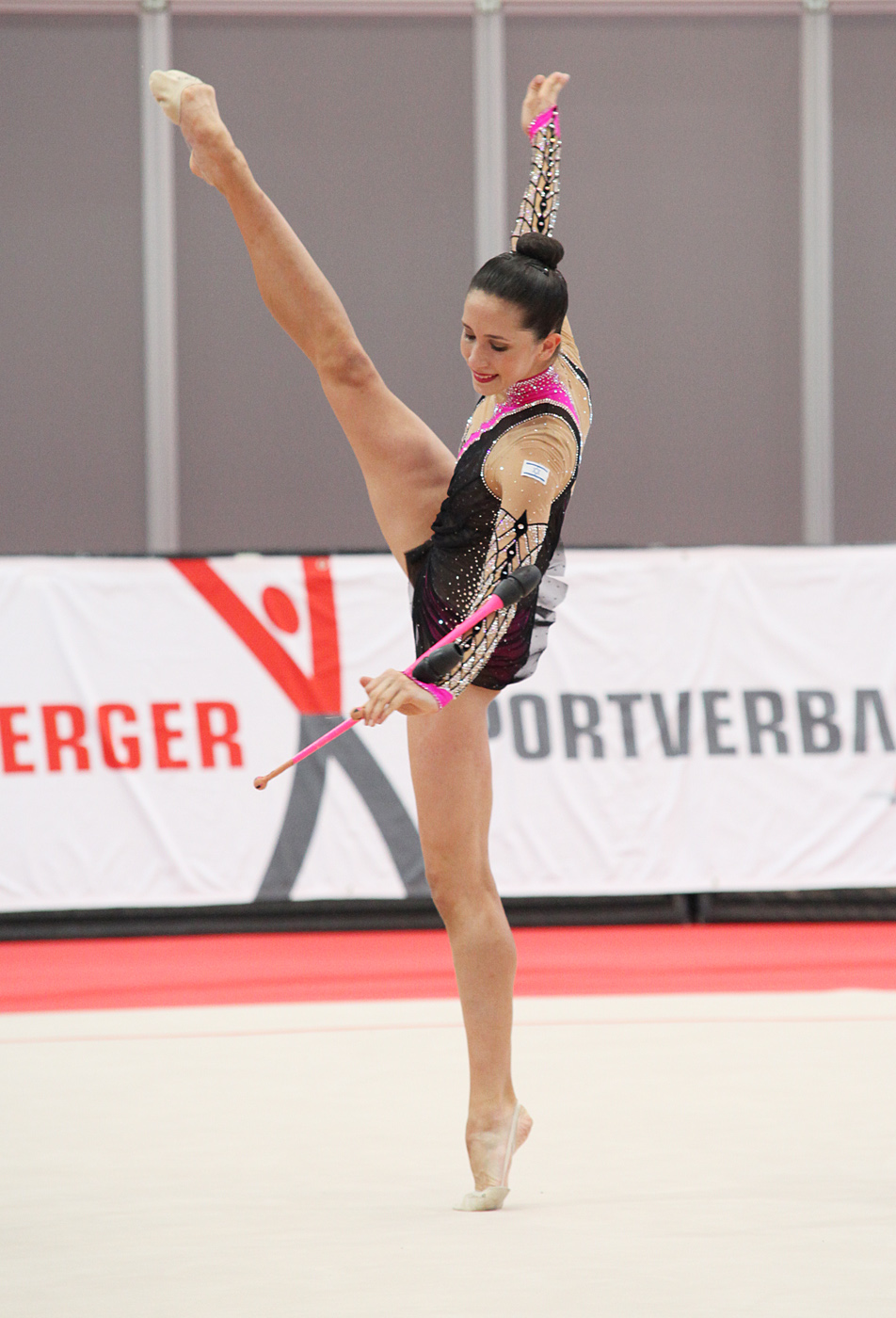
- Rivkin at the 2012 Grand Prix Vorarlberg

Personal information
- Born: June 19, 1991 (age 35) Petah Tikva, Israel
- Height: 5 ft 7 in (170 cm)

Gymnastics career
- Discipline: Rhythmic gymnastics
- Country represented: Israel; (2007–16)
- Club: Maccabi Tel Aviv
- Head coach: Ella Samofalov
- Assistant coach: Elena "Lena" Zelikman
- Choreographer: Ayelet Zussman
- Retired: 2016
- World ranking: 7 (2016 Season); 10 (2015 Season); 10 (2014 Season); 10 (2013 Season); 5 (2012 Season); 11 (2011 Season)
Medal record
Rhythmic Gymnastics
Representing Israel
World Championships
Bronze medal – third place	2011 Montpellier	Hoop
European Games
Bronze medal – third place	2015 Baku	Hoop
European Championships
Silver medal – second place	2011 Minsk	Clubs
Grand Prix Final
Silver medal – second place	2014 Innsbruck	All-around
Silver medal – second place	2014 Innsbruck	Hoop

Neta Rivkin (Hebrew: נטע ריבקין; born June 19, 1991) is a retired Israeli individual rhythmic gymnast.

She is one of Israel's most successful rhythmic gymnasts. A three-time Olympian, in 2011 she won the silver medal in clubs at the 2011 European Championships. That same year she also won a bronze medal in the individual hoop final at the 2011 World Championships. She won the all-around silver medal at the 2014 Grand Prix Final.

== Personal life ==
Rivkin was born in Petah Tikva, Israel, to parents Veronica and Arkady who immigrated to Israel from St. Petersburg, Russia, in 1991.

She studied at Ono Academic College for a bachelor's degree in education and society, with a specialization in sports.

== Rhythmic gymnastics career ==
Rivkin was coached by Ella Samofalov. When asked in 2008 whether she had suffered a "missed childhood", she said: "It's true. I don't know what it's like to be a 'normal kid,' I've been a gymnast since I was six and I don't know anything else, but I don't think I'm missing out on anything. Not everyone qualifies for the Olympics."

=== 2008 ===
Rivkin competed on behalf of Israel at the 2008 Summer Olympics in Beijing, China, coming in 14th. She was the youngest member of the Israeli Olympics delegation, having just turned 17 years of age.

=== 2011 ===
In May 2011, she won a silver medal in the individual hoop competition at the 2011 Rhythmic Gymnastics European Championships in Minsk, Belarus. She also earned a silver medal in the clubs apparatus competition, behind Liubov Charkashyna of Belarus.

In September 2011, at the age of 20, she won a bronze medal in the individual hoop final at the Rhythmic Gymnastics World Championships in Montpellier, France. It was the first world rhythmic gymnastics medal won by an Israeli. She finished behind Russian Olympic champion Evgenia Kanaeva, and Russian Daria Kondakova. Rivkin said: "Words cannot describe what I'm feeling and my joy. I have a powerful desire to bring more achievements to our small and beautiful land."

=== 2012 ===
In 2012, Rivkin won the silver medal in All-around at the World Cup series in Tashkent. She competed at the 2012 Summer Olympics, in London. She qualified for the finals and finished 7th overall. Rivkin was the flag bearer of Israel at the closing ceremony at the 2012 Summer Olympics.

=== 2013 ===
Rivkin training interview for the 2012 Olympics

In 2013, Rivkin withdrew from the Holon Grand Prix due to an illness. She returned to competition at the 2013 Thiais Grand Prix, where she finished 5th in all-around and won a bronze in the ball final. At the 2013 Pesaro World Cup, Rivkin finished 4th in all-around, and won another bronze in the ball final. She won the silver medal in ball (tied with Sylvia Miteva of Bulgaria) at the Sofia World Cup. Rivkin finished 7th in all-around at the 2013 Minsk World Cup, and won a bronze medal in the hoop final. She then competed at the 2013 European Championships in Vienna, Austria. She qualified for the event finals, and finished 6th in hoop and 7th in ball. At the 2013 Summer Universiade in Kazan, she finished 5th in all-around ahead of Korean Son Yeon-Jae.

She won the all-around gold medal at the 2013 Maccabiah Games in Jerusalem, Israel. She finished 11th in All-around at the 2013 World Cup series in St. Petersburg, Russia. Rivkin finished 10th at the 2013 World Championships All-around final.

=== 2014 ===
In the 2014 season, Rivkin began her competition at the 2014 Moscow Grand Prix and finished 8th in the all-around. She won the bronze in all-around in her second event at the 2014 Thiais Grand Prix, and qualified for four event finals. She finished 5th in all-around at the 2014 Debrecen World Cup. Rivkin then competed at the 2014 Stuttgart World Cup, where she finished 10th in all-around, in event finals: she finished 4th in clubs, 4th in ribbon, and 8th in hoop. Rivkin finished 4th in all-around at the 2014 Holon Grand Prix and qualified for 4 event finals: she won gold in Hoop (tied with Margarita Mamun), silver medals in clubs and ball, and bronze in ribbon. Rivkin then competed at the 2014 Pesaro World Cup, where she finished 10th in all-around. On May 22–24, Rivkin competed at the 2014 Tashkent World Cup, where she finished 4th in all-around. She qualified for all 4 event finals, and won a bronze medal in hoop. She followed her event at the 2014 Minsk World Cup, where she finished 11th in all-around behind Son Yeon-Jae. On June 10–15, Rivkin competed at the 2014 European Championships and finished 4th in all-around with an overall score of 71.599, .050 less than bronze medal winner Ganna Rizatdinova. An inquiry was filed regarding Rivkin's score by the Israeli Gymnastics Federation, but was rejected.

On September 5–7, at the 2014 World Cup series in Kazan, Russia, she finished 7th in all-around with a total of 69.350 points. She qualified for 3 event finals. On September 22–28, Rivkin (along with teammates Victoria Veinberg Filanovsky and Martina Poplinsky) represented Israel at the 2014 World Championships, where Team Israel finished in 4th place. She qualified for 3 event finals, and finished 9th in the all-around behind Katsiaryna Halkina. On November 1–3, Rivkin won the all-around silver at the 2014 Grand Prix Brno behind Margarita Mamun. On November 14–16, at the 2014 Grand Prix Final in Innsbruck, Austria, Rivkin won the silver medal in the all-around and hoop finals.

=== 2015 ===
In the 2015 season, she competed at the 2015 Moscow Grand Prix, finishing 5th in all-around. She qualified for 3 event finals, taking bronze in hoop, 4th in ball, and 5th in clubs. On March 13–15, Rivkin then won bronze at the Trophy de Barcelona in the all-around. In March, Rivkin then won bronze at the Trophy de Barcelona in the all-around, and at the 2015 Thiais Grand Prix won the bronze medal in the all-around, gold in hoop, silver in ball and bronze in clubs final. On March 27–29, Rivkin competed at the 2015 Lisboa World Cup, finishing 7th in the all-around. She qualified for two event finals, taking silver in ribbon and placing 8th in ball. On April 10–12, Rivkin finished 13th in the all-around at the 2015 Pesaro World Cup after a penalty from her ribbon routine. She qualified to 3 event finals. Rivkin and teammate Victoria Veinberg Filanovsky competed at the 2015 European Championships where Team Israel finished 4th, she qualified to 2 event finals finishing 6th in clubs and 7th in ball. Rivkin finished 4th in all-around at the 2015 Holon Grand Prix, she qualified to all apparatus finals and won bronze in hoop, ball. On May 22–24, Rivkin finished 6th in all-around at the 2015 Tashkent World Cup and qualified to 3 event finals.

At the 2015 Grand Prix Berlin, Rivkin finished 4th in all-around with a total of 71.350 points. She qualified to 3 event finals and won silver in ball. On June 15–21, Rivkin competed at the inaugural 2015 European Games where she finished 10th in the all-around, she qualified to 3 event finals: taking bronze in hoop, finished 5th in ball and 6th in ribbon. In August, Rivkin competed at the 2015 Budapest World Cup finishing 14th in all-around, she qualified to 1 event final, finishing 7th in hoop. In her next competition at the 2015 Sofia World Cup, Rivkin then finished 10th in the all-around behind Katsiaryna Halkina of Belarus. She qualified to 2 apparatus finals finishing 8th in hoop and clubs. At the 2015 World Cup series in Kazan, Rivkin finished 7th in the all-around and qualified apparatus finals in hoop, clubs. On September 9–13, Rivkin (together with teammates Victoria Veinberg Filanovsky and Linoy Ashram) competed at the 2015 World Championships in Stuttgart, with Team Israel finishing 4th. She qualified to 2 apparatus finals finishing 8th in Hoop and 6th in Ball. Rivkin also qualified to the all-around finals finishing in 7th place with a total of 70.974 points.

=== 2016 ===
In 2016, Rivkin began her season competing at the 2016 Grand Prix Moscow finishing 17th in the all-around. On February 26–28, Rivkin competed at the 2016 Espoo World Cup finishing 5th in the all-around. In apparatus finals; she placed 5th in hoop, ribbon, 6th in ball, and 8th in clubs. On March 17–20, Rivkin for the first time was able to stand on the all-around podium in a World Cup event held at the 2016 Lisboa World Cup winning the all-around bronze. On May 13–15, Rivkin competed at the 2016 Tashkent World Cup finishing 4th in the all-around (71.350) after throwing her ribbon out of the carpet on her last routine, Rivkin qualified to 3 apparatus finals: taking silver in ball, bronze in hoop and placed 8th in clubs. She finished 5th in the all-around at the 2016 Minsk World Cup. Rivkin suffered an ankle injury and withdrew from the 2016 European Championships, she was replaced by Linoy Ashram. On July 22–24, culminating the World Cup of the season in 2016 Baku World Cup, Rivkin returned to competition where she finished 7th in the all-around with a total of 71.200 points, she qualified to 2 apparatus finals taking bronze in ball and 4th in ribbon.

Rivkin was the flag bearer of the Israeli team at the opening ceremony of the 2016 Summer Olympics, her third Olympic Games, at the age of 24. In her first rotation, the ball, she scored 17.866 and was in 6th place out of 26 competitors, but she dropped the hoop and ribbon in her next two rotations. She came in 13th overall in the individual qualification round, with a total score of 69.223 points, and consequently did not advance into the top 10 finals.

Describing her training, she said that the sport:

"takes you to the brink of your abilities. Let’s just say that most of what we do is stuff the human body is not meant to be doing. Every element of every exercise requires thousands of rehearsals to reach perfection, and then you still continue practicing it. Full-time employment for a person in an office is 180 hours a month. I train for 270 hours, and then it is all funneled to 90 seconds of performing."

Rivkin announced her retirement at the end of the 2016 season.

=== 2017 ===
Rivkin took part in the torch lighting ceremony at the 2017 Maccabiah Games on July 6, 2017.

=== After retirement ===
She is a mental advisor to athletes and business executives. Her motivational speech "winning against yourself" is commissioned by fortune 500 companies and top ranking universities from around the world.

== Detailed Olympic results ==
Year	Competition Description	Location	Music	Apparatus	Score-Final	Score-Qualifying
2012	Olympics	London		All-around	109.000	108.900
2012	Olympics	London	Arez by Stanislav Zeltser	Ribbon	27.000	27.725
2012	Olympics	London	Adios by Stanislav Zeltser	Ball	26.850	26.200
2012	Olympics	London	Arabica/Toro-Koko, Pek-Pek by Didulya	Hoop	27.350	27.450
2012	Olympics	London	Joke Tango by Stanislav Zeltser	Clubs	27.800	27.525

== See also ==
- Sports in Israel

Olympic Games
Preceded by Shahar Tzuberi	Flagbearer for Israel; Rio de Janeiro 2016	Succeeded by Hanna Knyazyeva-Minenko & Yakov Toumarkin
