= Mariya Mateva =

Bulgarian rhythmic gymnast

- Born: 1 June 1994 (age 32) Burgas, Bulgaria
- Height: 168 cm (5 ft 6 in)

Gymnastics career
- Discipline: Rhythmic gymnastics
- Country represented: Bulgaria (2008-2016)
- Club: Olympia 74
- Head coach: Efrosina Angelova
- Assistant coach: Ina Ananieva
- Retired: yes

Mariya Mateva (born 1 June 1994) is a former Bulgarian rhythmic gymnast. She represented her country at international level.

== Personal life ==
Born in Burgas, Bulgaria, her hobbies are music, painting. Mateva speaks Bulgarian and English.

== Career ==
=== Junior ===
Mateva first big competition was the 2008 Junior European Championship in Turin, where she performed with ribbon, ending 4th in the apparatus final.

=== Senior ===
Mariya competed at the 2010 World Championship in Moscow, where she performed with rope and ribbon not advancing to any final and taking 7th place in the team competition.

2014 saw her performing at the World Cup in Sofia, reaching the 9th place in the clubs' final, the European Championship where she was 11th in the All-Around, and the World Championship helping Bulgaria to finish 7th in the team final and she reached the 14th place in the All-Around final.

Mateva competed in three World Cup stages in 2015, Pesaro where she ending the All-Around in 19th, Tashkent where she was 4th in the ball final, and Lisbon finishing 6th with hoop and with clubs, before the European Championship in Minsk where she didn't reach any final and was 10th with the team. She was then selected to compete at the 1st European Games in Baku along Neviana Vladinova, where she didn't reach finals and was 17th in the All-Around. In September she took part in the World Championship finishing 24th in the All-Around and 7th in the team competition.

Scoliosis, a curvature of the spine, lead to her being dropped from the Bulgarian squad in February 2016 by national coach Efrosina Angelova taking her by surprise and making it her official retirement from the sport.
