= Hanna Dudzenkova =

Belarusian rhythmic gymnast (born 1994)

- Full name: Hanna Dudzenkova
- Born: 7 May 1994 (age 32) Hrodna, Belarus
- Height: 1.67 m (5 ft 6 in)

Gymnastics career
- Discipline: Rhythmic gymnastics
- Country represented: Belarus (2015)
- Club: Rhythmic Gymnastics; Republican Centre of Olympic Preparation
- Head coach: Tatiana Nenasheva
- Assistant coach: Katsiaryna Bialiauskaya
- Choreographer: Volha Strakhava
Medal record
Representing Belarus
Group rhythmic gymnastics
World Championships
Gold medal – first place	2013 Kyiv	Group all-around
Silver medal – second place	2013 Kyiv	3 Balls + 2 Ribbons
European Championships
Gold medal – first place	2016 Holon	5 Ribbons
Silver medal – second place	2016 Holon	Group all-around
Junior European Championships
Bronze medal – third place	2009 Baku	5 Ribbons

Hanna Siarheyeuna Dudzenkova (Belarusian: Ганна Сяргееўна Дудзянкова, Russian: Анна Сергеевна Дуденкова; born 7 May 1994) is a Belarusian female rhythmic gymnast. Dudzenkova won a silver medal as a member of the national squad at the 2016 European Championships in Holon, Israel, and eventually competed alongside her teammates Maria Kadobina, Maryia Katsiak, Valeriya Pischelina, and Arina Tsitsilina at the 2016 Summer Olympics in Rio de Janeiro, finishing outside of medals in the group all-around final with a fifth-place score of 35.299.
