= Elif Celep =

Turkish rhythmic gymnast

- Full name: Elif Zeynep Celep
- Born: 1 January 1994 (age 32)

Gymnastics career
- Discipline: Rhythmic gymnastics
- Country represented: Azerbaijan (2015)
- Last updated on: 1 March 2017.

Elif Zeynep Celep (born 1 January 1994) is a former Turkish individual rhythmic gymnast who now competes for Azerbaijan. She represents her nation at international competitions. She competed at world championships, including at the 2015 World Rhythmic Gymnastics Championships.

== See also ==
- Nationality changes in gymnastics
