= 2011 Rhythmic Gymnastics European Championships =

- Location: Minsk, Belarus
- Start date: 25 May 2011
- End date: 29 May 2011

The 27th Rhythmic Gymnastics European Championships was held in Minsk, Belarus from 25 to 29 May 2011.

== Medal winners ==
Event	Gold	Silver	Bronze
Senior Finals
Team	Russia; Daria Dmitrieva; Evgenia Kanaeva; Daria Kondakova	Belarus; Liubou Charkashyna; Hanna Rabtsava; Melitina Staniouta	Ukraine; Alina Maksymenko; Ganna Rizatdinova
Hoop	Evgenia Kanaeva; Russia	Daria Kondakova; Russia	Liubou Charkashyna; Belarus
Ball	Liubou Charkashyna; Belarus	Evgenia Kanaeva; Russia	Daria Dmitrieva; Russia
Clubs	Liubou Charkashyna; Belarus	Neta Rivkin; Israel	Alina Maksymenko; Ukraine
Ribbon	Evgenia Kanaeva; Russia	Daria Kondakova; Russia	Silviya Miteva; Bulgaria
Junior Groups Finals
Group All-around	Belarus; Darya Antukhevich; Krystsina Kastsevich; Maryia Katsiak; Alesia Lozka; Aliaksandra Papova; Katsiaryna Smousenok	Russia; Ralina Rakipova; Evgeniya Sheryaeva; Daria Svatkovskaya; Ekaterina Tarasova; Anna Trubnikova; Natalia Vlasova	Israel; Adar Elhaik; Alona Koshevatskiy; Irina Kurzanov; Ekaterina Levina; Inna Naroditski; Alina Petrov
5 ropes	Russia; Ralina Rakipova; Evgeniya Sheryaeva; Daria Svatkovskaya; Ekaterina Tarasova; Anna Trubnikova; Natalia Vlasova	Belarus; Darya Antukhevich; Krystsina Kastsevich; Maryia Katsiak; Alesia Lozka; Aliaksandra Papova; Katsiaryna Smousenok	Azerbaijan; Mansura Bagiyeva; Sabina Garatova; Aynur Jabbarli; Aysha Mustafayeva; Siyana Vasileva; Lala Yusifova

== Results ==
=== Seniors ===
==== Team ====
Rank	Nation	Hoop (rhythmic gymnastics)	Ball (rhythmic gymnastics)	Clubs (rhythmic gymnastics)	Ribbon (rhythmic gymnastics)	Total
1st place, gold medalist(s)	Russia	58.125	58.200	57.800	56.675	230.800
2nd place, silver medalist(s)	Belarus	55.600	56.550	55.275	55.700	223.125
3rd place, bronze medalist(s)	Ukraine	53.300	53.600	54.000	53.300	214.200
4	Azerbaijan	52.650	53.425	52.450	52.525	211.050
5	Israel	53.350	51.850	53.225	52.550	210.975
6	Austria	52.050	52.025	52.350	52.775	209.200
7	Bulgaria	52.450	52.800	51.550	52.100	208.900
8	Poland	50.900	52.650	51.850	51.350	206.750
9	Italy	50.800	51.125	52.575	51.950	206.450
10	Spain	51.325	52.000	50.825	50.850	205.000
11	Germany	52.225	52.200	50.725	48.750	203.900
12	Greece	49.825	50.275	49.600	50.500	200.200
13	Romania	49.700	49.350	50.000	50.525	199.575
14	Estonia	50.000	48.475	47.350	49.075	194.900
15	Hungary	49.250	49.425	48.375	47.125	194.175
16	Czech Republic	49.250	45.650	47.975	47.525	190.400
17	Latvia	48.050	48.250	47.425	46.475	190.200
18	Turkey	47.425	48.625	47.175	46.075	189.300
19	Moldova	46.375	46.225	47.825	46.950	187.375
20	Slovenia	47.350	43.950	46.600	47.175	185.075
21	Great Britain	44.575	46.100	45.350	44.950	180.975
22	Slovakia	46.475	43.900	43.150	45.900	179.425
23	Lithuania	44.475	44.975	42.550	44.825	176.825
24	Armenia	44.075	39.150	46.150	44.475	173.850
25	Sweden	49.250	46.250	48.275	23.000	166.775
26	San Marino	36.250	38.350	39.275	37.450	151.325
27	Finland	49.050	45.175	23.550	22.200	139.975

==== Hoop ====
Final was held on Sunday, 29 May 2011 at 13:30 local time.

Rank	Gymnast	Nation	D Score	A Score	E Score	Pen.	Total
1st place, gold medalist(s)	Evgenia Kanaeva	Russia	9.850	9.900	9.700		29.450
2nd place, silver medalist(s)	Daria Kondakova	Russia	9.675	9.750	9.600		29.025
3rd place, bronze medalist(s)	Liubou Charkashyna	Belarus	9.200	9.550	9.450		28.200
4	Aliya Garayeva	Azerbaijan	8.925	9.500	9.300		27.725
5	Silviya Miteva	Bulgaria	9.050	9.300	9.250		27.600
6	Alina Maksymenko	Ukraine	8.850	9.400	9.250		27.500
7	Neta Rivkin	Israel	8.625	9.400	9.200		27.225
8	Delphine Ledoux	France	8.500	9.150	9.200		26.850

==== Ball ====
Final was held on Sunday, 29 May 2011 at 14:02 local time.

Rank	Gymnast	Nation	D Score	A Score	E Score	Pen.	Total
1st place, gold medalist(s)	Liubou Charkashyna	Belarus	9.350	9.550	9.550		28.450
2nd place, silver medalist(s)	Evgenia Kanaeva	Russia	9.550	9.600	9.300	0.10	28.350
3rd place, bronze medalist(s)	Daria Dmitrieva	Russia	8.825	9.400	9.250		27.575
4	Aliya Garayeva	Azerbaijan	8.550	9.550	9.400		27.500
5	Neta Rivkin	Israel	8.950	9.300	9.250		27.500
6	Silviya Miteva	Bulgaria	8.750	9.450	9.200		27.400
7	Joanna Mitrosz	Poland	8.750	9.200	9.200		27.150
8	Melitina Staniouta	Belarus	8.350	9.300	8.900		26.550

==== Clubs ====
Final was held on Sunday, 29 May 2011 at 14:34 local time.

Rank	Gymnast	Nation	D Score	A Score	E Score	Pen.	Total
1st place, gold medalist(s)	Liubou Charkashyna	Belarus	9.300	9.600	9.400		28.300
2nd place, silver medalist(s)	Neta Rivkin	Israel	9.150	9.400	9.400	0.05	27.900
3rd place, bronze medalist(s)	Alina Maksymenko	Ukraine	9.025	9.350	9.150		27.575
4	Daria Kondakova	Russia	9.100	9.200	9.200		27.500
5	Silviya Miteva	Bulgaria	8.675	9.450	9.250		27.375
6	Yevgeniya Kanayeva	Russia	9.050	9.350	9.200	0.40	27.200
7	Joanna Mitrosz	Poland	8.875	9.100	9.100		27.075
8	Delphine Ledoux	France	8.400	9.150	9.000		26.550

==== Ribbon ====
Final was held on Sunday, 29 May 2011 at 15:06 local time.

Rank	Gymnast	Nation	D Score	A Score	E Score	Pen.	Total
1st place, gold medalist(s)	Evgenia Kanaeva	Russia	9.775	9.800	9.700		29.275
2nd place, silver medalist(s)	Daria Kondakova	Russia	9.775	9.700	9.650	0.05	29.075
3rd place, bronze medalist(s)	Silviya Miteva	Bulgaria	8.775	9.550	9.500		27.825
4	Liubov Charkashyna	Belarus	8.900	9.550	9.500	0.20	27.750
5	Hanna Rabtsava	Belarus	8.750	9.400	9.450		27.600
6	Joanna Mitrosz	Poland	8.900	9.100	9.050	0.05	27.000
7	Neta Rivkin	Israel	8.375	9.300	9.300		26.975
8	Caroline Weber	Austria	8.600	8.900	8.900		26.400

=== Juniors ===
==== Group All-around ====
The final was held on Sunday 28 May 2011 at 10:00 local time.

Rank	Nation	Rope (rhythmic gymnastics)	Rope (rhythmic gymnastics)	Total
1st place, gold medalist(s)	Belarus	26.100	26.150	52.250
2nd place, silver medalist(s)	Russia	25.300	26.900	52.200
3rd place, bronze medalist(s)	Israel	25.550	25.650	51.200
4	Azerbaijan	24.900	25.850	50.750
5	Bulgaria	24.700	25.675	50.375
6	Italy	24.450	24.450	48.900
7	Switzerland	24.475	24.350	48.825
8	Finland	23.675	24.150	47.825
9	Hungary	23.925	23.150	47.075
10	Ukraine	23.275	23.450	46.725
11	Spain	22.850	23.650	46.500
12	Estonia	23.000	23.450	46.450
13	Germany	22.850	23.600	46.450
14	Latvia	22.775	23.100	45.875
15	Portugal	22.025	23.200	45.225
16	United Kingdom	22.350	22.850	45.200
17	Poland	23.050	21.250	44.300
18	Serbia	22.075	21.750	43.825
19	Austria	22.000	21.750	43.750
20	Lithuania	21.500	21.950	43.450
21	Norway	21.850	21.400	43.250
22	Croatia	22.050	20.350	42.400
23	Slovakia	21.000	21.200	42.200

==== Group: 5 ropes ====
The final was held on Sunday 29 May 2011 at 11:00 local time.

Rank	Nation	D Score	A Score	E Score	Pen.	Total
1st place, gold medalist(s)	Russia	8.350	9.450	9.300		27.100
2nd place, silver medalist(s)	Belarus	8.000	9.400	9.100		26.500
3rd place, bronze medalist(s)	Azerbaijan	7.475	9.400	8.950		25.825
4	Bulgaria	7.400	9.250	8.550	0.20	25.000
5	Israel	7.700	9.100	8.450	0.40	24.850
6	Switzerland	7.450	8.800	8.400		24.650
7	Italy	7.300	8.700	8.550		24.550
8	Finland	7.100	8.600	8.250		23.950

== Medal count ==
=== Seniors ===
Rank	Nation	Gold	Silver	Bronze	Total
1	Russia	3	3	1	7
2	Belarus	2	1	1	4
3	Israel	0	1	0	1
4	Ukraine	0	0	2	2
5	Bulgaria	0	0	1	1
Totals (5 entries)		5	5	5	15

=== Juniors ===
Rank	Nation	Gold	Silver	Bronze	Total
1	Belarus	1	1	0	2
1	Russia	1	1	0	2
3	Azerbaijan	0	0	1	1
3	Israel	0	0	1	1
Totals (4 entries)		2	2	2	6
