= Lee Kyung-eun =

South Korean rhythmic gymnast

Lee Kyung Eun
- Born: 14 February 1992 (age 34)

Gymnastics career
- Discipline: Rhythmic gymnastics
- Country represented: South Korea; (2015)

Lee Kyung Eun (Korean: 이경은, born 14 February 1992) is a South Korean group rhythmic gymnast. She represents her nation at international competitions. She competed at world championships, including at the 2015 World Rhythmic Gymnastics Championships.
