= Maryia Katsiak =

Belarusian rhythmic gymnast (born 1997)

- Full name: Maryia Katsiak
- Born: 2 March 1997 (age 29)
- Height: 1.67 m (5 ft 6 in)

Gymnastics career
- Discipline: Rhythmic gymnastics
- Country represented: Belarus (2015)
- Club: Dinamo Minsk
- Head coach: Tatiana Nenasheva
- Assistant coach: Katsiaryna Bialiauskaya
- Choreographer: Volha Strakhava
Medal record
Representing Belarus
Group rhythmic gymnastics
World Championships
Gold medal – first place	2013 Kyiv	Group all-around
Silver medal – second place	2013 Kyiv	3 Balls + 2 Ribbons
European Championships
Gold medal – first place	2016 Holon	5 Ribbons
Silver medal – second place	2016 Holon	Group all-around
Junior European Championships
Gold medal – first place	2011 Minsk	Group All-around
Silver medal – second place	2011 Minsk	5 Ropes

Maryia Vasilyeuna Katsiak (Belarusian: Марыя Васільеўна Кацяк, Russian: Мария Васильевна Котяк; born 2 March 1997) is a Belarusian female rhythmic gymnast. Katsiak won a silver medal as a member of the national squad at the 2016 European Championships in Holon, Israel, and eventually competed alongside her teammates Maria Kadobina, Hanna Dudzenkova, Valeriya Pischelina, and Arina Tsitsilina at the 2016 Summer Olympics in Rio de Janeiro, finishing outside of medals in the group all-around final with a fifth-place score of 35.299.
