= Sofia Lodi =

Italian rhythmic gymnast (born 1998)

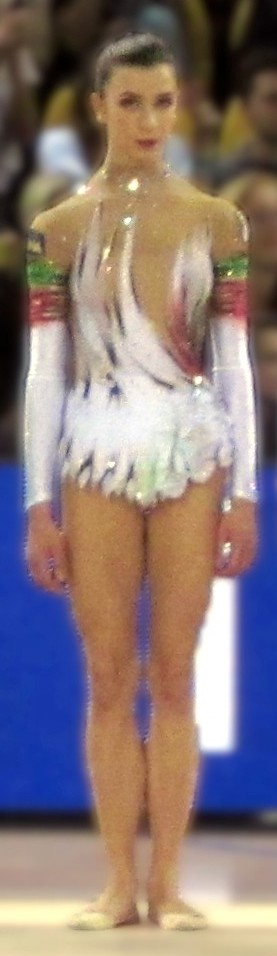

Personal information
- Full name: Sofia Lodi
- Born: 29 January 1998 (age 28) Brescia, Italy
- Height: 1.75 m (5 ft 9 in)

Gymnastics career
- Discipline: Rhythmic gymnastics
- Country represented: Italy; (2015)
- Club: Brixia Brescia
- Head coach: Emanuela Maccarani
- Choreographer: Gjergj Bodari
Medal record
Representing Italy
Group Rhythmic Gymnastics
World Championships
Gold medal – first place	2015 Stuttgart	5 Ribbons
Silver medal – second place	2015 Stuttgart	6 Clubs + 2 Hoops
Silver medal – second place	2014 Izmir	Group All-around
European Championships
Silver medal – second place	2014 Baku	Group All-around

Sofia Lodi (born 29 January 1998) is an Italian female rhythmic gymnast. A member of the national squad since 2015, Centofanti ascended to prominence on the international scene at the 2016 Summer Olympics, where she and fellow rhythmic gymnasts Martina Centofanti, Camilla Patriarca, Marta Pagnini, and Alessia Maurelli attained a total score of 35.549 on the combination of hoops, ribbons, and clubs for the fourth spot in the final, slipping her team off the podium by nearly two tenths of a point.

== Detailed Olympic results ==
Year	Competition Description	Location	Music	Apparatus	Rank	Score-Final	Rank	Score-Qualifying
2016	Olympics	Rio de Janeiro		All-around	4th	35.549	4th	35.349
2016	Olympics	Rio de Janeiro	Tu Si Na Cosa Grande, Tammurriata, Nessun Dorma by Massimo Ranieri, Unknown, Luciano Pavarotti	5 Ribbons	4th	17.516	5th	17.516
2016	Olympics	Rio de Janeiro	Faust: VII. Danse de Phryne. Allegretto vivo Herbert von Karajan	6 Clubs / 2 Hoops	3rd	18.033	3rd	17.833
