= Marta Pagnini =

Italian rhythmic gymnast (born 1991)

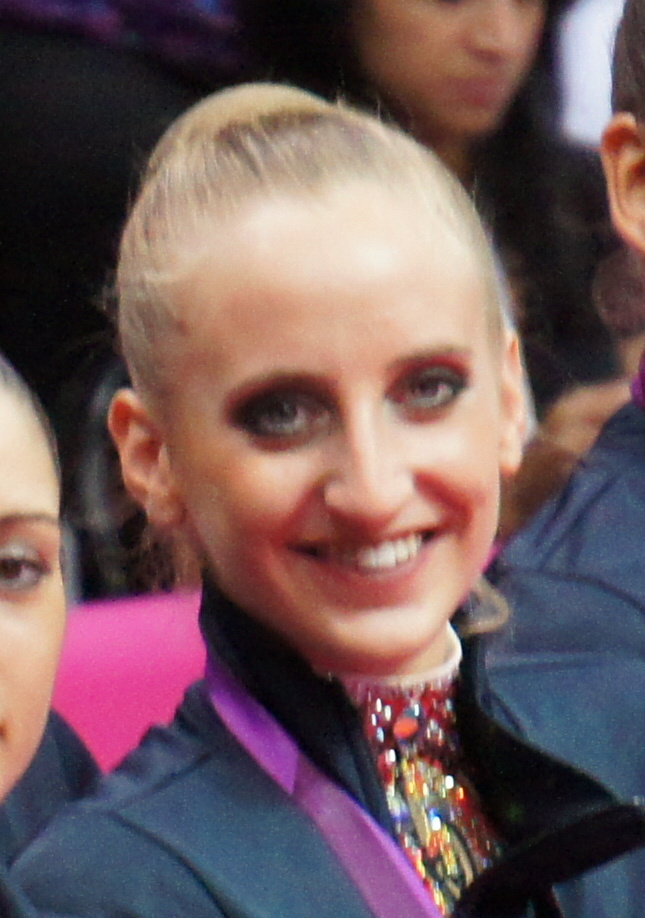

Personal information
- Born: 21 January 1991 (age 35) Florence, Italy
- Height: 175 cm (5 ft 9 in)

Gymnastics career
- Discipline: Rhythmic gymnastics
- Country represented: Italy (2011-2016)
- Club: Aeronautica Militare
- Head coach: Emanuela Maccarani
- Retired: Yes
Medal record
Group Rhythmic Gymnastics
Representing Italy
Olympic Games
Bronze medal – third place	2012 London	Group All-around
World Championships
Gold medal – first place	2011 Montpellier	Group All-around
Gold medal – first place	2015 Stuttgart	5 Ribbons
Silver medal – second place	2011 Montpellier	5 Balls
Silver medal – second place	2011 Montpellier	3 Ribbons/ 2 Hoops
Silver medal – second place	2013 Kyiv	Group All-around
Silver medal – second place	2013 Kyiv	10 Clubs
Silver medal – second place	2014 Izmir	Group All-around
Silver medal – second place	2015 Stuttgart	6 Clubs/ 2 Hoops
European Championships
Silver medal – second place	2014 Baku	Group All-around
Bronze medal – third place	2012 N.Novgorod	Group All-around
Bronze medal – third place	2012 N.Novgorod	3 Ribbons/ 2 Hoops

Marta Pagnini (born 21 January 1991) is a retired Italian group rhythmic gymnast from Prato, Italy.

== Early life ==
Pagnini trained in ballet between the ages of 6 and 8. She then trained in artistic gymnastics before switching to rhythmic at the advice of her coaches.

== Career ==
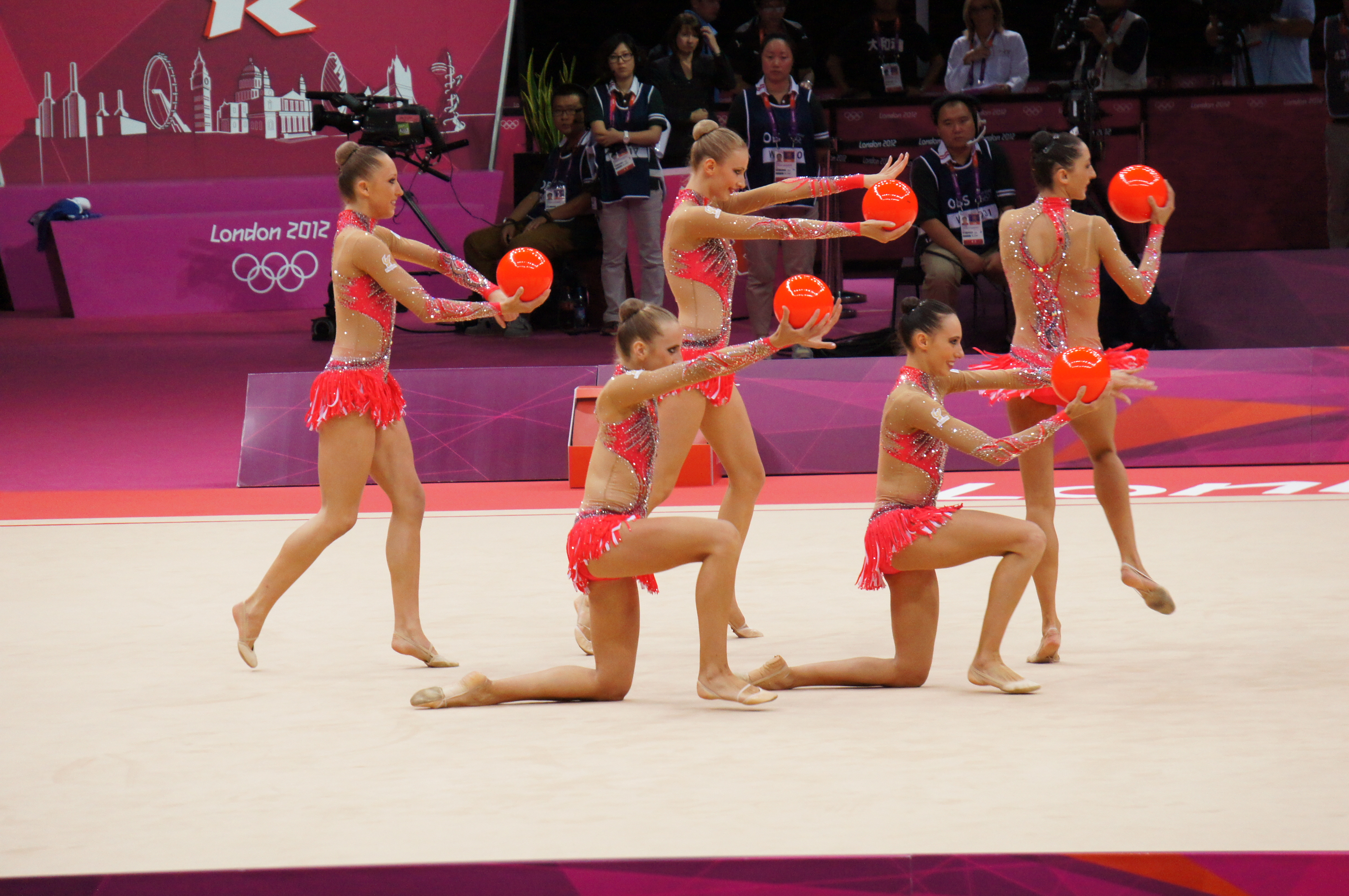
Italian Group in 5 Balls at the 2012 Summer Olympics

She was part of the 2010 and 2011 Italian Group that competed at the World Championships that won the Group All-around gold medal. Her teammates also won a pair of bronze medals at the 2012 World Cup Final in 5 Balls and 3 Ribbons + 2 Hoops. She has won a bronze medal at the 2012 Summer Olympics in the group all-around event together with other Group Members( Elisa Blanchi, Romina Laurito, Elisa Santoni, Anzhelika Savrayuk, Andreea Stefanescu ). In 2013, with the retirement of Elisa Santoni, Pagnini became the captain of the Italian National Rhythmic Gymnastics Team that was dubbed "Le Leonesse". In 2013, Pagnini was part of the team that took an all around silver and won a silver in 10 Clubs event in World Rhythmic Gymnastics Championships in Kyiv. In 2014, Pagnini was part of the team that took an all around silver in World Rhythmic Gymnastics Championships in Izmir. With her team, she competed at the 2015 European Games in Baku and finished 7th in all around group finals, 5th in 5 Ribbons event and 6th in 3 Clubs+2 Hoops event. In 2015, she and her team mates took gold in 5 Ribbons final at the 2015 World Rhythmic Gymnastics Championships in Stuttgart. She was the captain of the Italian National Rhythmic Gymnastics Team that competed at the 2016 Summer Olympics in the group all-around event. Pagnini and her team mates, Martina Centofanti, Sofia Lodi, Alessia Maurelli and Camilla Patriarca placed 4th with an overall score of 35,549 behind Bulgaria. She is fluent in Russian and English and serves in the Italian Air Force as aviere capo

== Detailed Olympic results ==
Year	Competition Description	Location	Music	Apparatus	Rank	Score-Final	Rank	Score-Qualifying
2016	Olympics	Rio de Janeiro		All-around	4th	35.549	4th	35.349
2016	Olympics	Rio de Janeiro	Tu Si Na Cosa Grande, Tammurriata, Nessun Dorma by Massimo Ranieri, Unknown, Luciano Pavarotti	5 Ribbons	4th	17.516	5th	17.516
2016	Olympics	Rio de Janeiro	Faust: VII. Danse de Phryne. Allegretto vivo Herbert von Karajan	6 Clubs / 2 Hoops	3rd	18.033	3rd	17.833

Year	Competition Description	Location	Music	Apparatus	Rank	Score-Final	Rank	Score-Qualifying
2012	Olympics	London		All-around	3rd	55.450	2nd	55.800
2012	Olympics	London	Black Gold by Armand Amar	5 Balls	2nd	28.125	2nd	28.100
2012	Olympics	London	William Tell Overture by Gioachino Rossini	3 Ribbons + 2 Hoops	4th	27.325	2nd	27.700
