= Camilla Patriarca =

Italian rhythmic gymnast (born 1994)

- Full name: Camilla Patriarca
- Born: 4 November 1994 (age 31) Sondrio, Italy
- Height: 1.70 m (5 ft 7 in)

Gymnastics career
- Discipline: Rhythmic gymnastics
- Country represented: Italy (2014-2016)
- Club: Aeronautica Militare
- Head coach: Emanuela Maccarani
- Choreographer: Gjergj Bodari
Medal record
Representing Italy
Group Rhythmic Gymnastics
World Championships
Gold medal – first place	2015 Stuttgart	5 Ribbons
Silver medal – second place	2015 Stuttgart	6 Clubs + 2 Hoops
Silver medal – second place	2014 Izmir	Group All-around
European Championships
Silver medal – second place	2014 Baku	Group All-around

Camilla Patriarca (born 4 November 1994) is a retired Italian rhythmic gymnast.

A member of the national squad from 2014 to 2016, Patriarca ascended to prominence on the international scene at the 2016 Summer Olympics, where she and fellow rhythmic gymnasts Sofia Lodi, Martina Centofanti, Marta Pagnini, and Alessia Maurelli attained a total score of 35.549 on the combination of hoops, ribbons, and clubs for the fourth spot in the final, slipping her team off the podium by nearly two tenths of a point.

== Personal life ==
In 2024, Camilla graduated from Sport Science at Università Cattolica del Sacro Cuore in Milan. From 2020 to 2022 she worked as an assistant coach for Italian national group. In 2025, she moved to Germany to work as a coach for national senior group.

== Career ==
In January 2014 she was recognized by Emanuela Maccarani, who invited her to be part of the National Rhythmic Gymnastics team of Italy. She then moved to Desio and made her international debut at the 2014 European Championships in Baku, Azerbaijan, where she and her team took silver medal in Group All-around competition. They also won bronze medal in Group All-around and 3 + 2 Final at the 2014 World Cup Sofia. On September 21–28, she competed at the 2014 World Championships, her first one, which took place in İzmir, Turkey. Her team took silver medal in Group All-around, less than 0.2 point away from gold, was won by Bulgaria. In finals, they placed 5th with 10 Clubs and 4th with 3 Balls + 2 Ribbons.

In 2015, she and her team mates took gold in 5 Ribbons final at the 2015 World Championships in Stuttgart, Germany.

She and her team mates, Martina Centofanti, Sofia Lodi, Marta Pagnini and Alessia Maurelli placed 4th in Group All-around at the 2016 Summer Olympics. After the event, she retired from competitive sport.

== Detailed Olympic results ==
Year	Competition Description	Location	Music	Apparatus	Rank	Score-Final	Rank	Score-Qualifying
2016	Olympics	Rio de Janeiro		All-around	4th	35.549	4th	35.349
2016	Olympics	Rio de Janeiro	Tu Si Na Cosa Grande, Tammurriata, Nessun Dorma by Massimo Ranieri, Unknown, Luciano Pavarotti	5 Ribbons	4th	17.516	5th	17.516
2016	Olympics	Rio de Janeiro	Faust: VII. Danse de Phryne. Allegretto vivo Herbert von Karajan	6 Clubs / 2 Hoops	3rd	18.033	3rd	17.833
