= Veronica Bertolini =

Italian rhythmic gymnast

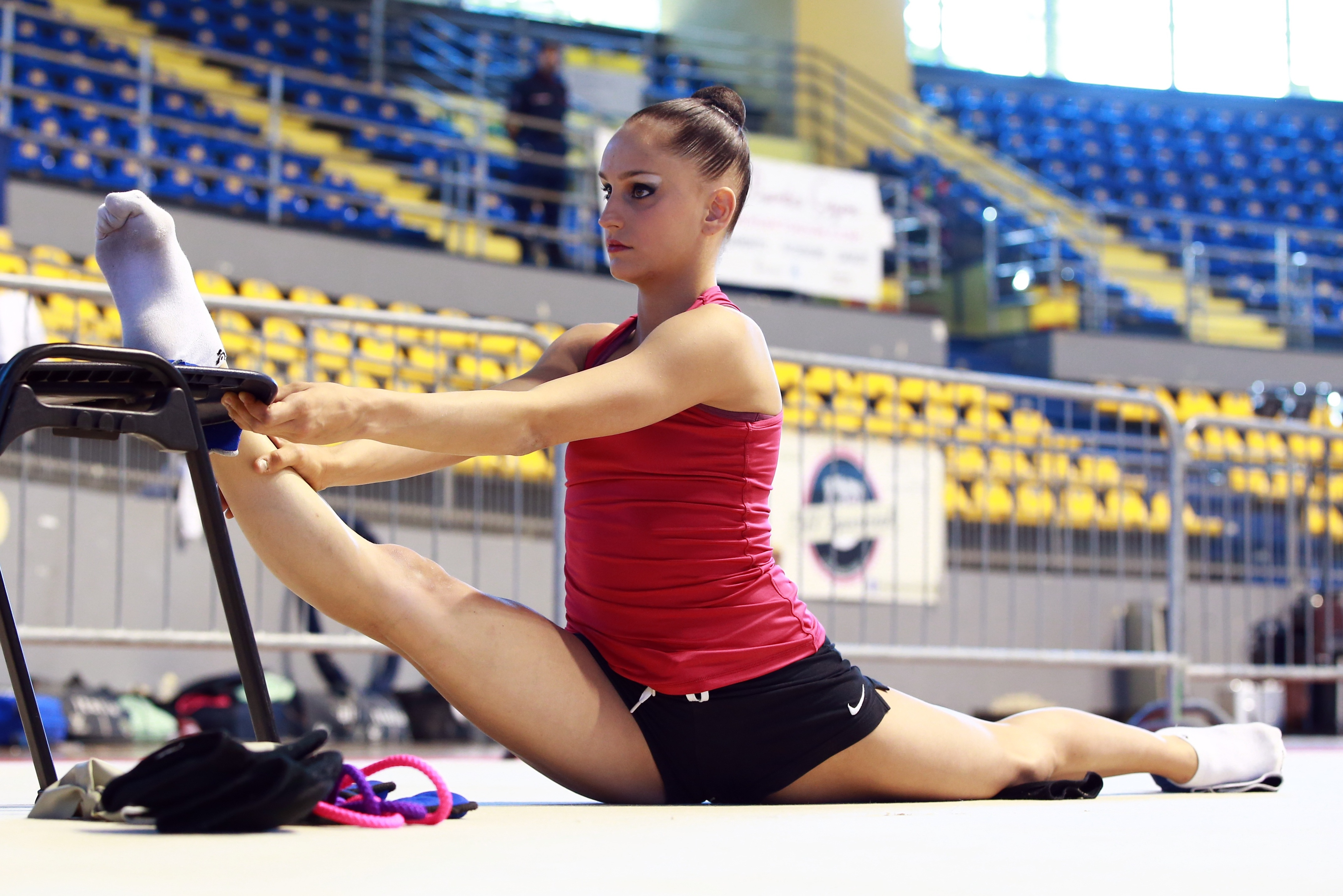

Personal information
- Nickname: Vero
- Born: 19 October 1995 (age 31) Sondrio, Italy
- Height: 167 cm (5 ft 6 in)

Gymnastics career
- Discipline: Rhythmic gymnastics
- Country represented: Italy; (2010-2017)
- College team: Telematic University
- Club: ASD San Giorgio '79
- Head coach: Elena Aliprandi
- Retired: yes
- World ranking: 11 (2016 Season); 35 (2015 Season); 35 (2015 Season)

Veronica Bertolini (born 19 October 1995) is an Italian individual rhythmic gymnast. She is the five-time (2013-2017) Italian National all-around champion.

== Biography ==
Born in Sondrio, Italy, Bertolini started practicing rhythmic gymnastics in 2003 at 8 years of age.

=== Career ===
In 2009, Bertolini moved to Desio, Italy at the sports club ASD San Giorgio '79. In 2010, Bertolini became a member of the Italian National team and competed at the 2010 European Junior Championships in Bremen, Germany. She qualified to ball final, finishing in 6th place.

Bertolini debuted as a senior in the 2011 Season and has competed in the World Cup series and Grand Prix series. In 2013, Bertolini participated at the 2013 European Championships in Vienna, Austria. She finished 28th in the all-around qualifications at the 2013 World Championships in Kyiv and did not advance to the Top 24 finalists.

In 2014, Bertolini was invited for a monthlong technical training in Russia's famous Novogorsk Sport center for rhythmic gymnastics. She had her highest placement finishing 22nd in the all-around finals at the 2014 World Championships in İzmir.

In 2015, Bertolini started her season at the Moscow Grand Prix finishing in 15th in all-around. She competed at the Lisbon World Cup finishing 19th in all-around and 26th position at the Pesaro World Cup. At the 2015 Summer Universiade in Gwangju, South Korea, she finished 10th in the all-around. She competed at the 2015 World Cup Final in Kazan, finishing 28th in the all-around. At the 2015 World Championships in Stuttgart, Bertolini qualified for her second all-around finals finishing in 23rd position and with Team Italy placing 14th in the overall standings. She finished 8th in the all-around at the 2015 Aeon Cup behind Austria's Nicol Ruprecht.

In 2016, Bertolini competed at the 2016 Espoo World Cup finishing 12th in the all-around with a total of 68.850 points. On 17–20 March she then competed at the 2016 Lisbon World Cup where she finished 9th in the all-around ahead of Kazakh Sabina Ashirbayeva. On 1–3 April she competed at the 2016 Pesaro World Cup where she finished 8th in the all-around (a PB: 70.900) and qualified to clubs final. On 21–22 April Bertolini won an Olympics license by finishing third amongst a top 8 selection of highest score for non qualified gymnasts at the 2016 Gymnastics Olympic Test Event held in Rio de Janeiro. On 27–29 May Bertolini then finished 11th in the all-around at the 2016 Sofia World Cup with a total of 69.000 points. On 17–19 June Bertolini then competed at the 2016 European Championships where she finished in 12th place. On 8–10 July Bertolini then finished 9th in the all-around at the 2016 Kazan World Cup with a total of 71.500. On 22–24 July, culminating the World Cup of the season in 2016 Baku World Cup, Bertolini finished 5th in the all-around with a total of 72.600 points - a New Personal Best, she qualified to all apparatus finals placing 4th in hoop, 5th in ball, 4th in clubs and 8th in ribbon.

On 19–20 August Bertolini competed at the 2016 Summer Olympics held in Rio de Janeiro, Brazil. She finished 19th in the rhythmic gymnastics individual all-around qualifications and did not advance into the top 10 finals.

In the 2017 season, on 7–9 April Bertolini competed at the 2017 Pesaro World Cup finishing 11th in the all-around. She retained as the Italian National All-around champion. Bertolini competed at the quadrennial held 2017 World Games in Wrocław, Poland from 20 to 30 July, however she did not advance to any of the apparatus finals. On 11–13 August Bertolini competed at the 2017 Kazan World Challenge Cup finishing 16th in the all-around.

== Routine music information ==
Year	Apparatus	Music title
2017	Hoop	Una Notte Sul Monte Calvo by Festival Symphony Orchestra
2017	Ball	?
2017	Clubs	Romani Holiday (Antonius Remix) by Hans Zimmer
2017	Ribbon	Il ballo di San Vito by Vinicio Capossela
2016	Hoop	Je Suis Malade by Lara Fabian
2016	Ball	Qué Viyéra music from Totem by Cirque du Soleil
2016	Clubs	Romani Holiday (Antonius Remix) by Hans Zimmer
2016	Ribbon	Hunger music from Black Hawk Down by Hans Zimmer
2015	Hoop	Je Suis Malade by Lara Fabian
2015	Ball	Qué Viyéra music from Totem by Cirque du Soleil
2015	Clubs	Romani Holiday (Antonius Remix) by Hans Zimmer
2015	Ribbon	Hunger music from Black Hawk Down by Hans Zimmer
2014	Hoop	?
2014	Ball	Qué Viyéra music from Totem by Cirque du Soleil
2014	Clubs	Romani Holiday (Antonius Remix) by Hans Zimmer
2014	Ribbon	"Wipe Out" by The Surfaris, Fat Boys & The Beach Boys, Gary Hoey
2013	Hoop	We Will Rock You by Queen, VonLichten
2013	Ball	Feeling good / Guarda che luna by Muse / Roberto Romagnoli
2013	Clubs	?
2013	Ribbon	"Wipe Out" by The Surfaris, Fat Boys & The Beach Boys, Gary Hoey
2012	Hoop	?
2012	Ball	Feeling good / Guarda che luna by Muse / Roberto Romagnoli
2012	Clubs	24000 baci by Hans Zimmer
2012	Ribbon	Il Sultano di Babilonia e la prostituta by Angelo Branduardi
2011	Hoop	Je Suis Malade Piano Version -(remix)
2011	Ball	?
2011	Clubs	24000 baci by Hans Zimmer
2011	Ribbon	Il Sultano di Babilonia e la prostituta by Angelo Branduardi
