= Gymnastics at the 2015 Pan American Games – Women's rhythmic group 6 clubs + 2 hoops =

Women's rhythmic group 6 clubs + 2 hoops at the 2015 Pan American Games
- Venue: Toronto Coliseum
- Dates: July 20
- Competitors: 30 from 5 nations
- Winning score: 14.983

Medalists
| Gold medal | Kiana Eide; Alisa Kano; Natalie McGiffert; Jennifer Rokhman; Monica Rokhman; Kristen Shaldybin | United States |
| Silver medal | Dayane Amaral; Morgana Gmach; Emanuelle Lima; Jessica Maier; Ana Paula Ribeiro; Beatriz Pomini | Brazil |
| Bronze medal | Katrina Cameron; Maya Kojevnikov; Lucinda Nowell; Vanessa Panov; Anjelika Reznik; Victoria Reznik | Canada |

The women's rhythmic group 6 clubs + 2 hoops gymnastic event at the 2015 Pan American Games was held on July 20 at the Toronto Coliseum.

== Schedule ==
All times are Eastern Daylight Time (UTC-4).

| Date | Time | Round |
|---|---|---|
| July 20, 2015 | 11:50 | Finals |

== Results ==
| Position | Gymnasts | Difficulty | Execution | Penalty | Total |
|---|---|---|---|---|---|
| 1st place, gold medalist(s) | United States; Kiana Eide; Alisa Kano; Natalie McGiffert; Jennifer Rokhman; Monica Rokhman; Kristen Shaldybin | 7.450 | 7.533 | | 14.983 |
| 2nd place, silver medalist(s) | Brazil; Dayane Amaral; Morgana Gmach; Emanuelle Lima; Jessica Maier; Ana Paula Ribeiro; Beatriz Pomini | 7.425 | 7.267 | | 14.692 |
| 3rd place, bronze medalist(s) | Canada; Katrina Cameron; Maya Kojevnikov; Lucinda Nowell; Vanessa Panov; Anjelika Reznik; Victoria Reznik | 6.825 | 6.884 | | 13.709 |
| 4 | Mexico; Diana Casillas; Luz Morales; Maria Nava; Erandeni Nava; Marialicia Ortega; Pamela Reynolds | 6.925 | 6.333 | | 13.258 |
| 5 | Cuba; Claudia Arjona; Zenia Fernandez; Melissa Kindelan; Martha Perez; Adriana Ramirez; Legna Savon | 6.400 | 6.425 | | 12.825 |
