= Gymnastics at the 2015 Pan American Games – Women's rhythmic group 5 ribbons =

Women's rhythmic group 5 ribbons at the 2015 Pan American Games
- Venue: Toronto Coliseum
- Dates: July 19
- Competitors: 30 from 5 nations
- Winning score: 15.000

Medalists
Gold medal	Dayane Amaral; Morgana Gmach; Emanuelle Lima; Jessica Maier; Ana Paula Ribeiro; Beatriz Pomini	Brazil
Silver medal	Kiana Eide; Alisa Kano; Natalie McGiffert; Jennifer Rokhman; Monica Rokhman; Kristen Shaldybin	United States
Bronze medal	Katrina Cameron; Maya Kojevnikov; Lucinda Nowell; Vanessa Panov; Anjelika Reznik; Victoria Reznik	Canada

The women's rhythmic group 5 ribbons gymnastic event at the 2015 Pan American Games was held on July 19 at the Toronto Coliseum.

== Schedule ==
All times are Eastern Daylight Time (UTC-4).

Date	Time	Round
July 19, 2015	11:50	Finals

== Results ==
Position	Gymnasts	Difficulty	Execution	Penalty	Total
1st place, gold medalist(s)	Brazil; Dayane Amaral; Morgana Gmach; Emanuelle Lima; Jessica Maier; Ana Paula Ribeiro; Beatriz Pomini	7.500	7.500		15.000
2nd place, silver medalist(s)	United States; Kiana Eide; Alisa Kano; Natalie McGiffert; Jennifer Rokhman; Monica Rokhman; Kristen Shaldybin	6.950	6.333		13.283
3rd place, bronze medalist(s)	Canada; Katrina Cameron; Maya Kojevnikov; Lucinda Nowell; Vanessa Panov; Anjelika Reznik; Victoria Reznik	6.450	6.367		12.817
4	Cuba; Claudia Arjona; Zenia Fernandez; Melissa Kindelan; Martha Perez; Adriana Ramirez; Legna Savon	6.100	5.800		11.900
5	Mexico; Diana Casillas; Luz Morales; Maria Nava; Erandeni Nava; Marialicia Ortega; Pamela Reynolds	5.350	4.733		10.083
