= Gymnastics at the 2015 Pan American Games – Women's rhythmic group all-around =

Women's rhythmic group all-around at the 2015 Pan American Games
- Venue: Toronto Coliseum
- Dates: July 17–18
- Competitors: 30 from 5 nations
- Winning score: 30.233

Medalists
Gold medal	Dayane Amaral; Morgana Gmach; Emanuelle Lima; Jessica Maier; Ana Paula Ribeiro; Beatriz Pomini	Brazil
Silver medal	Kiana Eide; Alisa Kano; Natalie McGiffert; Jennifer Rokhman; Monica Rokhman; Kristen Shaldybin	United States
Bronze medal	Claudia Arjona; Zenia Fernandez; Melissa Kindelan; Martha Perez; Adriana Ramirez; Legna Savon	Cuba

The women's rhythmic group all-around gymnastic event at the 2015 Pan American Games was held on July 17–18 at the Toronto Coliseum.

== Schedule ==
All times are Eastern Daylight Time (UTC-4).

Date	Time	Round
July 17, 2015	13:05	Final Rotation 1
July 18, 2015	13:05	Final Rotation 2

== Results ==
Position	Gymnast	5 Ribbons	6 Clubs, 2 Hoops	Total
1st place, gold medalist(s)	Brazil; Dayane Amaral; Morgana Gmach; Emanuelle Lima; Jessica Maier; Ana Paula Ribeiro; Beatriz Pomini	14.800 (1)	15.433 (1)	30.233
2nd place, silver medalist(s)	United States; Kiana Eide; Alisa Kano; Natalie McGiffert; Jennifer Rokhman; Monica Rokhman; Kristen Shaldybin	14.600 (2)	14.675 (2)	29.275
3rd place, bronze medalist(s)	Cuba; Claudia Arjona; Zenia Fernandez; Melissa Kindelan; Martha Perez; Adriana Ramirez; Legna Savon	13.492 (3)	12.200 (5)	25.692
4	Mexico; Diana Casillas; Luz Morales; Maria Nava; Erandeni Nava; Marialicia Ortega; Pamela Reynolds	12.067 (4)	12.242 (4)	24.309
5	Canada; Katrina Cameron; Maya Kojevnikov; Lucinda Nowell; Vanessa Panov; Anjelika Reznik; Victoria Reznik	10.117 (5)	13.333 (3)	23.450
