= Gymnastics at the 2015 Pan American Games =

- Gymnastics pictograms
- Venue: Toronto Coliseum
- Start date: July 11, 2015
- End date: July 20, 2015
- No. of events: 24 (9 men, 15 women)
- Competitors: 176 from 24 nations

Gymnastics competitions at the 2015 Pan American Games in Toronto were held from 11 to 20 July at the Ricoh Coliseum; due to naming rights the venue was known as the Toronto Coliseum for the duration of the games. The competition was split into three disciplines, artistic, rhythmic and trampoline. Women competed in all three disciplines whereas the men only took part in the artistic and trampoline competitions.

== Competition venue ==
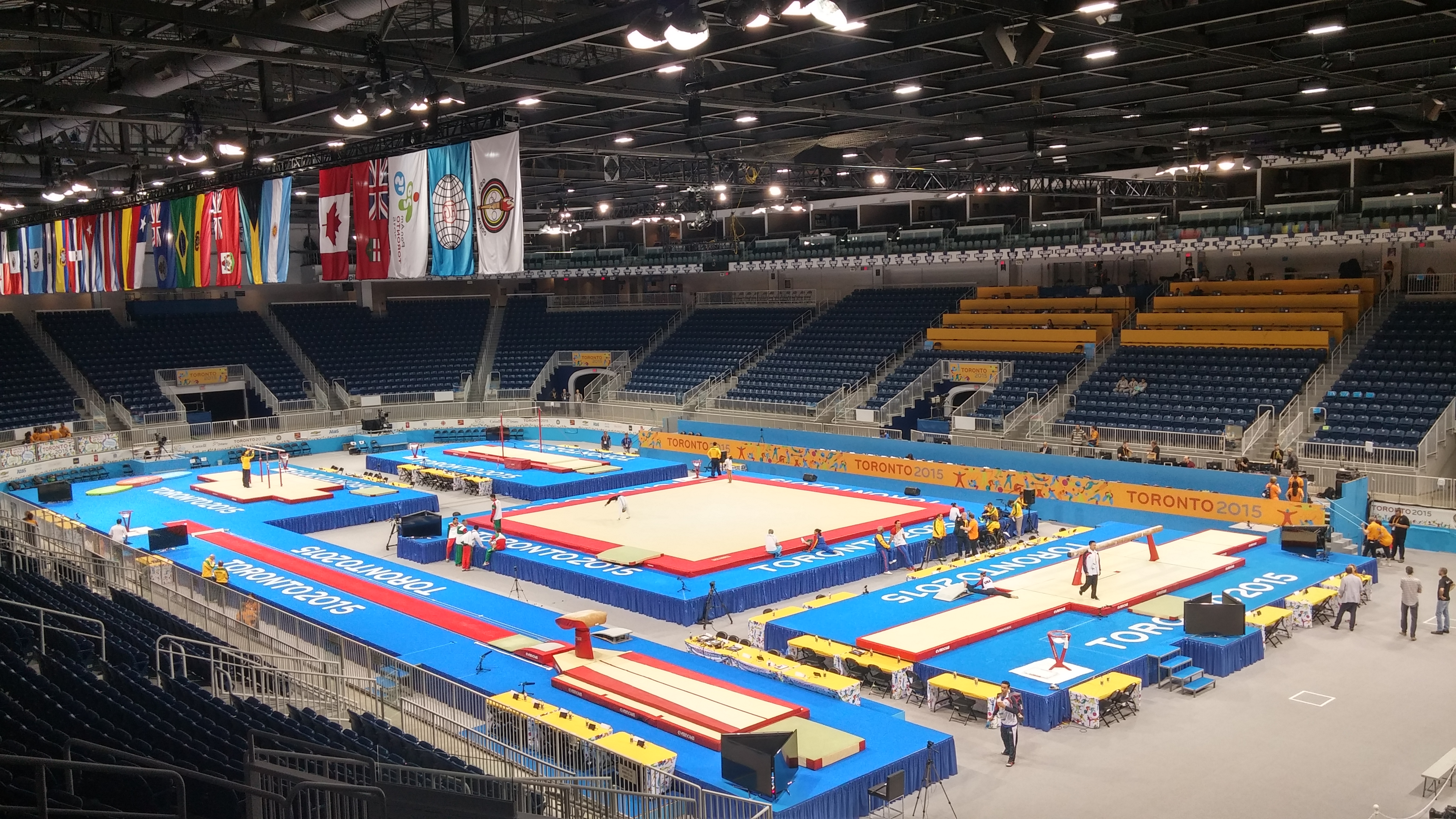
The Ricoh Coliseum (Toronto Coliseum), in Toronto, was the venue for the gymnastics competitions

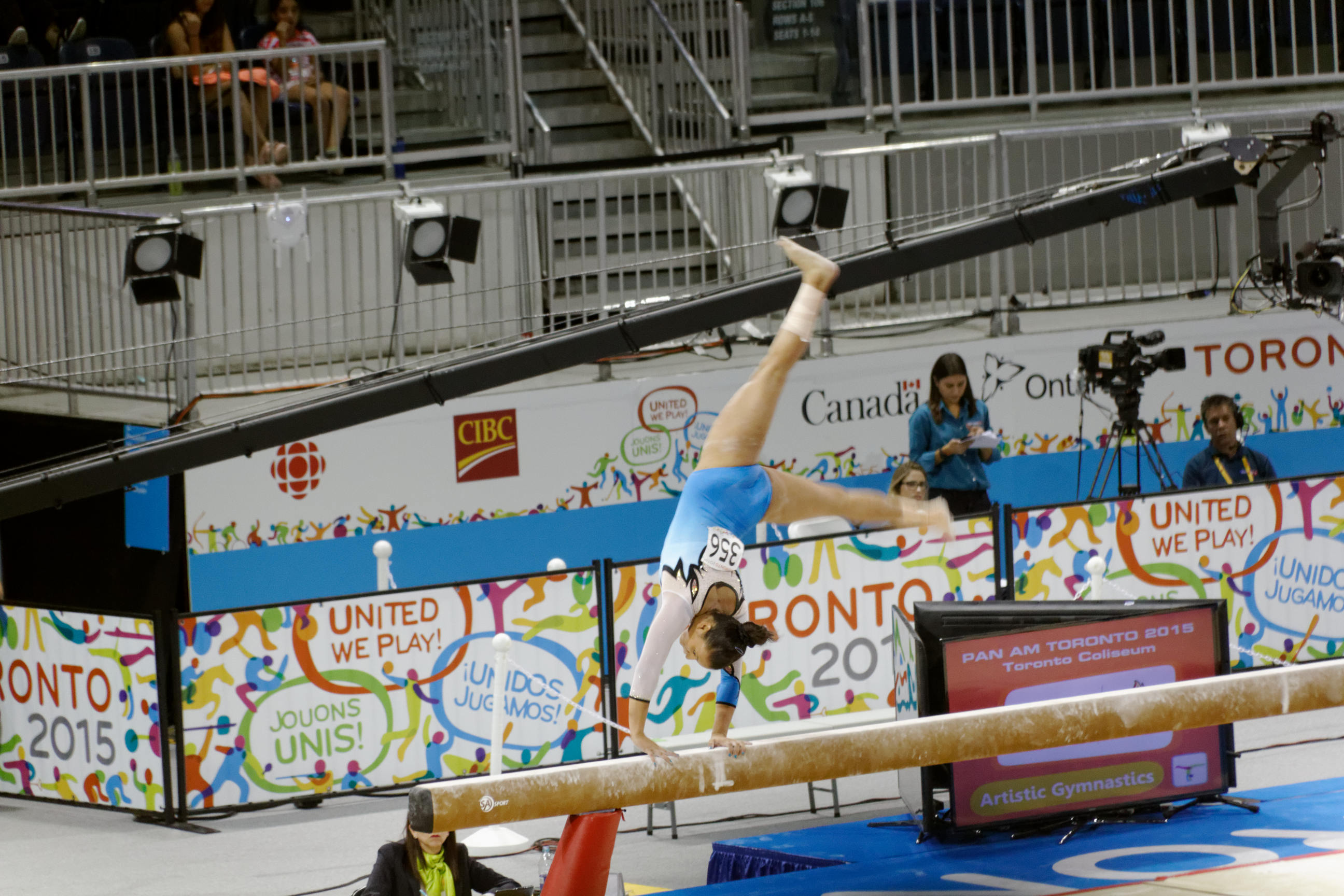
Women's gymnastics at the 2015 Pan Am Games

The competitions took place at the Ricoh Coliseum (Toronto Coliseum) located about in CIBC Pan Am Park, about 7 kilometres from the athletes village. The arena had a capacity of about 7,200 people per session.

== Competition schedule ==
The following is the competition schedule for the gymnastics competitions:

Q	Qualification	F	Final

Artistic
Event↓/Date →	Sat 11	Sun 12	Mon 13	Tue 14	Wed 15
Men's individual all-around	Q		F		
Men's team all-around	F				
Men's floor	Q			F	
Men's horizontal bar	Q				F
Men's parallel bars	Q				F
Men's pommel horse	Q			F	
Men's rings	Q			F	
Men's vault	Q				F
Women's individual all-around		Q	F		
Women's team all-around		F			
Women's balance beam		Q			F
Women's floor		Q			F
Women's uneven bars		Q		F	
Women's vault		Q		F	

Rhythmic
Event↓/Date →	Fri 17	Sat 18	Sun 19	Mon 20
Individual all-around	Q	F		
Individual ball	Q		F	
Individual club	Q			F
Individual hoop	Q		F	
Individual ribbon	Q			F
Group all-around	Q	F		
5 ribbons			F	
Group 6 clubs + 2 hoops				F

Trampoline
Event↓/Date →	Sat 18	Sun 19
Men	Q	F
Women	Q	F

== Medal summary ==
=== Medal table ===
* Host nation (Canada)

Rank	Nation	Gold	Silver	Bronze	Total
1	United States	11	13	5	29
2	Canada*	5	3	6	14
3	Brazil	3	2	5	10
4	Colombia	3	0	3	6
5	Cuba	2	2	2	6
6	Guatemala	1	0	1	2
7	Mexico	0	1	2	3
8	Dominican Republic	0	1	0	1
8	Venezuela	0	1	0	1
Totals (9 entries)		25	23	24	72

=== Artistic gymnastics ===
==== Men ====
Games	Gold	Silver	Bronze
Team all-around	United States; Marvin Kimble; Steven Legendre; Sam Mikulak; Paul Ruggeri; Donnell Whittenburg	Brazil; Francisco Junior; Caio Souza; Lucas Bitencourt; Arthur Zanetti; Arthur Nory	Colombia; Carlos Calvo; Jossimar Calvo; Jorge Hugo Giraldo; Didier Lugo; Jhonny Muñoz
Individual all-around	Sam Mikulak; United States	Manrique Larduet; Cuba	Jossimar Calvo; Colombia
Floor exercise	Jorge Vega; Guatemala	Donnell Whittenburg; United States	Sam Mikulak; United States
Pommel horse	Jossimar Calvo; Colombia Marvin Kimble; United States	—N/a	Daniel Corral; Mexico
Rings	Arthur Zanetti; Brazil	Donnell Whittenburg; United States	Manrique Larduet; Cuba
Vault	Manrique Larduet; Cuba	Donnell Whittenburg; United States	Caio Souza; Brazil
Parallel bars	Jossimar Calvo; Colombia	Manrique Larduet; Cuba	Sam Mikulak; United States
Horizontal bar	Jossimar Calvo; Colombia	Kevin Lytwyn; Canada	Paul Ruggeri; United States

==== Women ====
Event	Gold	Silver	Bronze
Team all-around	United States; Madison Desch; Rachel Gowey; Amelia Hundley; Emily Schild; Megan Skaggs	Canada; Ellie Black; Maegan Chant; Madison Copiak; Isabela Onyshko; Victoria Woo	Brazil; Lorrane Oliveira; Leticia Costa; Flávia Saraiva; Daniele Hypólito; Julie Sinmon
Individual all-around	Ellie Black; Canada	Madison Desch; United States	Flávia Saraiva; Brazil
Vault	Marcia Videaux; Cuba	Yamilet Peña; Dominican Republic	Ellie Black; Canada
Uneven bars	Rachel Gowey; United States	Jessica López; Venezuela	Amelia Hundley; United States
Balance beam	Ellie Black; Canada	Megan Skaggs; United States	Victoria Woo; Canada
Floor exercise	Ellie Black; Canada	Amelia Hundley; United States	Ana Sofía Gómez; Guatemala

=== Rhythmic gymnastics ===
==== Individual ====
Event	Gold	Silver	Bronze
Individual all-around	Laura Zeng; United States	Jasmine Kerber; United States	Patricia Bezzoubenko; Canada
Ball	Laura Zeng; United States	Jasmine Kerber; United States	Karla Diaz; Mexico
Clubs	Laura Zeng; United States	Patricia Bezzoubenko; Canada	Jasmine Kerber; United States
Hoop	Laura Zeng; United States	Jasmine Kerber; United States	Angélica Kvieczynski; Brazil
Ribbon	Laura Zeng; United States	Jasmine Kerber; United States	Angélica Kvieczynski; Brazil

==== Group ====
Event	Gold	Silver	Bronze
Group all-around	Brazil; Dayane Amaral; Morgana Gmach; Emanuelle Lima; Jessica Maier; Ana Paula Ribeiro; Beatriz Pomini	United States; Kiana Eide; Alisa Kano; Natalie McGiffert; Jennifer Rokhman; Monica Rokhman; Kristen Shaldybin	Cuba; Claudia Arjona; Zenia Fernandez; Melissa Kindelan; Martha Perez; Adriana Ramirez; Legna Savon
5 ribbons	Brazil; Dayane Amaral; Morgana Gmach; Emanuelle Lima; Jessica Maier; Ana Paula Ribeiro; Beatriz Pomini	United States; Kiana Eide; Alisa Kano; Natalie McGiffert; Jennifer Rokhman; Monica Rokhman; Kristen Shaldybin	Canada; Katrina Cameron; Maya Kojevnikov; Lucinda Nowell; Vanessa Panov; Anjelika Reznik; Victoria Reznik
6 clubs + 2 hoops	United States; Kiana Eide; Alisa Kano; Natalie McGiffert; Jennifer Rokhman; Monica Rokhman; Kristen Shaldybin	Brazil; Dayane Amaral; Morgana Gmach; Emanuelle Lima; Jessica Maier; Ana Paula Ribeiro; Beatriz Pomini	Canada; Katrina Cameron; Maya Kojevnikov; Lucinda Nowell; Vanessa Panov; Anjelika Reznik; Victoria Reznik

=== Trampoline ===
Event	Gold	Silver	Bronze
Men's individual	Keegan Soehn; Canada	Steven Gluckstein; United States	Ángel Hernández; Colombia
Women's individual	Rosie MacLennan; Canada	Dafne Navarro; Mexico	Karen Cockburn; Canada

== Participating nations ==
A total of 24 countries entered athletes in at least one discipline.

Artistic

The following nations participated in artistic gymnastics at the 2015 Pan American Games.

- Argentina (8)
- Bahamas (1)
- Bermuda (1)
- Bolivia (2)
- Brazil (10)
- Canada (10)
- Cayman Islands (1)
- Chile (8)
- Colombia (10)
- Costa Rica (1)
- Cuba (10)
- Dominican Republic (2)
- Ecuador (2)
- El Salvador (1)
- Guatemala (2)
- Honduras (1)
- Mexico (10)
- Panama (2)
- Peru (4)
- Puerto Rico (7)
- Trinidad and Tobago (2)
- United States (10)
- Uruguay (2)
- Venezuela (8)

Rhythmic

The following nations participated in rhythmic gymnastics at the 2015 Pan American Games.

- Argentina (2)
- Brazil (8)
- Canada (8)
- Chile (1)
- Colombia (1)
- Cuba (7)
- Ecuador (1)
- Mexico (8)
- United States (8)
- Venezuela (2)

Trampoline

The following nations participated in trampolining at the 2015 Pan American Games.

- Argentina (2)
- Brazil (2)
- Canada (4)
- Colombia (1)
- Mexico (2)
- United States (4)
- Venezuela (1)

== Qualification ==
A total of 176 gymnasts are allowed to compete (114 in artistic, 46 in rhythmic and 16 in trampoline). A nation may enter a maximum of 22 athletes across all disciplines (five in each gender for artistic, six athletes in rhythmic group, two in individual and two in each trampoline event).

== See also ==
- Pan American Gymnastics Championships
- South American Gymnastics Championships
- Gymnastics at the 2016 Summer Olympics
