= Gymnastics at the 2015 Pan American Games – Women's rhythmic individual ribbon =

Women's rhythmic individual ribbon at the 2015 Pan American Games
- Venue: Toronto Coliseum
- Dates: July 18–20
- Competitors: 8 from 4 nations
- Winning score: 16.267

Medalists
Gold medal	Laura Zeng	United States
Silver medal	Jasmine Kerber	United States
Bronze medal	Angelica Kvieczynski	Brazil

The women's rhythmic individual ribbon gymnastic event at the 2015 Pan American Games was held on July 18 and 20 at the Toronto Coliseum. The qualification round was held as part of the individual all around competition on July 18 and the final was held on July 20.

== Schedule ==
All times are Eastern Daylight Time (UTC-4).

Date	Time	Round
July 18, 2015	11:00	Qualification
July 20, 2015	10:45	Finals

== Results ==
=== Qualification ===
Rank	Gymnast	Ribbon (rhythmic gymnastics)	Notes
1	Laura Zeng (USA)	16.667	Q
2	Angelica Kvieczynski (BRA)	15.375	Q
3	Karla Diaz Arnal (MEX)	15.033	Q
4	Patricia Bezzoubenko (CAN)	14.933	Q
5	Jasmine Kerber (USA)	14.517	Q
6	Carmen Whelan (CAN)	14.483	Q
7	Rut Castillo (MEX)	14.450	Q
8	Natalia Azevedo Gaudio (BRA)	13.983	Q
9	Michelle Sanchez (VEN)	13.617	R
10	Grisbel Lopez (VEN)	12.667	R

=== Final ===
Rank	Gymnast	Ribbon (rhythmic gymnastics)	Notes
1st place, gold medalist(s)	Laura Zeng (USA)	16.267	
2nd place, silver medalist(s)	Jasmine Kerber (USA)	15.992	
3rd place, bronze medalist(s)	Angelica Kvieczynski (BRA)	15.633	
4	Patricia Bezzoubenko (CAN)	15.300	
5	Karla Diaz Arnal (MEX)	14.767	
6	Rut Castillo (MEX)	14.200	
7	Carmen Whelan (CAN)	13.733	
8	Natalia Azevedo Gaudio (BRA)	13.517	
