= Gymnastics at the 2015 Pan American Games – Women's rhythmic individual all-around =

Women's rhythmic individual all-around at the 2015 Pan American Games
- Venue: Toronto Coliseum
- Dates: July 17–18
- Competitors: 16 from 10 nations
- Winning score: 64.575

Medalists
Gold medal	Laura Zeng	United States
Silver medal	Jasmine Kerber	United States
Bronze medal	Patricia Bezzoubenko	Canada

The women's rhythmic individual all-around gymnastic event at the 2015 Pan American Games was held on July 17–18 at the Toronto Coliseum.

== Schedule ==
All times are Eastern Standard Time (UTC-3).

Date	Time	Round
July 17, 2015	10:00	Final Rotation 1
July 17, 2015	11:00	Final Rotation 2
July 18, 2015	10:00	Final Rotation 3
July 18, 2015	11:00	Final Rotation 4

== Results ==
Rank	Gymnast	Hoop (rhythmic gymnastics)	Ball (rhythmic gymnastics)	Clubs (rhythmic gymnastics)	Ribbon (rhythmic gymnastics)	Total
1st place, gold medalist(s)	Laura Zeng (USA)	15.183	16.292	16.433	16.667	64.575
2nd place, silver medalist(s)	Jasmine Kerber (USA)	16.517	16.233	14.933	14.517	62.200
3rd place, bronze medalist(s)	Patricia Bezzoubenko (CAN)	13.450	15.933	16.083	14.933	60.399
4	Angelica Kvieczynski (BRA)	15.100	15.500	14.200	15.375	60.175
5	Karla Diaz Arnal (MEX)	14.934	15.142	14.817	15.033	59.926
6	Carmen Whelan (CAN)	14.958	14.650	14.700	14.483	58.791
7	Rut Castillo (MEX)	14.717	14.133	13.958	14.450	57.258
8	Natalia Azevedo Gaudio (BRA)	15.300	12.90	13.733	13.983	55.916
9	Michelle Sanchez (VEN)	14.450	13.567	13.283	13.617	54.917
10	Brenda Leyva (CUB)	12.742	13.000	12.492	12.533	50.767
11	Grisbel Lopez (VEN)	10.383	13.375	12.242	12.667	47.667
12	Lina Dussan (COL)	12.250	10.867	12.333	11.892	47.342
13	Melissa Perez (ECU)	11.858	11.075	12.250	10.775	45.958
14	Valeska Gonzalez (CHI)	11.192	11.317	9.925	11.417	43.851
15	Karen Pereira (ARG)	11.758	10.242	11.167	9.633	42.800
16	Micaela Herbon (ARG)	11.550	10.392	9.167	9.125	40.234
