= Gymnastics at the 2015 Pan American Games – Women's rhythmic individual hoop =

Women's rhythmic individual hoop at the 2015 Pan American Games
- Venue: Toronto Coliseum
- Dates: July 17–19
- Competitors: 8 from 5 nations
- Winning score: 16.833

Medalists
Gold medal	Laura Zeng	United States
Silver medal	Jasmine Kerber	United States
Bronze medal	Angelica Kvieczynski	Brazil

The women's rhythmic individual hoop gymnastic event at the 2015 Pan American Games was held on July 17 and 19 at the Toronto Coliseum. The qualification round was held as part of the individual all around competition on July 17 and the final was held on July 19.

== Schedule ==
All times are Eastern Daylight Time (UTC-4).

Date	Time	Round
July 17, 2015	10:00	Qualification
July 19, 2015	10:00	Finals

== Results ==
=== Qualification ===
Rank	Gymnast	Hoop (rhythmic gymnastics)	Notes
1	Jasmine Kerber (USA)	16.517	Q
2	Natalia Azevedo Gaudio (BRA)	15.300	Q
3	Laura Zeng (USA)	15.183	Q
4	Angelica Kvieczynski (BRA)	15.100	Q
5	Carmen Whelan (CAN)	14.958	Q
6	Karla Diaz Arnal (MEX)	14.934	Q
7	Rut Castillo (MEX)	14.717	Q
8	Michelle Sanchez (VEN)	14.450	Q
9	Patricia Bezzoubenko (CAN)	13.450	R
10	Brenda Leyva (CUB)	12.742	R

=== Final ===
Rank	Gymnast	Hoop (rhythmic gymnastics)	Notes
1st place, gold medalist(s)	Laura Zeng (USA)	16.833	
2nd place, silver medalist(s)	Jasmine Kerber (USA)	16.300	
3rd place, bronze medalist(s)	Angelica Kvieczynski (BRA)	15.358	
4	Natalia Azevedo Gaudio (BRA)	14.975	
5	Carmen Whelan (CAN)	14.633	
6	Rut Castillo (MEX)	14.425	
7	Karla Diaz Arnal (MEX)	13.917	
8	Michelle Sanchez (VEN)	13.433	
