= Gymnastics at the 2015 Pan American Games – Women's rhythmic individual ball =

Women's rhythmic individual ball at the 2015 Pan American Games
- Venue: Toronto Coliseum
- Dates: July 17–19
- Competitors: 8 from 5 nations
- Winning score: 16.883

Medalists
Gold medal	Laura Zeng	United States
Silver medal	Jasmine Kerber	United States
Bronze medal	Karla Diaz Arnal	Mexico

The Women's rhythmic individual ball gymnastic event at the 2015 Pan American Games was held on July 17 and 19 at the Toronto Coliseum. The qualification round was held as part of the individual all around competition on July 17 and the final was held on July 19.

== Schedule ==
All times are Eastern Daylight Time (UTC-4).

Date	Time	Round
July 17, 2015	11:00	Qualification
July 19, 2015	10:45	Finals

== Results ==
=== Qualification ===
Rank	Gymnast	Ball (rhythmic gymnastics)	Notes
1	Laura Zeng (USA)	16.292	Q
2	Jasmine Kerber (USA)	16.233	Q
3	Patricia Bezzoubenko (CAN)	15.933	Q
4	Angelica Kvieczynski (BRA)	15.500	Q
5	Karla Diaz Arnal (MEX)	15.142	Q
6	Carmen Whelan (CAN)	14.650	Q
7	Rut Castillo (MEX)	14.133	Q
8	Michelle Sanchez (VEN)	13.567	Q
9	Brenda Leyva (CUB)	13.000	R
10	Natalia Azevedo Gaudio (BRA)	12.900	R

=== Final ===
Rank	Gymnast	Ball (rhythmic gymnastics)	Notes
1st place, gold medalist(s)	Laura Zeng (USA)	16.883	
2nd place, silver medalist(s)	Jasmine Kerber (USA)	16.100	
3rd place, bronze medalist(s)	Karla Diaz Arnal (MEX)	15.267	
4	Carmen Whelan (CAN)	14.817	
5	Rut Castillo (MEX)	14.808	
6	Angelica Kvieczynski (BRA)	14.633	
7	Patricia Bezzoubenko (CAN)	14.283	
8	Michelle Sanchez (VEN)	13.308	
