= Serena Lu =

American rhythmic gymnast

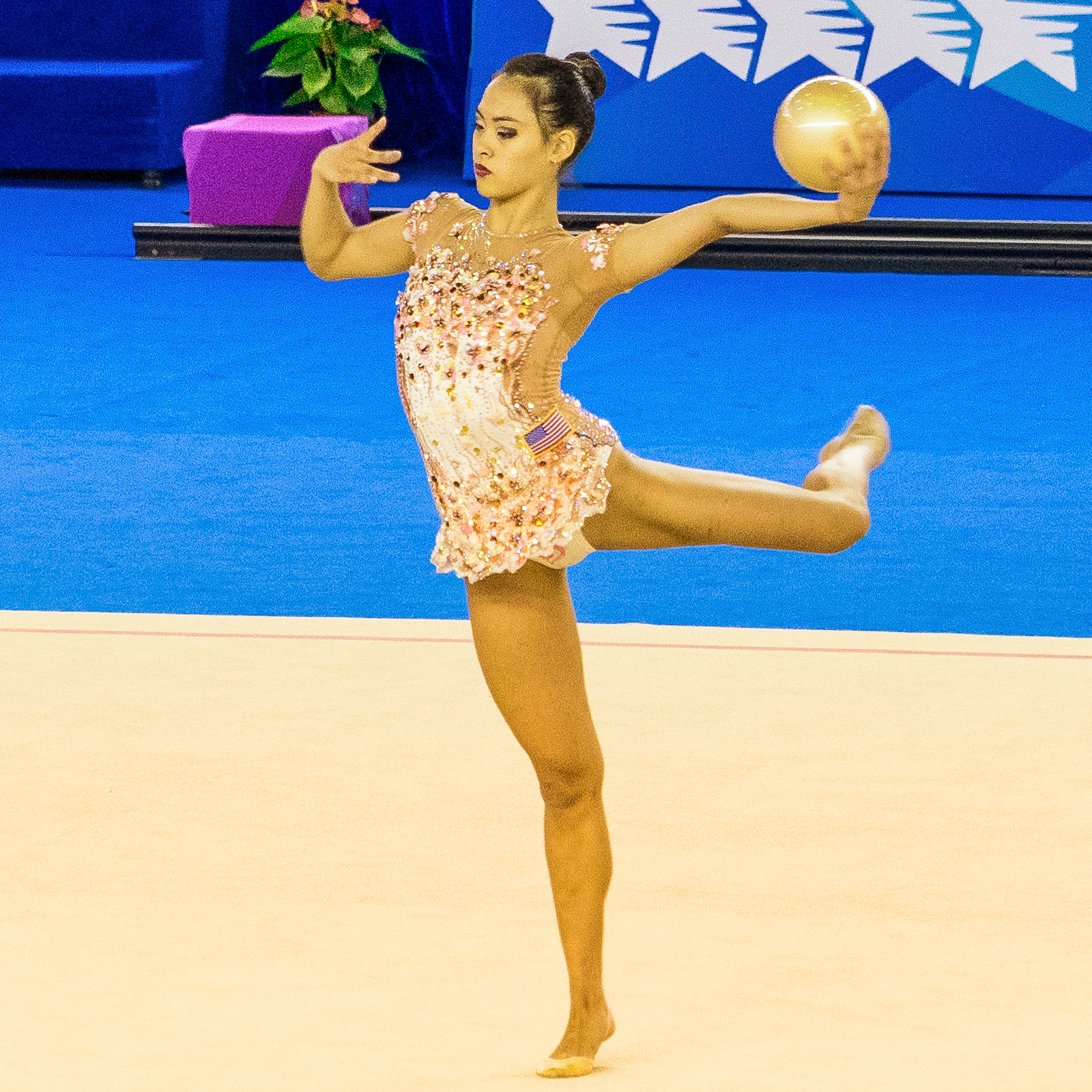
- Lu at the 2017 Summer Universiade

Personal information
- Born: 30 April 1998 (age 28) Minneapolis

Gymnastics career
- Discipline: Rhythmic gymnastics
- Country represented: United States; (2011-2017 2023-)
- Club: Isadora
- Head coach: Natalya Kiriyenko
- Assistant coaches: Irina Khamidullina, Lyubov Maslova
Medal record
Representing United States
Rhythmic gymnastics
Pan American Championships
Gold medal – first place	2014 Missisagua	Team

Serena Lu (born 30 April 1998) is an American rhythmic gymnast. She represents the United States in international competitions.

== Personal life ==
Lu's parents are both originally from China and immigrated to the United States around 1990.

She has appeared on NBC's 'America's Most Talented Kids' and performed as Sorrow in the Minnesota Opera's production of 'Madame Butterfly'. As a ballet dancer, she has performed 'The Russian Dance' in Loyce Houlton's 'Nutcracker Fantasy', a production of the Minnesota Dance Theatre since 2007, in which she alternated with her sister.

Lu graduated from Princeton University in 2020 with a degree in psychology and minors in cognitive science and dance. She works at the New York County District Attorney's office.

== Gymnastics career ==
Lu took up rhythmic gymnastics after her mother saw an advertisement in the newspaper and encouraged her and her sister to take up gymnastics.

In 2011 she entered the national team in her first year as a junior; at the national championships, she won silver with ribbon and bronze with clubs. The following year, she was 6th with clubs in the junior tournament of the World Cup in Pesaro. In June she competed in the 2012 USA Gymnastics Rhythmic Championships, where she was fourth in the all-around, 5th with ball and with ribbon. She also won two medals: silver with hoop, tied with Monica Rokhman, and bronze with clubs.

In February 2013 she competed at the Rhythmic Invitational, where she took silver in the all-around as well as with ball, clubs and ribbon, in addition to bronze with hoop. In June, at the USA Championships, she won bronze in the all-around. In the event finals, she won gold with ball, silver with ribbon and bronze with hoop.

Lu became a senior in 2014. She debuted at the Gracia Cup in Budapest, where she was 9th overall and won bronze with clubs. In April she was 21st in the all-around, 20th with hoop, 22nd with ball, 26th with clubs and 18th with ribbon at the World Cup in Lisbon. In May she won two bronze medals, with ball and clubs, at the Irina Deleanu Cup. In July she took part in the USA Championships, where she won bronze in the all-around. In the event finals, she won silver with clubs and ended 8th with ribbon and fourth with hoop and ball.

At the Pan American Championships she competed with hoop and ball and won gold in teams along with her teammates Jasmine Kerber, Rebecca Sereda, and Aliya Protto. Selected for the World Championships in Izmir, she was 50th with hoop, 29th with ball and 12th in teams with Sereda and Kerber.

In 2015 she started her season at the International Tournament of Pas de Calais, taking silver with clubs in addition to four bronze medals in the all-around and the other three event finals. In April she was 12th overall at the World Cup in Bucharest. A week later she won bronze with ball and ribbon in the International Tournament of the World Cup in Pesaro. At the national championships, she won bronze in the all-around. She also won gold with ball and silver with ribbon, tied with Kerber, and finished 6th with hoop and 5th with clubs. In September she performed with ribbon at the World Championships in Stuttgart, where she was 30th with the apparatus and 9th in teams along with her teammates Laura Zeng, Jasmine Kerber and Camilla Feeley.

In May 2016 she had a training camp in Russia before competing at the World Cup in Sofia. She finished 14th in the all-around, 16th with hoop, 15th with ball, 15th with clubs and 13th with ribbon. In June, at the national championships, she won bronze in the all-around and with clubs and silver with hoop and ribbon.

In April 2017 she took part in the International Rhythmic Gymnastics Tournament in Corbeil-Essones, finishing in 6th overall. A month later, she was 10th in the all-around and 7th with hoop at the World Cup in Portimão. At nationals she was 5th with hoop, 6th in the all-around and 7th with ball. In August she was selected for the Summer Universiade in Taipei. There she was 7th in the all-around and 4th with ball and with ribbon.

At the end of 2017, she retired from competition. During the COVID-19 pandemic, she began coaching, first over video and then in person at her home gym. She also became an athlete representative for USA Gymnastics. Lu began to realize that she missed competing and took up practicing again in 2021, training in the evenings after work. In an interview about her experience and identity as an Asian-American, Lu said that she began to embrace her identity more as an adult than she did as a child, and that she had started to express this through her rhythmic gymnastics routines. A friend helped her create a ribbon routine set to music from the 2002 film Hero.

Lu returned to competition in 2022. She finished fourth in the all-around at the national championships, which led to her once again being placed on the national team.

In early 2023, Lu competed at the domestic Rhythmic Challenge, where she took 5th place with ball. In May she participated in the 2023 Ritam Cup in Belgrade, taking 8th place with ball and with clubs, 6th with hoop, 5th in the all-around and 4th with ribbon. Days later she finished 10th place at the USA Elite Qualifiers. At the national championships, she was 8th overall and with clubs and with ribbon.

In 2024 she was fourth with ribbon and 8th in all-around at the Elite Qualifiers. At the USA Championships in June, Lu was 8th in the all-around and with hoop.
