= Gymnastics at the 2015 Pan American Games – Women's rhythmic individual club =

Women's rhythmic individual club at the 2015 Pan American Games
- Venue: Toronto Coliseum
- Dates: July 18–20
- Competitors: 8 from 4 nations
- Winning score: 16.167

Medalists
Gold medal	Laura Zeng	United States
Silver medal	Patricia Bezzoubenko	Canada
Bronze medal	Jasmine Kerber	United States

The women's rhythmic individual club gymnastic event at the 2015 Pan American Games was held on July 18 and 20 at the Toronto Coliseum. The qualification round was held as part of the individual all around competition on July 18 and the final was held on July 20.

== Schedule ==
All times are Eastern Daylight Time (UTC-4).

Date	Time	Round
July 18, 2015	10:00	Qualification
July 20, 2015	10:00	Finals

== Results ==
=== Qualification ===
Rank	Gymnast	Clubs (rhythmic gymnastics)	Notes
1	Laura Zeng (USA)	16.433	Q
2	Patricia Bezzoubenko (CAN)	16.083	Q
3	Jasmine Kerber (USA)	14.933	Q
4	Karla Diaz Arnal (MEX)	14.817	Q
5	Carmen Whelan (CAN)	14.700	Q
6	Angelica Kvieczynski (BRA)	14.200	Q
7	Rut Castillo (MEX)	13.958	Q
8	Natalia Azevedo Gaudio (BRA)	13.733	Q
9	Michelle Sanchez (VEN)	13.283	R
10	Brenda Leyva (CUB)	12.492	R

=== Final ===
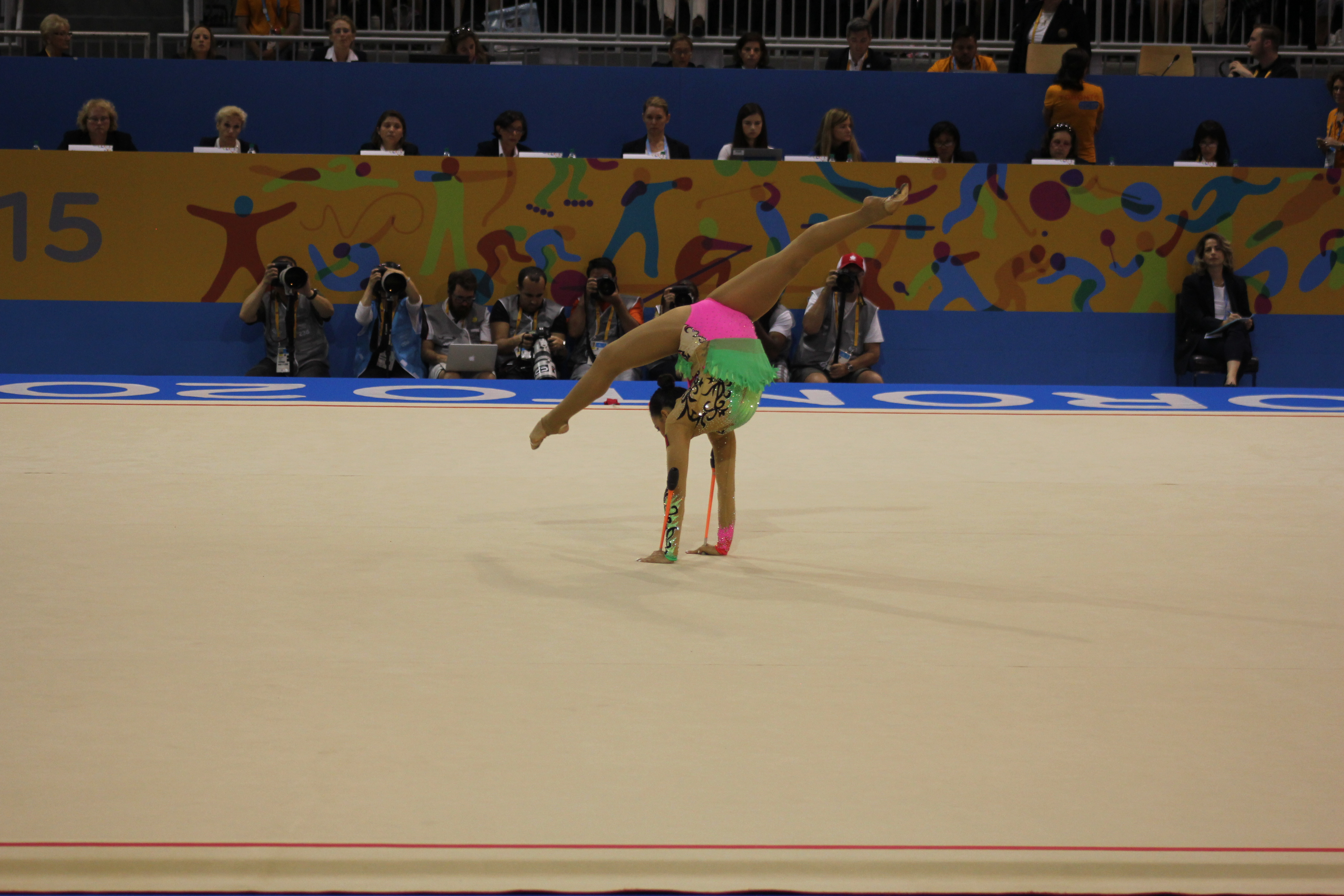
Karla Diaz (Mex)

Rank	Gymnast	Clubs (rhythmic gymnastics)	Notes
1st place, gold medalist(s)	Laura Zeng (USA)	16.167	
2nd place, silver medalist(s)	Patricia Bezzoubenko (CAN)	15.933	
3rd place, bronze medalist(s)	Jasmine Kerber (USA)	15.833	
4	Rut Castillo (MEX)	15.317	
5	Angelica Kvieczynski (BRA)	15.267	
6	Karla Diaz Arnal (MEX)	14.467	
7	Carmen Whelan (CAN)	14.042	
8	Natalia Azevedo Gaudio (BRA)	13.633	
