= Rut Castillo =

Mexican rhythmic gymnast

- Full name: Rut Castillo Galindo
- Nickname: Rutilia
- Born: 16 September 1990 (age 35) Guadalajara, Jalisco, Mexico

Gymnastics career
- Discipline: Rhythmic gymnastics
- Country represented: (2005–present)
- Head coach: Eliza Meza
Medal record
Representing Mexico
Rhythmic Gymnastics
Pan American Games
| Silver medal – second place | 2007 Rio de Janeiro | Hoop |
| Bronze medal – third place | 2007 Rio de Janeiro | All-around |
| Bronze medal – third place | 2007 Rio de Janeiro | Clubs |
Pan American Championships
| Gold medal – first place | 2021 Rio de Janeiro | All-around |
| Silver medal – second place | 2018 Lima | Team |
| Silver medal – second place | 2021 Rio de Janeiro | Team |
| Bronze medal – third place | 2014 Mississauga | Team |
| Bronze medal – third place | 2005 Vitória | Team |
| Bronze medal – third place | 2018 Lima | Ball |
| Disqualified | 2010 Guadalajara | Team |
| Disqualified | 2010 Guadalajara | Hoop |
| Disqualified | 2010 Guadalajara | Rope |
Central American and Caribbean Games
| Gold medal – first place | 2006 Cartagena | Team |
| Gold medal – first place | 2010 Mayagüez | All-around |
| Gold medal – first place | 2010 Mayagüez | Ribbon |
| Gold medal – first place | 2014 Veracruz | Ball |
| Gold medal – first place | 2014 Veracruz | Hoop |
| Gold medal – first place | 2018 Barranquilla | All-around |
| Gold medal – first place | 2018 Barranquilla | Clubs |
| Gold medal – first place | 2018 Barranquilla | Ribbon |
| Silver medal – second place | 2006 Cartagena | All-around |
| Silver medal – second place | 2006 Cartagena | Ball |
| Silver medal – second place | 2010 Mayagüez | Ball |
| Silver medal – second place | 2010 Mayagüez | Hoop |
| Silver medal – second place | 2010 Mayagüez | Rope |
| Silver medal – second place | 2014 Veracruz | All-around |
| Silver medal – second place | 2014 Veracruz | Ribbon |
| Silver medal – second place | 2018 Barranquilla | Hoop |
| Bronze medal – third place | 2006 Cartagena | Rope |

Rut Castillo Galindo (born 16 September 1990) is a Mexican individual rhythmic gymnast. She represented Mexico at the 2020 Summer Olympics and became the first Mexican rhythmic gymnast to compete at an Olympic Games. She is the 2021 Pan American all-around champion. At the 2007 Pan American Games, she won the silver medal in hoop and the bronze medals in the all-around and clubs. She is an eight-time Central American and Caribbean Games champion. She has also competed at nine World Championships (2007, 2009, 2010, 2011, 2013, 2014, 2015, 2018, and 2019).

== Early life ==
Castillo was born on 16 September 1990 in Guadalajara. She began rhythmic gymnastics when she was six years old. Her brother, Job Castillo, plays badminton internationally for Mexico, and her sister, Sara Castillo, is a badminton coach.

== Career ==
=== 2005–2009 ===
At the 2005 Pan American Championships, Castillo won the bronze medal in the team event. Then at the 2006 Central American and Caribbean Games, she won the gold medal in the team event. Individually, she won the silver medals in the all-around and the ball, both behind Cynthia Valdez, and the bronze medal in the rope. Then at the 2007 Pan American Games, she won the bronze medal in the all-around behind Lisa Wang and Valdez. In the event finals, she won the silver medal in the hoop behind Alexandra Orlando, and she won the bronze medal in clubs behind Orlando and Wang. She competed at her first World Championships in 2007, finished 60th in the all-around during the qualification round. She also competed in the group event, replacing one of the Mexican gymnasts who got injured at the last minute. At her second World Championships in 2009, she placed 63rd in the all-around and helped the Mexican team in 28th.

=== 2010 ===
Castillo won the all-around gold medal at the 2010 Central American and Caribbean Games. She also won the gold medal in the Ribbon, and she won the silver medals in the ball, hoop, and rope. Then at the 2010 World Championships, she finished 38th in the all-around, and Mexico finished 18th in the team competition. In December 2010, she won three medals at the 2010 Pan American Championships, team gold, hoop gold, and rope silver. However, she tested positive for Sibutramine, and in March 2011, she received a six-month suspension and was stripped of her medals.

=== 2011–2014 ===
Castillo returned to competition at the 2011 World Championships where she finished 71st in the all-around and 17th with the Mexican team. Then at the 2013 World Championships, she finished 44th in the all-around. She began the 2014 season at the Pan American Championships where she won the team bronze medal. Then at the 2014 World Championships, she finished 50th in the all-around and 17th in the team competition. At the 2014 Central American and Caribbean Games, she won gold medals in the ball and hoop and the silver medals in the all-around and hoop, both behind Cynthia Valdez.

=== 2015–2017 ===
Castillo was selected to represent Mexico at the 2015 Pan American Games where she finished seventh in the all-around and qualified for all four event finals. She finished fifth in the ball final, fourth in the clubs final, and sixth in the hoop final and the ribbon final. Then at the 2015 World Championships, she finished 57th in the individual all-around and 19th with the Mexican team. This result was not high enough for Castillo to qualify a spot for the 2016 Olympic Games. She then represented Mexico at the 2017 Summer Universiade and finished ninth in the all-around final. She also qualified for the hoop and the clubs finals where she finished sixth and seventh, respectively.

=== 2018–2019 ===
Castillo began the 2018 season at Central American and Caribbean Games where she won her second all-around title. She also won the gold medal in the clubs and ribbon, and she won the silver medal in the hoop behind teammate Marina Malpica. The gold medal that she won in the clubs final was Mexico's 100th gold medal at the Central American and Caribbean Games. She then competed at the 2018 World Championships where she finished 31st in the all-around and 18th with the Mexican team. Then at the 2018 Pan American Championships in Lima, she helped the Mexican team win the silver medal behind the United States, and she won the bronze medal in the ball behind Americans Laura Zeng and Nastasya Generalova. She represented Mexico at the 2019 Pan American Games, finishing tenth in the all-around and seventh in the ribbon final. She then competed at the 2019 World Championships in Baku and finished 50th in the all-around and 25th with the Mexican team.

=== 2021 ===
At the 2021 Pan American Championships in Rio de Janeiro, Castillo helped the Mexican team win the silver medal behind Brazil. She then won the gold medal in the all-around ahead of Bárbara Domingos and Natália Gaudio and qualified for the 2020 Olympic Games. She became the first Mexican rhythmic gymnast to qualify for an Olympic Games. At the 2020 Olympic Games, Castillo finished 22nd in the qualification round for the individual all-around.

== Personal life ==
Castillo is openly lesbian. She was one of the two openly LGBTQ+ athletes representing Mexico at the 2020 Summer Olympics, and she was the only openly LGBTQ+ rhythmic gymnast at the 2020 Olympics.
