= Jennifer Rokhman =

American group rhythmic gymnast

- Born: May 27, 1997 (age 29) Northbrook, Illinois, U.S.
- Relatives: Monica Rokhman (sister)

Gymnastics career
- Discipline: Rhythmic gymnastics
- Country represented: United States
- Club: North Shore Rhythmic Gymnastics
- Retired: yes
Medal record
Group rhythmic gymnastics
Representing United States
Pan American Games
Gold medal – first place	2015 Toronto	6 clubs + 2 hoops
Silver medal – second place	2015 Toronto	Group All-around
Silver medal – second place	2015 Toronto	5 ribbons
Pan American Championships
Silver medal – second place	2014 Mississauga	Group all-around
Silver medal – second place	2014 Mississauga	10 clubs

Jennifer Rokhman (born May 27, 1997) is a retired American rhythmic gymnast. She represented her country in international competitions.

== Biography ==
Rokhman was born in Northbrook, Illinois, to Dmitry and Sveltana Rokhman, Russian Jews who immigrated to the United States. Her twin sister Monica was also a member of the national group. In 2010, the two sisters moved back to Illinois to train for the national rhythmic gymnastics team. In 2012, as a junior, she won silver with ribbon at the Schmiden International Tournament. She won another silver with ribbon at the Opal Cup in Calais, where she finished in 6th place overall.

She became a senior in 2013 and began competed as a member of the national group. In April she competed in the World Cup in Lisbon, being 7th with 2 balls & 3 ribbons and 8th with 10 clubs. Weeks later, the group was 10th in the all-around at the World Cup in Pesaro. In August, they were 18th at the World Cup in Saint Petersburg.

Rokhman was selected for the World Championships in Kyiv, along with Alisa Kano, Monica Rokhman, Natalie Mc Giffert, Sharon Dassouli and Laura Tutunikov. The group took 14th place in the all-around, 12th with 10 clubs and 15th with 3 balls & 2 ribbons.

In March 2014 the group was 8th with 10 clubs at the World Cup in Stuttgart. A month later, they finished in 13th place at the World Cup stage in Lison. In August, the American group won two silvers, one in the all-around and with 10 clubs, at the Pan American Championships in Mississauga, Ontario. In September the group, consisting of Rokhman, Kiana Eide, Alisa Kano, Natalie Mc Giffert, Monica Rokhman and Kristen Shaldybin, finished 14th in the all-around, 14th with 5 pairs of clubs and 15th in the mixed-apparatus event at the World Championships in Izmir.

In 2015 she debuted at the Grand Prix in Thiais, where the group was 7th in the all-around, 6th with 5 ribbons and 5th with 3 hoops and 4 clubs. At the World Cup in Lisbon, the group took 12th place overall. In July she competed in the Pan American Games in Toronto, winning gold with 3 hoops and 4 clubs, and silver in the all-around and with 5 ribbons. A month later she participated in the last World Cup of the season in Kazan, where the group was 12th in the all-around.

In September, she and her teammates Kiana Eide, Alisa Kano, Natalie Mc Giffert, Monica Rokhman and Kristen Shaldybin, competed at the World Championships in Stuttgart. They were 13th overall, 11th with 10 clubs and 15th with 3 balls and 2 ribbons.

In 2016 the American group was 7th in the 3 hoops & 4 clubs final at the Thiais Grand Prix. At the World Cup in Pesaro, they were 16th overall. In late May they were 5th in the all-around and 8th in both finals at the World Cup in Minsk. In July, at the World Cup in Baku, she was 8th overall and in both event finals. In August Rokhman was named a reserve for the group, whose competing members were Kiana Eide, Alisa Kano, Natalie McGiffert, Monica Rokhman and Kristen Shaldybin, for the 2016 Olympic Games in Rio de Janeiro. There the group took 14th place in the qualification round and didn't advance to the final.
