= Monica Rokhman =

American group rhythmic gymnast

- Born: May 27, 1997 (age 29) Northbrook, Illinois, U.S.
- Height: 5 ft 7 in (170 cm)
- Relatives: Jennifer Rokhman (sister)

Gymnastics career
- Discipline: Rhythmic gymnastics
- Country represented: United States
- Club: North Shore Rhythmic Gymnastics
- Retired: 2016
Medal record
Group rhythmic gymnastics
Representing United States
Pan American Games
Gold medal – first place	2015 Toronto	6 clubs + 2 hoops
Silver medal – second place	2015 Toronto	Group All-around
Silver medal – second place	2015 Toronto	5 ribbons
Pan American Championships
Silver medal – second place	2014 Mississauga	Group all-around
Silver medal – second place	2014 Mississauga	10 clubs

Monica Rokhman (born May 27, 1997) is a retired American group rhythmic gymnast.

== Biography ==
Rokhman was born in Northbrook, Illinois, to Dmitry and Svetlana Rokhman, Russian Jews who immigrated to the United States. She competed together with Jennifer Rokhman, her twin sister, and was raised in San Diego, California. In 2010, the two sisters moved back to Illinois to train for the national rhythmic gymnastics team. She was a member of the American team at the 2016 Olympics in Rio de Janeiro.

In 2014, she was incorporated into the national senior group. In March, the group was eighth with 10 clubs at the World Cup in Stuttgart. A month later, they finished 13th at the World Cup stage in Lison. In August, the American group won two silvers, one in the all-around and one with 10 clubs, at the Pan American Championships in Mississauga, Ontario. In September the group, consisting of Rokhman, Kiana Eide, Alisa Kano, Natalie McGiffert, Jennifer Rokhman and Kristen Shaldybin, finished 14th in the all-around, 14th with five pairs of clubs, and 15th in the mixed-apparatus event at the World Championships in Izmir.

In 2015, she debuted at the Grand Prix in Thiais, where she and the group was seventh in the all-around, sixth with five ribbons, and fifth with three hoops and four clubs. At the World Cup in Lisbon, the group took 12th overall. In July she competed in the Pan American Games in Toronto, winning gold with three hoops and four clubs, and silver in the all-around and with five ribbons. A month later, she participated in the last World Cup of the season in Kazan, where the group was 12th in the all-around.

In September, she and her teammates Kiana Eide, Alisa Kano, Natalie McGiffert, Jennifer Rokhman, and Kristen Shaldybin, competed at the World Championships in Stuttgart. They were 13th overall, 11th with 10 clubs, and 15th with three balls and two ribbons. The American group finished 13th with 32.299 points, ahead of Brazil and the highest among non-Asian and non-European countries, and qualified to the 2016 Summer Olympics.

In 2016, the American group was seventh in the three hoops and four clubs final at the Thiais Grand Prix. At the World Cup in Pesaro, they were 16th overall. In late May, they were fifth in the all-around and eighth in both finals at the World Cup in Minsk. In July, at the World Cup in Baku, she was eighth overall and in both event finals. In August, Rokhman was selected along with Kiana Eide, Alisa Kano, Natalie McGiffert, and Kristen Shaldybin for the 2016 Olympic Games in Rio de Janeiro. There, the group took 14th place in the qualification round and did not advance to the final.
