= Horse Palace =

Stables building in Toronto, Canada

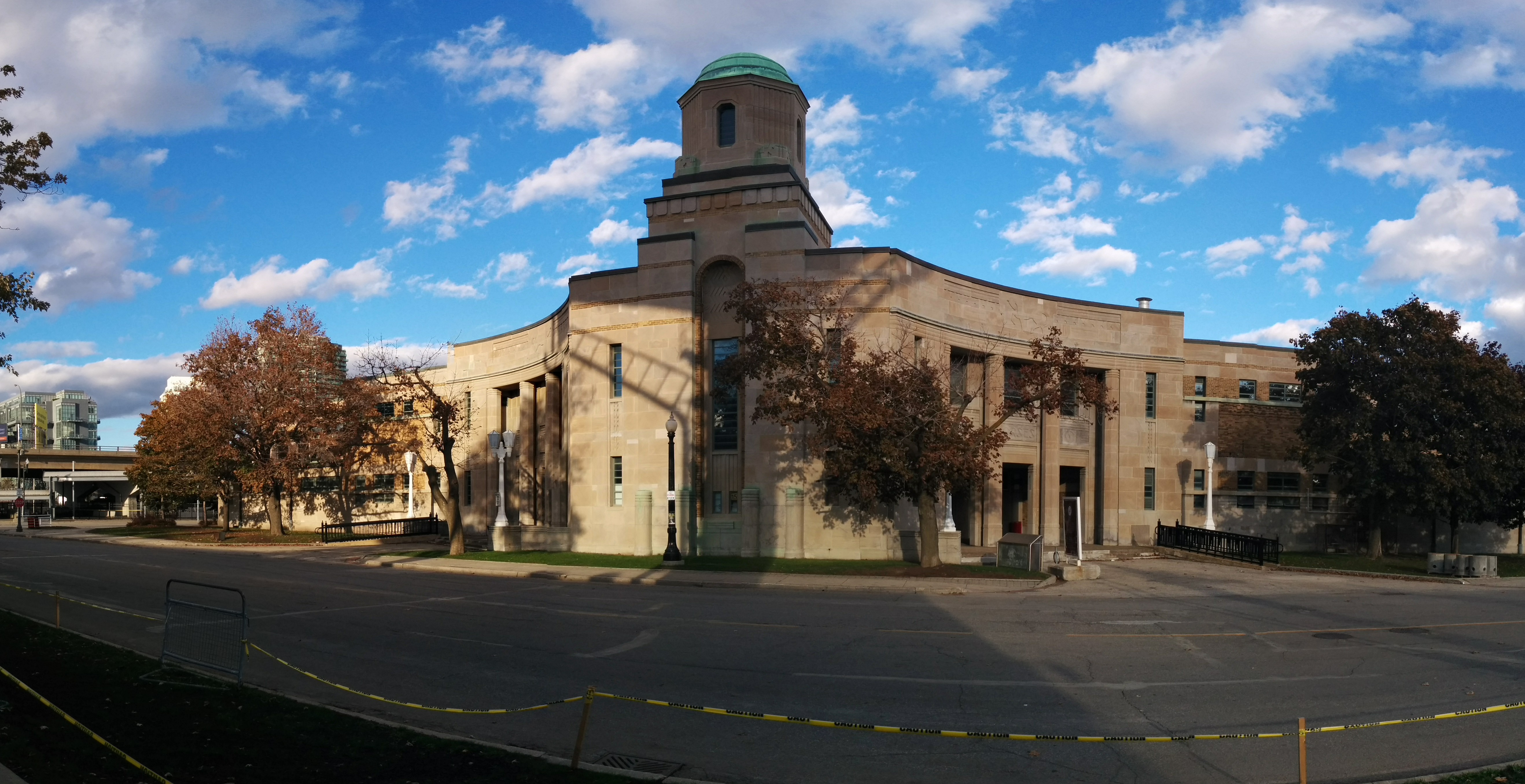
- West elevation of Horse Palace Building
- Interactive map of the Horse Palace area

General information
- Type: stables
- Location: 15 Nova Scotia Avenue, Toronto
- Coordinates: 43.635112°N 79.411197°W
- Completed: 1931
- Owner: City of Toronto

Technical details
- Floor count: 2
- Floor area: 326,190 ft^{2} (30,304 m^{2})

Design and construction
- Architect: James John Woolnough

The Horse Palace is a heritage building at Exhibition Place in Toronto, Ontario, Canada, containing stables, a horse ring and various agencies. It was constructed to support the equestrian events of the Royal Agricultural Winter Fair (Winter Fair). The ornamentation of the building is considered a fine example of Art Deco. It is a listed heritage building.

== Description ==
The building was designed by City Architect James John Woolnough. It cost CA$900,000, ($18 million in 2025 dollars) one-third of the cost covered by the Government of Canada. The main contractor was Christman-Burke Ltd. It took 20 weeks to construct. The building opened on August 15, 1931, in time for the 1931 CNE and the 1931 Winter Fair. When first constructed, it had a horse hospital with a separate entrance and a second-floor lounge for lady exhibitors. The interior floors are concrete, although the stalls have planking floors. The original glass specified by architect Woolnough for the building was sourced from outside Canada, to the disappointment of the 1931 City Council. The building was previously the site of various smaller stables and buildings used by the Winter Fair.

The building, which is 320 feet (98 m)×550 feet (170 m), has 326,190 square feet (30,304 m^{2}) of floor space with 1,200 stalls for horses and other live stock on two floors. In the center is a main practice ring under a cathedral-style glass ceiling. The Art Deco exterior elements of the Horse Palace include a hard-edged angular composition, cubist forms and strong horizontal and vertical planes. The low relief sculptured friezes of horses located on the exterior of the building are also indicative of the Art Deco style of design.

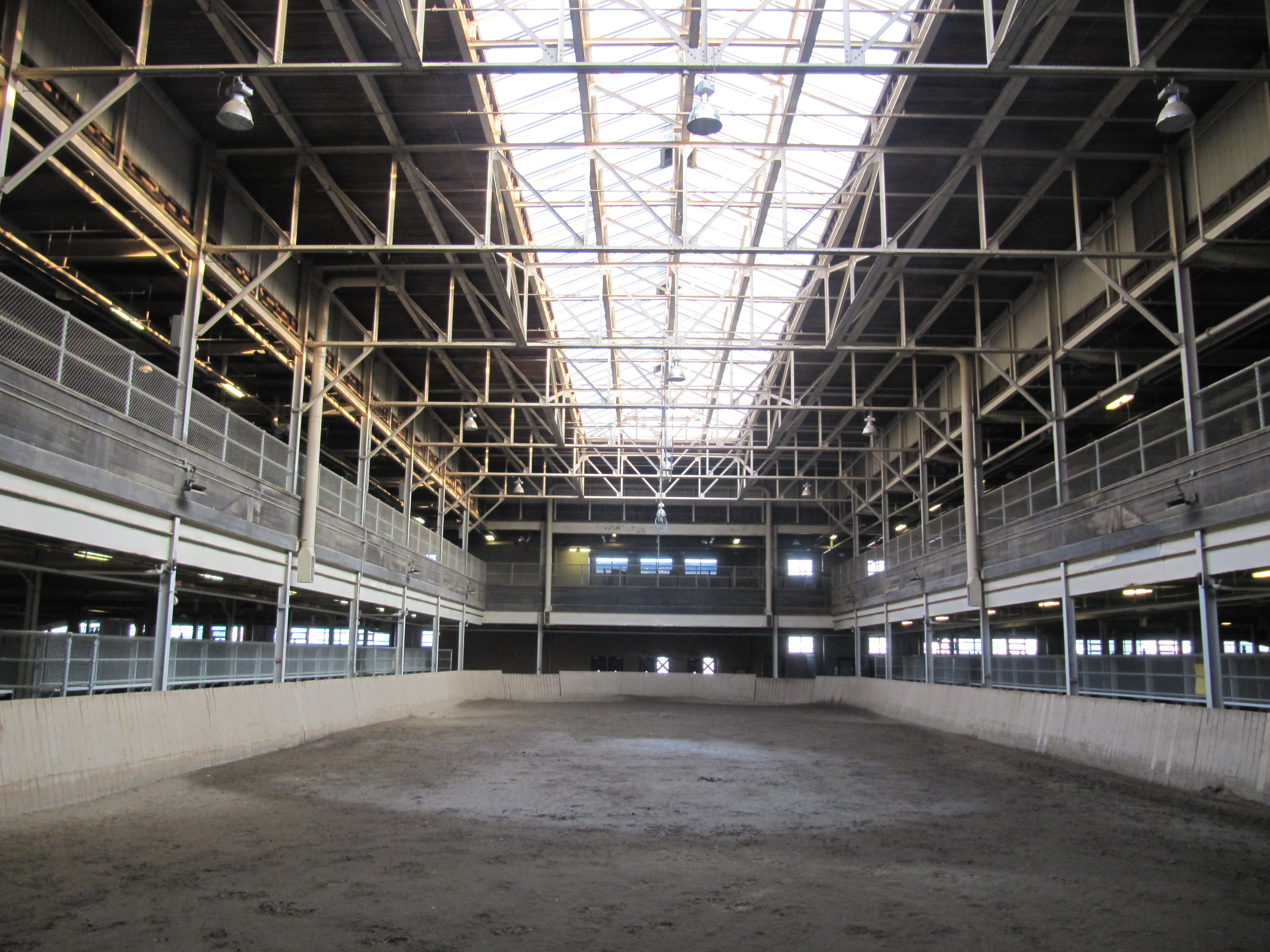
Horse Palace exercise ring

The two-storey building is mostly clad in yellow brick except for entrances and details which are of carved limestone. The roof is a flat roof. The east side faces a covered laneway between the Horse Palace and the Coliseum and is plain. There are two bridges at the second floor connecting to the Coliseum with large garage-type doors underneath. These provide quick and wide access between the buildings to facilitate the quick transfer of animals from the stables to the exhibit and judging areas of the Coliseum. The south façade is mostly brick with rectangular windows on both floors along the length. The façade is dominated by a two-story ornamental stone entrance, with three archways over entrance doors and a small stairway plaza in front with ornamental lights to each side of the plaza. The west side is dominated by a major two-story ornamental entrance, jutting out providing entryways to the northwest and the southwest each with a plaza to the street. The entrance is capped with a cupola. The north façade resembles the southern façade, however instead of an arched entranceway, the entrance is a vehicular entrance with a simple roll-down door that is small for current vehicles.

== History ==
During World War II, the building was used as barracks for soldiers waiting to be posted overseas.

Since 1931, the Horse Palace hosted a Mounted Unit of the Toronto Police during the CNE and the Winter Fair, while during the rest of the year the Unit used stables around the city. In July 2000, the Mounted Unit of the Toronto Police consolidated its operations into a new facility in the Horse Palace. This brought all of the Mounted Unit's personnel together in one facility for the first time in 100 years.

In 1988, the building was designated a "listed" heritage structure. In 1993, the building received restoration work to restore its doors to their original Art Deco appearance.

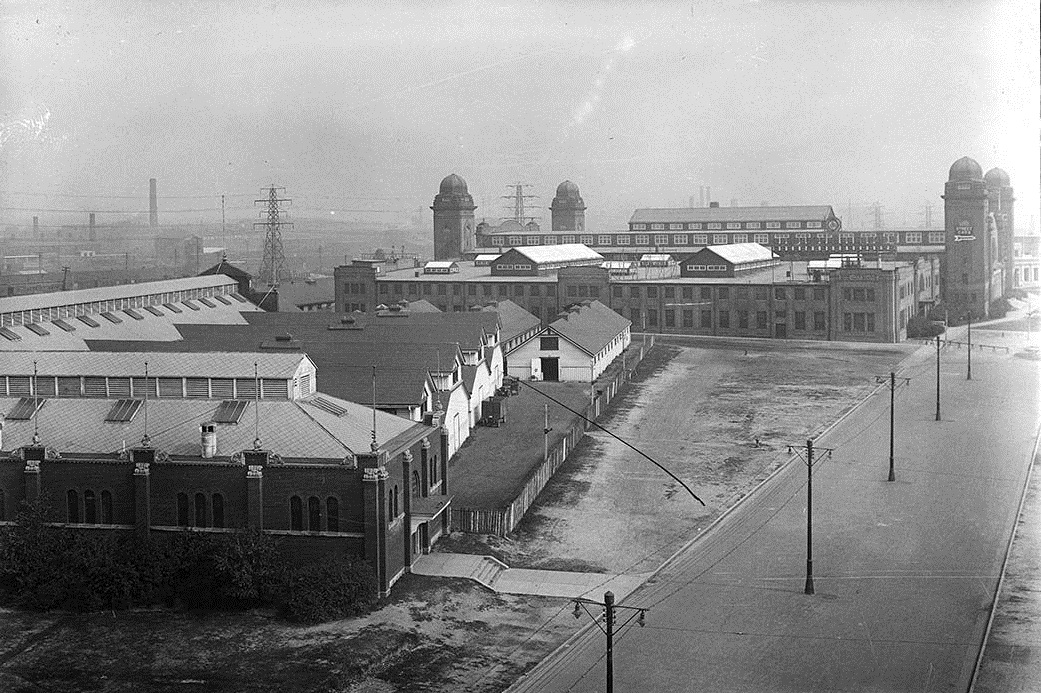
A view of the horse stables and coliseum in Toronto's Exhibition grounds in 1930 prior to the construction of the Horse Palace.

== Usage ==
There are several year-round uses of the Horse Palace. The Toronto Police Service stores the horses of its Mounted Unit there. The Animal Services South Toronto branch houses animals for adoption there. A private riding academy operates out of the Palace.

In August before the CNE, the CNE operates the free "HorseCapades" show in the Horse Palace. It is aimed at families and includes events such as trick riding, wagon rides and grooming horses. The exhibits about horses are moved to the Better Living Centre during the CNE. The Horse Palace is also used for the annual "Toronto Horse Day" event of the Ontario Equestrian Federation.
