= List of Olympic rhythmic gymnasts for Brazil =

Rhythmic gymnastics events have been staged at the Olympic Games since 1984. Brazilian rhythmic gymnasts have participated in six editions of the Summer Olympics. A total of 24 gymnasts have represented Brazil in individual and group events. Brazilian women have yet to win a medal at the Olympics.

== Gymnasts ==
=== Individual ===
Gymnast	Years	Ref.
Rosane Favilla	1984	
Marta Cristina Schonhurst	1992	
Natália Gaudio	2016	
Bárbara Domingos	2024	

=== Group ===
Gymnast	Years	Ref.
Camila Ferezin	2000	
Natália Scherer	2000	
Flávia de Faria	2000	
Alessandra Ferezin	2000	
Thalita Nakadomari	2000	
Dayane Camilo	2000, 2004	
Larissa Barata	2004	
Fernanda Cavalieri	2004	
Ana Maria Maciel	2004	
Tayanne Mantovaneli	2004, 2008	
Jennifer Oliveira	2004	
Luana Faro	2008	
Daniela Leite	2008	
Luisa Matsuo	2008	
Marcela Menezes	2008	
Nicole Muller	2008	
Emanuelle Lima	2016	
Francielly Pereira	2016	
Gabrielle da Silva	2016	
Jessica Maier	2016	
Morgana Gmach	2016	
Maria Eduarda Arakaki	2020, 2024	
Beatriz Linhares	2020	
Déborah Medrado	2020, 2024	
Nicole Pircio	2020, 2024	
Geovanna Santos	2020	
Victória Borges	2024	
Sofia Pereira	2024	
