= Morgana Gmach =

Brazilian rhythmic gymnast

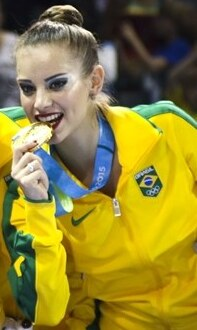
- Gmach at the 2015 Pan American Games

Personal information
- Full name: Morgana Regina Gmach
- Born: 17 June 1994 (age 32)
- Height: 1.59 m (5 ft 3 in)

Gymnastics career
- Discipline: Rhythmic gymnastics
- Country represented: Brazil
- Club: Sadia
- Head coach: Camila Ferezin
Medal record
Representing Brazil
Rhythmic gymnastics
Pan American Games
Gold medal – first place	2015 Toronto	Group all-around
Gold medal – first place	2015 Toronto	5 ribbons
Silver medal – second place	2015 Toronto	6 clubs + 2 hoops
South American Championships
Gold medal – first place	2011 Maracaibo	Team
Gold medal – first place	2011 Maracaibo	All-around
Gold medal – first place	2011 Maracaibo	Hoop
Gold medal – first place	2011 Maracaibo	Ribbon
Gold medal – first place	2019 Bogotá	Group all-around
Gold medal – first place	2019 Bogotá	5 balls
Gold medal – first place	2019 Bogotá	4 clubs + 3 hoops
Silver medal – second place	2011 Maracaibo	Clubs
Bronze medal – third place	2011 Maracaibo	Ball

Morgana Regina Gmach (born June 17, 1994) is a Brazilian rhythmic gymnast. Gmach helped the Brazilian ladies secure a gold-medal triumph in the group all-around at the 2015 Pan American Games in Toronto, Canada, and subsequently competed as a member of the host nation's rhythmic gymnastics squad at the Summer Olympics in Rio de Janeiro by the following year. There, she and fellow gymnasts Emanuelle Lima, Jessica Maier, Gabrielle da Silva, and Francielly Pereira attained a total score of 32.649 on the combination of ribbons, hoops, and clubs for the ninth spot in the qualifying phase of the group all-around, narrowly missing out of the final roster by more than a single point.

== See also ==
- List of Olympic rhythmic gymnasts for Brazil
