= Ana Paula Ribeiro =

Brazilian rhythmic gymnast

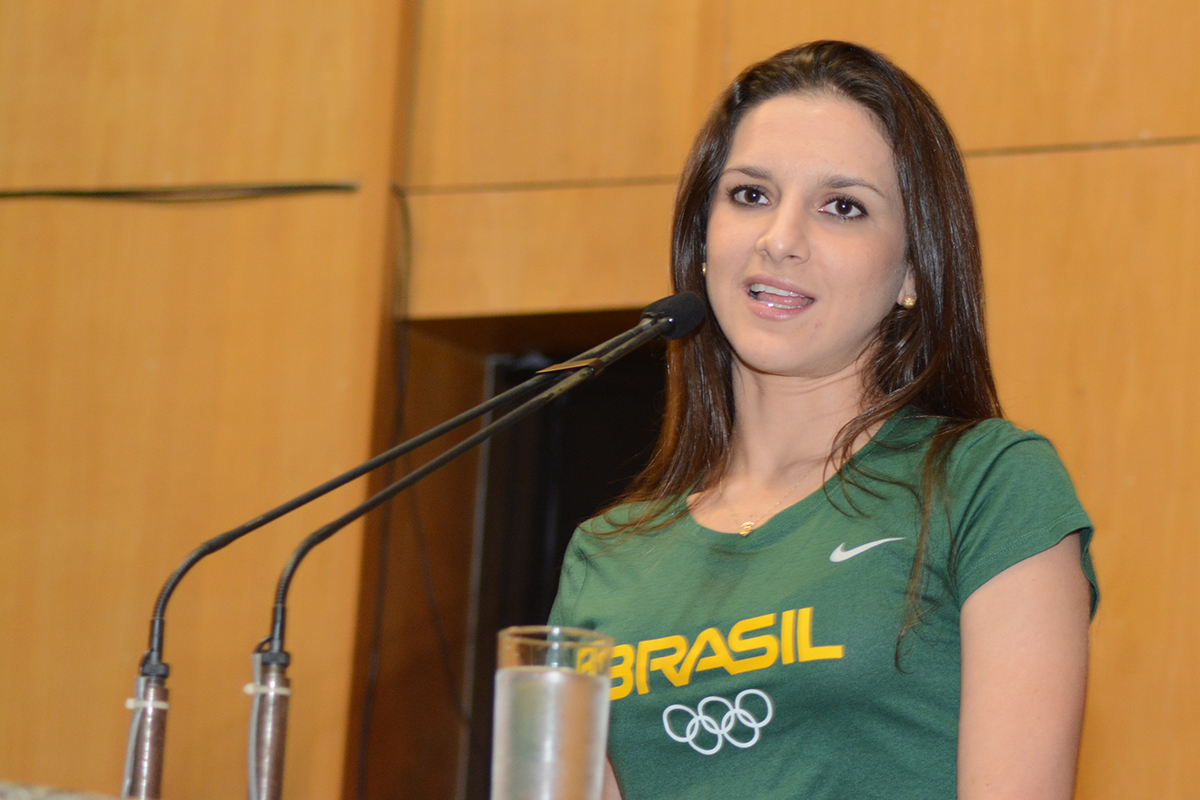

Personal information
- Born: 3 February 1989 (age 37)

Gymnastics career
- Discipline: Rhythmic gymnastics
- Country represented: Brazil (2015)
- Head coach: Camila Ferezin
Medal record
Representing Brazil
Rhythmic Gymnastics
Pan American Games
Gold medal – first place	2015 Toronto	Group all-around
Gold medal – first place	2015 Toronto	5 ribbons
Silver medal – second place	2015 Toronto	6 clubs + 2 hoops
Pan American Championships
Gold medal – first place	2005 Vitória	Ribbon
Silver medal – second place	2005 Vitória	Team
Silver medal – second place	2005 Vitória	Ball
Silver medal – second place	2010 Guadalajara	Group all-around
Bronze medal – third place	2005 Vitória	All-around
Bronze medal – third place	2005 Vitória	Clubs
South American Games
Gold medal – first place	2010 Medellín	Group all-around
Silver medal – second place	2006 Buenos Aires	Team
Silver medal – second place	2006 Buenos Aires	Ball
Silver medal – second place	2010 Medellín	5 hoops
Silver medal – second place	2010 Medellín	3 ribbons + 2 ropes
Bronze medal – third place	2006 Buenos Aires	All-around
Bronze medal – third place	2006 Buenos Aires	Rope
Bronze medal – third place	2006 Buenos Aires	Clubs
South American Championships
Gold medal – first place	2014 Cúcuta	Team

Ana Paula Nórbio Padua Ribeiro (born 3 February 1989) is a Brazilian group rhythmic gymnast. She represents her nation at international competitions. She competed at world championships, including at the 2015 World Rhythmic Gymnastics Championships.
