= Vanessa Panov =

Canadian group rhythmic gymnast

- Born: 26 November 1999 (age 26) Toronto, Ontario, Canada
- Height: 167 cm (5 ft 6 in)

Gymnastics career
- Discipline: Rhythmic gymnastics
- Country represented: Canada; (2015)
Medal record
Group Rhythmic Gymnastics
Representing Canada
Pan American Games
Bronze medal – third place	2015 Toronto	5 ribbons
Bronze medal – third place	2015 Toronto	6 clubs + 2 hoops
Pan American Championships
Bronze medal – third place	2017 Daytona Beach	Group all-around
Bronze medal – third place	2018 Lima	5 hoops

Vanessa Panov (born 26 November 1999) is a Canadian retired group rhythmic gymnast. She competed at the 2014 Summer Youth Olympics and won two bronze medals at the 2015 Pan American Games.

== Early and personal life ==
Panov's mother, Mira Filipova, was also a rhythmic gymnast who competed for Bulgaria in the 1980s. During Panov's career, she was the national group coach for Canada.

Panov studied health sciences at the University of Toronto.

== Career ==
Panov began gymnastics at age 4.

In May 2014, she competed at the Junior Pan American Championships, where she and the other members of the Canadian group placed first in the all-around. This qualified them to compete at the 2014 Summer Youth Olympics; competing there had been a long-term goal of Panov's. In the event finals, they also won two silver medals. At the Youth Olympics, they finished 5th in the all-around.

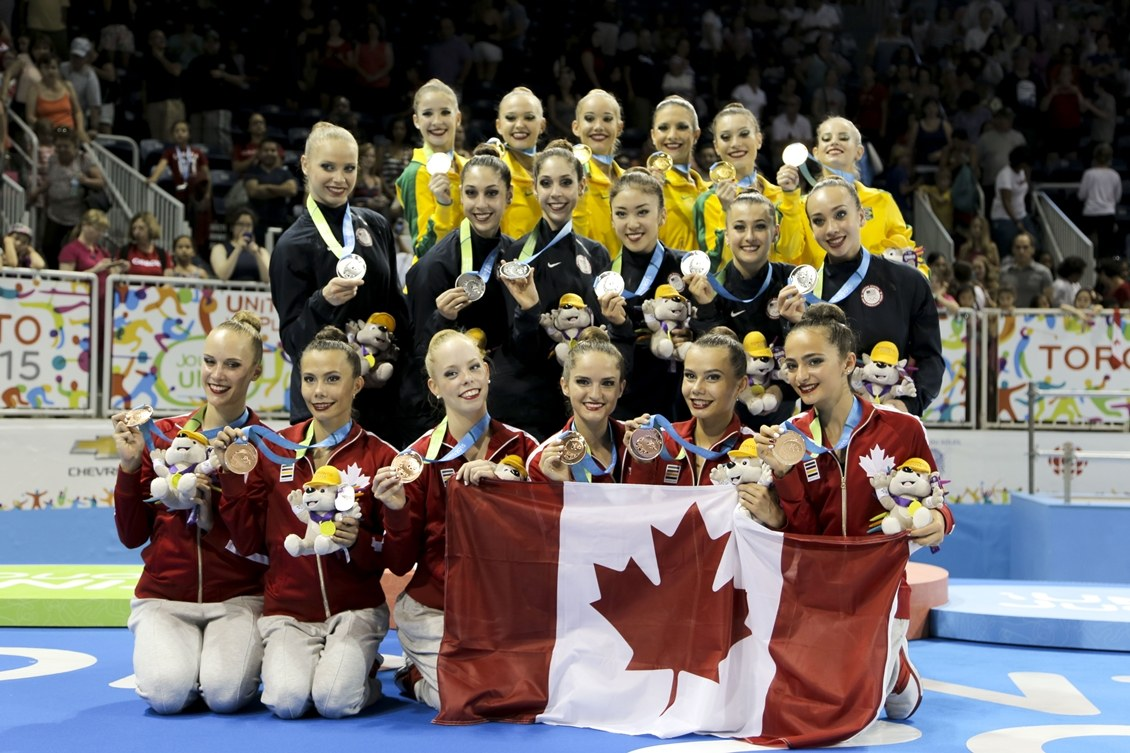
The medal-winning groups in the 2015 Pan American Games 5 ribbons final

The next year, Panov began competing in the senior national group. She competed at the 2015 Pan American Games, held in her hometown of Toronto. There, the group won two bronze medals in the event finals. Panov was the substitute for the group's five ribbons routine and participated in the 3 pairs of clubs + 2 hoops routine. She noted that being a substitute was a difficult task: "We need to learn every single spot so it’s quite challenging and it’s kinda difficult to go through the routine when you’re alone at the side." Later that year, at the 2015 World Championships, the group placed 19th in the all-around. The group had hoped to qualify for the upcoming 2016 Summer Olympics; however, they failed to either qualify a direct spot or the opportunity to compete at a last-chance qualifier.

In 2017, Panov competed with the group in a total of five events on the 2017 World Cup series; they placed 9th in the all-around at three events. At the 2017 World Championships, they placed 21st.

At the 2018 Pan American Championships, the group finished 3th in the all-around and in the 3 balls + 2 ropes final but won bronze in the 5 hoops final. They went on to finish 23rd at the World Championships. Panov said that while the group had done well in practice leading up to the Championships, a few of the group members had ongoing injuries, though she did not think it affected their performance. She also said, "We’re proud of our work despite the few mistakes today." Their placement qualified the group a spot at the 2019 World Championships.

The next year, the group competed at the 2019 Pan American Games, held in Lima, Peru. Ahead of the competition, Panov noted that the group was hoping to qualify for the upcoming 2020 Summer Olympics and that, "Every single competition, big or small, is another stepping stone in preparing us to qualify for Tokyo 2020." At the Games, they placed 5th in the all-around. Later that year, they placed 20th at the World Championships, including a new personal best score in the 3 hoops + 2 pairs of clubs routine. Panov said that the group had considerably changed their choreography and music for the latter routine after the Pan American Games, and that they "were pleased to hear that the crowd loved it and the judges scored us with 3 points higher than at Pan Am Games."

Panov's last international competition was the 2020 Miss Valentine, where the group placed 5th and won bronze in the 3 hoops + 2 pairs of clubs final. The event was held in late February through 1 March, before the COVID-19 pandemic.
