= Victoria Reznik =

Canadian group rhythmic gymnast

- Nickname: Vica
- Born: 25 June 1995 (age 31) Almaty, Kazakhstan
- Height: 166 cm (5 ft 5 in)

Gymnastics career
- Discipline: Rhythmic gymnastics
- Country represented: Canada; (2009–2010, 2014–2015)
Medal record
Rhythmic gymnastics
Representing Canada
Pan American Games
Bronze medal – third place	2015 Toronto	5 ribbons
Bronze medal – third place	2015 Toronto	6 clubs + 2 hoops
Pan American Championships
Silver medal – second place	2014 Mississauga	10 clubs
Bronze medal – third place	2014 Mississauga	3 balls + 2 ribbons
Youth Olympic Games
Bronze medal – third place	2010 Singapore	Group all-around

Victoria Reznik (born 25 June 1995) is a Canadian former rhythmic gymnast who primarily competed as a group member. She won a bronze medal at the 2010 Summer Youth Olympics and two bronze medals at the 2015 Pan American Games. She now works as a lawyer in the United States.

== Early and personal life ==
Reznik was born in Almaty, Kazakhstan. Her family is Jewish, and they moved to Bat Yam, Israel when Reznik was two. When she was 10, they moved again to Toronto, Canada.

She is the twin sister of Anjelika Reznik, who also competed in the Canadian national group. Their grandparents were artistic gymnasts, and their mother was a rhythmic gymnast who competed on the Kazakh national team. She did not initially put them into gymnastics, and when they expressed interest in training recreationally after moving to Canada, she did not intend for them to become elite gymnasts.

== Career ==
Reznik started training at age 10, considered unusually late in rhythmic gymnastics. She described beginning so late compared to her peers as a stressful experience, as "everyone was so good and we didn’t know anything".

At the 2009 Junior Pan American Championships, Reznik won a silver medal in the team event, and she and the group won all three gold medals in the group events. This earned them a berth to compete at the 2010 Youth Olympic Games. In August 2010, she competed at the first-ever Youth Olympics as a group member; the Canadian group rose from 4th after qualifications to win the bronze medal. Reznik expressed happiness about their medal afterward, saying, "This medal means joy and pride and a lot of hard work and sweat."

The next year, Reznik's sister, Anjelika Reznik, successfully tried out for the senior national group; Victoria, however, was not selected. She competed as an individual, then retired for a time, before returning to gymnastics after watching her sister compete at the 2012 Summer Olympics. She spent the next two years working to catch up to the national team.

In 2014, Reznik attempted to join the national senior team again, and this time she was selected. As her sister continued to compete, they worked together in the group. She said of competing alongside her sister, "There’s for sure some competition going on. If she’s better at something, I have to strive to be able to do it as well."

That year, she competed at the Pan American Championships, held in Mississauga, Canada. The group was 5th in the all-around but won bronze in both event finals. They competed at the World Cup held in Pesaro, Italy and placed 20th in the all-around. At the 2014 World Championships, the group placed 21st in the all-around.

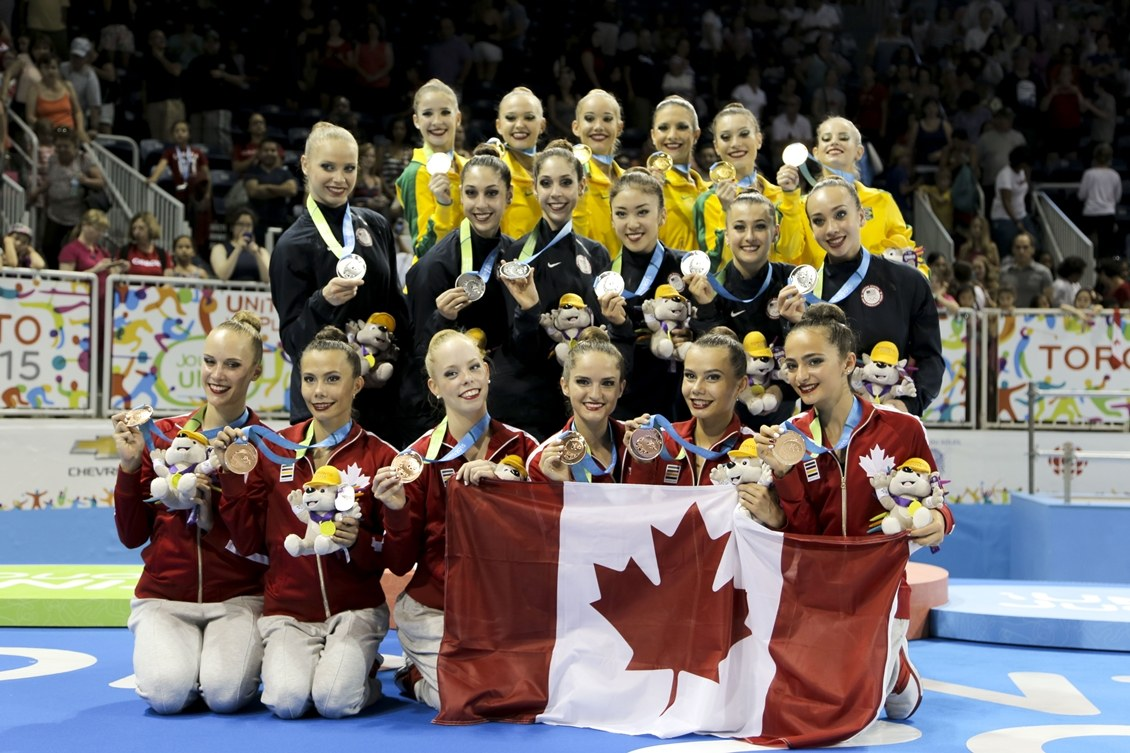
The medal-winning groups in the 2015 Pan American Games 5 ribbons final

Before the 2015 Pan American Games, held in Toronto, high-quality training facilities were built, allowing the team to train properly in Canada. At the Games, the team placed 5th in the all-around and won bronze in both event finals. Reznik expressed happiness about being able to compete in front of a home crowd despite the group's disappointing result in the all-around.

In September, Reznik competed with the Canadian group at the 2015 World Championships and placed 19th in the all-around. They failed to qualify for the 2016 Summer Olympics, and the group members retired, including Reznik.

== Post-gymnastics career ==
Reznik studied politics and governance at Ryerson University. While her sister competed on the school's cheerleading team, Reznik declined to apply to team as well, in favor of focusing on her studies. Afterward, she was employed in both the private sector and in non-governmental organizations before entering the graduate program in development studies at York University. She expressed interest in exploring the idea of peace through sport in relation to the Refugee Olympic Team.

Reznik went on to enroll in a dual JD/MBA degree at Northwestern University in the United States. She graduated in 2024; around the time of her graduation, she had a daughter. She now works in global finance at Sidley Austin in New York.
