= Jessica Maier =

Brazilian rhythmic gymnast

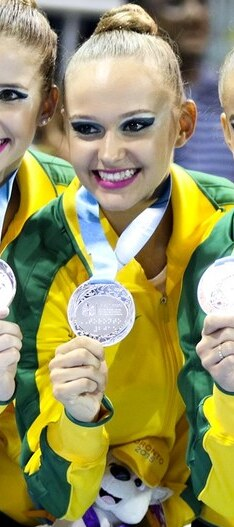
- Maier at the 2015 Pan American Games

Personal information
- Born: 21 August 1994 (age 32)

Gymnastics career
- Discipline: Rhythmic gymnastics
- Country represented: Brazil (2015)
- Head coach: Camila Ferezin
Medal record
Representing Brazil
Group Rhythmic Gymnastics
Pan American Games
Gold medal – first place	2015 Toronto	Group All-around
Gold medal – first place	2015 Toronto	5 ribbons
Silver medal – second place	2015 Toronto	6 clubs + 2 hoops
Pan American Championships
Gold medal – first place	2018 Lima	5 hoops
Silver medal – second place	2010 Guadalajara	Group all-around
Bronze medal – third place	2018 Lima	Group all-around
Bronze medal – third place	2018 Lima	3 balls + 2 ropes
South American Games
Gold medal – first place	2018 Cochabamba	Group all-around
Gold medal – first place	2018 Cochabamba	5 hoops
Gold medal – first place	2018 Cochabamba	3 balls + 2 ropes
South American Championships
Gold medal – first place	2011 Maracaibo	Group all-around
Gold medal – first place	2011 Maracaibo	5 balls
Gold medal – first place	2011 Maracaibo	3 ribbons + 2 hoops

Jéssica Sayonara Maier (born 21 August 1994) is a Brazilian group rhythmic gymnast. She represents her nation at international competitions. She competed at world championships, including at the 2015 World Rhythmic Gymnastics Championships.

== See also ==
- List of Olympic rhythmic gymnasts for Brazil
