= Emanuelle Lima =

Brazilian group rhythmic gymnast

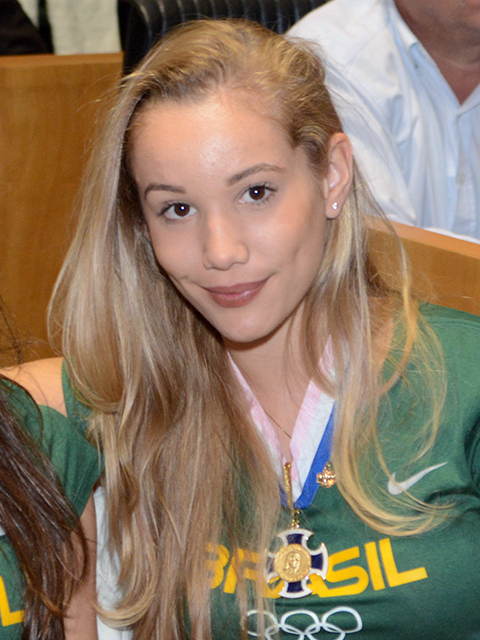

Personal information
- Born: 3 May 1996 (age 30)

Gymnastics career
- Discipline: Rhythmic gymnastics
- Country represented: Brazil (2015)
- Head coach: Camila Ferezin
Medal record
Representing Brazil
Group Rhythmic Gymnastics
Pan American Games
Gold medal – first place	2015 Toronto	Group All-around
Gold medal – first place	2015 Toronto	5 ribbons
Silver medal – second place	2015 Toronto	6 clubs + 2 hoops
Pan American Championships
Silver medal – second place	2014 Mississauga	Team
South American Championships
Gold medal – first place	2013 Santiago	Team
Silver medal – second place	2013 Santiago	Hoop

Emanuelle Leal Lopes e Lima (born 3 May 1996) is a Brazilian group rhythmic gymnast. She represents her nation at international competitions. She competed at world championships, including at the 2015 World Rhythmic Gymnastics Championships.

== See also ==
- List of Olympic rhythmic gymnasts for Brazil
