= Alisa Kano =

American group rhythmic gymnast

- Born: November 7, 1994 (age 31) Tokyo, Japan
- Height: 5 ft 4 in (163 cm)

Gymnastics career
- Discipline: Rhythmic gymnastics
- Country represented: United States
Medal record
Group rhythmic gymnastics
Representing United States
Pan American Games
Gold medal – first place	2015 Toronto	6 clubs + 2 hoops
Silver medal – second place	2015 Toronto	Group All-around
Silver medal – second place	2015 Toronto	5 ribbons

Alisa Kano (born November 7, 1994) is an American group rhythmic gymnast. She represented the United States at the 2015 World Rhythmic Gymnastics Championships. As a member of the American group rhythmic gymnastics team, she won a gold and two silver medals at the 2015 Pan American Games and competed at the 2016 Summer Olympics. Kano graduated from Loyola University Chicago in 2019 with a degree in Exercise Science.
