= Kiana Eide =

American rhythmic gymnast

- Born: September 25, 1998 (age 27) Fridley, Minnesota, U.S.
- Height: 5 ft 3 in (160 cm)

Gymnastics career
- Discipline: Rhythmic gymnastics
- Country represented: United States
Medal record
Group rhythmic gymnastics
Representing United States
Pan American Games
Gold medal – first place	2015 Toronto	6 clubs + 2 hoops
Silver medal – second place	2015 Toronto	Group All-around
Silver medal – second place	2015 Toronto	5 ribbons

Kiana Eide (born September 25, 1998) is an American group rhythmic gymnast. She represented the United States at the 2015 World Rhythmic Gymnastics Championships. As part of the American group rhythmic gymnastics team, she won a gold and two silver medals at the 2015 Pan American Games and competed at the 2016 Summer Olympics.
