= Natalie McGiffert =

American group rhythmic gymnast

- Born: March 14, 1997 (age 29) Los Angeles, California, U.S.
- Height: 5 ft 3 in (160 cm)

Gymnastics career
- Discipline: Rhythmic gymnastics
- Country represented: United States
Medal record
Group rhythmic gymnastics
Representing United States
Pan American Games
Gold medal – first place	2015 Toronto	6 clubs + 2 hoops
Silver medal – second place	2015 Toronto	Group All-around
Silver medal – second place	2015 Toronto	5 ribbons

Natalie McGiffert (born March 14, 1997) is a 2016 Team USA Olympian for group rhythmic gymnast. She also competed at the 2015 World Rhythmic Gymnastics Championships.

McGiffert won a gold medal and two silver medals as part of the American team in group rhythmic gymnastics events at the 2015 Pan American Games. She was part of the American team in the women's rhythmic group all-around event at the 2016 Summer Olympics.
