= Laura Zeng =

American rhythmic gymnast

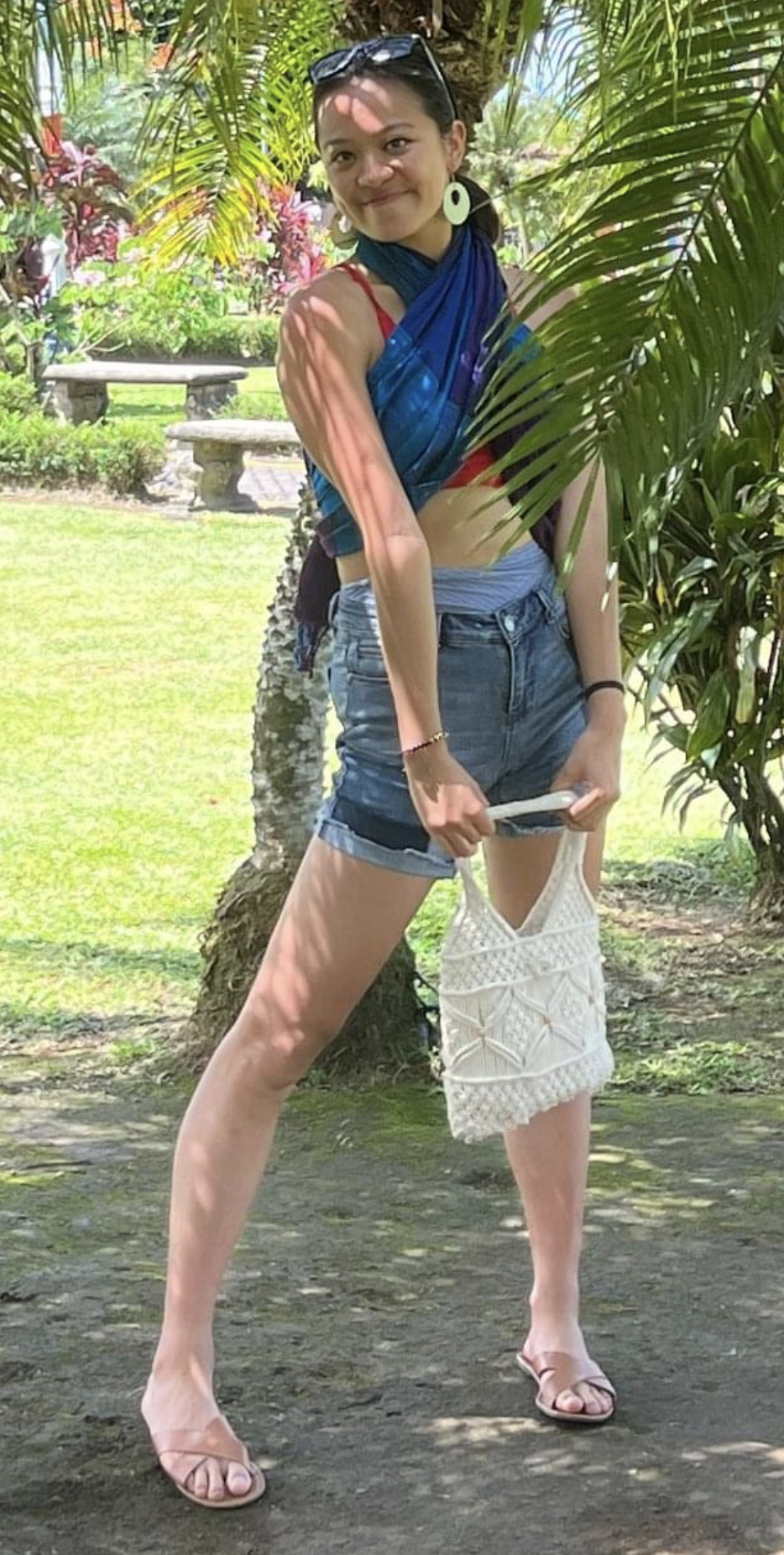
- Zeng near La Fortuna Waterfall in June 2022

Personal information
- Full name: Laura Yihan Zeng
- Born: October 14, 1999 (age 26) Hartford, Connecticut, United States
- Height: 5 ft 3 in (160 cm)

Gymnastics career
- Discipline: Rhythmic gymnastics
- Country represented: United States (2012–21)
- Club: North Shore Rhythmic Gymnastics Center
- Head coach: Natalia Klimouk
- Assistant coaches: Angelina Yovcheva, Dani Takova, Irina Korosteleva
- Retired: January 22, 2022
Medal record
Rhythmic Gymnastics
Representing United States
Event	1st	2nd	3rd
FIG World Cup	0	0	6
Total	0	0	6
Pan American Games
Gold medal – first place	2015 Toronto	All-around
Gold medal – first place	2015 Toronto	Hoop
Gold medal – first place	2015 Toronto	Ball
Gold medal – first place	2015 Toronto	Ribbon
Gold medal – first place	2015 Toronto	Clubs
Pan American Championships
Gold medal – first place	2018 Lima	Team
Gold medal – first place	2018 Lima	All-around
Gold medal – first place	2018 Lima	Hoop
Gold medal – first place	2018 Lima	Ball
Gold medal – first place	2018 Lima	Clubs
Gold medal – first place	2018 Lima	Ribbon
Grand Prix Final
Bronze medal – third place	2019 Brno	Hoop
Summer Universiade
Bronze medal – third place	2019 Naples	All-around
Youth Olympic Games
Bronze medal – third place	2014 Nanjing	All-around

Laura Yihan Zeng (Chinese: 曽昳晗; Zeng Yi-Han; born October 14, 1999) is an American former individual rhythmic gymnast. She represented the United States at the 2016 and 2020 Summer Olympics. She swept all of the events at the 2015 Pan American Games and at the 2018 Pan American Championships. She is the 2014 Youth Olympic and 2019 Summer Universiade all-around bronze medalist and the 2019 Grand Prix Final hoop bronze medalist.

On national level, she is an eight-time US national all-around champion, six times at the senior level (2015–19, 2021) and twice at the junior level (2013–14).

== Personal life ==
Zeng was born in Hartford, Connecticut, and raised in Libertyville, Illinois, where she attended Libertyville High School. Her parents, Li Chen and Tian Zeng, immigrated from China. After first studying Chinese dance and ballet, Zeng started rhythmic gymnastics at age seven after her friend told her about it. Her sister Yecca is eight years older than her and is a fashion designer. In 2018, Laura graduated from high school as a National Merit Scholar Finalist and committed to Yale University. She enrolled at Yale in the fall of 2021 after taking three gap years to train for the 2020 Olympic Games.

== Career ==
When she was eight years old, Zeng won the all-around gold medal at the 2008 J.O. Compulsory Championships in level 5. The next year, she moved up to level 7 and won the all-around gold medal at the 2009 J.O. Optional Championships. Then at the 2010 J.O. Optional Championships, she finished fourth all-around in level 8. She moved up to the Hopes division in 2011 and won the all-around gold medal at the Visa Championships.

=== Junior ===
==== 2012 ====
Zeng began competing as a junior in 2012. She won the all-around silver medal in the junior division of the Rhythmic Challenge held in Colorado Springs, Colorado. She made her international debut at the 2012 Junior Pacific Rim Championships where she won the team gold medal and the all-around silver medal behind Canada's Patricia Bezzoubenko. In the event finals, she won ribbon gold, clubs and ball silver, and hoop bronze. She then competed in the Dundee Cup in Sofia, Bulgaria and won the all-around bronze medal behind Aleksandra Soldatova and Zhena Trashlieva. Then at the USA Gymnastics Rhythmic Championships, she won the all-around silver medal and was named to the United States junior national rhythmic gymnastics team.

==== 2013 ====
Zeng began the 2013 season at the Rhythmic Challenge and won the all-around gold medal. She then competed at the Gymnastik Schmiden International in Fellbach, Germany winning gold in all-around, hoop, clubs, ribbon and bronze in ball. She won another all-around gold medal at the Rhythmic National Qualifier held in Deerfield, Illinois. Then at the U.S. Rhythmic Championships in Orlando, she won her first junior national all-around title.

==== 2014 ====
In 2014, Zeng started her season competing at the Rhythmic Challenge winning the all-around and all four event titles. Then at the Lisbon International Tournament, she won the ball silver medal and the hoop bronze medal. At her next competition, the Pesaro International Junior Tournament, she won the hoop silver medal and bronze medals in team, clubs, and ribbon. At the 2014 Junior Pan American Championships, Zeng swept all gold medals and won the United States a spot at the 2014 Youth Olympic Games. She then traveled to Minsk to compete at the Crystal Rose Junior Tournament where she won team gold, ball and ribbon silver, and hoop and clubs bronze. She defended her junior all-around title at the USA Gymnastics Championships.

Zeng was selected as the sole representative of United States at the 2014 Summer Youth Olympics in Nanjing, China. She placed second in the qualification round behind Russia's Irina Annenkova with a total score of 57.375. She went on to take the all-around bronze in the finals with a total score of 56.750, just two hundredths behind Belarus' Mariya Trubach. This marked the first rhythmic gymnastics medal for the United States at an Olympic or Youth Olympic Games.

=== Senior ===
==== 2015 ====
Zeng began age eligible for senior competition in 2015. She won the all-around gold medal at the Rhythmic Challenge held in Lake Placid, New York. She made her World Cup debut at the Lisbon World Cup and finished fourteenth in the all-around. Then at the Pesaro World Club, she finished eleventh in the all-around and placed seventh in the ribbon final. At the International Rhythmic Gymnastics Tournament in Corbeil-Essonnes, France, she won the all-around bronze medal behind Russians Arina Averina and Dina Averina and won a team silver medal behind the Averinas with teammate Jazzy Kerber. In the event finals, she won silver in clubs and bronze in ball and placed fourth in ribbon. She then won her first senior national all-around title at the USA Gymnastics Championships, and she also won the hoop, clubs, and ribbon titles.

At the Pan American Games, Zeng swept the gold medals in the all-around and all the apparatus finals, becoming the second American to win the all-around and all the apparatus finals at the Pan American Games after Mary Sanders in 2003. Zeng was the most decorated athlete of the Pan American Games. Her next competition was the Kazan World Cup where she finished tenth in the all-around and eighth in the ball final.

Zeng was selected to compete in her first World Championships in Stuttgart alongside Jazzy Kerber, Camilla Feeley and Serena Lu. The team placed ninth, and individually, Zeng ranked eleventh all-around in qualifications. She qualified for the clubs final where she placed seventh. In the all-around finals, she finished eighth with a total of 70.416 points, the best-ever finish for an American rhythmic gymnast at the World Championships, beating the tenth place of Mary Sanders at the 2003 World Championships. Her results earned the United States an individual spot for the 2016 Olympic Games.

==== 2016 ====
Zeng began her 2016 season at the Rhythmic Challenge where she won the all-around gold medal. A couple of weeks later she competed at the Lisbon World Cup where she finished seventh in the all-around with a total of 70.150 points and qualified for three event finals placing eighth in clubs and hoop and fifth in ball. Next she competed at the Pesaro World Cup where she finished nineteenth in the all-around and seventh in the clubs final. At the Minsk World Cup, she made history by becoming the first American to win a medal in a World Cup series when she won bronze medals in both hoop and ribbon. She then won her second consecutive national all-around title and was selected to represent the United States at the 2016 Summer Olympics.

Prior to the Olympic Games, Zeng finished eleventh all-around, sixth in hoop, and fifth in clubs and ribbon at the Kazan World Cup. Then at the Baku World Cup, she placed eleventh all-around, fifth in hoop and clubs, and sixth in ribbon. At the 2016 Summer Olympics held in Rio de Janeiro, Brazil, she finished eleventh all-around in the qualifications, narrowly missing the individual all-around final. Zeng's finish tied for the best for an American rhythmic gymnast with Valerie Zimring's eleventh-place finish at the 1984 Olympic Games in Los Angeles.

==== 2017 ====
Zeng's first competition after the 2016 Olympic Games was the Rhythmic Challenge in Indianapolis, Indiana where she won the all-around gold medal. Then at the Pesaro World Cup, and she finished fourth in the all-around. She qualified for all four event finals and earned her third and fourth career World Cup bronze medals in hoop and clubs and also finished seventh in ball and ribbon. She then participated at the MTM Ljubljana International Tournament and won the all-around gold medal. In event finals, she also took gold in clubs, hoop and ribbon and a bronze medal for ball. She then finished tenth all-around, sixth in ball, and fifth in ribbon at the Guadalajara World Challenge Cup.

Zeng secured her third consecutive senior national all-around title and won the clubs gold medal, the hoop and ribbon silver medals, and the ball bronze medal. She then competed at the World Games in Wrocław, Poland where she finished fifth in clubs and seventh in ball and ribbon. Then at the Kazan World Challenge Cup, she finished eleventh in the all-around. At the World Championships in Pesaro, Zeng finished sixth in the all-around besting her own eighth-place finish in 2015 as the best-ever all-around finish for an American at the World Rhythmic Gymnastics Championships. She also advanced into three event finals along with teammate Evita Griskenas who advanced into two event finals, marking the first time two American gymnasts qualified for event finals at the World Championships. In the event finals, she placed fifth in clubs and ribbon and sixth in ball.

==== 2018 ====
Zeng began the 2018 season at the Rhythmic Challenge and won the all-around gold medal. In April, she competed at the Baku World Cup and won the hoop bronze medal in a tie-breaker with Boryana Kaleyn behind Russia's Mariia Sergeeva and Belarus's Katsiaryna Halkina. Then in July, she won her fourth consecutive national all-around title marking the first rhythmic gymnast to win four U.S. all-around titles since Sue Soffe in 1979. In August, she competed at the BSB Bank World Challenge Cup in Minsk and finished fourteenth in the all-around. The next week she competed at the Kazan World Challenge Cup where she placed fifth in the clubs final and ninth in the all-around. At the World Championships, Zeng, Evita Griskenas, and Camilla Feeley finished seventh in the team event, the highest ever finish for the United States. Individually, she qualified for the all-around final and placed eighth with a total score of 66.950. After the World Championships, she competed at the Pan American Championships and won the all-around gold and team gold with Lili Mizuno and Nastasya Generalova. Zeng also swept the four event gold medals.

On October 18, 2018, Zeng tested positive for acetazolamide during out-of-competition testing. She provided evidence to the United States Anti-Doping Agency (USADA) that she was prescribed an altitude sickness medication containing acetazolamide while on vacation in Machupicchu, Peru believing it was ibuprofen. On December 19, she accepted a six-month suspension from USADA beginning on the date of her positive test.

==== 2019 ====
Zeng began her 2019 season at the Tashkent World Cup where she placed eighth in the all-around and clubs and sixth in ball. She then won a bronze medal in hoop at the Baku World Cup behind Dina Averina and Linoy Ashram. Then in May, she placed sixth all-around, fourth in hoop, fifth in ball, and eighth in clubs at the Guadalajara World Challenge Cup. She won another hoop bronze medal at the Brno Grand Prix and placed fifth in ribbon and tenth in all-around. She then competed at the USA Gymnastics Championships in Des Moines, Iowa, and won her fifth straight all-around national title and also won hoop, ball, and clubs gold and ribbon bronze. She won the all-around bronze medal at the Summer Universiade behind Ekaterina Selezneva and Zohra Aghamirova, and she also finished fourth in the hoop, ball, and clubs final.

Zeng finished sixth in the all-around at the Portimao World Challenge Cup, and she also finished seventh in the hoop, ball, and clubs finals. At the World Championships in Baku, Azerbaijan, the American team of Zeng, Evita Griskenas, and Camilla Feeley placed seventh. In the ribbon final, she finished fifth, and she finished tenth in the all-around final with a total score of 81.850. As a result, Zeng earned one of two spots along with her teammate Evita Griskenas for the United States for the 2020 Summer Olympics, marking the first time the United States qualified two rhythmic gymnasts for the Olympic Games since 1992. At the end of the World Championships, she was awarded the Longines Prize for Elegance.

==== 2020-21 ====
Zeng won the all-around gold medal at the 2020 Rhythmic Challenge in Lake Placid, New York. This was her only competition of 2020 due to the COVID-19 pandemic. She returned to competition in February 2021 at the Rhythmic Challenge and won the all-around silver medal behind Evita Griskenas. Her next competition was the 2021 Sofia World Cup where she finished sixth in hoop, seventh in the all-around, and eighth in ball. Then at the Tashkent World Cup, she finished seventh in hoop and eighth in ball. She finished sixth in hoop and ninth in all-around at the Baku World Cup. Her final World Cup was in Pesaro, and she placed sixth in hoop and seventh all-around and ball.

Zeng won the all-around at the 2021 USA Gymnastics Championships and was selected to represent the United States at the 2020 Summer Olympics. Before the Olympics, she competed at the Israel Grand Prix in Tel Aviv where she placed sixth in clubs and seventh in all-around, hoop, and ball. At the 2020 Olympic Games in Tokyo, she finished thirteenth in the qualification round for the individual all-around and was the third reserve for the final.

== Achievements ==
- First Non-European gymnast to win Longines Prize for Elegance since 1997 when the Prize started.
- First American rhythmic gymnast to qualify for two Olympic Games.
- First and only American rhythmic gymnast to win a medal at the World University Games (2019 Napoli Universiade).
- First American rhythmic gymnast to win a medal at the World Cup series (Minsk 2016, Pesaro 2017, Baku 2018, Baku 2019).
- First and only American rhythmic gymnast to win a medal at the Youth Olympic Games (Nanjing 2014).
- 2013–2019 USA all-around national champion (2013-14 junior, 2015-19 senior).
- Swept all five gold medals in Toronto Pan American Games in 2015. She was the most decorated athlete for the game.
- In Rio Olympic Games in 2016, she finished 11th, which tied the best performance by an American in an Olympics, missing finals by 1/10th point.
- She holds the best All-Around finish in a World Championships by an American ever. She was 6th in the 2017 World Championships in Pesaro, besting her own record of 8th in the 2015 World Championships in Stuttgart.
- First American rhythmic gymnast to qualify for three event finals in a world championship (clubs, ribbon, and ball in 2017 Worlds).
- She holds the best team finish in a World Championship by any American team ever. She, along with Evita Griskenas and Camilla Feeley, finished 7th in the 2018 World Championships in Sofia, and 2019 Worlds in Baku.

== Retirement ==
Zeng announced her retirement from rhythmic gymnastics on her Instagram account on January 22, 2022. She is studying urban studies and cognitive science at Yale University and is a staff reporter for the student newspaper, Yale Daily News.
