= Jasmine Kerber =

American rhythmic gymnast

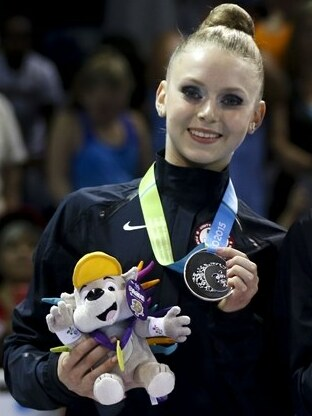
- Kerber on the 2015 Pan American Games hoop final podium

Personal information
- Full name: Jasmine Kerber
- Nickname: Jazzy
- Born: December 4, 1996 (age 29) Chicago, Illinois, United States

Gymnastics career
- Discipline: Rhythmic gymnastics
- Country represented: United States (2009 - 2015)
- Club: North Shore Rhythmics
- Head coach: Natalia Klimouk
- Assistant coaches: Irina Korosteleva, Angelina Yovcheva, Dani Takova
- Retired: 2015
- World ranking: 38 (2015 Season); 24 (2014 Season); 39 (2013 Season)
Medal record
Representing United States
Rhythmic Gymnastics
Pan American Games
Silver medal – second place	2015 Toronto	All-around
Silver medal – second place	2015 Toronto	Hoop
Silver medal – second place	2015 Toronto	Ball
Silver medal – second place	2015 Toronto	Ribbon
Bronze medal – third place	2015 Toronto	Clubs

Jasmine "Jazzy" Kerber (born December 4, 1996) is a retired American individual rhythmic gymnast. She is the 2015 Pan American Games All-around silver medalist. At the National level, she is the 2014 US National champion and 2015, 2013, 2012 US National silver medalist.

== Personal life ==
Kerber was born to Mark Kerber and Karen Springen and has a younger sister named Gigi. Kerber began gymnastics at age 4, coincidentally after a trip to a local shopping mall where she saw her first rhythmic performance on what just happened to be National Gymnastics Day. She describes her gymnastics style as "less power and more balletic". Kerber attended public school at Highland Park High School and graduated in 2015. After taking 2015–2016 as a gap year to focus on her gymnastics, she is studying at Stanford. Kerber speaks English, Russian and French.

== Career ==
Kerber appeared in several international competitions in 2009. At the 2009 International Tournament of Calais she finished 3rd in all-around. Kerber has competed at the Junior World Cup series in 2009 and 2010.

Kerber made her senior debut season in 2012 when she competed at the 2012 Schmiden International, finishing 7th in all-around. In 2013, Kerber competed at the senior US Championships finishing 2nd in all-around behind Rebecca Sereda. She won bronze in all-around at the Calais de France and at the 2013 Schmiden International, as well as qualifying to all 4 event finals. Kerber competed in the 2013 World Cup series in Corbeil-Essonnes, France and finished 18th in all-around. Kerber appeared in her first Worlds at the 2013 World Championships in Kyiv, Ukraine where she qualified and finished 22nd in the all-around finals.

In 2014 season, Kerber competed at the World Cup series in Lisbon where she finished 12th in all-around. She finished 18th in all-around at the 2014 Stuttgart World Cup. Kerber won the all-around gold at the 2014 US Championships (tied with Rebecca Sereda), she then won the all-around gold at the 2014 Pan American Championships in Toronto, Canada. At the 2014 World Cup Final in Kazan, Russia, Kerber finished 13th in all-around ahead of Japan's Kaho Minagawa. On September 22–27, Kerber competed at the 2014 World Championships and finished 19th in the all-around finals behind Ukrainian gymnast Viktoria Mazur.

In 2015 season, Kerber competed at the Valentine Cup and finished 6th in the all-around. On March 27–29, Kerber competed at the 2015 Lisbon World Cup finishing 16th in the all-around. On April 10–12, Kerber finished last in 56th place in the all-around at the 2015 Pesaro World Cup after withdrawing from last 2 apparatus events. On May 8–10, she competed at Corbeil-Essonnes International Rhythmic Gymnastics Tournament and finished 5th in all-around, she qualified to 3 event finals and placed 4th in ball, 7th in hoop and 8th in ribbon. She won the all-around silver at the 2015 US National Championships behind Laura Zeng. At the 2015 Pan American Games, Kerber won the all-around silver medal behind Zeng, she qualified to all 4 apparatus finals taking silver in hoop, ball, ribbon and bronze in clubs. In August, Kerber finished 25th in the all-around at the 2015 Sofia World Cup. At the 2015 World Cup Final in Kazan, Kerber finished 30th in the all-around. On September 9–13, Kerber (together with teammates Laura Zeng, Camilla Feeley and Serena Lu) competed at the 2015 World Championships in Stuttgart, with Team USA finishing 9th. Kerber finished 39th in the All-around qualifications and did not advance into the Top 24 finals. She completed her career after Worlds and is pursuing her studies at Stanford University.

== Routine music information ==
Year	Apparatus	Music title
2014	Hoop	Sentimental Waltz, music from My Sweet and Tender Beast by Eugen Doga
2014	Ball	Sinyo by Desi Dobreva
2014	Clubs	Caprice No. 24 in A Minor, Op. 1, No. 24 by David Garrett
2014	Ribbon	Hijo De La Luna by Mecano
2013	Hoop	Sentimental Waltz, music from My Sweet and Tender Beast by Eugen Doga
2013	Ball	It ain't necessarily so by Bronski Beat
2013	Clubs	Overture, music from The Barber of Seville by London Philharmonic Orchestra and David Parry
2013	Ribbon	Mas Que Nada
2012	Hoop	Balada para Alessandro by Raul Di Blasio
2012	Ball	Mr. Pushkin Came To Shore by Combustible Edison
2012	Clubs	Overture, music from The Barber of Seville by London Philharmonic Orchestra and David Parry
2012	Ribbon	Mas que nada, music from Rio OST by Brasil '66 & Sergio Mendes
