= Coca-Cola Coliseum =

Arena in Toronto, Ontario, Canada

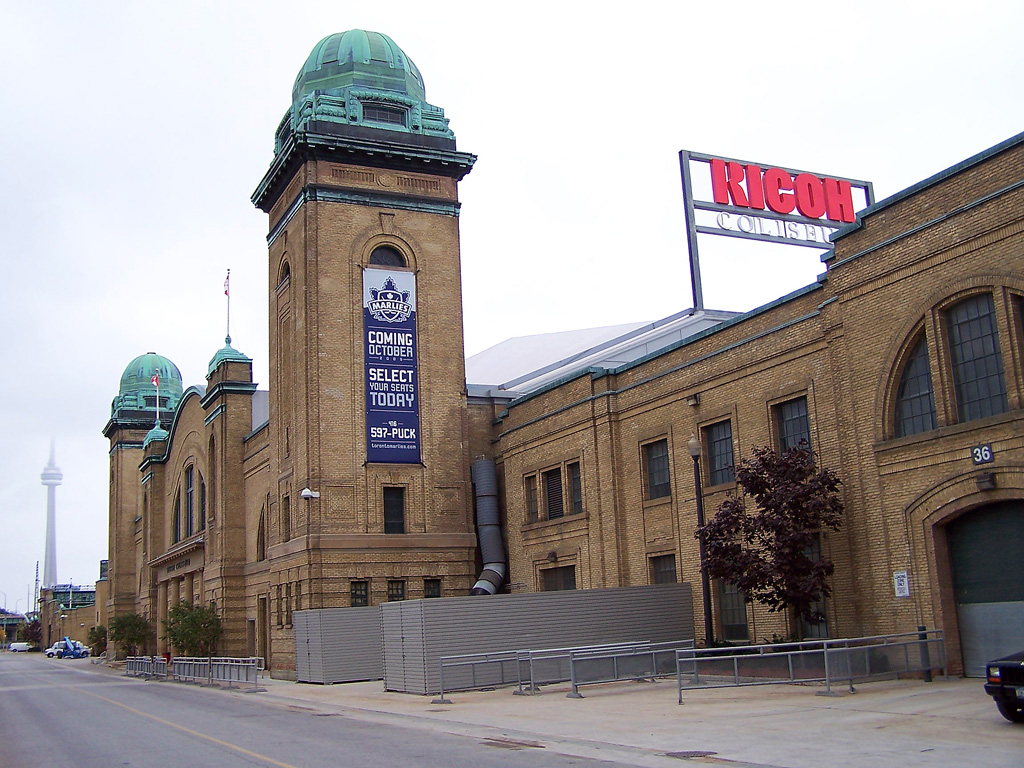
- The Coca-Cola Coliseum in 2005

- Location in Toronto Location in Ontario Location in Canada
- Former names: CNE Coliseum (1921–2003); Royal Coliseum; Ricoh Coliseum (2003–2018); Toronto Coliseum (July 2015)
- Address: 19 Nunavut Road
- Location: Toronto, Ontario, Canada
- Coordinates: 43°38′09″N 79°24′54″W
- Owner: City of Toronto
- Operator: Maple Leaf Sports & Entertainment
- Capacity: Centre Stage Mode: 9,250; Basketball: 8,500; Hockey: 8,140; Boxing/Wrestling: 7,600
- Public transit: at Exhibition; at Exhibition Loop

Construction
- Groundbreaking: 1920
- Opened: December 16, 1921
- Renovated: 1963, 1997, 2003
- Cost: CA$1 million $3 million (1963 renovation) $38 million (2003 renovation)
- Architects: George F.W. Price (original); Brisbin Brook Beynon, Architects (renovation)

Tenants
- Toronto-Buffalo Royals (WTT) (1974); Toronto Roadrunners (AHL) (2003–2004); Toronto Marlies (AHL) (2005–present); Toronto Triumph (LFL) (2011–2012); Toronto Sceptres (PWHL) (2024–present); Toronto Tempo (WNBA) (2026–present); Toronto North (WTT) (2026–present)

Website
- coca-colacoliseum.com

Coca-Cola Coliseum (also or formerly known as CNE Coliseum, Royal Coliseum, Ricoh Coliseum, Toronto Coliseum, or Coliseum) is an arena at Exhibition Place in Toronto, Ontario, Canada, used for agricultural displays, ice hockey, basketball, and trade shows. It was built for the Canadian National Exhibition (CNE) and the Royal Agricultural Winter Fair (the Royal) in 1921. Since 1997, it has been part of the Enercare Centre exhibition complex. It serves as the home arena of the Toronto Sceptres of the Professional Women's Hockey League and the American Hockey League's Toronto Marlies, the farm team of the Toronto Maple Leafs. It also serves as the home arena of the Toronto Tempo of the Women's National Basketball Association since their debut in 2026.

== History ==
On January 1, 1920, Toronto voters approved by plebiscite a proposal by the Royal Agricultural Fair Association to construct, at a maximum cost of CA$1 million, a new arena for livestock. The City of Toronto government (City) made a call for tenders in the fall of 1920 but the lowest tender was CA$1.9 million, exceeding the mandate approved by plebiscite. The size of the planned building was reduced by half in an attempt to get the cost under CA$1 million and a new call for tenders was done. The lowest tender received was from Anglin-Norcross Ltd. of Montreal for CA$892,000 to build the building to City Architect F. W. Price's specifications. There was a reticence to hire a Montreal firm, and the city held off on awarding the contract while Price sought out construction offers from local firms to do the work using day labour, although the legality of this was questioned. Another issue raised was that the revised arena design needed to be expanded to meet the fair's needs. Anglin-Norcross offered to do the work at a further CA$31,000. It took two City Council votes, but Council finally approved the awarding of the contract to Anglin-Norcross on May 26, 1921. Demolition of existing buildings (likely the area with livestock stalls) on the site commenced a few days later and arena work commenced in June 1921. The cornerstone was laid by Toronto Mayor Thomas Church on July 27, 1921. Robert Fleming, President of the Canadian National Exhibition (CNE) declared that the building would be the largest of its kind in the world, with a floor space of 8.5 acres (3.4 ha).

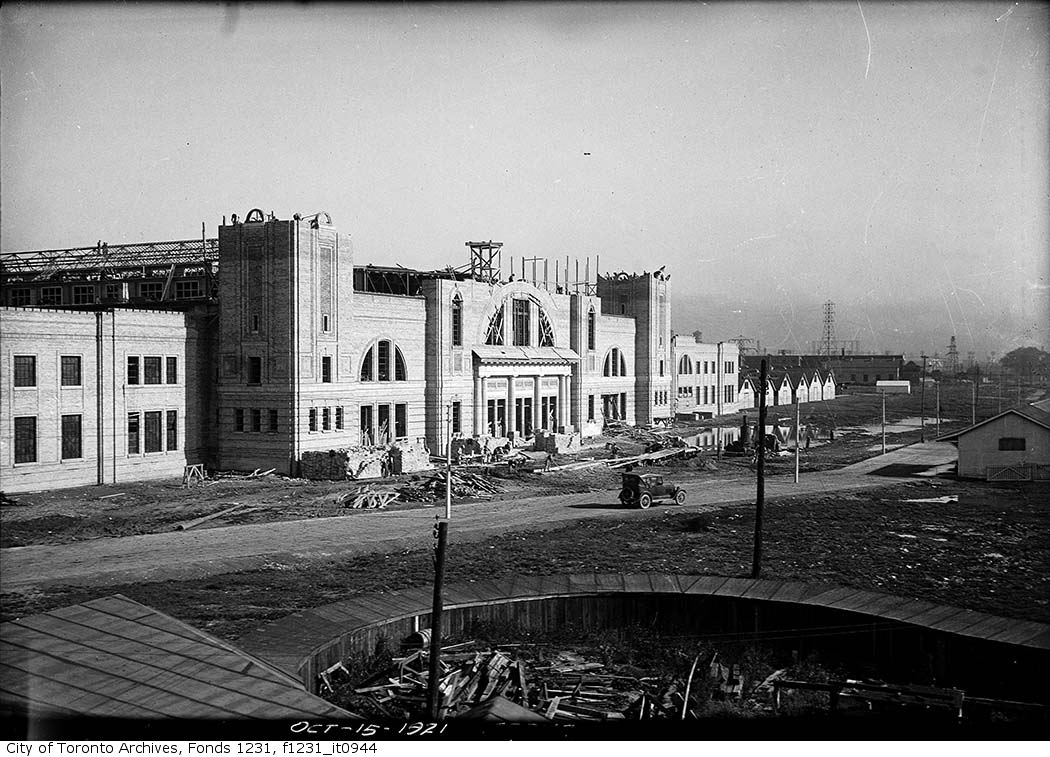
Construction of the arena in October 1921. The building was later opened in December 1921.

The Fair Association had hoped for the arena to be open by the fall of 1921 to inaugurate the new fair, but it was not ready. The CA$1 million (CA$14.4 million in 2025 dollars) building had its official public opening on December 16, 1921, attended by 5,000 persons to see an athletic meet put on by the "Sportsmen Patriotic Association." Upon completion, the building was billed as the largest of its kind in North America. The name "Coliseum" was given to the building in 1922, in time for the opening of the CNE. The main entrance was to the north, along Manitoba Drive. The southern side of the building was along the main TTC streetcar rail lines serving the CNE, which separated the Coliseum and Industry Buildings to the north, and the later Engineering and Electrical Building (1928) to the south. In 1926, additions were built and the complex was claimed to be the largest structure of its kind under one roof in the world. In 1931, the Horse Palace was built next door to provide a permanent building for the stables of the Winter Fair. From 1942 to 1945, the building was used as a training base for the Royal Canadian Air Force during World War II and known as the 'Manning Depot'. A photo of it as the RCAF Manning Depot is in the New Westminster Museum and Archives # IHP9562-003. After the war, it mainly hosted equestrian events for the Royal Agricultural Winter Fair, the CNE and other events. The arena was also used as a horse barn.

In time for the 1963 CNE, the southern facade was reconstructed. As part of the renovation, the southern facade was reclad with black, grey and white siding and a new front plaza was built, with a large "COLISEUM" sign on top. The CNE spent CA$3 million from 1960 until 1963 on "face-lifting" the Coliseum. In 1997, the National Trade Centre (now the Enercare Centre) exhibition complex was built. The new project removed the 1963 entrance and cladding, restoring the original facade, although the cupola towers on the southern facade had been removed in the 1963 renovation. Access to the Coliseum was moved to the western entrance of the exhibition complex through a hall known as Heritage Court.

In November 2002, the City of Toronto agreed to an extensive renovation of the Coliseum to attract a professional ice hockey team to the arena. At a cost of CA$38 million, the arena's capacity was expanded from 6,500 to 9,700 by building a new higher roof, lowering the floor, adding new seats in the expanded area and the installation of 38 private suites. Borealis Infrastructure contributed CA$9 million into the project up front and borrowed CA$20 million, in return for a 49-year lease to the arena. The City of Toronto invested CA$9 million and guaranteed Borealis' loans, while remaining the owner of the building. Borealis signed a 49-year sublease to the building with the Toronto Roadrunners for $9,500 per game. Borealis' loan was fully repaid in July 2025.

In 2003, Japanese office supply company Ricoh purchased the naming rights to the new facility for CA$10 million over ten years, with an optional five-year extension.

The Roadrunners' lease was terminated in June 2004, following their first season, for defaulting on its rent, and the team relocated to Edmonton.

In August 2004 Maple Leaf Sports & Entertainment agreed to a 20-year lease for the arena, with an option to extend the term for a further 10 years. Their lease called for rent to cover debt financing charges, property taxes and generate a return to the arena investors, exceeding $4 million annually. MLSE relocated their AHL farm team, which was renamed the Toronto Marlies, to the arena for the 2005-06 season. In 2023 the city approved amendments to MLSE's lease of the Coliseum including a 10 year extension starting in 2025, with an option for a further 10 year extension.

During the summer of 2015, a new scoreboard was installed at the Air Canada Centre, and the old scoreboard was installed at the Coliseum.

In 2018, MLSE announced that the Toronto Argonauts football operations offices and weight rooms would be relocated to the Coliseum in late June of that year. On July 11, 2018, at the end of Ricoh's partnership with the building, Coca-Cola purchased the naming rights to the facility for ten years, renaming it the "Coca-Cola Coliseum".

== Usage ==
Since November 1922, the Coliseum has been used by the Royal Agricultural Winter Fair held in November annually except during the years of World War II. The Fair uses the arena for the annual "Royal Horse Show" equestrian competition, as well as animal presentations.

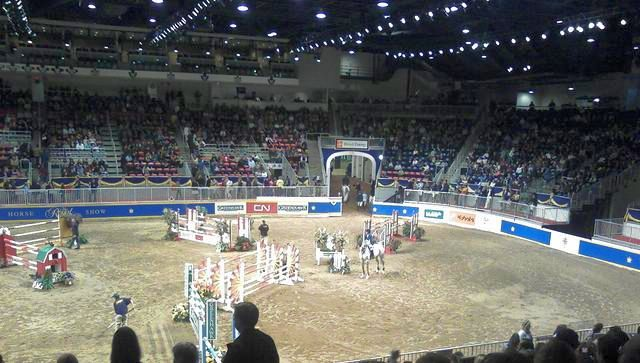
The Royal Horse Show during the Royal Agricultural Winter Fair, an event hosted by the Coliseum.

Each year in August, the Coliseum is used by the CNE for exhibits and performances. It has in the past been used for CNE cat, dog and horse shows. Until 2013, the CNE held the CNE Horse Show, a competitive event in the Coliseum. At one time run during the Ex, it changed to be a pre-CNE event in 2005. It has been used by the Royal Canadian Mounted Police Musical Ride. During the 2009, 2010 and 2011 CNE, it was used for a figure skating show.

The arena is also used for trade shows. The annual Boat Show builds an indoor pond over the arena floor.

=== Hockey ===
As early as the 1970s, plans were floated to outfit CNE Coliseum for ice hockey. When the World Hockey Association's Ottawa Nationals moved to Toronto as the Toronto Toros, they initially wanted to play at a renovated CNE Coliseum. However, due to objections from Maple Leafs vice president Bill Ballard, the Toros played at Varsity Arena before briefly becoming tenants of the Leafs at Maple Leaf Gardens.

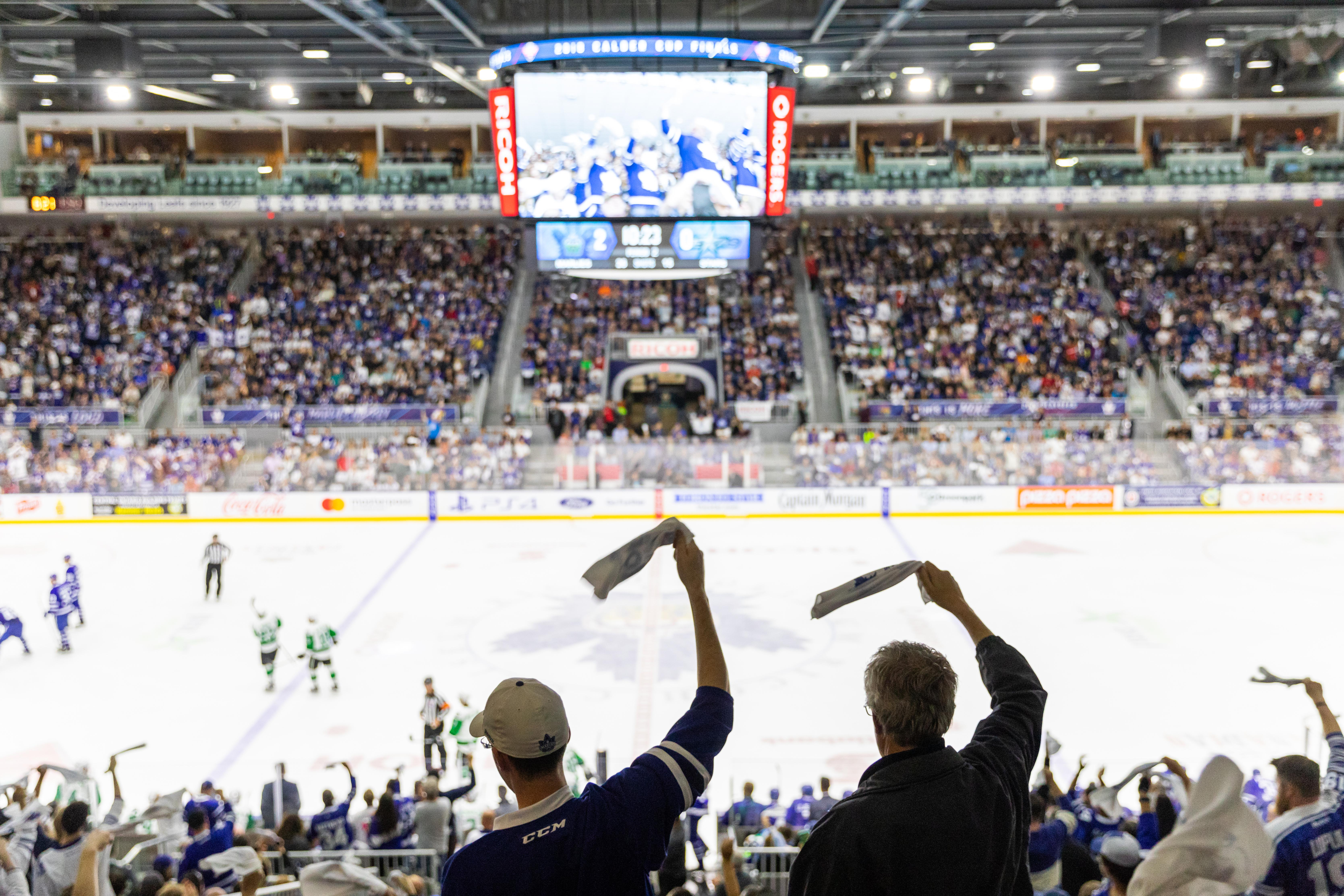
2018 Calder Cup Final between the Texas Stars and the Toronto Marlies. The arena was outfitted for ice hockey in the early 21st century.

In the early 2000s, there were efforts to bring a minor professional hockey team to the Coliseum. Plans to move the dormant Phoenix Roadrunners of the International Hockey League to Toronto for the 2002–2003 season fell apart when the league dissolved and six teams, but not the Roadrunners, were absorbed by the American Hockey League (AHL) in the summer of 2001. The same group then attempted to purchase the Louisville Panthers AHL franchise, which had suspended operations for the 2001–2002 season, and relocate it to the Coliseum, but the AHL voted against the transaction in December 2001. The Toronto Maple Leafs pressured the Hamilton Bulldogs, who held territorial rights to Toronto since it fell within their 50-mile home territory, to veto the transaction. The Leafs reportedly did not want the Coliseum to be upgraded as it would compete with their newly opened Air Canada Centre. Next, the group began pursuing the Bulldogs, which were owned by their NHL affiliate the Edmonton Oilers. The Bulldogs did not require league approval to move to Toronto since the Coliseum was within their territory. An agreement was reached with the Oilers to relocate the Bulldogs to Toronto, and to rename them the Toronto Roadrunners.

On November 1, 2003, the Coliseum made its debut as an ice hockey venue, when the Roadrunners tied the Rochester Americans 1-1. However, following their first season the Oilers chose to relocate the Roadrunners to Edmonton due to poor attendance and in anticipation of the impending NHL lockout, leaving the Coliseum without a hockey tenant.

In August 2004 Maple Leaf Sports & Entertainment announced that they would relocate their AHL farm team from St. John's, Newfoundland to Toronto to play in the Coliseum for the 2005–2006 season. The team, which was subsequently renamed the Toronto Marlies, debuted in their new home on October 12, 2005, with a 5–2 victory over the Syracuse Crunch, in front of a crowd of 8,056. The Coliseum hosted the 2007 AHL All-Star Game on January 29, 2007.

On October 27, 2021, the city of St. John's voted to evict the Newfoundland Growlers from their home arena of Mary Brown's Centre, citing workplace harassment of arena employees. The Growlers initially reached an agreement to relocate their first six home games to be at the Coca-Cola Coliseum in Toronto, however they subsequently came to an agreement with the nearby city of Conception Bay South to play games at their local arena.

On April 30, 2024, it was announced that the Toronto Sceptres of the Professional Women's Hockey League—which played most of its inaugural regular season out of Mattamy Athletic Centre—would host its playoff games at the Coliseum. The Sceptres hosted the first game of its first round series against the Minnesota Frost on May 8; the Sceptres won 4–0 in front of a sold-out crowd. On September 3, 2024, Coca-Cola Coliseum was officially announced as the Sceptres's primary venue for the 2024-25 PWHL season.

=== Other sports ===
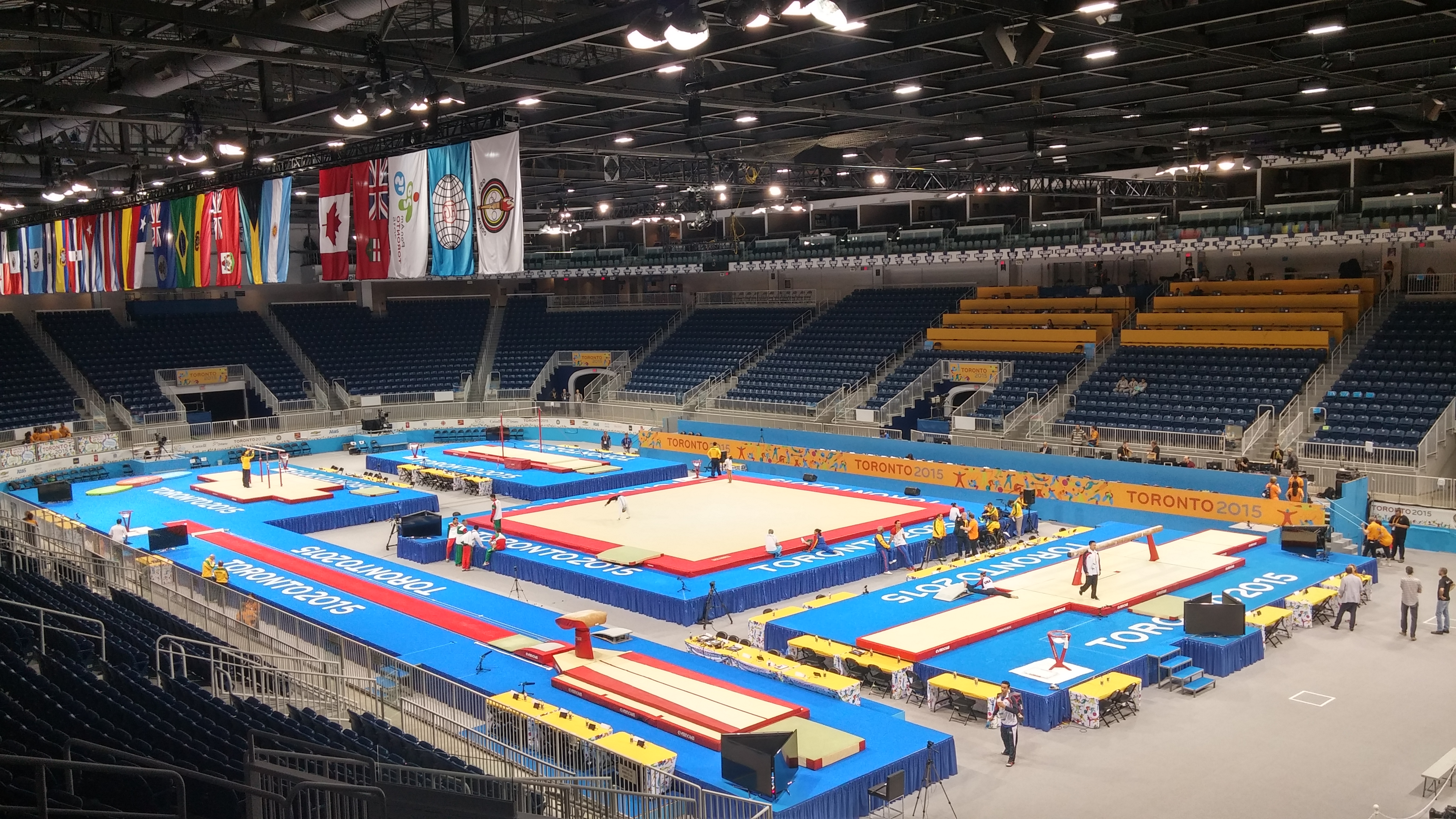
The Coliseum hosted the gymnastics competition for the 2015 Pan American Games.

- On April 4, 1922, it was the site of the Johnny Dundee vs Jimmy Goodrich boxing match promoted by Jack Corcoran that set a new indoor sports attendance record for Toronto with 11,900 spectators packed into the building. The mark would stand until the construction of Maple Leaf Gardens in 1931.
- In 1974, the Coliseum hosted half the home games for the Toronto-Buffalo Royals of World Team Tennis alongside the Buffalo Memorial Auditorium in Buffalo, New York for one season before the team was contracted by the league in 1975.
- The Coliseum hosted the Lingerie Football League's Toronto Triumph in their lone season in operation in 2012.
- From July 11 to 20, 2015, the Coliseum hosted the gymnastics competition of the 2015 Pan American Games, during which it was known as the "Toronto Coliseum."
- The Coliseum hosted the Longines World Cup Jumping (Equestrian) Championships in November 2015.
- The Coliseum hosted events as part of the 2016 NBA All-Star Weekend in Toronto over 2 days:
  - the 2016 NBA Celebrity All-Star Game on February 12, 2016.
  - the NBA All-Star open practice and NBA D-League All-Star Game on February 13, 2016.
- The Coliseum hosted the Canada-Netherlands Davis Cup tie September 14–16, 2018, which featured Daniel Nestor’s final competitive match.
- The Coliseum hosted Purdue vs. Alabama and Clemson vs. TCU men's college basketball games on Saturday, December 9, 2023 in the Hall of Fame Series.
- Starting in 2026, the Coliseum will be home to the Toronto Tempo of the WNBA.

=== Concerts ===
The Coliseum has been used for numerous musical concerts. Acts that have performed there include Playboi Carti, Lil Tecca, Jimi Hendrix, The Doors, The Who, Genesis, Bob Dylan, Vanilla Fudge, Mötley Crüe, G.E.M., Joker Xue, Hatsune Miku and Kraftwerk. From 1922 to 1934, the CNE's Canadian National Exhibition Chorus performed in the arena. In 2007, the Coliseum hosted the first We Day concert.

On 30 May 2025, Philippine pop group BINI performed in the coliseum as part of the Biniverse World Tour 2025.

=== Professional wrestling ===
In March 2016, the Coliseum hosted the WWE Network special Roadblock.

All Elite Wrestling (AEW) scheduled its first ever Canadian shows at the Coliseum, with a live broadcast of AEW Dynamite on October 12, 2022, and a taping of Rampage the following night.

== See also ==
- List of indoor arenas in Canada
- Venues of the 2015 Pan American and Parapan American Games
- List of music venues in Toronto
