= Israel at the European Games =

- IOC code: ISR
- NOC: Olympic Committee of Israel
- Website: www.olympicsil.co.il
- Medals Ranked 21st: Gold 5 Silver 7 Bronze 7 Total 19

European Games appearances (overview)
- 2015; 2019; 2023; 2027

Israel has competed in the European Games since they began in 2015. Their largest contingent of athletes ever sent to a sporting competition was the 2015 games, when 134 athletes were sent. Previously, Israel competed at Asian Games between 1954 and 1974.

== Medal tables ==
=== Medals by Games ===
Games	Athletes	Gold	Silver	Bronze	Total	Rank
(Azerbaijan) 2015 Baku	134	2	4	6	12	22
(Belarus) 2019 Minsk	32	3	3	1	7	19
(Poland) 2023 Kraków-Małopolska	141	1	1	3	5	34
(Turkey) 2027 Istanbul	Future event					
Total		6	8	10	24	29

=== Medals by sports ===
Sport	Gold	Silver	Bronze	Total
Gymnastics	2	4	2	8
Judo	1	2	1	4
Shooting	1	0	1	2
Swimming	1	0	1	2
Wrestling	0	1	0	1
Athletics	0	0	1	1
Badminton	0	0	1	1
Totals (7 entries)	5	7	7	19

== List of medallists ==
Games	Medal	Name(s)	Sport	Event
(Azerbaijan) 2015 Baku	Gold	Sagi Muki	Judo	Men's 73 kg
(Azerbaijan) 2015 Baku	Gold	Ziv Kaluntarov	Swimming	Men's 50 metre freestyle
(Azerbaijan) 2015 Baku	Silver	Or Sasson	Judo	Men's +100 kg
(Azerbaijan) 2015 Baku	Silver	Yuval Filo; Alona Koshevatskiy; Ekaterrina Levina; Karina Lykhvar; Ida Mayrin	Rhythmic gymnastics	Women's group clubs and hoops
(Azerbaijan) 2015 Baku	Silver	Yuval Filo; Alona Koshevatskiy; Ekaterrina Levina; Karina Lykhvar; Ida Mayrin	Rhythmic gymnastics	Women's group all-around
(Azerbaijan) 2015 Baku	Silver	Ilana Kratysh	Wrestling	Women's freestyle 69 kg
(Azerbaijan) 2015 Baku	Bronze	Mixed team: Haimro Alame Tomer Almogy Girmaw Amare Maya Aviezer Noa Barlia Etamar Bhastekar Amit Cohen Hai Cohen Aviv Dayan Olga Dogadgo Margaryta Dorozhon Alan Ferber Muket Fetene Dikla Goldenthal Amir Hamidulin Omri Harush Hanna Knyazyeva-Minenko Dmitry Kroytor Shanie Landen Olga Lenskiy Itamar Levi Danna Levin Alexandra Lokshin Dariya Lokshin Anastasya Muchkayev Noam Neeman Imri Persiado Margareta Pogorelov Donald Sanford Maor Seged Maaya Shahaf Itay Shamir Azaunt Taka Maor Tiyouri Gilron Tsabkevich Diana Vaisman Kristina Vanyushev Tom Yakubov Evgenia Zabolotni Victor Zagynayko Efat Zelikovich	Athletics	Team Championships
(Azerbaijan) 2015 Baku	Bronze	Yarden Gerbi	Judo	Women's 63 kg
(Azerbaijan) 2015 Baku	Bronze	Yuval Filo; Alona Koshevatskiy; Ekaterrina Levina; Karina Lykhvar; Ida Mayrin	Rhythmic gymnastics	Women's group ribons
(Azerbaijan) 2015 Baku	Bronze	Neta Rivkin	Rhythmic gymnastics	Women's rhythmic individual hoop
(Azerbaijan) 2015 Baku	Bronze	Sergey Richter	Shooting	Men's 10m Air Rifle
(Azerbaijan) 2015 Baku	Bronze	Marc Hinawi	Swimming	Men's 1500m Freestyle
(Belarus) 2019 Minsk	Gold	Linoy Ashram	Rhythmic gymnastics	Individual ball
(Belarus) 2019 Minsk	Gold	Linoy Ashram	Rhythmic gymnastics	Individual clubs
(Belarus) 2019 Minsk	Gold	Sergey Rikhter	Shooting	Men's 10m air rifle
(Belarus) 2019 Minsk	Silver	Linoy Ashram	Rhythmic gymnastics	Individual all-around
(Belarus) 2019 Minsk	Silver	Linoy Ashram	Rhythmic gymnastics	Individual ribbon
(Belarus) 2019 Minsk	Silver	Li Kochman	Judo	Men's -90 kg
(Belarus) 2019 Minsk	Bronze	Misha Zilberman	Badminton	Men's singles

== Flag bearers ==
Games	Opening ceremonies	Closing ceremonies
2015 Baku	Alexander Shatilov	Ziv Kalontarov
2019 Minsk	Misha Zilberman	Andrey Medvedev
