= Gymnastics at the 2015 European Games – Women's rhythmic group all-around =

Women's rhythmic group all-around at the 2015 European Games
- Venue: National Gymnastics Arena
- Dates: 17 June
- Competitors: 71 from 13 nations
- Winning score: 35.300

Medalists
gold medal	Diana Borisova; Daria Kleshcheva; Anastasia Maksimova; Anastasiia Tatareva; Maria Tolkacheva; Sofya Skomorokh	Russia
silver medal	Yuval Filo; Alona Koshevatskiy; Ekaterina Levina; Karina Lykhvar; Ida Mayrin	Israel
bronze medal	Ksenya Cheldishkina; Hanna Dudzenkova; Maria Kadobina; Aliaksandra Narkevich; Valeriya Pischelina; Arina Tsitsilina	Belarus

The women's rhythmic gymnastics group all-around competition at the 2015 European Games was held at the National Gymnastics Arena, Baku on 17 June 2015.

== Results ==
Rank	Gymnast	Nation	5	3 + 2	Total
1st place, gold medalist(s)	Diana Borisova; Daria Kleshcheva; Anastasia Maksimova; Anastasiia Tatareva; Maria Tolkacheva; Sofya Skomorokh	Russia	18.000 (1)	17.300 (4)	35.300
2nd place, silver medalist(s)	Yuval Filo; Alona Koshevatskiy; Ekaterina Levina; Karina Lykhvar; Ida Mayrin	Israel	17.350 (2)	17.700 (2)	35.050
3rd place, bronze medalist(s)	Ksenya Cheldishkina; Hanna Dudzenkova; Maria Kadobina; Aliaksandra Narkevich; Valeriya Pischelina; Arina Tsitsilina	Belarus	16.950 (7)	17.900 (1)	34.850
4	Sandra Aguilar; Artemi Gavezou; Elena López; Lourdes Mohedano; Alejandra Quereda; Lidia Redondo	Spain	17.350 (2)	16.900 (7)	34.250
5	Reneta Kamberova; Mihaela Maevska-Velichkova; Tsvetelina Naydenova; Tsvetelina Stoyanova; Hristiana Todorova	Bulgaria	16.650 (9)	17.500 (3)	34.150
6	Olena Dmytrash; Yevgeniya Gomon; Oleksandra Gridasova; Valeriia Gudym; Anastasiya Voznyak	Ukraine	17.050 (4)	17.100 (5)	34.150
7	Martina Centofanti; Sofia Lodi; Alessia Maurelli; Camilla Patriarca; Marta Pagnini; Andreea Stefanescu	Italy	17.000 (5)	17.000 (6)	34.000
8	Natalie Hermann; Anastasija Khmelnytska; Daniela Potapova; Dara Sajfutdinova; Sina Tkaltschewitsch; Rana Tokmak	Germany	16.950 (6)	16.100 (9)	33.050
9	Sabina Abbasova; Diana Doman; Aynur Mustafayeva; Aleksandra Platonova; Siyana Vasileva	Azerbaijan	16.700 (8)	15.450 (11)	32.150
10	Samantha Ay; Noémie Balthazard; Elena Chabert; Océane Charoy; Léa Peinoit	France	16.300 (10)	14.950 (13)	31.250
11	Sonja Kokkonen; Heleri Kolkkanen; Elina Koprinen; Iina Linna; Aino Purje; Kati Rantsi	Finland	14.900 (13)	16.350 (8)	31.250
12	Eleni Doika; Zoi Kontogianni; Michaela Metallidou; Stavroula Samara; Erato Theopistou	Greece	15.150 (12)	15.700 (10)	30.850
13	Gina Dünser; Stephanie Kälin; Julia Novak; Tamara Stanisic; Nicole Turuani	Switzerland	15.500 (11)	14.950 (12)	30.450
