= Israel at the 2015 European Games =

- IOC code: ISR
- NOC: Olympic Committee of Israel
- Website: www.olympicsil.co.il

in Baku, Azerbaijan
- Competitors: 134 in 20 sports
- Flag bearers: Opening – Alexander Shatilov; Closing – Ziv Kalontarov
- Medals Ranked 22nd: Gold 2 Silver 4 Bronze 6 Total 12

European Games appearances (overview)
- 2015; 2019; 2023; 2027

Israel competed at the 2015 European Games, in Baku, Azerbaijan from 12 to 28 June 2015. The 2015 European Games represents Israel's largest ever delegation to a sports competition. Prior to the start of the event Israel planned to send 141 athletes to the games.

Winners of Olympic competitions such as triathlon, table tennis and shooting competitions will automatically qualify for the 2016 Summer Olympics. Israel will also participate in three of the five non-Olympic events, including 3×3 basketball and the sambo.

Israel finished the games with 12 medals in total and 2 athletes qualifying for the 2016 Summer Olympics.

== TV broadcasting ==
International Sports Broadcasting (ISB) will be the host broadcaster of the European Games. During the Games, ISB will produce approximately 6 hours of coverage per day. In Israel the games were broadcast on Sport 5 and Sport 1.

== Medalists ==
At the closing of the games Israel had won twelve medals, two gold, four silver and six bronze, ranking them 22nd overall.

Medal	Name	Sport	Event	Date
Gold	Sagi Muki	Judo	Men's 73 kg	26 June
Gold	Ziv Kaluntarov	Swimming	Men's 50 metre freestyle	27 June
Silver	Ilana Kratysh	Wrestling	Women's freestyle 69 kg	15 June
Silver	Yuval Filo; Alona Koshevatskiy; Ekaterrina Levina; Karina Lykhvar; Ida Mayrin	Rhythmic gymnastics	Women's group all-around	17 June
Silver	Yuval Filo; Alona Koshevatskiy; Ekaterrina Levina; Karina Lykhvar; Ida Mayrin	Rhythmic gymnastics	Women's group clubs and hoops	21 June
Silver	Or Sasson	Judo	Men's +100 kg	27 June
Bronze	Yarden Gerbi	Judo	Women's 63 kg	15 June
Bronze	Sergey Richter	Shooting	Men's 10m Air Rifle	16 June
Bronze	Yuval Filo; Alona Koshevatskiy; Ekaterrina Levina; Karina Lykhvar; Ida Mayrin	Rhythmic gymnastics	Women's group ribons	21 June
Bronze	Neta Rivkin	Rhythmic gymnastics	Women's rhythmic individual hoop	21 June
Bronze	Mixed team: Haimro Alame Tomer Almogy Girmaw Amare Maya Aviezer Noa Barlia Etamar Bhastekar Amit Cohen Hai Cohen Aviv Dayan Olga Dogadgo Margaryta Dorozhon Alan Ferber Muket Fetene Dikla Goldenthal Amir Hamidulin Omri Harush Hanna Knyazyeva-Minenko Dmitry Kroytor Shanie Landen Olga Lenskiy Itamar Levi Danna Levin Alexandra Lokshin Dariya Lokshin Anastasya Muchkayev Noam Neeman Imri Persiado Margareta Pogorelov Donald Sanford Maor Seged Maaya Shahaf Itay Shamir Azaunt Taka Maor Tiyouri Gilron Tsabkevich Diana Vaisman Kristina Vanyushev Tom Yakubov Evgenia Zabolotni Victor Zagynayko Efat Zelikovich	Athletics	Team Championships	23 June
Bronze	Marc Hinawi	Swimming	Men's 1500m Freestyle	24 June

== Competitors ==
The Israeli delegation included 134 athletes competing in 20 sports.

Sport	Men	Women	Total
Archery	1	0	1
Athletics	19	18	37
Badminton	1	0	1
Basketball (3×3)	4	4	8
Beach volleyball	2	0	2
Boxing	4	0	4
Cycling	3	1	4
Fencing	2	2	4
Gymnastics	1	11	12
Judo	9	9	18
Sambo	0	1	1
Shooting	5	0	5
Swimming	11	1	12
Synchronised Swimming	0	2	2
Taekwondo	1	0	1
Triathlon	2	1	3
Water Polo	0	13	13
Wrestling	5	1	6
Total	70	64	134

== Archery ==
Athlete	Event	Ranking round		Round of 64	Round of 32	Round of 16	Quarterfinals	Semifinals	Final / BM		Ref
Athlete	Event	Score	Seed	Opposition Score	Opposition Score	Opposition Score	Opposition Score	Opposition Score	Opposition Score	Rank	Ref
Guy Matzkin	Men's individual	631	51	Mihalic (Croatia); L 2–6	Did not advance					33	

== Athletics ==
In total Israel is sending 43 people to compete in Athletics competitions. This includes 23 men and 20 women.

At the conclusion of each event points were added to a nation's total based on the competitors placement. Points were combined to produce national team totals, and games medals were awarded to the top three nations. Medals were not awarded for individual events. At the conclusion of the 40 athletic events, Israel accumulated 430 total points, giving them the bronze medal.

Gender	Participant	Event	Round	Mark	Place	Ref
Men's	Imri Persiado	100 metres	Heat 2	10.78	5th place	
Men's	Imri Persiado	200 metres	Heat 2	21.30	3rd place	
Men's	Maor Seged	400 metre hurdles	Heat 2	52.18	3rd place	
Men's	Muket Fetene	800 metres		1:52.60	5th place	
Men's	Donald Blair Sanford	400 metres	Heat 2	45.75	1st place	
Men's	Haimro Alame	5000 metres		14:38.96	3rd place	
Men's	Girmaw Amare	1500 metres		3:55.47	6th place	
Men's	Girmaw Amare	3000 metres		8:26.07	6th place	
Men's	Noam Neeman	3000 metres steeplechase		9:13.64	4th place	
Men's	Itamar Levi	Shot put		17.23	7th place	
Men's	Itamar Levi	Discus throw		50.13	4th place	
Men's	Victor Zagynayko	Hammer throw		56.14	6th place	
Men's	Gilron Tsabkevich	Long jump		7.16	4th place	
Men's	Tom Yakubov	Triple jump		15.87	3rd place	
Men's	Dmitry Kroytor	High jump		2.20	3rd place	
Men's	Etamar Bhastekar	Pole vault		5.00	3rd place	
Men's	Tomer Almogy	110 metres hurdles	Heat 2	14.66	5th place	
Men's	Alan Ferber	Javelin throw		70.18	3rd place	
Men's	Amir Hamidulin; Aviv Dayan; Amit Cohen; Imri Persiado	4 × 100 metre relay	Heat 2	40.25	1st place	
Men's	Donald Blair Sanford; Aviv Dayan; Maor Seged; Hai Cohen	4 × 400 metre relay	Heat 2	3:11.09	3rd place	

Gender	Participant	Event	Round	Mark	Place	Ref
Women's	Olga Lenskiy	100 metres	Heat 2	11.61	1st place	
Women's	Olga Lenskiy	200 metres	Heat 2	23.40	1st place	
Women's	Efat Zelikovich	Long jump		No mark	13th place	
Women's	Shanie Landen	800 metres		2:10.36	8th place	
Women's	Dariya Lokshin	400 metres	Heat 2	56.84	7th place	
Women's	Maor Tiyouri	3000 metres		9:32.11	2nd place	
Women's	Maor Tiyouri	1500 metres		4:26.86	2nd place	
Women's	Danna Levin	3000 metres steeplechase		11:02.57	4th place	
Women's	Alexsandra Lokshin	400 metres hurdles	Heat 2	1:01.58	5th place	
Women's	Evgenia Zabolotni-Zagynayko	Hammer throw		55.87	4th place	
Women's	Anastasiya Muchkayev	Discus throw		48.81	4th place	
Women's	Anastasiya Muchkayev	Shot put		14.30	3rd place	
Women's	Margaryta Dorozhon	Javelin throw		58.00	1st place	
Women's	Maayan Shahaf	High jump		1.84	3rd place	
Women's	Hanna Knyazyeva-Minenko	Triple jump		14.41	1st place	
Women's	Olga Dogadko Bronshtein	Pole vault		3.70	3rd place	
Women's	Maya Aviezer	100 metres hurdles	Heat 2	14.21	5th place	
Women's	Azaunt Taka	5000 metres		17:29.30	6th place	
Women's	Dikla Goldenthal; Olga Lenskiy; Diana Vaisman; Efat Zelikovich	4 × 100 metre relay	Heat 2	45.23	2nd place	
Women's	Alexsandra Lokshin; Dariya Lokshin; Margareta Pogorelov; Shanie Landen	4 × 400 metre relay	Heat 2	Disqualified		

== Badminton ==
Men

Athlete	Event	Group stage (Group B)				Round of 16	Quarterfinal	Semifinal	Final / BM	
Athlete	Event	Opposition Score	Opposition Score	Opposition Score	Rank	Opposition Score	Opposition Score	Opposition Score	Opposition Score	Rank
Misha Zilberman	Singles	Rzayev (AZE); W 21–5, 21–3	Maddaloni (ITA); W 21–12, 21–15	Cali (MLT); W 21–3, 21–4	1 Q	Đurkinjak (CRO); L 21–13, 18–21, 11–21	Did not advance			9

== Basketball 3×3 ==
Basketball at the 2015 European games took place in the half-court 3x3 format.

Gender	Participants	Round	Opponent	Score	Place	Ref
Men's	Vladi Ermichin; Amit Simhon; Yoad Bet Yosef; Ofir Huber	Preliminary	Slovenia	Lost 16–7		
Men's	Vladi Ermichin; Amit Simhon; Yoad Bet Yosef; Ofir Huber	Preliminary	Lithuania	Lost 12–19		
Men's	Vladi Ermichin; Amit Simhon; Yoad Bet Yosef; Ofir Huber	Preliminary	Romania	Lost 16–21		
Men's	Vladi Ermichin; Amit Simhon; Yoad Bet Yosef; Ofir Huber	Round of 16	Azerbaijan	Lost 14–19		
Women's	Limor Peleg; Nofar Shalom; Maya Isseroff; Hadar Gutin	Preliminary	Russia	Lost 21–5		
Women's	Limor Peleg; Nofar Shalom; Maya Isseroff; Hadar Gutin	Preliminary	Lithuania	Lost 9–18		
Women's	Limor Peleg; Nofar Shalom; Maya Isseroff; Hadar Gutin	Preliminary	Romania	Lost 9–21		
Women's	Limor Peleg; Nofar Shalom; Maya Isseroff; Hadar Gutin	Round of 16	Switzerland	Lost 14–7		

== Beach volleyball ==
Gender	Participants	Round	Opponent	Result	Place	Ref
Men's	Sean Faiga; Ariel Hilman	Preliminary; Group E	Turkey	Won 2–0	1st place	
Men's	Sean Faiga; Ariel Hilman	Preliminary; Group E	Netherlands	Lost 0–2	1st place	
Men's	Sean Faiga; Ariel Hilman	Preliminary; Group E	Czech Republic	Won 2–1	1st place	
Men's	Sean Faiga; Ariel Hilman	Elimination	BYE			
Men's	Sean Faiga; Ariel Hilman	Round of 16	Latvia	Won 2–0		
Men's	Sean Faiga; Ariel Hilman	Quarterfinals	Latvia	Lost 0–2		

== Boxing ==
Gender	Event	Participant	Round	Score	Place	Ref
Men's	Light (60 kg)	Igor Lazarev	Round of 32	Lost 0–2		
Men's	Super Heavy (+91 kg)	Abdala Kadan	Round of 32	Lost 0–3		
Men's	Light Fly (46 – 49 kg)	David Alaverdian	Round of 16	Won 3–0		
Men's	Light Fly (46 – 49 kg)	David Alaverdian	Quarterfinals	Lost 0–3		
Men's	Middle (75 kg)	Artem Masliy	Round of 16	Lost 0–3		

== Cycling ==
=== Mountain Bike ===
Gender	Event	Participant	Round	Time	Place	Ref
Men's	Cross-country	Shlomi Haimy	Final	1:49:18	18th place	

=== Road Cycling ===
Gender	Event	Participant	Round	Time	Place	Ref
Men's	Road race	Yoav Bear	Final	did not finish		
Men's	Road race	Ido Itzhak Zilberstein	Final	did not finish		
Women's	Road race	Paz Bash	Final	3:25:57	28th place	

== Fencing ==
Gender	Participant	Event	Round	Score	Result	Ref
Men's	Ido Herpe	Individual épée	Pool round	Won 3–2	Qualified	
Men's	Ido Herpe	Individual épée	Pool round	Lost 4–5	Qualified	
Men's	Ido Herpe	Individual épée	Pool round	Won 5–3	Qualified	
Men's	Ido Herpe	Individual épée	Pool round	Won 5–1	Qualified	
Men's	Ido Herpe	Individual épée	Pool round	Lost 5–3	Qualified	
Men's	Ido Herpe	Individual épée	Pool round	Lost 2–3	Qualified	
Men's	Ido Herpe	Individual épée	Round of 32	Lost 14–15	Did not advance	
Men's	Tomer Or	Individual foil	Pool round	Lost 4–5	Advanced	
Men's	Tomer Or	Individual foil	Pool round	Lost 3–5	Advanced	
Men's	Tomer Or	Individual foil	Pool round	Won 5–0	Advanced	
Men's	Tomer Or	Individual foil	Pool round	Lost 1–5	Advanced	
Men's	Tomer Or	Individual foil	Pool round	Won 5–2	Advanced	
Men's	Tomer Or	Individual foil	Round of 32	Lost 12–15	Did not advance	
Women's	Delila Hatuel	Individual foil	Pool round	Won 5–2	Qualified	
Women's	Delila Hatuel	Individual foil	Pool round	Won 5–3	Qualified	
Women's	Delila Hatuel	Individual foil	Pool round	Won 5–4	Qualified	
Women's	Delila Hatuel	Individual foil	Pool round	Lost 3–4	Qualified	
Women's	Delila Hatuel	Individual foil	Pool round	Lost 4–5	Qualified	
Women's	Delila Hatuel	Individual foil	Round of 32	Won 15–14	Advanced	
Women's	Delila Hatuel	Individual foil	Round of 16	Lost 8–15	Did not advance	
Women's	Avital Marinuk	Individual épée	Pool round	Won 5–2	9th place	
Women's	Avital Marinuk	Individual épée	Pool round	Lost 2–5	9th place	
Women's	Avital Marinuk	Individual épée	Pool round	Won 5–4	9th place	
Women's	Avital Marinuk	Individual épée	Pool round	Won 5–2	9th place	
Women's	Avital Marinuk	Individual épée	Pool round	Lost 4–5	9th place	
Women's	Avital Marinuk	Individual épée	Pool round	Lost 2–5	9th place	
Women's	Avital Marinuk	Individual épée	Round of 32	Lost 9–15		

== Gymnastics ==
=== Acrobatic ===
Women's groups

Athlete	Event	Exercise			Total	Rank
Athlete	Event	Balance	Dynamic	Combined	Total	Rank
May Miller; Avia Brener; Shoval Sofer	Women's group all-around	25.780 (9)	26.910 (8) R2	24.220	76.910	10
May Miller; Avia Brener; Shoval Sofer	Women's group balance	—N/a			Did not advance	
May Miller; Avia Brener; Shoval Sofer	Women's group dynamic	—N/a			Did not advance	

=== Artistic ===
Men
All-Around

Athlete	Event	Qualification								Final							
Athlete	Event	Apparatus						Total	Rank	Apparatus						Total	Rank
Athlete	Event	F	PH	R	V	PB	HB	Total	Rank	F	PH	R	V	PB	HB	Total	Rank
Alexander Shatilov	All-around	15.166 Q	14.100	12.733	14.200	14.366	13.400	83.965 Q	16	14.166	14.300	13.533	14.133	13.933	14.566	84.631	7

Apparatus

Athlete	Event	Final	
Athlete	Event	Score	Rank
Alexander Shatilov	Floor Exercise	14.833	5

Women
All-Around

Athlete	Event	Qualification						Final					
Athlete	Event	Apparatus				Total	Rank	Apparatus				Total	Rank
Athlete	Event	F	V	UB	BB	Total	Rank	F	V	UB	BB	Total	Rank
Tzuf Feldon	All-around	12.200	13.000	12.133	12.966	50.299	37	11.900	12.800	11.966	12.933	49.599	17

=== Rhythmic ===
Israel has qualified two athletes after their performance at the 2013 Rhythmic Gymnastics European Championships.

Gender	Participant(s)	Style	Round	Score	Place	Result	Ref
Women's	Yuval Filo; Alona Koshevatskiy; Ekaterrina Levina; Karina Lykhvar; Ida Mayrin	Group – Ribbon	Qualifier	17.350	2nd place	Qualified	
Women's	Yuval Filo; Alona Koshevatskiy; Ekaterrina Levina; Karina Lykhvar; Ida Mayrin	Group – Ribbon	Final	17.100	Bronze		
Women's	Yuval Filo; Alona Koshevatskiy; Ekaterrina Levina; Karina Lykhvar; Ida Mayrin	Group – Clubs & Hoops	Qualifier	17.700	2nd place	Qualified	
Women's	Yuval Filo; Alona Koshevatskiy; Ekaterrina Levina; Karina Lykhvar; Ida Mayrin	Group – Clubs & Hoops	Final	17.500	Silver		
Women's	Yuval Filo; Alona Koshevatskiy; Ekaterrina Levina; Karina Lykhvar; Ida Mayrin	Group – All-Around	Final	35.050	Silver		
Women's	Neta Rivkin	Individual – Ribbon	Qualifier	18.050	5th place	Qualified	
Women's	Neta Rivkin	Individual – Ribbon	Final	17.400	6th place		
Women's	Neta Rivkin	Individual – Club	Qualifier	15.900	20th place	Did not qualify	
Women's	Neta Rivkin	Individual – Ball	Qualifier	18.050	5th place	Qualified	
Women's	Neta Rivkin	Individual – Ball	Final	17.950	5th place		
Women's	Neta Rivkin	Individual – Hoop	Qualifier	17.800	8th place	Qualified	
Women's	Neta Rivkin	Individual – Hoop	Final	18.150	Bronze		
Women's	Neta Rivkin	Individual – All-Around	Final	69.800	9th place		
Women's	Victoria Veinberg Filanovsky	Individual – Ribbon	Qualifier	17.300	12th place	Did not qualify	
Women's	Victoria Veinberg Filanovsky	Individual – Club	Qualifier	17.300	9th place	Reserve 1	
Women's	Victoria Veinberg Filanovsky	Individual – Ball	Qualifier	17.250	13th place	Did not qualify	
Women's	Victoria Veinberg Filanovsky	Individual – Hoop	Qualifier	17.700	10th place	Did not qualify	
Women's	Victoria Veinberg Filanovsky	Individual – All-Around	Final	69.550	10th place		

== Judo ==
Gender	Participant	Event	Round	Result	Place	Ref
Men's	Artiom Arshansky	60 kg	Round of 32	Won 0–100; 0:09(IPP)		
Men's	Artiom Arshansky	60 kg	Round of 16	Lost 0s1-0s3 5:00(PEN)		
Men's	Alon Rahima	60 kg	Round of 32	Lost 111s1-0 4:16 (IPP)		
Men's	Golan Pollack	66 kg	Round of 32	Won 10s3-1s2 5:00 (WAZ)		
Men's	Golan Pollack	66 kg	Round of 16	Won 10s3-1s2 5:00 (WAZ)		
Men's	Baruch Shmailov	66 kg	Round of 32	Won 0s1-1s2 5:00 (YUK)		
Men's	Baruch Shmailov	66 kg	Round of 16	Lost 0s2-100s1 2:40 (IPP)		
Men's	Sagi Aharon Muki	73 kg	Round of 64	BYE		
Men's	Sagi Aharon Muki	73 kg	Round of 32	Won 100–0; 0:29 (IPP)		
Men's	Sagi Aharon Muki	73 kg	Round of 16	Won 100-0s1 1:39 (IPP)		
Men's	Sagi Aharon Muki	73 kg	Quarterfinals	Won 0s3-0s2 5:00(PEN)		
Men's	Sagi Aharon Muki	73 kg	Semifinals	Won 0s2-100s1 1:47(IPP)		
Men's	Sagi Aharon Muki	73 kg	Finals	Won 100s2-0s3 4:33 (IPP)	Gold	
Men's	Asaf Moshe Chen	81 kg	Round of 64	BYE		
Men's	Asaf Moshe Chen	81 kg	Round of 32	Won 100s2-0s2		
Men's	Asaf Moshe Chen	81 kg	Round of 16	Lost 0s1-2s3		
Men's	Alon Sasson	90 kg	Round of 64	BYE		
Men's	Alon Sasson	90 kg	Round of 32	Lost 0s1-112s2 3:26 (IPP)		
Men's	Peter Paltchik	100 kg	Round of 32	Won 112-0s2 2:07 (IPP)		
Men's	Peter Paltchik	100 kg	Round of 16	Lost 0–100; 1:13 (IPP)		
Men's	Or Sasson	+100 kg	Round of 32	Won 1s1-0s2 5:00 (YUK)		
Men's	Or Sasson	+100 kg	Round of 16	Won 100s2-0s1 3:54 (IPP)		
Men's	Or Sasson	+100 kg	Quarterfinals	Won 100s1-0 1:56 (IPP)		
Men's	Or Sasson	+100 kg	Semifinals	Won 100a1-a 2:44 (IPP)		
Men's	Or Sasson	+100 kg	Finals	Lost 0s1-100s2 2:40 (IPP)	Silver	

Gender	Participant	Event	Round	Result	Place	Ref
Women's	Shira Rishony	48 kg	Round of 32	Lost 0-1s1 4:00 (YUK)		
Women's	Noa Minsker	48 kg	Round of 32	BYE		
Women's	Noa Minsker	48 kg	Round of 16	Lost 0–100; 1:53 (IPP)		
Women's	Gili Cohen	52 kg	Round of 32	BYE		
Women's	Gili Cohen	52 kg	Round of 16	Lost 100s1-0s1 2:44 (IPP)		
Women's	Roni Schwartz	52 kg	Round of 32	Won 100–0; 2:36 (IPP)		
Women's	Roni Schwartz	52 kg	Round of 16	Lost 1s1-101 3:13 (IPP)		
Women's	Camila Satie Zyman Minagawa	57 kg	Round of 32	Won 100–0; 0:50 (IPP)		
Women's	Camila Satie Zyman Minagawa	57 kg	Round of 16	Lost 0s1-1s1 4:00 (YUK)		
Women's	Yarden Gerbi	63 kg	Round of 32	BYE		
Women's	Yarden Gerbi	63 kg	Round of 16	Won 0s1-0s3 4:00 (PEN)		
Women's	Yarden Gerbi	63 kg	Quarterfinals	Won 1s2-0s2 4:00 (YUK)		
Women's	Yarden Gerbi	63 kg	Semifinals	Lost 0s1-100 2:59 (IPP)		
Women's	Yarden Gerbi	63 kg	Bronze medal Finals	Won 1s1-0 4:00(YUK)	Bronze	
Women's	Rotem Shor	63 kg	Round of 32	Lost 0s1-1s2 4:00(YUK)		
Women's	Lior Wildikan Samar	70 kg	Round of 32	Won 1-0s1 4:00(YUK)		
Women's	Lior Wildikan Samar	70 kg	Round of 16	Lost 0-100s1 2:33 (IPP)		
Women's	Linda Bolder	70 kg	Round of 32	Lost 0-11s3 4:00 (WAZ)		

== Sambo ==
Gender	Participant	Event	Round	Result	Place	Ref
Women's	Kahal Shafrir	60 kg	Quarterfinal	Lost 0–4		

== Shooting ==
Gender	Participant	Event	Round	Score	Place	Ref
Men's	Sergey Richter	10m Air Rifle	Qualification	628.7	Bronze	
Men's	Sergey Richter	10m Air Rifle	Final	185.5	Bronze	
Men's	Leor Ovadia Madlal	10m Air Rifle	Qualification	618.7	29th place	
Men's	Leor Ovadia Madlal	50m Rifle Prone	Qualification	610.0	29th place	
Men's	Leor Ovadia Madlal	50m Rifle 3 Positions	Qualification	1126	33rd place	
Men's	Guy Zeev Starik	50m Rifle Prone	Qualification	617.1	4th place	
Men's	Guy Zeev Starik	50m Rifle Prone	Final	122.5	6th place	
Men's	Immanuel Yosef Ben Hefer	50m Rifle 3 Positions	Qualification	1138	25th place	
Men's	Alexei Kiriyevski	25m Rapid fire pistol	Qualification; Stage 1	278	21st place	
Men's	Alexei Kiriyevski	25m Rapid fire pistol	Qualification; Stage 2	563	17th place	

== Swimming ==
On 24 June, Israeli swimmer Marc Hinawi became the first Israel to win a medal in swimming at the European games (8th overall), winning the bronze medal in 1,500 metre free style.

Gender	Participant	Event	Round	Time	Place	Ref
Men's	Marc Hinawi	400m Freestyle	Heat 6	3:56.61	15th place	
Men's	Marc Hinawi	1500m Freestyle	Finals	15:25.63	Bronze	
Men's	Marc Hinawi	800m Freestyle	Heat 2	8:07.30	6th place	
Men's	Kirill Baron	50m Butterfly	Heat 7	24.68	17th place	
Men's	Kirill Baron	50m Butterfly	Semifinals	24.39	9th place	
Men's	Kirill Baron	50m Breaststroke	Heat 1	30.42	38th place	
Men's	Kirill Baron	100m Butterfly	Heat 3	56.55	37th place	
Men's	Meiron Cheruti	50m Butterfly	Heat 6	24.59	11th place	
Men's	Meiron Cheruti	50m Butterfly	Semifinals	24.53	13th place	
Men's	Meiron Cheruti	100m Freestyle	Heat 3	53.22	52nd place	
Men's	Meiron Cheruti	100m Butterfly	Heat 2	57.02	42nd place	
Men's	Iliya Gladishev	200m Breaststroke	Heat 3	2:16.78	8th place	
Men's	Iliya Gladishev	200m Breaststroke	Semifinals	Disqualified		
Men's	Iliya Gladishev	100m Breaststroke	Heat 4	1:03.09	9th place	
Men's	Iliya Gladishev	100m Breaststroke	Semifinals	Disqualified		
Men's	Daniel Kaplan	100m Backstroke	Heat 3	58.67	37th place	
Men's	Daniel Kaplan	200m Backstroke	Heat 3	2:06.27	24th place	
Men's	Daniel Kaplan	50m Backstroke	Heat 5	27.91	37th place	
Men's	Idan Dotan	100m Backstroke	Heat 2	59.09	39th place	
Men's	Idan Dotan	50m Backstroke	Heat 3	26.89	23rd place	
Men's	Idan Dotan	50m Freestyle	Heat 4	24.06	43rd place	
Men's	Tomer Drori	100m Backstroke	Heat 2	59.27	42nd place	
Men's	Tomer Drori	200m Medley	Heat 2	2:11.29	39th place	
Men's	Tomer Drori	200m Backstroke	Heat 2	2:07.27	27th place	
Men's	Tomer Drori	400m Individual Medley	Heats	4:41.01	38th place	
Men's	Daniel Aizenberg	100m Backstroke	Heat 1	58.36	34th place	
Men's	Daniel Aizenberg	100m Freestyle	Heat 2	53.85	56th place	
Men's	Daniel Aizenberg	50m Backstroke	Heat 2	26.88	22nd place	
Men's	Daniel Aizenberg	50m Freestyle	Heat 2	23.91	36th place	
Men's	Amir Haviv	50m Breaststroke	Heat 4	29.02	14th place	
Men's	Amir Haviv	50m Breaststroke	Semifinals	28.79	12th place	
Men's	Amir Haviv	100m Breaststroke	Heat 4	1:04.33	21st place	
Men's	Ziv Kalontarov	100m Freestyle	Heat 6	50.69	4th place	
Men's	Ziv Kalontarov	100m Freestyle	Semifinals	50.61	7th place	
Men's	Ziv Kalontarov	100m Freestyle	Finals	50.33	6th place	
Men's	Ziv Kalontarov	50m Freestyle	Heat 6	22:.62	1st place	
Men's	Ziv Kalontarov	50m Freestyle	Semifinals	22.61	1st place	
Men's	Ziv Kalontarov	50m Freestyle	Finals	22.16	Gold	
Men's	Mark Shperkin	100m Freestyle	Heat 4	51.40	23rd place	
Men's	Mark Shperkin	50m Freestyle	Heat 5	23.60	23rd place	
Men's	Ziv Kalontarov; Mark Shperkin; Amir Haviv; Idan Dotan	4 × 100 m Freestyle Relay	Heat 2	3:28.35	10th place	
Men's	Daniel Aizenberg; Iliya Gladishev; Kirill Baron; Mark Shperkin	4 × 100 m Medley Relay	Heat 1	3:50.82	13th place	
Women's	Or Tamir	50m Backstroke	Heats	30.24	18th place	
Women's	Or Tamir	100m Backstroke	Heat 2	1:05.90	23rd place	

== Synchronised Swimming ==
Style	Participants	Round	Score	Place	Result	Ref
Duets	Aviv Lea Bublil; Gal Litman	Qualification; Free routine	139.0000	17th place		
Singles	Gal Litman	Qualification; Free routine	138.7258	18th place		

== Taekwondo ==
Gender	Participant	Weight	Round	Result	Place	Ref
Men's	Gili Haimovitz	58 kg	Preliminary round	Lost 4–7		

== Triathlon ==
Gender	Participant	Start Position	Time	Place	Result	Ref
Men's	Shachar Sagiv	29	1:55:18	37th place		
Men's	Amitai Yonah	22	1:54:25	35th place		
Women's	Avital Gez	44	2:20:20	38th place		

== Water Polo ==
Participants	Opponent	Round	Score	Place	Result	Ref
Inbar Geva; Ofek Golan; Lior Ben David; Nofar Hochberg; Shir Azulay; Abigail Tali Felix; Semon Hila Futorian; Yuval Israeli; Kerem Noy; Maya Shechori; Noa Amado; Nivi Vardi; Eden Tal	Netherlands	Preliminary Round; Group A	Lost 29–1			
Inbar Geva; Ofek Golan; Lior Ben David; Nofar Hochberg; Shir Azulay; Abigail Tali Felix; Semon Hila Futorian; Yuval Israeli; Kerem Noy; Maya Shechori; Noa Amado; Nivi Vardi; Eden Tal	Hungary	Preliminary Round; Group A	Lost 23–3			
Inbar Geva; Ofek Golan; Lior Ben David; Nofar Hochberg; Shir Azulay; Abigail Tali Felix; Semon Hila Futorian; Yuval Israeli; Kerem Noy; Maya Shechori; Noa Amado; Nivi Vardi; Eden Tal	Germany	Preliminary Round; Group A	Lost 10–1			
Inbar Geva; Ofek Golan; Lior Ben David; Nofar Hochberg; Shir Azulay; Abigail Tali Felix; Semon Hila Futorian; Yuval Israeli; Kerem Noy; Maya Shechori; Noa Amado; Nivi Vardi; Eden Tal	Great Britain	Preliminary Round; Group A	Lost 13–9			
Inbar Geva; Ofek Golan; Lior Ben David; Nofar Hochberg; Shir Azulay; Abigail Tali Felix; Semon Hila Futorian; Yuval Israeli; Kerem Noy; Maya Shechori; Noa Amado; Nivi Vardi; Eden Tal	Greece	Preliminary Round; Group A	Lost 19–4			
Inbar Geva; Ofek Golan; Lior Ben David; Nofar Hochberg; Shir Azulay; Abigail Tali Felix; Semon Hila Futorian; Yuval Israeli; Kerem Noy; Maya Shechori; Noa Amado; Nivi Vardi; Eden Tal	France	Preliminary Round; Group A	Lost 12–7			
Inbar Geva; Ofek Golan; Lior Ben David; Nofar Hochberg; Shir Azulay; Abigail Tali Felix; Semon Hila Futorian; Yuval Israeli; Kerem Noy; Maya Shechori; Noa Amado; Nivi Vardi; Eden Tal	Great Britain	Preliminary Round; Group A	Lost 10–5			

== Wrestling ==
Gender	Style	Event	Participant	Round	Result	Place	Ref
Men's	Greco-Roman wrestling	59 kg	Audrey Tsaryuk	Qualification	Lost 4–0		
Men's	Greco-Roman wrestling	98 kg	Robert Avanesyan	Qualification	Lost 3–0		
Men's	Freestyle	65 kg	Mark Popov	Qualification	Won 3–1		
Men's	Freestyle	65 kg	Mark Popov	1/8 Finals	Lost 3–1		
Men's	Freestyle	70 kg	Yuri Poliak	Qualification	BYE		
Men's	Freestyle	70 kg	Yuri Poliak	1/8 Finals	Lost 4–0		
Men's	Freestyle	74 kg	Hanoch Rachamin	1/8 Final	Lost 3–1		
Women's	Freestyle	69 kg	Ilana Kratysh	Quarterfinals	Won 3–0	Silver	
Women's	Freestyle	69 kg	Ilana Kratysh	Semifinals	Won 3–1	Silver	
Women's	Freestyle	69 kg	Ilana Kratysh	Finals	Lost 3–1	Silver	
