= Gymnastics at the 2015 European Games – Women's rhythmic group 2 hoops and 6 clubs =

Women's rhythmic group 2 hoops and 6 clubs at the 2015 European Games
- Venue: National Gymnastics Arena
- Date: 21 June
- Winning score: 18.000

Medalists
gold medal	Ksenya Cheldishkina; Hanna Dudzenkova; Maria Kadobina; Valeriya Pischelina; Arina Tsitsilina	Belarus
silver medal	Yuval Filo; Alona Koshevatskiy; Ekaterina Levina; Karina Lykhvar; Ida Mayrin	Israel
bronze medal	Olena Dmytrash; Yevgeniya Gomon; Oleksandra Gridasova; Valeriia Gudym; Anastasiya Voznyak	Ukraine

The women's rhythmic group 2 hoops and 6 clubs competition at the 2015 European Games was held at the National Gymnastics Arena on 21 June 2015. The six best results from the All-Around Final qualified in the Final.

== Results ==
Rank	Gymnast	Nation	D Score	E Score	Pen.	Total
1st place, gold medalist(s)	Ksenya Cheldishkina; Hanna Dudzenkova; Maria Kadobina; Valeriya Pischelina; Arina Tsitsilina	Belarus	9.050	8.950		18.000
2nd place, silver medalist(s)	Yuval Filo; Alona Koshevatskiy; Ekaterina Levina; Karina Lykhvar; Ida Mayrin	Israel	8.600	8.700	0.05	17.250
3rd place, bronze medalist(s)	Olena Dmytrash; Yevgeniya Gomon; Oleksandra Gridasova; Valeriia Gudym; Anastasiya Voznyak	Ukraine	8.250	8.850		17.100
4	Reneta Kamberova; Mihaela Maevska-Velichkova; Tsvetelina Naydenova; Tsvetelina Stoyanova; Hristiana Todorova	Bulgaria	8.400	8.350		16.750
5	Martina Centofanti; Sofia Lodi; Alessia Maurelli; Camilla Patriarca; Marta Pagnini	Italy	8.250	8.500		16.750
6	Daria Kleshcheva; Anastasia Maksimova; Anastasiia Tatareva; Maria Tolkacheva; Sofya Skomorokh	Russia	8.050	8.150		16.200
