= Ioanna Anagnostopoulou =

Greek rhythmic gymnast (born 1997)

- Ιωάννα Αναγνωστοπούλου
- Born: 12 June 1997 (age 29) Athens, Greece
- Height: 181 cm (5 ft 11 in)

Gymnastics career
- Discipline: Rhythmic gymnastics
- Country represented: Greece
- Club: SFIGA Aigaleo
- Head coach: Irina Ilieva

Ioanna Anagnostopoulou (born 12 June 1997) is a Greek former rhythmic gymnast. She competed in the group rhythmic gymnastics competition at the 2016 Summer Olympics, where the group was eliminated in the qualification round. She also competed at the 2013 World Championships.

== Gymnastics career ==
Anagnostopoulou began rhythmic gymnastics in 2002 in her hometown of Athens and joined the senior national group in 2013. Greece did not send a group to the 2013 European Championships. She competed with the Greek group that finished 11th in the all-around at the 2013 World Championships in Kyiv and did not advance into either apparatus final. Beginning in 2014, she took a break from rhythmic gymnastics, but she returned to the national group in 2016 at the Moscow Grand Prix.

While Anagnostopoulou was on a break, the Greek group advanced to the 2016 Olympic Test Event based on their results at the 2015 World Championships. She was part of the Greek group that won a bronze medal at the Olympic Test Event, behind Germany and Uzbekistan, and as a result, qualified for the 2016 Summer Olympics. They then finished eighth in the all-around at the 2016 European Championships and did not advance into either apparatus final.

One month before the Olympics, she underwent an appendectomy but was able to recover in time to compete. She competed at the 2016 Summer Olympics in Rio de Janeiro alongside Eleni Doika, Zoi Kontogianni, Michaela Metallidou, and Stavroula Samara. The group finished 13th in the qualifications and did not advance to the final.
