= Michaela Metallidou =

Greek rhythmic gymnast

- Μιχαέλα Μεταλλίδου
- Born: 23 January 1993 (age 33) Thessaloniki, Greece

Gymnastics career
- Discipline: Rhythmic gymnastics
- Country represented: Greece (2009-2016)
- Club: AGEMS Spartakos
- Head coach: Irina Ilieva
- Retired: yes

Michaela Metallidou (Greek: Μιχαέλα Μεταλλίδου: born January 23, 1993) is a retired Greek rhythmic gymnast who represented her country in international competitions.

== Career ==
Michaela made her senior debut in April 2009 at the World Cup in Pesaro, taking 16th place overall. In July she took 5th place at the 2009 Mediterranean Games in Pescara. In September she was selected for the World Championships in Mie, finishing 17th in teams, 31st in the All-Around, 27th with rope, 29th with hoop, 41st with ball and 27th with ribbon.

The following year she was 7th with ball and ribbon at the Kalamata World Cup. At the 2010 European Championships in Bremen she was 18th in the All-Around. Participating at the World Championships in Moscow, she was 13th in teams, 31st in the All-Around, 37th with rope, 32nd with hoop, 32nd with ball and 27th with ribbon. In 2011 she broke her leg and she needed two months to recover.

In 2015 she integrated the Greek national group, getting to compete at the 1st European Games in Baku along Eleni Doika, Zoi Kontogianni, Stavroula Samara and Erato Theopistou. There they ended 12th in the All-Around and with 5 ribbons, 10th with 3 pair of clubs and 2 hoops. In early September Michaela was selected for the World Championships in Stuttgart, being 14th overall and 13th in both events, missing the direct qualification to the Olympics by three positions.

In 2016 the group took part in the World Cup in Pesaro, ending 14th overall. In April the Greek group took bronze at the Olympic Test Event, thus earning a spot for the Rio de Janeiro's Games. At the European Championships in Holon they were 8th in the All-Around and 9th in the two events. In August Metallidou, Ioanna Anagnostopoulou, Eleni Doika, Zoi Kontogianni and Stavroula Samara competed at the Olympic Games, taking 13th place in qualification and so not advancing to the final.
