= Jouki Tikkanen =

Finnish rhythmic gymnast

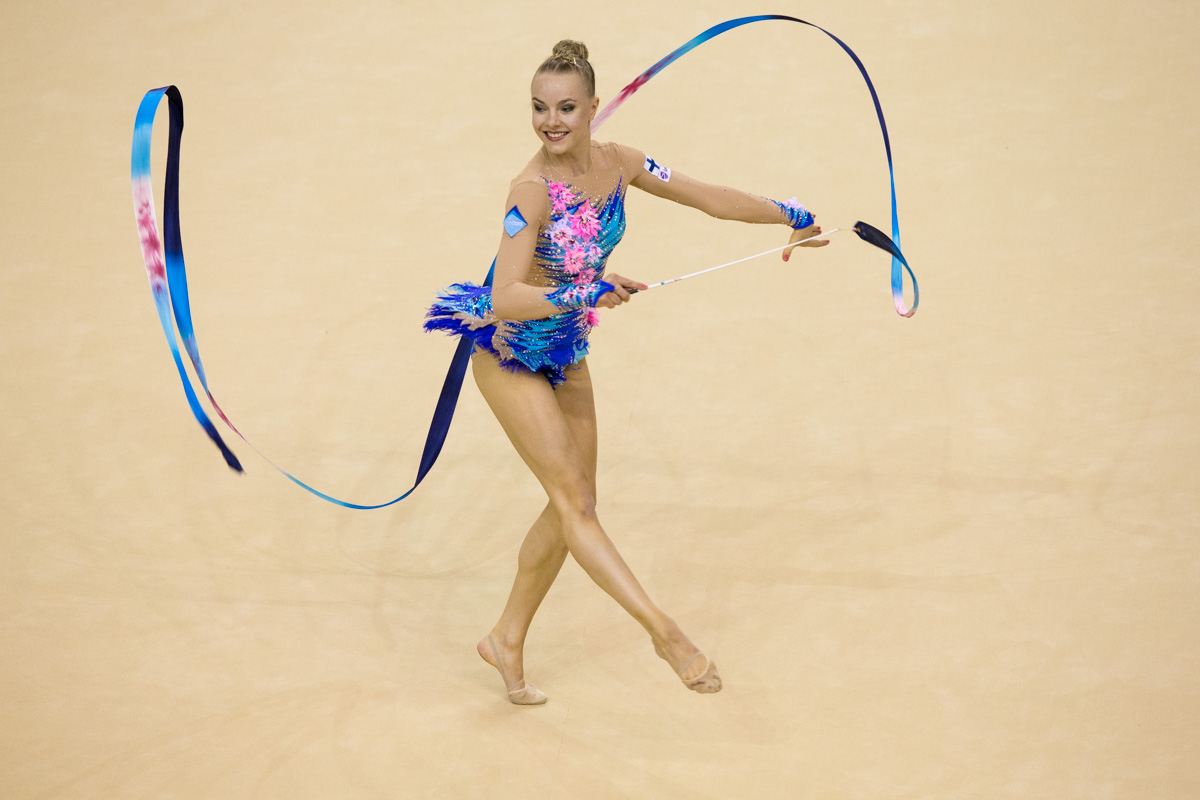

Personal information
- Full name: Jouki Aino Terhikki Tikkanen
- Nickname: Jouki
- Born: 5 July 1995 (age 31) Vantaa, Finland

Gymnastics career
- Discipline: Rhythmic gymnastics
- Country represented: Finland (2010–present)
- Club: Rekolan Raikas
- Gym: Ikuri Sports Hall
- Head coach: Titta Heikkilä

Jouki Aino Terhikki Tikkanen (born 5 July 1995) is a Finnish individual rhythmic gymnast.

== Career ==
Tikkanen started gymnastics in 1999. She is coached by Titta Heikkilä and became a member of the Finnish national gymnastics team in 2010.

=== 2010 ===
In 2010 Tikkanen competed as a junior. She took silver in the Finnish Junior Championships and was selected to junior national team. She represented Finland in the Junior European Championships, helping the team with ball routine, in which she finished 14th. In Marbella Junior Grand Prix she finished 6th.

=== 2011 ===
Tikkanen began competing as senior in 2011 season. She won silver in all-around at the Finnish national championships and was the champion in three apparatus final (hoop, ball, clubs). Her first major competition was at the 2011 European Championships. She competed in her first Worlds at the 2011 World Championships where she finished 55th in all-around qualifications.

=== 2012 ===
In 2012 Tikkanen won her first national champion title in all-around. She took gold also in ball and clubs finals. In fall she competed in Grand Prix series advancing finals in Berlin (6th in clubs and ribbon EF) and in Brno (4th in ball EF and 8th in ribbon EF).

=== 2013 ===
At the 2013 Finnish championships, she took her second gold in the all-around ahed of Ekaterina Volkova and competed at the 2013 World Championships in Kyiv finishing 28th. Along with Volkova, she represented Finland at the 2013 European Championships, finishing 10th in the team standings and they secured Finland in group A to 2015 ECh. She finished 6th in clubs EF in 2013 Valentine Cup in Tartu.

=== 2014 ===
Tikkanen was the 2014 Finnish national all-around champion for third time in a row. She competed at the 2014 World Championships in İzmir, Turkey where she qualified for the all-around finals finishing in 17th position ahead of Ukrainian gymnast Viktoria Mazur. That is the best international achievement for Finnish rhythmic gymnast. She had her highest World Cup placement finishing 14th in all-around and 11th in ribbon at the Corbeil-Essonnes World Cup.

=== 2015 ===
In 2015 Tikkanen finished second in Finnish Championship all-around competition. She was in the first place until the last rotation, where she got a knot in her ribbon. Tikkanen competed at the 2015 World Championships in Stuttgart finishing 35th in the All-around qualifications and did not advance into the Top 24 finals. Tikkanen competed in 2015 European Championships in Minsk, Belarus and finished 21st in all-around and 6th in team final with teammate Ekaterina Volkova.

=== 2016 ===
In 2016 Season, Tikkanen competed at the 2016 Espoo World Cup finishing 19th in the all-around. Tikkanen then finished 8th in the all-around at the 2016 Grand Prix Bucharest with a total of 67.450 points. On April 21–22, Tikkanen and compatriot Jekaterina Volkova vied for a single Olympics berth in individual rhythmic gymnastics however; Tikkanen was edged out by Volkova by finishing fourth amongst a top 8 selection of highest score for non qualified gymnasts at the 2016 Gymnastics Olympic Test Event held in Rio de Janeiro.

On June 3–5, Tikkanen finished 17th in the all-around at the 2016 Guadalajara World Cup. Tikkanen then qualified for the 2016 European Championships in Holon, Israel where she finished in 17th place. In Finnish Championships she was second after Jekaterina Volkova and took gold in clubs EF.

=== 2017 ===
On 24–26 March, Tikkanen competed at the Thiais Grand Prix finishing 18th in the all-around. On 7–9 April, Tikkenen competed at the 2017 Pesaro World Cup finishing 34th in the all-around. On 19–21 May, Tikkanen represented as individual senior for Finaland at the 2017 European Championships. Her next event was at the 2017 World Challenge Cup Guadalajara where she finished 21st in the all-around. On 23–25 June, Tikkanen competed at the 2017 Grand Prix Holon finishing 13th in the all-around. On 5–7 August, Tikkanen finished 19th in the all-around at the 2017 Minsk World Challenge Cup. On 11–13 August, Tikkanen then competed at the 2017 Kazan World Challenge Cup finishing 20th in the all-around. On 30 August – 3 September, Tikkanen competed at the 2017 World Championships in Pesaro, Italy; finishing 43rd in the all-around qualifications and thus not making the top 24 all-around finalists.

=== 2018 ===
Tikkanen started the season competing at the 2018 Moscow Grand Prix finishing 18th in the all-around and qualified into two finals (ball and ribbon). She finished 7th in the ball final and 4th in the ribbon final after Bulgarian Boryana Kaleyn. She competed at the 2018 Sofia World Cup finishing 18 in the all-around. On April 13–15, Tikkanen then competed at the 2018 Pesaro World Cup finishing 29th in the all-around. On May 11–13, Tikkanen achieved a new high placement finishing 8th in the all-around at the 2018 Portimao World Challenge Cup, she also qualified into her first apparatus finals (clubs and ribbon) in a world cup. She finished 4th in the Clubs final and 8th in the ribbon final.

== Personal life ==
Tikkanen graduated from Sports Highschool Mäkelänrinne in June 2015. She was named as Sports Captain in the graduation celebration. Now she is a professional athlete.

== Routine music information ==
Year	Apparatus	Music title
2019	Hoop	
2019	Ball	
2019	Clubs	
2019	Ribbon	La Terre Vue Du Ciel by Armand Amar
2018	Hoop	?
2018	Ball	Send in the Clowns by Barbra Streisand
2018	Clubs	Omé Kayo by Cirque du Soleil.
2018	Ribbon	?
2017	Hoop	Children of the sun by Thomas Bergersen feat. Merethe Soltvedt
2017	Ball	Feeling Good by Michael Buble
2017	Clubs	Hava Nagila by Andre Rieu
2017	Ribbon	?
2016	Hoop	Kecak, The Cudgle Dance by Georgi Andreev
2016	Ball	Send in the Clowns by Barbra Streisand
2016	Clubs	Riverdance by Finale Riverdance International
2016	Ribbon	Apasionada by William Joseph
2015	Hoop	Immortal by Thomas J. Bergersen
2015	Ball	Send in the Clowns by Barbra Streisand
2015	Clubs	Riverdance by Finale Riverdance International
2015	Ribbon	Apasionada by William Joseph
2014	Hoop	Kecak, The Cudgle Dance by Georgi Andreev
2014	Ball	Rozalina by Can Atilla
2014	Clubs	Bubamara (ladybug) music from Black Cat, White Cat by Dejan Sparavalo
2014	Ribbon	Street Passions by Didulya
2013	Hoop	Kecak, The Cudgle Dance by Georgi Andreev
2013	Ball	L'ete Indien by Quadro Nuevo
2013	Clubs	Super Loyko by Loyko
2013	Ribbon	Street Passions by Didulya
2012	Hoop	Pistolero by Dave Grusin
2012	Ball	Nostalgia by Yanni
2012	Clubs	Super Loyko by Loyko
2012	Ribbon	Una música brutal by Gotan Project
2011	Hoop	Santa María (Del Buen Aires) by Gotan Project
2011	Ball	Nostalgia by Yanni
2011	Clubs	Special Order music from Ratatouille by Michael Giacchino
2011	Ribbon	Una música brutal by Gotan Project
