= Ekaterina Volkova (rhythmic gymnast) =

Finnish rhythmic gymnast

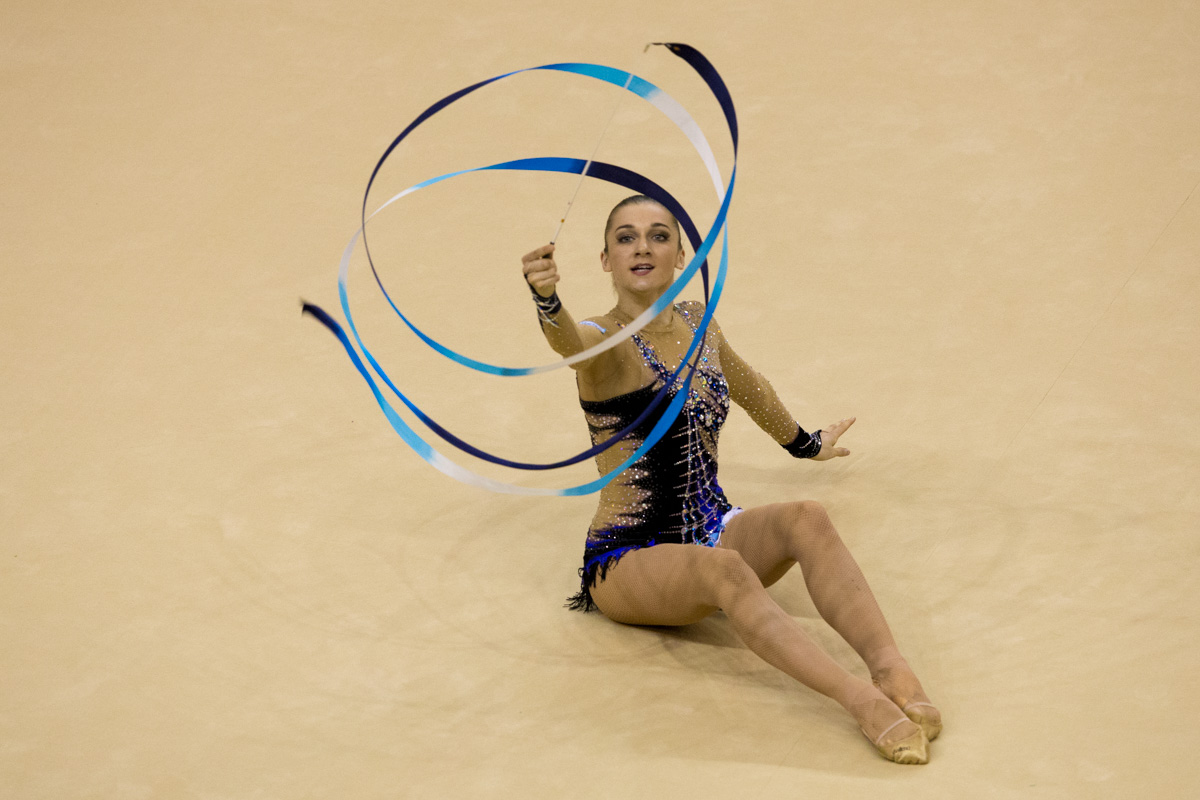

Personal information
- Alternative name: Jekaterina Volkova
- Nickname: Katja
- Born: 2 July 1997 (age 29) Saint Petersburg, Russia

Gymnastics career
- Discipline: Rhythmic gymnastics
- Country represented: Finland (2012 – 2016)
- Club: Elise Helsinki
- Head coach: Larisa Gryadunova
- Choreographer: Jaana Puupponen
- Retired: 2016
- World ranking: 24 (2016 Season)

Ekaterina "Katja" Volkova (born 2 July 1997) is a Finnish former individual rhythmic gymnast. A daughter of Russian parents, she is also Russian citizen.

== Career ==
Volkova started gymnastics in 2004.

=== 2013 ===
At the 2013 Finnish championships, she took the silver medal in the all-around behind Jouki Tikkanen and competed at the 2013 World Championships in Kyiv. Along with Tikkanen, she represented Finland at the 2013 European Championships, finishing 10th in the team standings. She appeared in her first FIG World Cup competitions in 2013.

=== 2014 ===
Volkova was the 2014 Finnish national all-around silver medalist behind Tikkanen and appeared at the 2014 World Championships in İzmir.

=== 2015 ===
Volkova won the all-around gold at the 2015 Finnish championships. She qualified in 27th place in the all-around at the 2015 World Championships and did not reach in the Top 24 finalists.

=== 2016 ===
In 2016, Volkova competed at the Espoo World Cup where she finished a career high of 8th place in the all-around. On April 21–22, she beat compatriot Jouki Tikkanen for an Olympics license in individual rhythmic gymnastics by finishing fourth amongst a top 8 selection of highest score for non qualified gymnasts at the 2016 Gymnastics Olympic Test Event held in Rio de Janeiro.

Volkova finished 12th in the all-around at the 2016 Minsk World Cup. On June 17–19, she appeared in her first continental competition, the 2016 European Championships where she finished in 15th place. On July 8–10, she finished 16th in the all-around at the 2016 Kazan World Cup. On July 22–24, at the 2016 Baku World Cup, Volkova finished 8th in the all-around with a total of 71.000 points – a new personal best – and qualified to two apparatus finals.

On August 19–20, Volkova competed at the 2016 Summer Olympics held in Rio de Janeiro, Brazil. She finished 21st in the rhythmic gymnastics individual all-around qualifications and did not advance into the top 10 finals. She retired from gymnastics after Olympics to continue pursuing in her University studies.
