= Nicole Turuani =

Swiss rhythmic gymnast

- Born: 5 July 1997 (age 29) Giornico, Switzerland

Gymnastics career
- Discipline: Rhythmic gymnastics
- Country represented: Switzerland (2013-2016)
- Retired: yes
Medal record
Group Rhythmic Gymnastics
Representing Switzerland
FIG World Cup
| Event | 1st | 2nd | 3rd |
|---|---|---|---|
| World Cup | 0 | 0 | 1 |
| Total | 0 | 0 | 1 |

Nicole Turuani (born 5 July 1997) is a retired Swiss rhythmic gymnast. She represented Switzerland as a member of the national group.

== Career ==
In 2011 Turuani won gold with ball among juniors at the Swiss Championships.

She became age eligible for senior competitions in 2013, integrating the national group. After taking silver at a bilateral competition with Italy, Switzerland made its debut at the World Cup in Lisbon, where the group was 5th with 3 ribbons & 2 balls and won an historical bronze medal with 10 clubs. In Pesaro they took 5th place overall, 5th with 10 clubs and 4th in the mixed event. In Sofia, being 5th in the All-Around, 7th with 10 clubs and 6th with 3 ribbons & 2 balls. In St. Petersburg they were 8th in the All-Around and 4th with 3 ribbons & 2 balls. In August she was selected for the World Championships in Kyiv along Lisa Tacchelli, Nathanya Koehn, Lisa Rusconi, Julia Eva Novak and Stephanie Kaelin. There the group finished 10th in the All-Around, 9th with 10 clubs and 13th with 3 ribbons & 2 balls.

In March 2014 she took part in the World Cup in Stuttgart, being 7th with 10 clubs and 6th with 3 ribbons & 2 balls. A month later, in Pesaro, the group was 10th in the All-Around and 8th with 10 clubs. In June she competed at the European Championships in Baku, being 9th in the All-Around, 10th with 10 clubs and 9th with 3 ribbons & 2 balls. In September Turuani, Stephanie Kaelin, Julia Eva Novak, Lisa Rusconi, Tamara Stanisic and Anne Tardent, finished 13th in the All-Around, 16th with 5 pairs of clubs and 13th in the mixed event at the World Championships in Izmir.

In 2015 she participated in the World Cup in Tashkent, where Switzerland took 8th place in both the 5 ribbons and the 3 hoops & 2 pairs of clubs' finals. At the 2015 European Games the group was 13th in the All-Around qualification and did not advance to finals. In August she was selected along Gina Duenser, Stephanie Kaelin, Lisa Rusconi, Melanie Soldati and Tamara Stanisic, for the World Championships in Stuttgart, being 21st in the All-Around, 19th with 5 ribbons and 21st with 3 hoops & 2 clubs.

In April 2016 the group took part in the World Cup in Pesaro, taking 12th place overall. Two month later she competed alongside Gina Duenser, Julie Pantillon, Lisa Rusconi, Melanie Soldati and Chiara Torino, at the European Championships in Holon being 10th in the All-Around, 12th with 5 ribbons and 9th with 3 hoops & 2 pairs of clubs. After failing to qualify for the Rio de Janeiro Olympic Games she made the decision to retire.
