= May Miller (gymnast) =

Israeli acrobatic gymnast

- מיי מילר
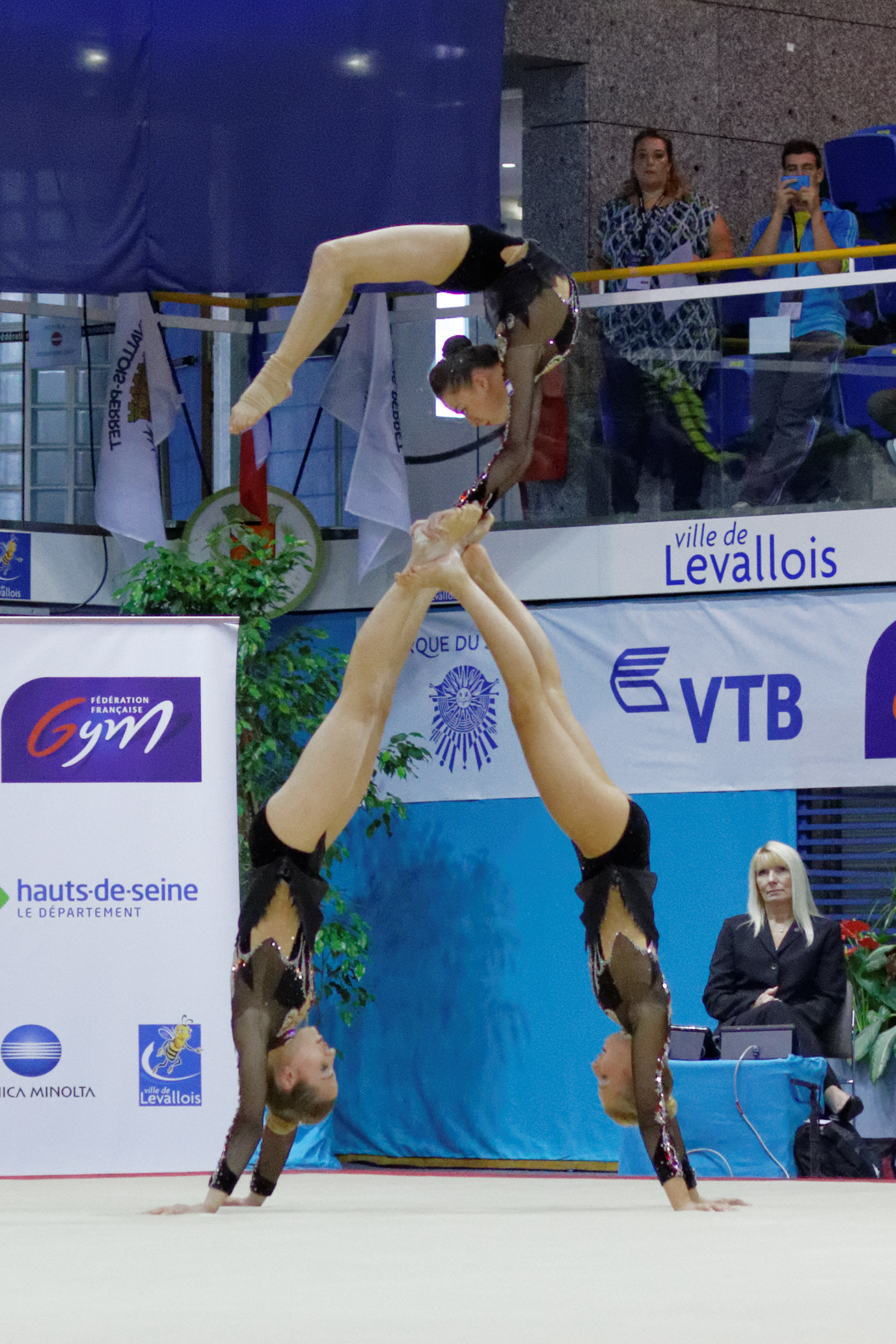

Personal information
- Born: 1 May 1994 (age 32)

Gymnastics career
- Discipline: Acrobatic gymnastics
- Country represented: Israel

May Miller (Hebrew: מיי מילר; born 1 May 1994) is an Israeli female acrobatic gymnast. With partners Avia Brener and Shoval Sofer, Miller competed at the 2014 Acrobatic Gymnastics World Championships, at the 2015 European Games, and at the 2016 Acrobatic Gymnastics World Championships.

She is the daughter of Sarah Miller, the lead coach of the Israeli national team of Acrobatic Gymnastics.

As of 2018, she is the FIG Athletes Representative for Acrobatic Gymnastics.
