= Swimming at the 2015 European Games – Men's 50 metre freestyle =

Men's 50 metre freestyle at the 2015 European Games
- Venue: Aquatic Palace
- Dates: 27 June
- Competitors: 60 from 30 nations
- Winning time: 22.16

Medalists
gold medal	Ziv Kalontarov	Israel
silver medal	Giovanni Izzo	Italy
bronze medal	Aleksei Brianskii	Russia

The men's 50 m freestyle swimming event at the 2015 European Games took place on 27 June at the Aquatic Palace in Baku.

== Results ==
=== Heats ===
The heats were started at 09:30.

Rank	Heat	Lane	Name	Nationality	Time	Notes
1	6	5	Ziv Kalontarov	Israel	22.62	Q, GR
2	7	3	Hüseyin Emre Sakçı	Turkey	22.81	Q
3	6	4	Giovanni Izzo	Italy	22.95	Q
4	7	8	Bruno Blašković	Croatia	23.03	Q
5	5	4	Aleksei Brianskii	Russia	23.06	Q
6	4	0	Daniel Zaitsev	Estonia	23.07	Q
7	4	6	Nikola Miljenić	Croatia	23.12	Q
8	7	5	Alessandro Bori	Italy	23.19	Q
9	5	3	Georg Gutmann	Russia	23.20	Q
10	5	2	Andrej Barna	Serbia	23.22	Q
11	7	0	Oszkár Lavotha	Hungary	23.25	Q
12	7	4	Thomas Fannon	Great Britain	23.26	Q
13	5	5	Andrea Vergani	Italy	23.32	
14	7	9	Nikita Tsernosev	Estonia	23.33	Q
15	7	1	Maxime Cadiat	France	23.34	Q
16	7	1	Ivano Vendramme	Italy	23.35	
17	6	6	Sergii Shevtsov	Ukraine	23.36	Q
18	6	2	Paweł Sendyk	Poland	23.47	Q
19	7	6	Marek Ulrich	Germany	23.49	
20	7	7	Josef Moser	Czech Republic	23.56	
21	6	6	Alexander Lohmar	Germany	23.58	
22	6	8	Ivan Denysenko	Ukraine	23.59	
23	5	8	Mark Shperkin	Israel	23.60	
24	1	4	Robin Grünberger	Austria	23.61	
25	6	3	Daniel Speers	Great Britain	23.62	
26	5	0	Nikita Saunonen	Finland	23.65	
27	5	1	Vladyslav Perepelytsia	Ukraine	23.68	
28	2	3	Viacheslav Ohnov	Ukraine	23.73	
28	4	1	Tobias Bjerg	Denmark	23.73	
30	4	4	Matija Pucarević	Serbia	23.74	
31	4	7	Ármin Reményi	Hungary	23.81	
32	3	2	Philip Greve	Denmark	23.82	
32	6	0	Daniel Forndal	Sweden	23.82	
34	5	6	Robert Glință	Romania	23.84	
35	5	9	Sergei Sudakov	Russia	23.86	
36	5	9	Daniel Aizenberg	Israel	23.91	
36	3	1	Adi Mešetović	Bosnia and Herzegovina	23.91	
38	3	9	Niko Mäkelä	Finland	23.92	
38	4	2	Hryhory Pekarski	Belarus	23.92	
40	3	7	Jakub Książek	Poland	23.95	
41	3	3	Olivier Petignat	Switzerland	23.99	
41	5	7	Michał Brzuś	Poland	23.99	
43	4	5	Idan Dotan	Israel	24.06	
45	3	4	Manuel Leuthard	Switzerland	24.09	
46	3	5	Kristian Komlenić	Croatia	24.10	
47	3	6	Paulus Schön	Germany	24.18	
47	6	9	Marius Rødland	Norway	24.18	
49	6	9	Filip Grimberg	Sweden	24.27	
50	4	9	Gabriel Sonoc	Romania	24.32	
51	1	3	Maid Sukanović	Bosnia and Herzegovina	24.76	
52	2	0	Eric Fernández Malvar	Andorra	24.82	
53	2	6	Dorian Fazekas	Azerbaijan	24.32	
54	2	5	Giorgi Biganishvili	Georgia	24.32	
55	3	0	Sigurd Bøen	Norway	24.32	
56	2	4	Takis Papadopoulos	Cyprus	24.32	
57	2	8	Juderi Bitchkasghvili	Georgia	24.32	
58	2	1	Ljupcho Angelovski	Macedonia	25.76	
59	2	2	Tarik Hoch	Liechtenstein	26.12	
60	1	5	Laurit Muja	Kosovo	27.00	
	4	8	Elisei Stepanov	Russia	DNS	
	6	1	Michał Chudy	Poland	DNS	

=== Semifinals ===
The semifinals was started at 17:30.

==== Semifinal 1 ====
Rank	Lane	Name	Nationality	Time	Notes
1	4	Hüseyin Emre Sakçı	Turkey	22.78	Q
2	5	Bruno Blašković	Croatia	22.90	Q
3	2	Andrej Barna	Serbia	22.94	q
4	3	Daniel Zaitsev	Estonia	23.00	q
5	7	Thomas Fannon	Great Britain	23.03	
6	6	Alessandro Bori	Italy	23.16	
7	8	Paweł Sendyk	Poland	23.22	
8	1	Maxime Cadiat	France	23.42	

==== Semifinal 2 ====
Rank	Lane	Name	Nationality	Time	Notes
1	4	Ziv Kalontarov	Israel	22.61	Q, GR
2	5	Giovanni Izzo	Italy	22.73	Q
3	3	Aleksei Brianskii	Russia	22.76	q
4	7	Oszkár Lavotha	Hungary	22.96	q
5	2	Georg Gutmann	Russia	23.02	
6	1	Nikita Tsernosev	Estonia	23.21	
7	8	Sergii Shevtsov	Ukraine	23.49	
8	6	Nikola Miljenić	Croatia	24.20	

=== Final ===
The final was held at 19:06.

Rank	Lane	Name	Nationality	Time	Notes
1st place, gold medalist(s)	4	Ziv Kalontarov	Israel	22.16	GR
2nd place, silver medalist(s)	5	Giovanni Izzo	Italy	22.51	
3rd place, bronze medalist(s)	3	Aleksei Brianskii	Russia	22.69	
4	6	Hüseyin Emre Sakçı	Turkey	22.75	
5	1	Oszkár Lavotha	Hungary	22.89	
6	7	Andrej Barna	Serbia	22.95	
7	2	Bruno Blašković	Croatia	22.96	
8	8	Daniel Zaitsev	Estonia	22.99	
