= Shoval Sofer =

Israeli acrobatic gymnast

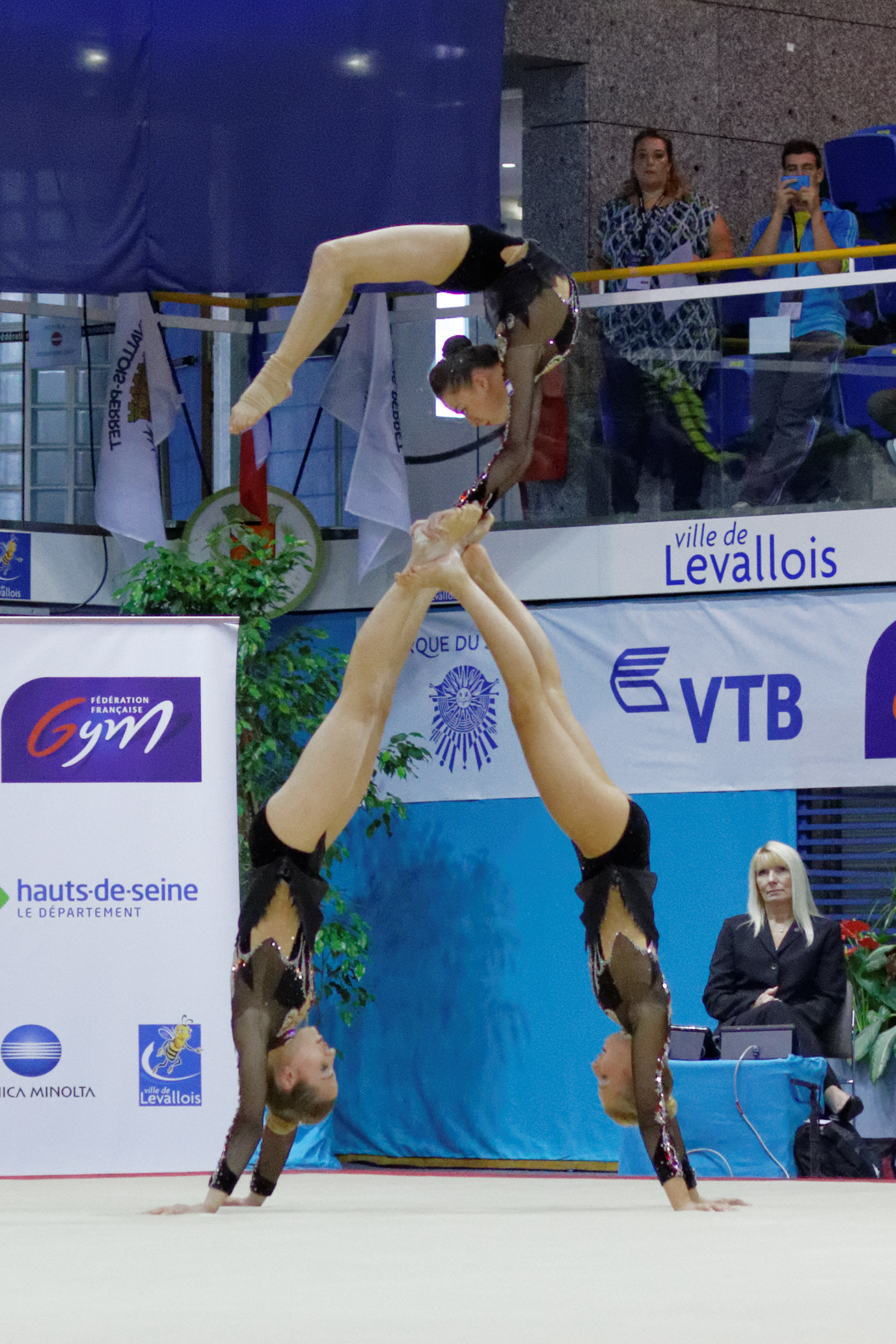

Personal information
- Born: 30 June 1998 (age 28)

Gymnastics career
- Discipline: Acrobatic gymnastics
- Country represented: Israel

Shoval Sofer (Hebrew: שובל סופר; born 30 June 1998) is an Israeli female acrobatic gymnast. With partners Avia Brener and May Miller, Sofer competed at the 2014 Acrobatic Gymnastics World Championships, at the 2015 European Games, and at the 2016 Acrobatic Gymnastics World Championships.
