= Tom Yaacobov =

Israeli triple jumper

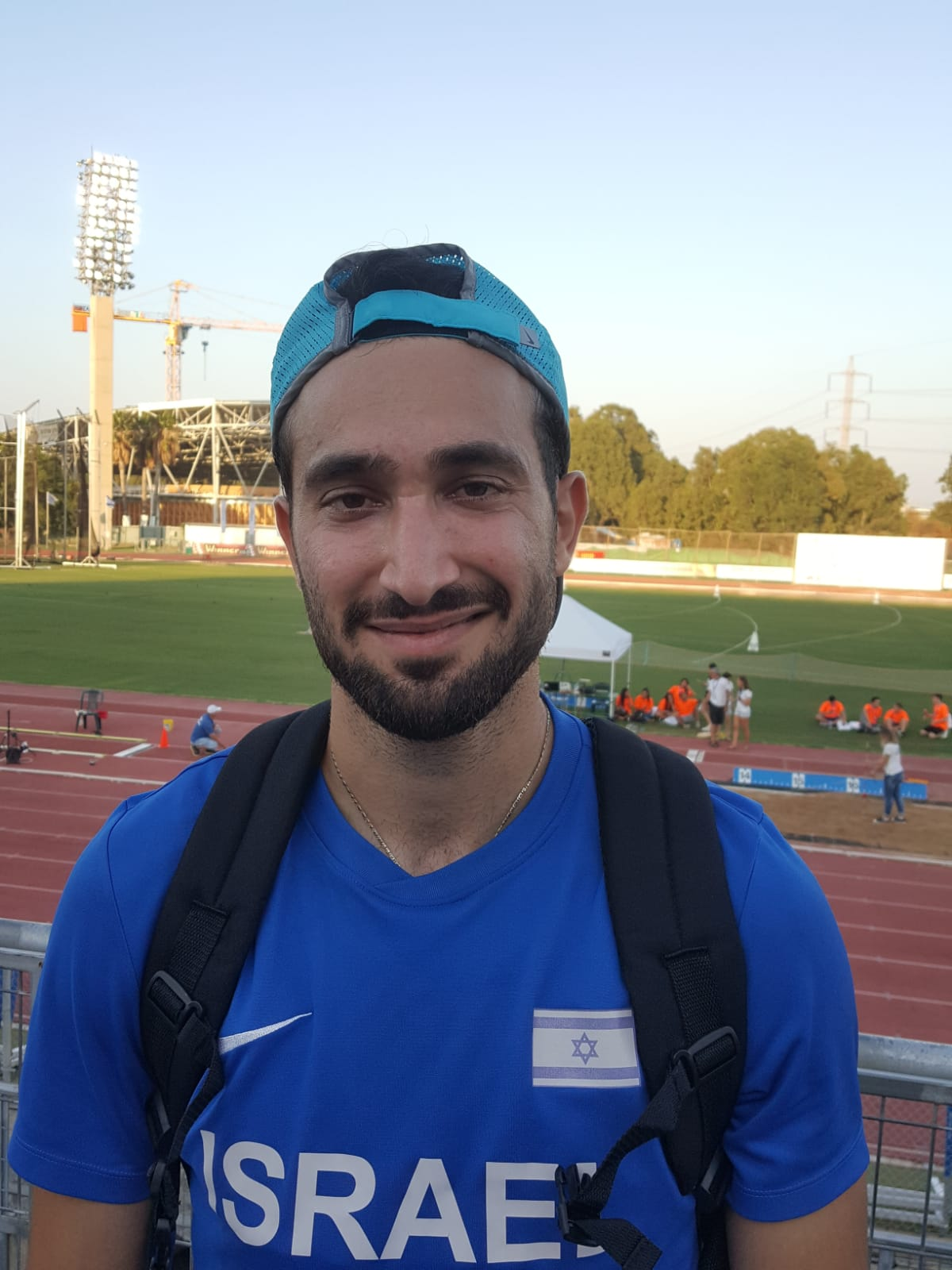

Personal information
- Native name: תום יעקובוב
- National team: Israel
- Born: June 30, 1992 (age 33)

Sport
- Sport: triple jumping
- Club: Maccabi Haifa Carmel
- Coached by: Aharon Shabatayev

Tom Yaacobov (Hebrew: תום יעקובוב; born June 30, 1992) is an Israeli triple jumper.

His club is Maccabi Haifa Carmel, and his coach is Aharon Shabatayev.

He won a bronze medal in the triple jump when he represented Israel at the 2015 European Games. He won a silver medal at the 2016 Balkan Athletics Championships.
