= Avia Brener =

Israeli acrobatic gymnast

- אביה ברנר
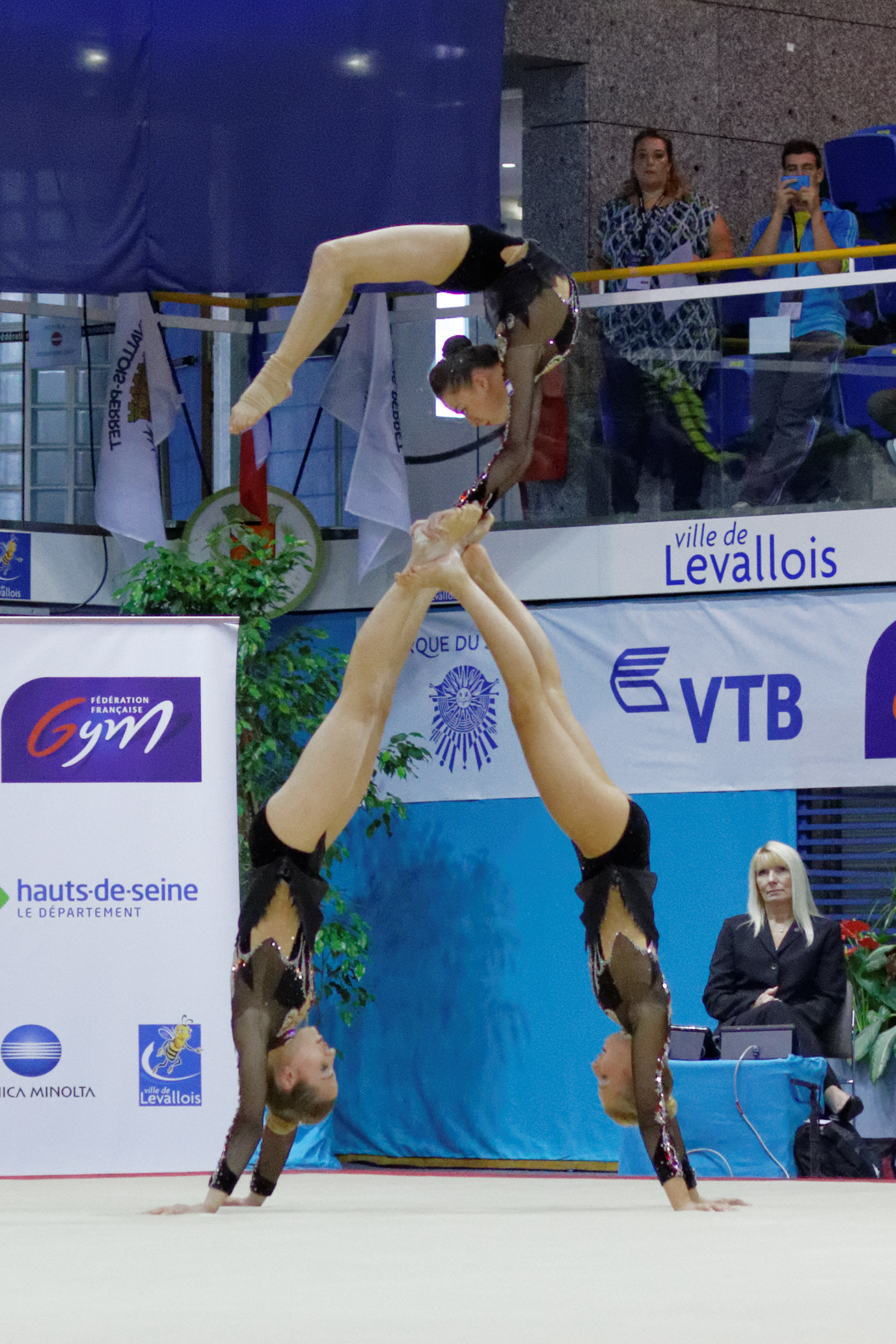

Personal information
- Born: 24 January 1994 (age 32)

Gymnastics career
- Discipline: Acrobatic gymnastics
- Country represented: Israel

Avia Brener (Hebrew: אביה ברנר; born 24 January 1994) is an Israeli female acrobatic gymnast. With partners May Miller and Shoval Sofer, Brener competed at the 2014 Acrobatic Gymnastics World Championships, at the 2015 European Games, and at the 2016 Acrobatic Gymnastics World Championships.
