= Tamara Stanisic =

Swiss rhythmic gymnast

Tamara Stanisic (born 23 July 1998) is a retired Swiss rhythmic gymnast. She represented Switzerland as a member of the national group.

== Career ==
=== Junior ===
In 2013 Stanisic was incorporated into the Swiss junior group that competed at the European Championships in Vienna, along Anne Tardent, Melanie Soldati, Noemi Schilling and Chiara Torino, she took 7th place in the All-Around and 8th place in the final.

=== Senior ===
She became age eligible for senior competitions in 2014, becoming part of the senior group. In March she took part in the World Cup in Stuttgart, being 7th with 10 clubs and 6th with 3 ribbons & 2 balls. A month later, in Pesaro, the group was 10th in the All-Around and 8th with 10 clubs. In June she competed at the European Championships in Baku, being 9th in the All-Around, 10th with 10 clubs and 9th with 3 ribbons & 2 balls. In September Turuani, Stephanie Kaelin, Julia Eva Novak, Lisa Rusconi, Nicole Turuani and Anne Tardent, finished 13th in the All-Around, 16th with 5 pairs of clubs and 13th in the mixed event at the World Championships in Izmir.

In 2015 she participated in the World Cup in Tashkent, where Switzerland took 8th place in both the 5 ribbons and the 3 hoops & 2 pairs of clubs' finals. At the 2015 European Games the group was 13th in the All-Around qualification and did not advance to finals. In August she was selected along Gina Duenser, Stephanie Kaelin, Lisa Rusconi, Melanie Soldati and Nicole Turuani, for the World Championships in Stuttgart, being 21st in the All-Around, 19th with 5 ribbons and 21st with 3 hoops & 2 clubs.

She became a starter again in 2017, debuting at the World Cup in Pesaro where she took 17th place overall. In Tashkent they were 10th in the All-Around and 8th with 5 hoops. At the stage in Sofia the group was 7th overall and with 3 balls & 2 ropes, 8th with 5 hoops. In Guadalajara they were 7th in the All-Around and with 5 hoops, 5th in the mixed event. In Kazan the Suisse group was 13th overall. She was then selected for the World Championships in Pesaro alongside Alice Celio, Gina Duenser, Jasmin Frieden, Chiara Torino and Julia Wymann. There they took 25th place in the All-Around.

In May 2018 the group was 8th in the All-Around at the World Cup in Guadalajara. A month later she helped her teammates in taking 13th place at the European Championships. In Minsk they were 14th in the All-Around. At the last World Cup stage, in Kazan, they were 17th overall. In September she was selected for the World Championships with Tania Cardinale, Gina Duenser, Jasmin Frieden and Julia Wymann. They took 25th in the All-Around, 24th with 5 hoops and 21st with 3 balls & 2 ropes. Following these results, and the failure to qualify for the 2019 World Championships, the Suisse federation decided to end the contract of the whole group.

After her retirement Stanisic began working as a coach assistant at the national training base in Zurich.
