= Ziv Kalontarov =

Israeli swimmer (born 1997)

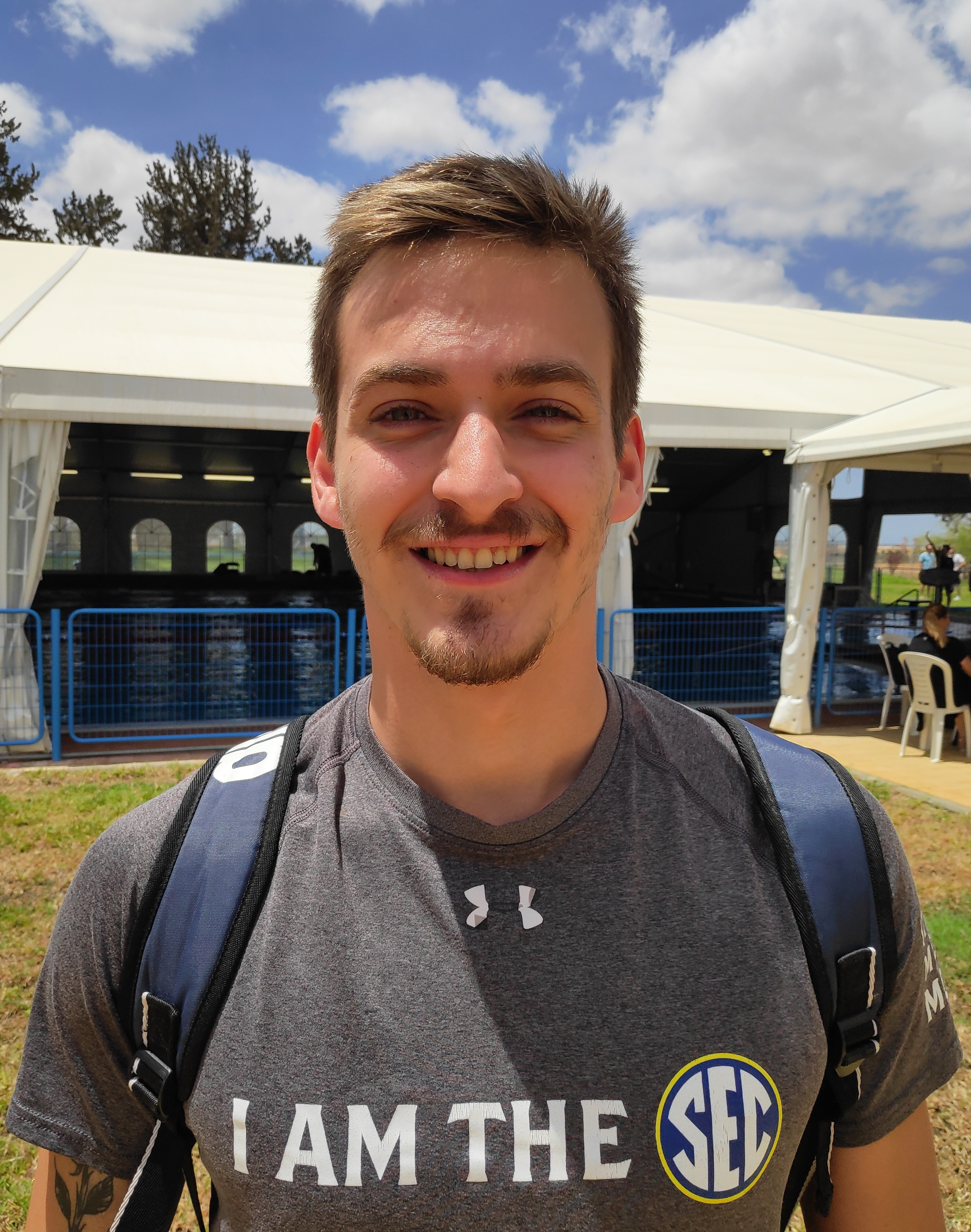

Personal information
- Native name: זיו קלונטרוב
- Nickname: Zu
- Nationality: Israeli
- Born: 15 January 1997 (age 29) Rishon LeZion, Israel
- Height: 183 cm (6 ft 0 in)
- Weight: 70 kg (154 lb)

Sport
- Sport: Swimming
- Strokes: 50 m and 100 m freestyle
- Coach: Gary Kalontarov
Medal record
Swimming
Representing Israel
European Games
Gold medal – first place	2015 Baku	50 m freestyle

Ziv Kalontarov (also "Kalontorov", "Kaluntarov", and "Kalntrov"; Hebrew: זיו קלונטרוב; born 15 January 1997) is an Israeli Olympic swimmer and the reigning European Games champion in the 50 m freestyle.

In April 2015, Kalontarov won the International School Sport Federation (ISF) Swimming World Schools Championship in both the 50 m freestyle (in 22.39) and the 100 m freestyle (in 50.49) in Poznań, Poland. At the age of 18 representing Israel at the 2015 European Games in Baku, Azerbaijan, he won a gold medal with a European Games record time of 22.16 in the 50 m freestyle and thereby won the European Junior Swimming Championships, on 27 June 2015. His time in the final established a new senior Israeli national swimming record in the 50 m freestyle. It qualified him to represent Israel at the 2016 Summer Olympics in Rio de Janeiro, Brazil.

== Biography ==
Kalontarov was born in Rishon LeZion, Israel, to parents Gary and Tatyana. He attended Makif Omer High School, and his nickname is "Zu".

== Swimming career ==
When Kalontarov was young, his mother Tatyana trained him, and his father Gary is now his coach. He trains about 21 hours per week.

In July 2014, he came in sixth in the European Junior Championships Men's 50 m freestyle, and 8th in the Men's 100 m freestyle.

Kalontarov won the 2015 International School Sport Federation (ISF) Swimming World Schools Championship in both the 50 m freestyle (in 22.39) and the 100 m freestyle (in 50.49) in Poznań, Poland, on 19 April 2015.

At the age of 18, Kalontarov represented Israel at the 2015 European Games in Baku, Azerbaijan. He won a gold medal with a European Games record time of 22.16 in the 50 m freestyle and thereby won the European Junior Swimming Championships, on 27 June 2015, after also having the fastest times in both the heat and semi-final of the event. His time in the final established a new senior Israeli national swimming record in the 50 m freestyle, breaking the old record of 22.54 that he himself had set two months earlier, as well as a new personal record for Kalontarov and .16 of a second off the youth world record. He also came in sixth in the 100 m freestyle final. He was selected to carry the Israeli flag at the closing ceremony.

The race result placed him in the top 20 in the world. It also qualified Kalontarov to represent Israel at the 2016 Summer Olympics in Rio de Janeiro, Brazil, which he did.

== See also ==
- List of Israeli records in swimming
- Sports in Israel
