= Oleksandra Gridasova =

Ukrainian rhythmic gymnast (born 1995)

- Full name: Oleksandra Serhiivna Gridasova
- Born: 5 July 1995 (age 31)
- Height: 1.73 m (5 ft 8 in)

Gymnastics career
- Discipline: Rhythmic gymnastics
- Country represented: Ukraine
- Club: Dynamo Kharkiv
- Head coach: Albina Deriugina
Medal record
Rhythmic Gymnastics
Representing Ukraine
Junior European Championships
Bronze medal – third place	2010 Bremen	Ribbon

Oleksandra Serhiivna Gridasova (Ukrainian: Олександра Сергіївна Грідасова; born 5 July 1995) is a Ukrainian female rhythmic gymnast. Gridasova competed alongside London 2012 Olympians Olena Dmytrash, Yevgeniya Gomon, Valeriia Gudym, and rookie Anastasiya Voznyak at the 2016 Summer Olympics in Rio de Janeiro, where she and her Ukrainian team placed seventh in the group all-around final with a total score of 34.282.
