= Olga Dor-Dogadko =

Israeli athlete (born 1976)

Olga Dor-Dogadko, née Dogadedko (Hebrew: אולגה דור-דוגדקו; born 26 June 1976) is a Moldovan-born Israeli athlete who specialized in the 400 metres hurdles and the pole vault.

She emigrated from the Moldovan SSR in 1991. In 1999 she competed in 200 metres at the 1999 World Indoor Championships and in the 400 metres hurdles at the 1999 World Championships. Both times she failed to progress from the first round. She took the Israeli national titles in the 200 metres in 1998 and 2000, in the 100 metres hurdles in 1994, in the 400 metres hurdles in 1995, 1996, 1997, 2001, 2002 and 2003, and in the heptathlon in 1995. Her personal best time in the 400 metres hurdles was 56.75 seconds, achieved in June 1999 in Tel Aviv.

She then switched to the pole vault. She competed at the 2002 European Athletics without registering a valid mark. She took the Israeli national title in 2003 and 2004. Her personal best jump is 4.03 metres, achieved in July 2007 in Tel Aviv.

== See also ==
- List of Israeli records in athletics
