= Zoi Kontogianni =

Greek rhythmic gymnast (born 1997)

Personal information
- Nationality: Greek
- Born: 19 September 1997 (age 27)

Sport
- Sport: Rhythmic gymnastics

Zoi Kontogianni (born 19 September 1997) is a Greek rhythmic gymnast. She competed in the group rhythmic gymnastics competition at the 2016 Summer Olympics, where the team was eliminated in the qualification round.
