= Ida Mayrin =

Israeli rhythmic gymnast

- אידה מיירין
- Full name: Ida Mayrin
- Born: 30 October 1997 (age 28) Kokand, Uzbekistan
- Height: 1.72 m (5 ft 8 in)

Gymnastics career
- Discipline: Rhythmic gymnastics
- Country represented: Israel
- Club: Rishon Le-Zion
- Head coach: Irina Vigdorchik
- Retired: yes
Medal record
Women's rhythmic gymnastics
Representing ISR
World Championships
Silver medal – second place	2014 Izmir	10 Clubs
European Games
Silver medal – second place	2015 Baku	Group All-Around
Silver medal – second place	2015 Baku	6 Clubs + 2 Hoops
Bronze medal – third place	2015 Baku	5 Ribbons
European Championships
Gold medal – first place	2016 Holon	6 Clubs + 2 Hoops
Silver medal – second place	2016 Holon	5 Ribbons
Bronze medal – third place	2014 Baku	Group All-Around
Bronze medal – third place	2016 Holon	Group All-Around

Ida Mayrin (Hebrew: אידה מיירין; born 30 October 1997) is an Israeli female rhythmic gymnast.

Mayrin has collected a total of two bronze medals, as a member of the national squad, at the European Championships (2014 and 2016), and eventually competed alongside her teammates Yuval Filo, Alona Koshevatskiy, Ekaterina Levina, and Karina Lykhvar at the 2016 Summer Olympics in Rio de Janeiro, finishing outside of medals in the group all-around final with a sixth-place score of 34.549.
