= Stavroula Samara =

Greek rhythmic gymnast

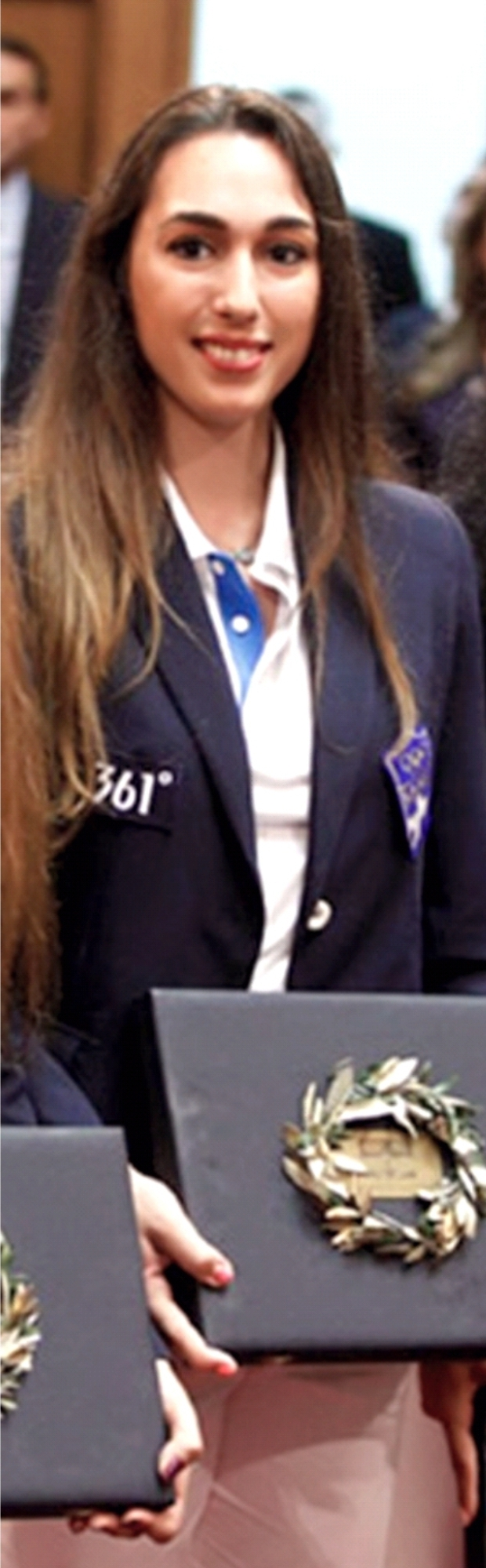

Personal information
- Born: 8 July 1994 (age 32) Thessaloniki, Greece
- Height: 174 cm (5 ft 9 in)

Gymnastics career
- Discipline: Rhythmic gymnastics
- Country represented: Greece; (2009 - 2017)
Medal record
Group Rhythmic Gymnastics
International gymnastics competitions
Representing Greece
Bronze medal – third place	2012 London Olympics	Group All-around
Bronze medal – third place	2016 Rio Olympics	Group All-around

Stavroula Samara (born 8 July 1994 in Thessaloniki) is a Greek rhythmic gymnast and leader of the 2012 and 2016 Olympic team in rhythmic gymnastics. She represented her nation at international competitions including two Olympic Games, five World Championships, four European Championships and fifteen World Cups from 2009 - 2016.

== Athletic career ==
Stavroula competed at the 2010, 2011, 2013, 2014 and 2015 Rhythmic Gymnastics World Championships. In 2015, she participated at the 2015 European Games in Baku.

She competed at the 2012 Summer Olympics in London and at the 2016 Summer Olympics in Rio de Janeiro.

In 2013, she continued her competitive career to the road to 2016 Rio Olympics and started the Olympic cycle by competing at the 2013 World Cup in Saint Petersburg where her team competed at the finals.

Stavroula has been awarded by the President of the Hellenic Republic Mr Prokopis Pavlopoulos at the Presidential Mansion and the Greek Parliament following the 2016 Rio Olympic Games. She has been also awarded by the International Olympic Committee, the Hellenic Club of Olympic Winners the UNESCO Goodwill Ambassador and president of her Foundation “ORAMA ELPIDA”, Marianna Vardinogianni, the Hellenic Olympic Committee, UNICEF Greece etc.

== Volunteering ==
Samara has volunteered with the Hellenic Olympic Committee, the Foundation “ORAMA ELPIDA”, and the Elpida Youth Summer Camp.

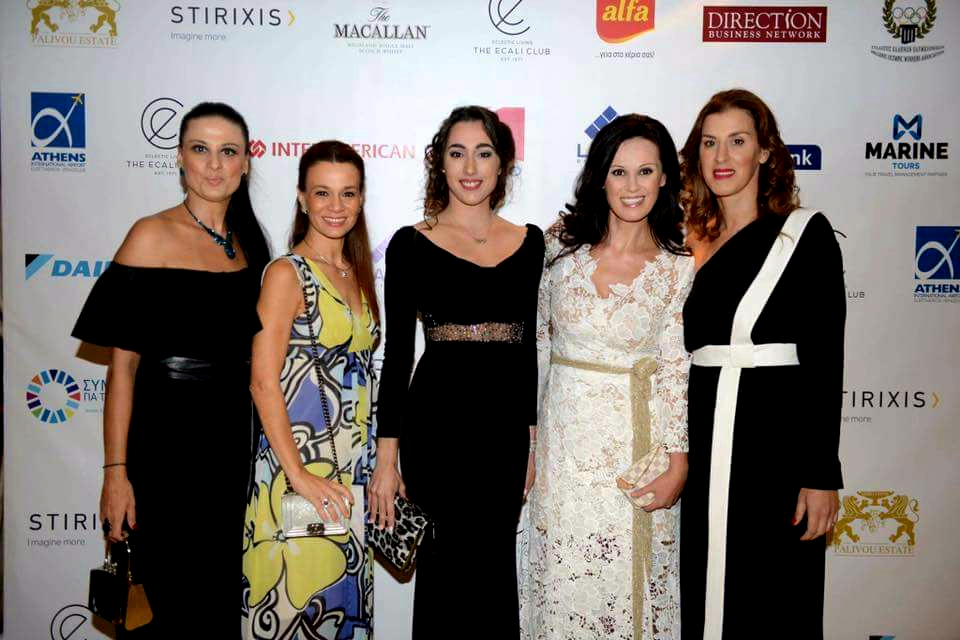
Stavroula Samara at the Award ceremony of Olympian athletes at Ecali Club
