= Yevgeniya Gomon =

Ukrainian rhythmic gymnast

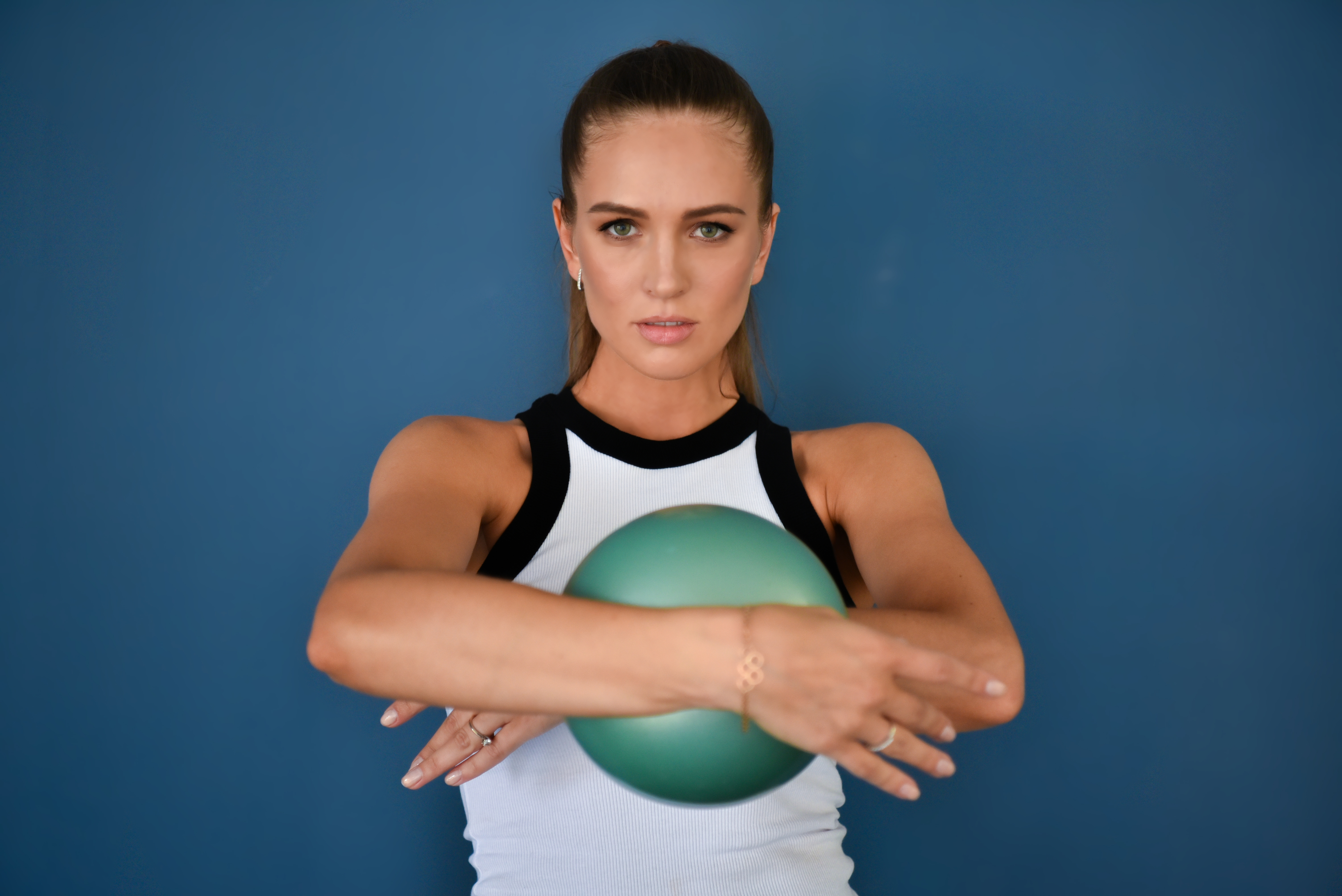
- Yevgeniya Yevgenivna Gomon

Personal information
- Full name: Yevgeniya Yevgenivna Gomon
- Alternative name: Yevheniya Yevhenivna Homon
- Born: 25 March 1995 (age 31) Zaporizhzhya, Ukraine

Gymnastics career
- Discipline: Rhythmic gymnastics
- Country represented: Ukraine; (2013)
Medal record
Representing Ukraine
Group rhythmic gymnastics
World Championships
| Bronze medal – third place | 2013 Kyiv | 10 clubs |
European Games
| Silver medal – second place | 2015 Baku | 5 ribbons |
| Bronze medal – third place | 2015 Baku | 6 clubs + 2 hoops |
Summer Universiade
| Gold medal – first place | 2015 Gwangju | 6 clubs + 2 hoops |
| Silver medal – second place | 2015 Gwangju | Group all-around |
| Silver medal – second place | 2015 Gwangju | 5 ribbons |
| Silver medal – second place | 2013 Kazan | Group all-around |
| Bronze medal – third place | 2013 Kazan | 10 clubs |
| Bronze medal – third place | 2013 Kazan | 2 ribbons + 3 balls |
Gymnasiade
| Silver medal – second place | 2009 Doha | Group all-around |

Yevgeniya Yevgenivna Gomon (Ukrainian: Євгенія Євгенівна Гомон; born 25 March 1995) is a Ukrainian group rhythmic gymnast. She is the 2013 World bronze medalist in 10 clubs and 2015 Universiade champion in 6 clubs + 2 hoops.

== Career ==
Gomon represents her nation at international competitions. She participated at the 2012 Summer Olympics in London.

She also competed at world championships. At the 2013 World Championships, Gomon won the bronze medal in the 10 clubs event. At the 2015 European Games in Baku she won the silver medal in the ribbons event and the bronze medal in the clubs and hoops event.

Gomon was named in the Ukrainian team to the 2016 Summer Olympics in Rio.
