= 2016 Rhythmic Gymnastics European Championships =

- Venue: Holon Toto Hall
- Location: Holon, Israel
- Start date: 17 June 2016
- End date: 19 June 2016
- Nations: 38 members of the European Union of Gymnastics

The 2016 Rhythmic Gymnastics European Championships was the 32nd edition of the Rhythmic Gymnastics European Championships, which took place on 17–19 June 2016 in Holon, Israel.

== Participating countries ==
- Andorra
- Armenia
- Austria
- Azerbaijan
- Belarus
- Bulgaria
- Croatia
- Cyprus
- Czech Republic
- Estonia
- France
- Finland
- Georgia
- Germany
- Great Britain
- Greece
- Hungary
- Israel
- Italy
- Latvia
- Lithuania
- Luxembourg
- Moldova
- Netherlands
- Norway
- Poland
- Portugal
- Romania
- Russia
- Slovenia
- Serbia
- Spain
- Switzerland
- Slovakia
- Sweden
- Turkey
- Ukraine
- Montenegro

== Schedule ==
- Friday, June 17
  - 09:30-11:30 Juniors, group A - rope + hoop
  - 11:50-14:10 Juniors, group B - rope + hoop
  - 14:25-16:45 Juniors, group C - rope + hoop
  - 17:30-17:55 Opening Ceremony
  - 18:00 – 20:35 Senior groups-alternating 5 ribbons / 6 clubs & 2 hoops
- Saturday, June 18
  - 09:00-11:20 Juniors, group B - ball + clubs
  - 11:45-14:05 Juniors, group C - ball + clubs
  - 14:20 – 16:40 Juniors, group A - ball + clubs
  - 16:40 – 16:55 Award ceremony – Juniors Team
  - 17:00 – 19:00 Seniors Group B
  - 19:00 – 21:05 Seniors Group A
  - Award ceremony – Seniors
- Sunday, June 19
  - 13:00-13:50 Juniors Finals (rope & hoop)
  - 13:50-14:05 Award Ceremony (rope & hoop)
  - 14:05-14:55 Juniors Finals (ball & clubs)
  - 14:55-15:10 Award Ceremony (ball & clubs)
  - 16:15 – 16:55 Senior Groups Finals - 5 Ribbons
  - 16:57-18:00 Senior groups Finals – 6 clubs & 2 hoops
  - Award Ceremony (groups 5 ribbons, 6 clubs & 2 hoops)
  - 18:30 Gala + Closing Ceremony

== Medal winners ==
Event	Gold	Silver	Bronze
Senior Individual Finals
All-around	Yana Kudryavtseva; Russia	Margarita Mamun; Russia	Ganna Rizatdinova; Ukraine
Senior Group Finals
All-around	Russia; Anastasia Bliznyuk; Anastasia Maksimova; Ksenia Poliakova; Anastasiia Tatareva; Maria Tolkacheva	Belarus; Ksenya Cheldishkina; Hanna Dudzenkova; Maryia Katsiak; Maria Kadobina; Valeriya Pischelina; Arina Tsitsilina	Israel; Yuval Filo; Alona Koshevatskiy; Ekaterina Levina; Karina Lykhvar; Ida Mayrin
5 Ribbons	Belarus; Hanna Dudzenkova; Maryia Katsiak; Maria Kadobina; Valeriya Pischelina; Arina Tsitsilina	Israel; Yuval Filo; Alona Koshevatskiy; Ekaterina Levina; Karina Lykhvar; Ida Mayrin	Spain; Alejandra Quereda; Artemi Gavezou; Elena López; Lourdes Mohedano; Sandra Aguilar
6 Clubs + 2 Hoop	Israel; Yuval Filo; Alona Koshevatskiy; Ekaterina Levina; Karina Lykhvar; Ida Mayrin	Spain; Alejandra Quereda; Artemi Gavezou; Elena López; Lourdes Mohedano; Sandra Aguilar	Bulgaria; Mihaela Maevska-Velichkova; Reneta Kamberova; Tsvetelina Naydenova; Lyubomira Kazanova; Hristiana Todorova
Junior Finals
Team	Russia; Alina Ermolova; Polina Shmatko; Maria Sergeeva	Belarus; Julia Evchik; Alina Harnasko; Yuliya Isachanka	Italy; Alexandra Agiurgiuculese; Milena Baldassarri
Rope	Alina Ermolova; Russia	Julia Evchik; Belarus	Alexandra Agiurgiuculese; Italy
Hoop	Maria Sergeeva; Russia	Nicol Zelikman; Israel	None Awarded
Hoop	Maria Sergeeva; Russia	Alina Harnasko; Belarus	None Awarded
Ball	Polina Shmatko; Russia	Alexandra Agiurgiuculese; Italy	Nicol Zelikman; Israel
Clubs	Polina Shmatko; Russia	Alexandra Agiurgiuculese; Italy	Yuliya Isachanka; Belarus

== Results ==
=== Seniors ===
==== Individual all-around ====
Rank	Gymnast	Nation	Hoop (rhythmic gymnastics)	Ball (rhythmic gymnastics)	Clubs (rhythmic gymnastics)	Ribbon (rhythmic gymnastics)	Total
1st place, gold medalist(s)	Yana Kudryavtseva	Russia	18.866 (2)	19.100 (2)	19.166 (2)	18.950 (2)	76.082
2nd place, silver medalist(s)	Margarita Mamun	Russia	18.000 (10)	19.166 (1)	19.333 (1)	19.133 (1)	75.632
3rd place, bronze medalist(s)	Ganna Rizatdinova	Ukraine	18.966 (1)	18.683 (3)	18.900 (3)	18.750 (3)	75.299
4	Melitina Staniouta	Belarus	18.733	17.816	18.766	18.400	73.715
5	Salome Pazhava	Georgia	18.100	18.483	18.400	18.450	73.433
6	Victoria Veinberg Filanovsky	Israel	18.400	18.233	18.266	18.183	73.082
7	Marina Durunda	Azerbaijan	18.150	18.083	17.683	18.200	72.116
8	Linoy Ashram	Israel	18.133	18.000	17.975	17.966	72.074
9	Carolina Rodriguez	Spain	18.050	18.000	17.966	18.033	72.049
10	Neviana Vladinova	Bulgaria	18.066	17.983	17.808	17.950	71.807
11	Katsiaryna Halkina	Belarus	17.558	18.316	18.216	17.066	71.156
12	Veronica Bertolini	Italy	17.616	17.650	17.666	17.266	70.198
13	Katrin Taseva	Bulgaria	17.266	17.633	17.483	17.500	69.882
14	Varvara Filiou	Greece	17.666	17.475	17.700	16.641	69.482
15	Ekaterina Volkova	Finland	17.600	17.600	15.950	17.400	68.550
16	Viktoriia Mazur	Ukraine	15.950	17.425	17.250	17.466	68.091
17	Jouki Tikkanen	Finland	17.166	16.150	17.133	17.033	67.482
18	Alessia Russo	Italy	17.066	17.116	15.833	17.083	67.098
19	Natalia Garcia Timofeeva	Spain	16.083	17.333	15.566	17.266	66.248
20	Zhala Piriyeva	Azerbaijan	15.700	14.300	16.583	15.083	61.666

==== Group all-around ====
Rank	Nation	5	6 2	Total
1st place, gold medalist(s)	Russia	18.583	18.825	37.408
2nd place, silver medalist(s)	Belarus	18.333	18.516	36.849
3rd place, bronze medalist(s)	Israel	18.216	18.333	36.549
4	Italy	17.983	17.950	35.933
5	Bulgaria	17.850	18.000	35.850
6	Spain	17.650	17.683	35.333
7	Finland	16.650	17.083	33.733
8	Greece	16.733	16.683	33.416
9	Germany	16.183	17.200	33.383
10	Switzerland	16.083	16.683	32.766
11	Azerbaijan	17.033	15.400	32.433
12	Hungary	15.050	16.483	31.533
13	Ukraine	17.333	14.008	31.341
14	Slovenia	15.166	14.416	29.582
15	Czech Republic	13.450	16.000	29.450
16	Latvia	14.100	13.950	28.050

==== Group 5 Ribbons ====
Rank	Nation	D Score	E Score	Pen.	Total
1st place, gold medalist(s)	Belarus	9.250	9.266	0.0	18.516
2nd place, silver medalist(s)	Israel	9.200	9.200	0.0	18.400
3rd place, bronze medalist(s)	Spain	9.000	9.133	0.0	18.133
4	Bulgaria	9.000	9.066	0.0	18.066
5	Russia	9.100	8.833	0.0	17.933
6	Italy	8.775	8.900	0.0	17.675
7	Ukraine	8.850	8.800	0.0	17.650
8	Azerbaijan	8.550	8.783	0.0	17.333

==== Group 6 Clubs + 2 Hoops ====
Rank	Nation	D Score	E Score	Pen.	Total
1st place, gold medalist(s)	Israel	9.050	9.266	0.0	18.316
2nd place, silver medalist(s)	Spain	9.100	9.133	0.0	18.233
3rd place, bronze medalist(s)	Bulgaria	9.050	9.133	0.0	18.183
4	Belarus	9.000	8.666	0.0	17.666
5	Finland	8.600	8.600	0.0	17.200
6	Germany	8.400	8.500	0.0	16.900
7	Italy	8.600	8.166	0.0	16.766
8	Russia	8.425	7.566	0.0	15.991

=== Juniors ===
==== Team ====
Rank	Nation	Rope (rhythmic gymnastics)	Hoop (rhythmic gymnastics)	Ball (rhythmic gymnastics)	Clubs (rhythmic gymnastics)	Total
1st place, gold medalist(s)	Russia	16.866	16.933	33.483	33.749	101.031
2nd place, silver medalist(s)	Belarus	16.625	33.449	33.566	16.733	100.373
3rd place, bronze medalist(s)	Italy	0.000	32.533	33.150	33.300	98.983
4	Israel	32.524	32.900	16.666	16.650	98.740
5	Bulgaria	16.000	16.000	31.799	16.533	96.289
6	Ukraine	15.750	31.616	31.799	15.866	95.031
7	Armenia	15.933	31.158	15.766	31.791	94.648
8	Azerbaijan	30.941	31.158	0.000	30.666	92.765
9	Germany	30.916	30.707	15.416	15.566	92.605
10	Hungary	30.650	31.116	15.166	15.166	92.098
11	Georgia	15.100	30.749	15.000	30.799	91.648
12	France	30.483	15.066	15.616	30.416	91.581
13	Turkey	15.450	30.383	15.233	30.491	91.557
14	Spain	30.583	30.324	30.049	0.000	90.956
15	Poland	30.158	30.374	14.966	15.225	90.723
16	Romania	15.316	29.933	30.183	14.933	90.365
17	Greece	14.658	15.350	30.582	29.650	90.240
18	Moldova	15.116	28.416	30.383	14.900	88.815
19	Austria	14.275	29.466	14.900	29.966	88.607
20	Estonia	14.916	29.366	14.700	29.158	88.140
20	Great Britain	14.250	29.583	14.458	29.849	88.140
22	Latvia	0.000	29.616	29.116	29.366	88.098
23	Finland	29.033	0.000	29.349	29.466	87.848
24	Czech Republic	0.000	29.308	28.250	29.932	87.490
25	Portugal	28.666	14.633	14.766	28.899	86.964
26	Serbia	28.116	14.875	14.433	28.382	85.806
27	Cyprus	28.166	0.000	28.374	28.016	84.556
28	Slovenia	27.233	28.049	28.266	0.000	83.548
29	Croatia	12.758	28.225	27.100	13.916	81.999
30	Lithuania	13.483	27.600	27.083	13.650	81.816
31	Slovakia	13.533	26.758	28.066	13.316	81.673
32	Norway	12.966	27.533	13.208	27.383	81.090
33	Ireland	12.750	24.241	24.583	13.741	76.315
34	Sweden	12.616	12.966	25.316	25.383	76.281
35	Andorra	11.400	11.933	22.883	24.307	70.523
36	Montenegro	15.874	9.450	16.716	7.866	49.905

==== Rope ====
Rank	Gymnast	Nation	D Score	E Score	Pen.	Total
1st place, gold medalist(s)	Alina Ermolova	Russia	7.750	9.300	0.0	17.050
2nd place, silver medalist(s)	Julia Evchik	Belarus	7.650	9.266	0.0	16.916
3rd place, bronze medalist(s)	Alexandra Agiurgiuculese	Italy	7.350	9.033	0.0	16.383
4	Yuliana Telegina	Israel	7.350	8.933	0.0	16.283
5	Yoana Nikolova	Bulgaria	7.300	8.900	0.0	16.200
6	Khrystyna Pohranychna	Ukraine	7.150	8.900	0.0	16.050
7	Yulia Vodopyanova	Armenia	7.200	8.766	0.0	15.966
8	Veronika Hudis	Azerbaijan	6.900	8.600	0.0	15.500

==== Hoop ====
Rank	Gymnast	Nation	D Score	E Score	Pen.	Total
1st place, gold medalist(s)	Maria Sergeeva	Russia	7.800	9.300	0.0	16.900
2nd place, silver medalist(s)	Alina Harnasko	Belarus	7.800	9.100	0.0	16.700
2nd place, silver medalist(s)	Nicol Zelikman	Israel	7.500	9.200	0.0	16.700
4	Alexandra Agiurgiuculese	Italy	7.125	9.033	0.0	16.158
5	Yoana Nikolova	Bulgaria	6.950	8.900	0.0	15.850
6	Mira Varay	Hungary	6.875	8.766	0.0	15.641
7	Olena Diachenko	Ukraine	6.900	8.200	0.0	15.100
8	Ilaha Mammadova	Azerbaijan	6.750	8.133	0.0	14.883

==== Ball ====
Rank	Gymnast	Nation	D Score	E Score	Pen.	Total
1st place, gold medalist(s)	Polina Shmatko	Russia	7.700	9.400	0.0	17.100
2nd place, silver medalist(s)	Alexandra Agiurgiuculese	Italy	7.550	9.233	0.0	16.783
3rd place, bronze medalist(s)	Nicol Zelikman	Israel	7.500	9.200	0.0	16.700
4	Yoana Nikolova	Bulgaria	7.500	8.966	0.0	16.466
5	Julia Evchik	Belarus	7.150	8.866	0.0	16.016
6	Yulia Vodopyanova	Armenia	7.150	8.766	0.0	15.916
7	Danae Collard	France	7.150	8.733	0.0	15.883
8	Olena Diachenko	Ukraine	6.250	8.166	0.0	14.416

==== Clubs ====
Rank	Gymnast	Nation	D Score	E Score	Pen.	Total
1st place, gold medalist(s)	Polina Shmatko	Russia	7.800	9.400	0.0	17.200
2nd place, silver medalist(s)	Alexandra Agiurgiuculese	Italy	7.650	9.233	0.0	16.883
3rd place, bronze medalist(s)	Yuliya Isachanka	Belarus	7.550	9.300	0.0	16.850
4	Yoana Nikolova	Bulgaria	7.500	9.100	0.0	16.600
5	Yulia Vodopyanova	Armenia	7.300	8.766	0.0	16.066
6	Olena Diachenko	Ukraine	7.300	8.766	0.0	16.066
7	Elisabeth Rachid	France	7.000	8.666	0.0	15.666
8	Yuliana Telegina	Israel	7.000	8.633	0.0	15.633

== Medal count ==
Host nation

Rank	Nation	Gold	Silver	Bronze	Total
1	Russia (RUS)	7	1	0	8
2	Belarus (BLR)	1	4	1	6
3	Israel (ISR)*	1	2	2	5
4	Italy (ITA)	0	2	2	4
5	Spain (ESP)	0	1	1	2
6	Bulgaria (BUL)	0	0	1	1
6	Ukraine (UKR)	0	0	1	1
Totals (7 entries)		9	10	8	27
