= Yuval Filo =

Israeli rhythmic gymnast

- יובל פילו
- Full name: Yuval Filo
- Born: 3 March 1998 (age 28)
- Height: 1.68 m (5 ft 6 in)

Gymnastics career
- Discipline: Rhythmic gymnastics
- Country represented: Israel
- Club: Maccabi Tel Aviv
- Head coach: Irina Vigdorchik
- Retired: yes
Medal record
Women's rhythmic gymnastics
Representing Israel
World Championships
Silver medal – second place	2014 Izmir	10 Clubs
European Games
Silver medal – second place	2015 Baku	Group All-Around
Silver medal – second place	2015 Baku	6 Clubs + 2 Hoops
Bronze medal – third place	2015 Baku	5 Ribbons
European Championships
Gold medal – first place	2016 Holon	6 Clubs + 2 Hoops
Silver medal – second place	2016 Holon	5 Ribbons
Bronze medal – third place	2014 Baku	Group All-Around
Bronze medal – third place	2016 Holon	Group All-Around

Yuval Filo (Hebrew: יובל פילו; born March 3, 1998) is an Israeli female rhythmic gymnast.

Filo has collected a total of two bronze medals, as a member of the national squad, at the European Championships (2014 and 2016), and eventually competed alongside her teammates Alona Koshevatskiy, Ekaterina Levina, Karina Lykhvar and Ida Mayrin at the 2016 Summer Olympics in Rio de Janeiro, finishing outside of medals in the group all-around final with a sixth-place score of 34.549.
