= Alona Koshevatskiy =

Israeli rhythmic gymnast

- אלונה קושבצקי
- Full name: Alona Koshevatskiy
- Born: 8 October 1997 (age 28)
- Height: 1.70 m (5 ft 7 in)

Gymnastics career
- Discipline: Rhythmic gymnastics
- Country represented: Israel (2011-2016)
- Club: Maccabi Tel Aviv
- Head coach: Irina Vigdorchik
- Retired: yes
Medal record
Women's rhythmic gymnastics
Representing Israel
World Championships
Silver medal – second place	2014 Izmir	10 Clubs
European Games
Silver medal – second place	2015 Baku	Group All-Around
Silver medal – second place	2015 Baku	6 Clubs + 2 Hoops
Bronze medal – third place	2015 Baku	5 Ribbons
European Championships
Gold medal – first place	2016 Holon	6 Clubs + 2 Hoops
Silver medal – second place	2016 Holon	5 Ribbons
Bronze medal – third place	2014 Baku	Group All-Around
Bronze medal – third place	2016 Holon	Group All-Around
Junior European Championships
Bronze medal – third place	2011 Minsk	Group All-around

Alona Koshevatskiy (Hebrew: אלונה קושבצקי; born 8 October 1997) is an Israeli female rhythmic gymnast. She's a two-time (2014, 2016) European Group All-Around bronze medalist and the 2015 European Games Group All-Around silver medalist. She retired in 2016, after competing in the 2016 Olympic Games.

== Rhythmic gymnastics career ==
=== Junior ===
Alona competed as a part of Israeli Junior Group at the 2011 European Championships in Minsk, Belarus with 5 Ropes routine. They won bronze medal in Group All-Around and placed 5th in Apparatus Final. In 2012, she competed as an individual gymnast. She was a part of Israeli Junior Team which placed 7th in Team competition at the 2012 European Championships in Nizhny Novgorod, Russia. She qualified to two Apparatus Finals, where she placed 8th with Clubs and 7th with Ribbon.

=== Senior ===
Koshevatskiy won a total of two bronze medals, while serving as the captain of the national squad, at the European Championships (2014 and 2016), and eventually competed alongside her teammates Yuval Filo, Ekaterina Levina, Karina Lykhvar, and Ida Mayrin at the 2016 Summer Olympics in Rio de Janeiro, finishing outside of medals in the Group All-Around Final with a sixth-place score of 34.549. Koshevatskiy was also selected by the Israel Olympic Committee to carry the national flag at the closing ceremony of the 2016 Summer Olympics.

== See also ==
- List of medalists at the Rhythmic Gymnastics Junior European Championships
