= Karina Lykhvar =

Israeli rhythmic gymnast

- קרינה ליחבר
- Full name: Karina Lykhvar
- Born: 11 December 1998 (age 27) Romny, Ukraine
- Height: 1.70 m (5 ft 7 in)

Gymnastics career
- Discipline: Rhythmic gymnastics
- Country represented: Israel; (2024-2016)
- Club: Maccabi Tel Aviv
- Head coach: Irina Vigdorchik
- Retired: yes
Medal record
Women's rhythmic gymnastics
Representing ISR
World Championships
Silver medal – second place	2014 Izmir	10 Clubs
European Games
Silver medal – second place	2015 Baku	Group All-Around
Silver medal – second place	2015 Baku	6 Clubs + 2 Hoops
Bronze medal – third place	2015 Baku	5 Ribbons
European Championships
Gold medal – first place	2016 Holon	6 Clubs + 2 Hoops
Silver medal – second place	2016 Holon	5 Ribbons
Bronze medal – third place	2014 Baku	Group All-Around
Bronze medal – third place	2016 Holon	Group All-Around

Karina Lykhvar (Hebrew: קרינה ליחבר; born 11 December 1998) is a retired Israeli female rhythmic gymnast. She's a two-time (2014, 2016) European Group All-Around bronze medalist and the 2015 European Games Group All-Around silver medalist. She retired in 2016, after competing in the 2016 Olympic Games.

== Career ==
She took up gymnastics at age seven, and began competing three years later in 2008.

Karina has won a total of two bronze medals, as a member of the national squad, at the European Championships (2014 and 2016), and eventually competed alongside her teammates Yuval Filo, Alona Koshevatskiy, Ekaterina Levina, and Ida Mayrin at the 2016 Summer Olympics in Rio de Janeiro, finishing outside of medals in the group all-around final with a sixth-place score of 34.549.

Since the beginning of 2022, she resides in Los Angeles, California and works as a coach at Burlo Gymnastics club.
