= 1999–2000 FIG Rhythmic Gymnastics World Cup series =

The 1999–2000 FIG Rhythmic Gymnastics World Cup series was a series of stages where events in rhythmic gymnastics were contested. The series consisted of a two-year long competition, culminating at a final event — the World Cup Final in 2000. A number of qualifier stages were held. The top 3 gymnasts in each apparatus at the qualifier events would receive medals and prize money. Gymnasts that finished in the top 8 also received points which were added up to a ranking that qualified for the biennial World Cup Final.

== Stages ==
Besides specific World Cup stages, the 1999 World Championships was also part of the 1999–2000 World Cup series. Even though some stages distributed only a single set of medals after the all-around event, all of the stages awarded points valid for each different apparatus.

Year	Event	Location	Type	Ref.
1999	World Cup qualifier	(France) Corbeil-Essonnes	Individuals	
1999	World Cup qualifier	(Germany) Bochum	Individuals	
1999	World Championships / World Cup qualifier	(Japan) Osaka	Individuals	
2000	World Cup qualifier	(France) Corbeil-Essonnes	Individuals	
2000	~~World Cup qualifier~~	(Germany) Bochum	Canceled (Individuals)	
2000	World Cup Final	(United Kingdom) Glasgow	Individuals	

== Medalists ==
=== All-around ===
Competitions	Gold	Silver	Bronze
Corbeil 1999	(Russia) Alina Kabaeva	(Belarus) Yulia Raskina	(Belarus) Evgenia Pavlina
Bochum 1999	(Russia) Alina Kabaeva	(Germany) Edita Schaufler	(Belarus) Valeria Vatkina
Osaka 1999	(Russia) Alina Kabaeva	(Belarus) Yulia Raskina	(Russia) Yulia Barsukova
Corbeil 2000	(Russia) Alina Kabaeva	(France) Eva Serrano	(Belarus) Yulia Raskina
Glasgow 2000	No all-around competition		

=== Rope ===
Competitions	Gold	Silver	Bronze
Corbeil 1999	All-around only		
Bochum 1999	(Belarus) Yulia Raskina	(Russia) Alina Kabaeva	(Belarus) Valeria Vatkina
Osaka 1999	(Ukraine) Olena Vitrychenko	(Russia) Alina Kabaeva	(Russia) Yulia Barsukova
Corbeil 2000	All-around only		
Glasgow 2000	(Russia) Alina Kabaeva	(Russia) Yulia Barsukova	(Russia) Irina Tchachina

=== Hoop ===
Competitions	Gold	Silver	Bronze
Corbeil 1999	All-around only		
Bochum 1999	(Russia) Alina Kabaeva	(Belarus) Yulia Raskina	(Germany) Edita Schaufler
Osaka 1999	(Ukraine) Olena Vitrychenko	(Russia) Alina Kabaeva	(Belarus) Evgenia Pavlina
Corbeil 2000	All-around only		
Glasgow 2000	(Russia) Yulia Barsukova	(Russia) Alina Kabaeva	(Belarus) Yulia Raskina

=== Ball ===
Competitions	Gold	Silver	Bronze
Corbeil 1999	All-around only		
Bochum 1999	(Russia) Alina Kabaeva	(Germany) Edita Schaufler	(Belarus) Valeria Vatkina
Osaka 1999	(Russia) Alina Kabaeva	(Belarus) Yulia Raskina	(Ukraine) Tamara Yerofeeva
Corbeil 2000	All-around only		
Glasgow 2000	(Russia) Alina Kabaeva	(Russia) Yulia Barsukova	(Belarus) Yulia Raskina

=== Ribbon ===
Competitions	Gold	Silver	Bronze
Corbeil 1999	All-around only		
Bochum 1999	(Russia) Alina Kabaeva	(Ukraine) Tamara Yerofeeva	(Russia) Irina Tchachina
Osaka 1999	(Russia) Alina Kabaeva	(Belarus) Yulia Raskina	(Ukraine) Olena Vitrychenko
Corbeil 2000	All-around only		
Glasgow 2000	(Russia) Alina Kabaeva	(Russia) Yulia Barsukova	(Belarus) Yulia Raskina

== See also ==
- 1999–2000 FIG Artistic Gymnastics World Cup series
- 1999 Rhythmic Gymnastics Grand Prix circuit
- 2000 Rhythmic Gymnastics Grand Prix circuit
