= Rhythmic Gymnastics World Cup =

Competition for rhythmic gymnastics

- Sport: Rhythmic gymnastics
- Founded: 1983
- Countries: Worldwide
- Most titles: Russia

The Rhythmic Gymnastics World Cup is a competition for rhythmic gymnastics sanctioned by the Fédération Internationale de Gymnastique (FIG). It is one of the few tournaments in rhythmic gymnastics officially organized by FIG, as well as the World Championships (including the Junior World Championships), the gymnastics competitions at the Olympic Games and the Youth Olympics, and the rhythmic gymnastics events at the World Games. The World Cup series should not be confused with the Rhythmic Gymnastics Grand Prix series, which is neither officially organized nor promoted by FIG.

== History ==
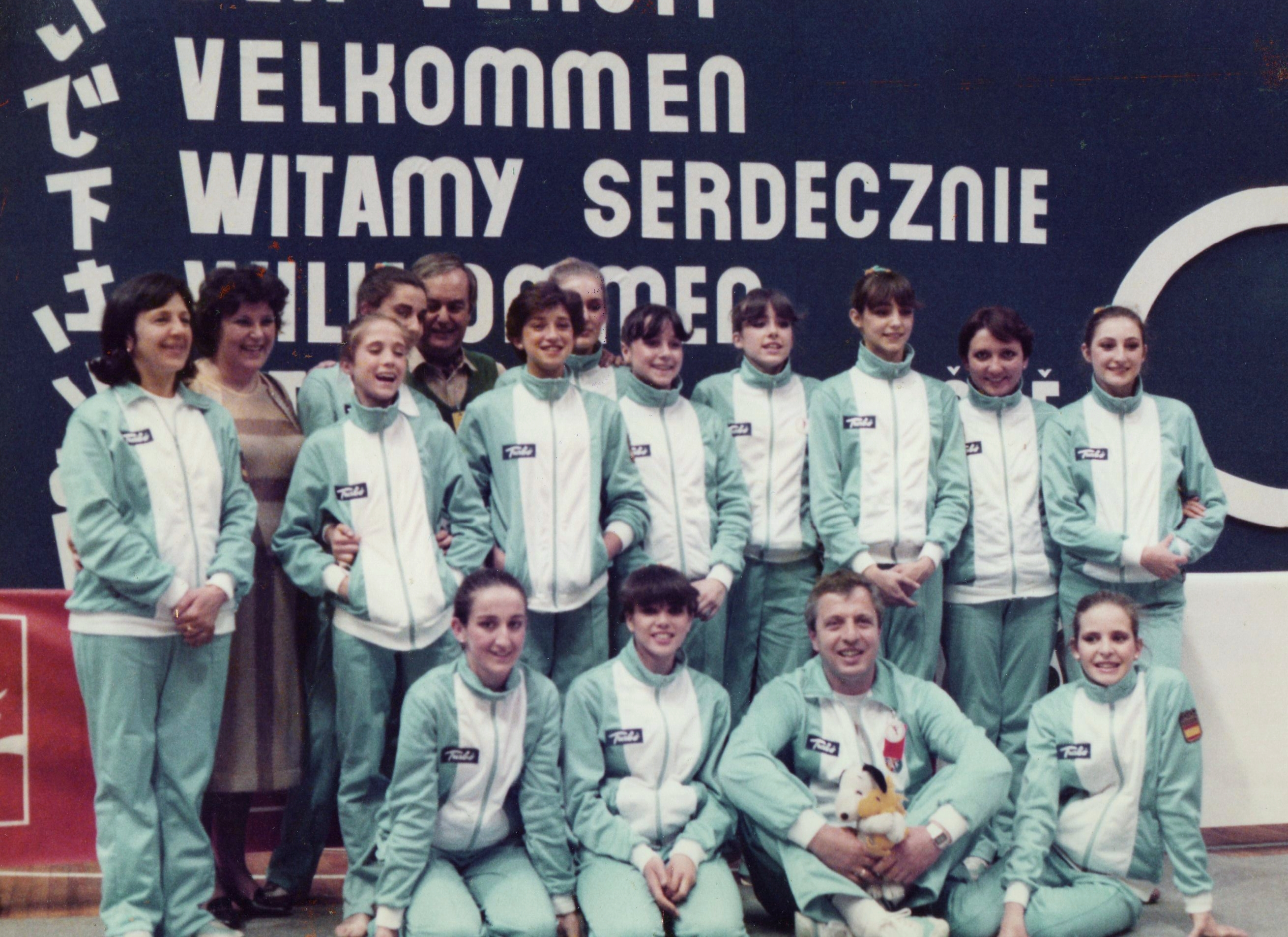
Spanish gymnasts at the 1983 Belgrade World Cup

In 1983, the FIG held the first World Cup event in rhythmic gymnastics. Two further standalone World Cup tournaments were staged in 1983, 1986 and 1990, which have been retroactively called World Cup Finals by the International Gymnastics Federation.

Taking inspiration from the Grand Prix series established in 1994, the FIG Executive Committee made the decision to revive the World Cup in 1999 as a series of tournament which served as qualification stages, over the course of two years, for a World Cup Final event. The different stages, sometimes referred to as World Cup qualifiers, mostly served the purpose to award points for individual gymnasts and groups according to their placement. These points would be added up after a period of two years in order to qualify a limited number of athletes for the biennial World Cup Final event.

Five World Cup Final events were staged in even years from 2000 to 2008. For example, the World Cup Final tournament in 2000 served as the last stage of a series of competitions through the 1999–2000 season. At the World Cup Final, gold, silver and bronze medals were awarded to individual athletes (in four different apparatuses) and groups (in two different routines) after a qualification phase and a final presentation. The World Cup Final format was kept until 2008; the International Gymnastics Federation has decided not to host a single, standalone World Cup Final event after the 2008 World Cup Final.

Since 2009 the World Cup is staged through a series of events held annually, as opposed to the biennial format adopted from 1999 to 2008, or the standalone event format adopted from 1983 to 1990.

== Current format ==
The current format of the World Cup divides the tournament in a series of events staged annually. In each of the stages, the top three gymnasts or groups in each apparatus, as well as in the all-around competition, are awarded medals and prize money. The stages usually attract the best rhythmic gymnasts in the world, with a considerable number of medalists at the Olympic Games and the World Championships competing in each event. The FIG may also allow federations to organize parallel events to the World Cup series, such as junior tournaments. These tournaments, however, are not official FIG competitions and are not considered part of the World Cup Series.

After each stage, gymnasts are awarded points according to their placement (not only in medal positions) in the all-around and each of the four apparatuses. Groups are also awarded points according to placement in the all-around competition and each of the two routines. After the last event of the World Cup series, the 3 or 4 best results at the World Cup stages count towards a ranking list. The same is true for the World Challenge Cup series. The individual gymnast (or group) with the highest number of points in each apparatus (or each routine) is then declared the winner of the World Cup series. A separate ranking also defines the winners in each apparatus (or each routine) of the World Challenge Cup series. Winners receive a cup at the end of the series.

== Events ==
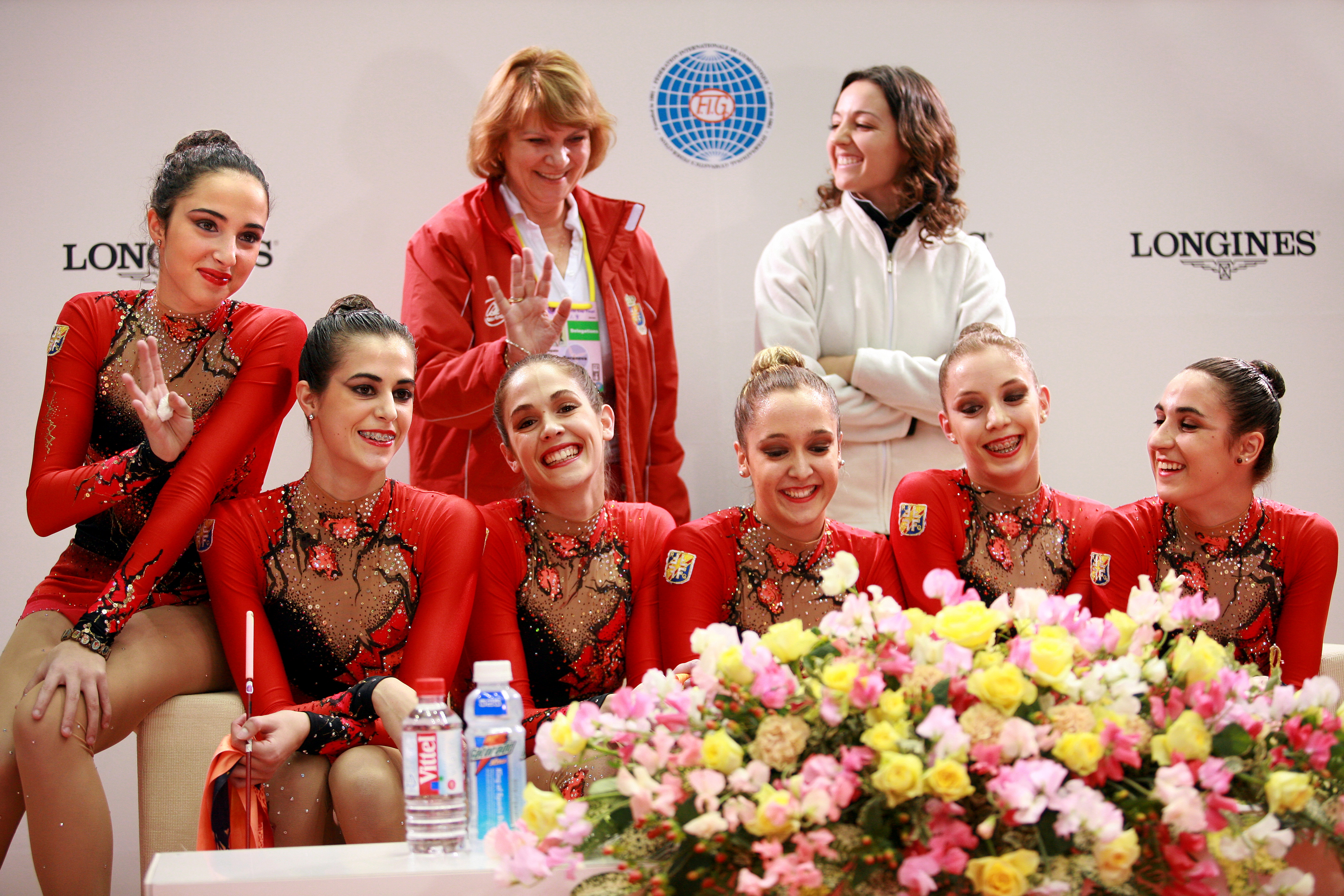
Spanish group at the 2006 Mie World Cup Final

=== World Cup Final ===
There were eight Rhythmic Gymnastics World Cup Finals held between 1983 and 2008. On the first three occasions, 1983, 1986 and 1990, the World Cup was held as a stand-alone event. From 1999 to 2008, each World Cup Final was held in an even-numbered year following a two-year long series that served as the qualification stages for the final event. The first World Cup Final using this format, formally considered the Fourth World Cup Final, was staged in 2000, following the 1999–2000 series; the last World Cup Final took place in 2008, at the end of the 2007–08 series. World Cup Finals are no longer held for any of the FIG disciplines.

Year	Event	Format	Location	Ref.
1983	1st World Cup Final	Individuals and groups	(Socialist Federal Republic of Yugoslavia) Belgrade	
1986	2nd World Cup Final	Individuals and groups	(Japan) Tokyo	
1990	3rd World Cup Final	Individuals and groups	(Belgium) Brussels	
2000	4th World Cup Final	Individuals	(United Kingdom) Glasgow	
2002	5th World Cup Final	Individuals	(Germany) Stuttgart	
2004	6th World Cup Final	Individuals and groups	(Russia) Moscow	
2006	7th World Cup Final	Individuals and groups	(Japan) Mie	
2008	8th World Cup Final	Individuals and groups	(Spain) Benidorm	

=== World Cup qualifiers ===
From 1999 to 2008, a series of World Cup qualifiers were staged. The top 3 gymnasts or groups in each apparatus at the qualifier events would receive medals and prize money. Gymnasts or groups that finished in the top 8 would also receive points that would be added up to a ranking which would qualify individual gymnasts for the biennial World Cup Final.

Years	Series	Format
1999–2000	1999–2000 FIG Rhythmic Gymnastics World Cup series	Individuals
2001–2002	2001–2002 FIG Rhythmic Gymnastics World Cup series	Individuals
2003–2004	2003–2004 FIG Rhythmic Gymnastics World Cup series	Individuals and groups
2005–2006	2005–2006 FIG Rhythmic Gymnastics World Cup series	Individuals and groups
2007–2008	2007–2008 FIG Rhythmic Gymnastics World Cup series	Individuals and groups

=== World Cup series ===
Since 2009, the World Cup has been competed as a series of events held in different countries throughout the period of one year. From 2009 to 2016, the Rhythmic Gymnastics World Cup events were divided into Category A events (reserved for invited athletes only) and Category B events (open to all athletes). The format of the World Cup series was changed in 2017, when it was divided into: 1) the World Cup series; and 2) the World Challenge Cup series. All of the World Cup and World Challenge Cup events are open to all athletes.

Year	Series	Format	Category A events	Category B events	Ref.
2009	2009 FIG Rhythmic Gymnastics World Cup series	Individuals and groups	6	2	
2010	2010 FIG Rhythmic Gymnastics World Cup series	Individuals and groups	6	2	
2011	2011 FIG Rhythmic Gymnastics World Cup series	Individuals and groups	1	9	
2012	2012 FIG Rhythmic Gymnastics World Cup series	Individuals and groups	1	6	
2013	2013 FIG Rhythmic Gymnastics World Cup series	Individuals and groups	1	7	
2014	2014 FIG Rhythmic Gymnastics World Cup series	Individuals and groups	1	8	
2015	2015 FIG Rhythmic Gymnastics World Cup series	Individuals and groups	0	7	
2016	2016 FIG Rhythmic Gymnastics World Cup series	Individuals and groups	0	10	
Year	Series	Format	World Cup events	Challenge Cup events	Ref.
2017	2017 FIG Rhythmic Gymnastics World Cup series	Individuals and groups	4	5	
2018	2018 FIG Rhythmic Gymnastics World Cup series	Individuals and groups	4	4	
2019	2019 FIG Rhythmic Gymnastics World Cup series	Individuals and groups	4	5	
2020	~~2020 FIG Rhythmic Gymnastics World Cup series~~	~~Individuals and groups~~	~~4~~	~~4~~	
2021	2021 FIG Rhythmic Gymnastics World Cup series	Individuals and groups	4	3	
2022	2022 FIG Rhythmic Gymnastics World Cup series	Individuals and groups	5	3	
2023	2023 FIG Rhythmic Gymnastics World Cup series	Individuals and groups	5	2	
2024	2024 FIG Rhythmic Gymnastics World Cup series	Individuals and groups	5	2	
2025	2025 FIG Rhythmic Gymnastics World Cup series	Individuals and groups	4	2	
2026	2026 FIG Rhythmic Gymnastics World Cup series	Individuals and groups	4	3	

== Hosts ==
A number of nations across three different continents have hosted the events, including the World Cup Finals, World Cup qualifiers, as well as the World Cup and World Challenge Cup stages from 1983 to 2026. Notably, the International Gymnastics Federation has never appointed nations from Africa, Oceania and South America as hosts of the World Cup or World Challenge Cup events.

Continent	Nations (Times Hosted)
Asia	China (1), Japan (2), Kazakhstan (1), Uzbekistan (16)
Europe	Azerbaijan (13), Belarus (11), Belgium (1), Bulgaria (18), Estonia (1), Finland (1), France (14), Germany (8), Great Britain (1), Greece (5), Hungary (4), Israel (2), Italy (19), Portugal (18), Romania (9), Russia (22), Slovenia (2), Spain (7), Ukraine (4), Yugoslavia (1)
North America	Canada (2)

== All-time medal table ==
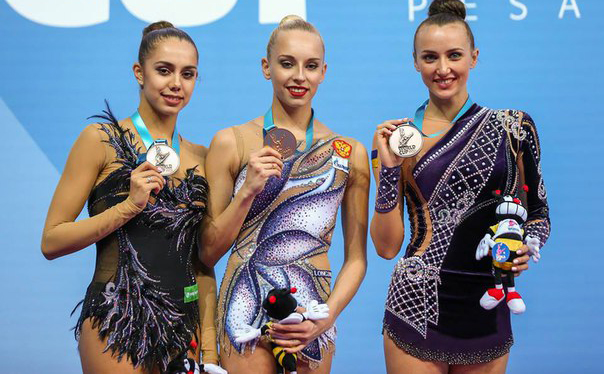
Margarita Mamun, Yana Kudryavtseva and Hanna Rizatdinova at the 2016 Pesaro World Cup

What follows is a table containing the total number of medals earned historically at the World Cup and World Challenge Cup events. Results accounted for include: 1) the eight editions of the World Cup Final from 1983 to 2008; 2) all of the stages from the World Cup series (including World Cup qualifiers from 1999 to 2008) up to 2026; and 3) all of the stages from the World Challenge Cup events, since 2017. Results from the 1999 and 2001 World Championships, events that counted points for the ranking in their respective years, have not been taken into account. Overall, the total number of nations is considerably smaller when compared to the number of nations which earned at least one medal at the Artistic Gymnastics World Cup circuit.

1983–2026
Rank	Nation	Gold	Silver	Bronze	Total
1	Russia	628	382	188	1,198
2	Bulgaria	131	168	129	428
3	Italy	115	104	73	292
4	Ukraine	83	111	125	319
5	Belarus	79	146	241	466
6	Israel	65	82	100	247
7	Germany	51	39	27	117
8	China	24	22	19	65
9	Spain	19	27	40	86
10	Japan	14	22	37	73
11	Uzbekistan	13	26	43	82
12	Soviet Union	9	9	6	24
13	Brazil	8	9	9	26
14	Individual Neutral Athletes 1	7	7	10	24
15	Azerbaijan	6	19	59	84
16	South Korea	6	17	20	43
17	Poland	5	11	20	36
18	Individual Neutral Athletes 2	3	5	3	11
19	Kazakhstan	2	23	38	63
20	Slovenia	2	7	13	22
21	France	2	6	23	31
22	Cyprus	1	4	5	10
23	Greece	1	4	2	7
24	Mexico	1	1	3	5
25	United States	0	10	17	27
26	Finland	0	3	7	10
27	Romania	0	2	4	6
28	Hungary	0	2	2	4
29	Latvia	0	1	2	3
30	Turkey	0	1	0	1
31	Georgia	0	0	4	4
32	Argentina	0	0	1	1
32	Canada	0	0	1	1
32	Estonia	0	0	1	1
32	North Korea	0	0	1	1
32	Switzerland	0	0	1	1
Totals (36 entries)		1,275	1,270	1,274	3,819

== See also ==
- Artistic Gymnastics World Cup
- FIG World Cup
- List of medalists at the FIG World Cup Final
- Rhythmic Gymnastics Grand Prix
