= List of medalists at the Rhythmic Gymnastics Grand Prix circuit (1994–2003) =

Medalists at the Rhythmic Gymnastics Grand Prix circuit (1994–2003)

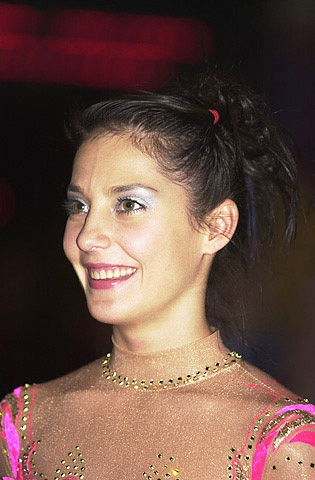
Olena Vitrychenko at the 2000 Deventer Grand Prix

This is a list of medalists in senior individual events at every stage of the Rhythmic Gymnastics Grand Prix circuit from 1994 to 2003. The circuit has been established in 1994 and earning medals in the different stages of the circuit is considered a prestigious achievement in the sport of rhythmic gymnastics. The list includes senior medalists in the regular stages of the circuit, as well as the Grand Prix Final. Group events, either at official Grand Prix competitions or international tournaments held alongside Grand Prix stages, are not covered in this article.

== 1994 ==
=== Events ===
Date	Event	Location	Ref.
April 15–17	DTB-Pokal	(Germany) Karlsruhe	
April 22–24	Gymnastics Masters	(Germany) Ludwigsburg	
May 13–15	Corbeil International	(France) Corbeil-Essonnes	
September 10–11	Grand Prix Final	(Austria) Vienna	

=== Medalists ===
==== Individual all-around ====
Competitions	Gold	Silver	Bronze
Karlsruhe	(Ukraine) Kateryna Serebrianska	(Ukraine) Olena Vitrychenko	(Bulgaria) Maria Petrova
Ludwigsburg	(Bulgaria) Maria Petrova	(Belarus) Larissa Lukyanenko	(Ukraine) Kateryna Serebrianska
Corbeil-Essonnes	(Ukraine) Kateryna Serebrianska	(Russia) Amina Zaripova	(Bulgaria) Maria Petrova
Vienna	(Ukraine) Kateryna Serebrianska	(Ukraine) Olena Vitrychenko	(Russia) Amina Zaripova

==== Hoop ====
Competitions	Gold	Silver	Bronze
Ludwigsburg	(Ukraine) Olena Vitrychenko	(Ukraine) Kateryna Serebrianska	(Russia) Amina Zaripova

==== Ball ====
Competitions	Gold	Silver	Bronze
Ludwigsburg	(Belarus) Larissa Lukyanenko	(Bulgaria) Maria Petrova	(Ukraine) Olena Vitrychenko

==== Clubs ====
Competitions	Gold	Silver	Bronze
Ludwigsburg	(Russia) Amina Zaripova	(Ukraine) Olena Vitrychenko	(Ukraine) Kateryna Serebrianska

==== Ribbon ====
Competitions	Gold	Silver	Bronze
Ludwigsburg	(Ukraine) Kateryna Serebrianska	(Belarus) Larissa Lukyanenko (Belarus) Tatiana Ogrizko	None awarded

== 1995 ==
=== Events ===
Date	Event	Location	Ref.
April 29–30	DTB-Pokal	(Germany) Karlsruhe	
May 20–21	Grand Prix Tournament	(Belgium) Eupen	
May 26–28	Gymnastics Masters	(Germany) Ludwigsburg	
August 25–27	Grand Prix Final: Alfred Vogel Cup	(Netherlands) Deventer	

=== Medalists ===
==== Individual all-around ====
Competitions	Gold	Silver	Bronze
Karlsruhe	(Belarus) Olga Gontar (Ukraine) Kateryna Serebrianska	None awarded	(Ukraine) Olena Vitrychenko
Eupen	(Ukraine) Kateryna Serebrianska	(Belarus) Larissa Lukyanenko	(Russia) Yana Batyrshina (Ukraine) Olena Vitrychenko
Ludwigsburg	(Ukraine) Kateryna Serebrianska	(Belarus) Olga Gontar	(Belarus) Larissa Lukyanenko
Deventer	(Ukraine) Kateryna Serebrianska	(Ukraine) Olena Vitrychenko	(Belarus) Olga Gontar (Russia) Yana Batyrshina

==== Rope ====
Competitions	Gold	Silver	Bronze
Ludwigsburg	(Ukraine) Kateryna Serebrianska	(Belarus) Olga Gontar (Ukraine) Olena Vitrychenko	None awarded
Deventer	(Belarus) Olga Gontar (Russia) Yana Batyrshina (Ukraine) Olena Vitrychenko	None awarded	None awarded

==== Ball ====
Competitions	Gold	Silver	Bronze
Ludwigsburg	(Russia) Amina Zaripova	(Belarus) Olga Gontar (Ukraine) Kateryna Serebrianska	None awarded
Deventer	(Ukraine) Olena Vitrychenko	(Russia) Yana Batyrshina	(Belarus) Larissa Lukyanenko

==== Clubs ====
Competitions	Gold	Silver	Bronze
Ludwigsburg	(Ukraine) Kateryna Serebrianska	(Belarus) Olga Gontar (Ukraine) Olena Vitrychenko	None awarded
Deventer	(Ukraine) Olena Vitrychenko	(Belarus) Larissa Lukyanenko (Russia) Yana Batyrshina	None awarded

==== Ribbon ====
Competitions	Gold	Silver	Bronze
Ludwigsburg	(Ukraine) Kateryna Serebrianska	(Belarus) Olga Gontar	(Russia) Amina Zaripova
Deventer	(Ukraine) Olena Vitrychenko	(Russia) Yana Batyrshina	(Belarus) Olga Gontar

== 1996 ==
=== Events ===
Date	Event	Location	Ref.
April 13–14	International Tournament	(Slovenia) Ljubljana	
April 26–28	DTB-Pokal	(Germany) Karlsruhe	
September 13–15	Alfred Vogel Cup	(Netherlands) Deventer	
September 27–28	Gymnastics Masters	(Germany) Ludwigsburg	
October 19–20	Grand Prix Final	(Austria) Vienna	

=== Medalists ===
==== Individual all-around ====
Competitions	Gold	Silver	Bronze
Ljubljana	(Ukraine) Kateryna Serebrianska	(Belarus) Tatiana Ogrizko (Russia) Yana Batyrshina	None awarded
Karlsruhe	(Belarus) Tatiana Ogrizko	(Belarus) Larissa Lukyanenko	(Russia) Amina Zaripova
Deventer	(Belarus) Tatiana Ogrizko (Ukraine) Olena Vitrychenko	None awarded	(Russia) Yana Batyrshina
Ludwigsburg	(Ukraine) Kateryna Serebrianska	(Belarus) Tatiana Ogrizko	(Ukraine) Olena Vitrychenko
Vienna	(Russia) Yana Batyrshina (Ukraine) Kateryna Serebrianska	None awarded	(Belarus) Tatiana Ogrizko

==== Rope ====
Competitions	Gold	Silver	Bronze
Ludwigsburg	(Ukraine) Kateryna Serebrianska	(Belarus) Larissa Lukyanenko	(Belarus) Tatiana Ogrizko

==== Ball ====
Competitions	Gold	Silver	Bronze
Ludwigsburg	(Ukraine) Kateryna Serebrianska	(Belarus) Tatiana Ogrizko	(Ukraine) Olena Vitrychenko

==== Clubs ====
Competitions	Gold	Silver	Bronze
Ludwigsburg	(Ukraine) Kateryna Serebrianska (Ukraine) Olena Vitrychenko	None awarded	(Belarus) Tatiana Ogrizko

==== Ribbon ====
Competitions	Gold	Silver	Bronze
Ludwigsburg	(Ukraine) Kateryna Serebrianska	(Belarus) Tatiana Ogrizko (Ukraine) Olena Vitrychenko	None awarded

== 1997 ==
=== Events ===
Date	Event	Location	Ref.
March 7–9	Kalamata Cup	(Greece) Kalamata	
March 15–16	Deriugina Cup	(Ukraine) Kyiv	
April 12–13	International Tournament	(Slovenia) Ljubljana	
April 18–19	Gymnastics Masters	(Germany) Ludwigsburg	
May 15–16	DTB-Pokal	(Germany) Karlsruhe	
October 11–12	Grand Prix Final: Alfred Vogel Cup	(Netherlands) Deventer	

=== Medalists ===
==== Individual all-around ====
Competitions	Gold	Silver	Bronze
Kalamata	(Russia) Yana Batyrshina	(Ukraine) Olena Vitrychenko	(Russia) Natalia Lipkovskaya
Kyiv	(Ukraine) Olena Vitrychenko	(Belarus) Tatiana Ogrizko	(Belarus) Evgenia Pavlina
Ljubljana	(Belarus) Tatiana Ogrizko	(Ukraine) Tatiana Popova	(Bulgaria) Boriana Guineva
Ludwigsburg	(Belarus) Evgenia Pavlina	(Ukraine) Tatiana Popova	(Bulgaria) Boriana Guineva
Karlsruhe	(Russia) Amina Zaripova	(Belarus) Valeria Vatkina	(Germany) Lena Asmus
Deventer	(Russia) Natalia Lipkovskaya	(Belarus) Valeria Vatkina	(Germany) Edita Schaufler

==== Rope ====
Competitions	Gold	Silver	Bronze
Kalamata	(Russia) Yana Batyrshina (Russia) Natalia Lipkovskaya (Ukraine) Olena Vitrychenko	None awarded	None awarded
Kyiv	(Ukraine) Olena Vitrychenko	(Belarus) Tatiana Ogrizko	(Belarus) Evgenia Pavlina
Ljubljana	(Belarus) Tatiana Ogrizko (Russia) Yana Batyrshina	None awarded	(Ukraine) Olena Vitrychenko
Ludwigsburg	(Russia) Yana Batyrshina	(Russia) Natalia Lipkovskaya	(Ukraine) Olena Vitrychenko
Karlsruhe	(Ukraine) Olena Vitrychenko	(Belarus) Tatiana Ogrizko	(Germany) Edita Schaufler
Deventer	(Russia) Natalia Lipkovskaya	(Ukraine) Olena Vitrychenko	(Belarus) Tatiana Ogrizko

==== Hoop ====
Competitions	Gold	Silver	Bronze
Kalamata	(Ukraine) Olena Vitrychenko	(Russia) Yana Batyrshina	(Russia) Natalia Lipkovskaya
Kyiv	(Ukraine) Olena Vitrychenko	(Belarus) Tatiana Ogrizko	(Bulgaria) Stela Salapatiyska
Ljubljana	(Ukraine) Olena Vitrychenko	(Belarus) Tatiana Ogrizko (Russia) Yana Batyrshina	None awarded
Ludwigsburg	(Russia) Yana Batyrshina (Ukraine) Olena Vitrychenko	None awarded	(Russia) Natalia Lipkovskaya
Karlsruhe	(Ukraine) Olena Vitrychenko	(Russia) Amina Zaripova	(Ukraine) Tatiana Popova
Deventer	(Russia) Yana Batyrshina (Russia) Natalia Lipkovskaya	None awarded	(Belarus) Tatiana Ogrizko

==== Clubs ====
Competitions	Gold	Silver	Bronze
Kalamata	(Ukraine) Olena Vitrychenko	(Russia) Natalia Lipkovskaya	(Russia) Yana Batyrshina
Kyiv	(Belarus) Tatiana Ogrizko	(Russia) Yana Batyrshina (Ukraine) Olena Vitrychenko	None awarded
Ljubljana	(Belarus) Tatiana Ogrizko	(Ukraine) Olena Vitrychenko	(Russia) Natalia Lipkovskaya
Ludwigsburg	(Russia) Yana Batyrshina	(Belarus) Tatiana Ogrizko	(Russia) Natalia Lipkovskaya
Karlsruhe	(Russia) Amina Zaripova	(Belarus) Tatiana Ogrizko	(Ukraine) Olena Vitrychenko
Deventer	(Ukraine) Olena Vitrychenko	(Russia) Natalia Lipkovskaya	(Ukraine) Tatiana Popova

==== Ribbon ====
Competitions	Gold	Silver	Bronze
Kalamata	(Ukraine) Olena Vitrychenko	(Russia) Yana Batyrshina	(Greece) Maria Pagalou
Kyiv	(Ukraine) Olena Vitrychenko	(Belarus) Tatiana Ogrizko	(Russia) Yana Batyrshina
Ljubljana	(Russia) Yana Batyrshina	(Ukraine) Olena Vitrychenko	(Belarus) Tatiana Ogrizko
Ludwigsburg	(Russia) Yana Batyrshina	(Russia) Natalia Lipkovskaya	(Ukraine) Olena Vitrychenko
Karlsruhe	(Ukraine) Olena Vitrychenko	(Ukraine) Tatiana Popova	(Russia) Amina Zaripova
Deventer	(Russia) Yana Batyrshina	(Russia) Natalia Lipkovskaya	(Ukraine) Olena Vitrychenko

== 1998 ==
=== Events ===
Date	Event	Location	Ref.
March 14–15	Deriugina Cup	(Ukraine) Kyiv	
April 3–5	Donau Cup	(Slovakia) Bratislava	
April 17–18	DTB-Pokal	(Germany) Bochum	
September 5–6	Alfred Vogel Cup	(Netherlands) Deventer	
September 18–21	Grand Prix	(Russia) Moscow	
October 10–11	Grand Prix Final	(Austria) Linz	

=== Medalists ===
==== Individual all-around ====
Competitions	Gold	Silver	Bronze
Kyiv	(Ukraine) Olena Vitrychenko	(Russia) Yana Batyrshina	(Belarus) Evgenia Pavlina
Bratislava	(Ukraine) Olena Vitrychenko	(Russia) Amina Zaripova	(Russia) Yana Batyrshina
Bochum	(Russia) Yana Batyrshina	(Ukraine) Olena Vitrychenko	(Belarus) Yulia Raskina
Deventer	(Russia) Alina Kabaeva	(Ukraine) Olena Vitrychenko	(Belarus) Valeria Vatkina
Moscow	(Russia) Alina Kabaeva	(Russia) Assel Mustafina	(Belarus) Yulia Raskina
Linz	(Russia) Alina Kabaeva	(Ukraine) Olena Vitrychenko	(Belarus) Yulia Raskina

==== Rope ====
Competitions	Gold	Silver	Bronze
Kyiv	(Russia) Yana Batyrshina	(Ukraine) Olena Vitrychenko	(Belarus) Evgenia Pavlina
Bratislava	(Russia) Amina Zaripova	(Russia) Yana Batyrshina	(Belarus) Yulia Raskina
Bochum	(Russia) Yana Batyrshina	(Ukraine) Olena Vitrychenko	(Belarus) Evgenia Pavlina
Deventer	(Russia) Alina Kabaeva	(Belarus) Valeria Vatkina	(Belarus) Yulia Raskina
Moscow	(Russia) Alina Kabaeva	(Belarus) Valeria Vatkina	(Belarus) Yulia Raskina (Russia) Yulia Barsukova
Linz	(Russia) Alina Kabaeva	(Russia) Assel Mustafina	(Ukraine) Olena Vitrychenko

==== Hoop ====
Competitions	Gold	Silver	Bronze
Kyiv	(Ukraine) Olena Vitrychenko	(Russia) Yana Batyrshina	(Belarus) Evgenia Pavlina
Bratislava	(Russia) Yana Batyrshina (Ukraine) Olena Vitrychenko	None awarded	(Russia) Amina Zaripova
Bochum	(Russia) Yana Batyrshina	(Ukraine) Olena Vitrychenko	(Russia) Amina Zaripova
Deventer	(Russia) Alina Kabaeva	(Belarus) Valeria Vatkina	(Ukraine) Olena Vitrychenko
Moscow	(Russia) Alina Kabaeva (Russia) Assel Mustafina	None awarded	(Belarus) Yulia Raskina
Linz	(Russia) Alina Kabaeva	(Ukraine) Olena Vitrychenko	(Belarus) Yulia Raskina

==== Clubs ====
Competitions	Gold	Silver	Bronze
Kyiv	(Russia) Yana Batyrshina	(Ukraine) Olena Vitrychenko	(Russia) Amina Zaripova
Bratislava	(Ukraine) Olena Vitrychenko	(Belarus) Yulia Raskina	(Russia) Amina Zaripova
Bochum	(Ukraine) Olena Vitrychenko	(Belarus) Evgenia Pavlina (Russia) Yana Batyrshina	None awarded
Deventer	(Ukraine) Olena Vitrychenko	(Russia) Alina Kabaeva	(Belarus) Valeria Vatkina
Moscow	(Russia) Alina Kabaeva	(Belarus) Yulia Raskina	(Ukraine) Olena Vitrychenko
Linz	(Russia) Alina Kabaeva	(Belarus) Yulia Raskina	(Russia) Assel Mustafina

==== Ribbon ====
Competitions	Gold	Silver	Bronze
Kyiv	(Russia) Yana Batyrshina	(Ukraine) Olena Vitrychenko	(Russia) Amina Zaripova
Bratislava	(Russia) Yana Batyrshina	(Belarus) Yulia Raskina	(Ukraine) Olena Vitrychenko
Bochum	(Russia) Yana Batyrshina	(Belarus) Evgenia Pavlina	(Russia) Amina Zaripova
Deventer	(Russia) Alina Kabaeva	(Ukraine) Olena Vitrychenko	(Belarus) Valeria Vatkina
Moscow	(Russia) Alina Kabaeva (Russia) Assel Mustafina	None awarded	(Ukraine) Olena Vitrychenko
Linz	(Ukraine) Olena Vitrychenko	(Belarus) Yulia Raskina	(Russia) Assel Mustafina

== 1999 ==
=== Events ===
Date	Event	Location	Ref.
March 12–14	Deriugina Cup	(Ukraine) Kyiv	
March 25–28	Donau Cup	(Slovakia) Bratislava	
April 9–11	Grand Prix	(France) Thiais	
April 16–17	Gymnastics Masters	(Germany) Ludwigsburg	
September 10–12	Alfred Vogel Cup	(Netherlands) Deventer	
October 23–24	Grand Prix	(Russia) Moscow	
November 19–21	Grand Prix Final	(Austria) Korneuburg	

=== Medalists ===
==== Individual all-around ====
Competitions	Gold	Silver	Bronze
Kyiv	(Ukraine) Olena Vitrychenko	(Russia) Alina Kabaeva	(Belarus) Yulia Raskina
Bratislava	(Russia) Alina Kabaeva	(Ukraine) Olena Vitrychenko	(Russia) Yulia Barsukova
Thiais	(Belarus) Yulia Raskina	(Russia) Yulia Barsukova	(Russia) Alina Kabaeva
Ludwigsburg	(Russia) Alina Kabaeva	(Belarus) Yulia Raskina (Ukraine) Olena Vitrychenko	None awarded
Deventer	(Russia) Alina Kabaeva	(Belarus) Yulia Raskina	(Ukraine) Olena Vitrychenko
Moscow	(Russia) Alina Kabaeva	(Belarus) Yulia Raskina	(Ukraine) Olena Vitrychenko
Korneuburg	(Belarus) Yulia Raskina	(Russia) Alina Kabaeva	(Russia) Yulia Barsukova

==== Rope ====
Competitions	Gold	Silver	Bronze
Kyiv	(Ukraine) Olena Vitrychenko	(Russia) Alina Kabaeva	(Russia) Assel Mustafina
Bratislava	(Russia) Alina Kabaeva	(Belarus) Yulia Raskina	(Ukraine) Olena Vitrychenko
Thiais	(Belarus) Yulia Raskina	(Russia) Alina Kabaeva	(Ukraine) Olena Vitrychenko
Ludwigsburg	(Ukraine) Olena Vitrychenko	(Russia) Alina Kabaeva	(Belarus) Yulia Raskina
Deventer	(Russia) Alina Kabaeva	(Russia) Yulia Barsukova	(Belarus) Yulia Raskina
Moscow	(Russia) Alina Kabaeva	(Belarus) Yulia Raskina	(Ukraine) Olena Vitrychenko
Korneuburg	(Ukraine) Olena Vitrychenko	(Russia) Yulia Barsukova	(Ukraine) Tamara Yerofeeva

==== Hoop ====
Competitions	Gold	Silver	Bronze
Kyiv	(Ukraine) Olena Vitrychenko	(Russia) Alina Kabaeva	(Belarus) Yulia Raskina
Bratislava	(Ukraine) Olena Vitrychenko	(Belarus) Yulia Raskina	(Russia) Alina Kabaeva
Thiais	(Ukraine) Olena Vitrychenko	(Belarus) Evgenia Pavlina	(Ukraine) Tamara Yerofeeva
Ludwigsburg	(Ukraine) Olena Vitrychenko	(Belarus) Yulia Raskina	(Russia) Alina Kabaeva
Deventer	(Russia) Alina Kabaeva	(Ukraine) Olena Vitrychenko	(Belarus) Yulia Raskina
Moscow	(Russia) Alina Kabaeva	(Belarus) Yulia Raskina	(Ukraine) Olena Vitrychenko
Korneuburg	(Russia) Alina Kabaeva	(Belarus) Yulia Raskina	(Ukraine) Olena Vitrychenko

==== Ball ====
Competitions	Gold	Silver	Bronze
Kyiv	(Ukraine) Olena Vitrychenko	(Russia) Assel Mustafina	(Belarus) Yulia Raskina
Bratislava	(Russia) Alina Kabaeva	(Russia) Yulia Barsukova	(Ukraine) Olena Vitrychenko
Thiais	(Belarus) Yulia Raskina	(Russia) Alina Kabaeva	(Russia) Yulia Barsukova
Ludwigsburg	(Russia) Alina Kabaeva	(Ukraine) Olena Vitrychenko	(Belarus) Yulia Raskina
Deventer	(Belarus) Yulia Raskina (Ukraine) Olena Vitrychenko	None awarded	(Ukraine) Tamara Yerofeeva
Moscow	(Russia) Alina Kabaeva	(Russia) Yulia Barsukova	(Belarus) Yulia Raskina
Korneuburg	(Russia) Alina Kabaeva	(Belarus) Yulia Raskina	(Russia) Yulia Barsukova

==== Ribbon ====
Competitions	Gold	Silver	Bronze
Kyiv	(Russia) Alina Kabaeva	(Belarus) Yulia Raskina	(Belarus) Valeria Vatkina
Bratislava	(Russia) Alina Kabaeva	(Ukraine) Olena Vitrychenko	(Belarus) Valeria Vatkina
Thiais	(Russia) Alina Kabaeva	(Ukraine) Tamara Yerofeeva	(Russia) Yulia Barsukova
Ludwigsburg	(Ukraine) Olena Vitrychenko	(Belarus) Yulia Raskina	(Ukraine) Tamara Yerofeeva
Deventer	(Russia) Alina Kabaeva	(Ukraine) Olena Vitrychenko	(Belarus) Evgenia Pavlina
Moscow	(Russia) Alina Kabaeva	(Belarus) Yulia Raskina	(Russia) Irina Tchachina (Ukraine) Olena Vitrychenko
Korneuburg	(Russia) Alina Kabaeva	(Russia) Yulia Barsukova	(Belarus) Yulia Raskina

== 2000 ==
=== Events ===
Date	Event	Location	Ref.
March 10–12	Deriugina Cup	(Ukraine) Kyiv	
March 25–26	Grand Prix	(France) Thiais	
April 7–8	Grand Prix	(Germany) Karlsruhe	
September 19–23	Grand Prix	(Russia) Moscow	
November 9–12	Grand Prix Final: Alfred Vogel Cup	(Netherlands) Deventer	

=== Medalists ===
==== Individual all-around ====
Competitions	Gold	Silver	Bronze
Kyiv	(Russia) Alina Kabaeva	(Belarus) Yulia Raskina	(Ukraine) Tamara Yerofeeva
Thiais	(Russia) Alina Kabaeva	(France) Eva Serrano	(Belarus) Yulia Raskina
Karlsruhe	(Russia) Alina Kabaeva	(Belarus) Yulia Raskina	(Russia) Yulia Barsukova
Moscow	(Russia) Alina Kabaeva	(Belarus) Yulia Raskina	(Russia) Yulia Barsukova
Deventer	(Russia) Yulia Barsukova	(Russia) Irina Tchachina	(Ukraine) Tamara Yerofeeva

==== Rope ====
Competitions	Gold	Silver	Bronze
Kyiv	(Russia) Alina Kabaeva	(Belarus) Yulia Raskina	(Russia) Irina Tchachina
Thiais	(Russia) Alina Kabaeva	(Belarus) Yulia Raskina	(France) Eva Serrano
Karlsruhe	(Russia) Alina Kabaeva	(Russia) Yulia Barsukova	(Belarus) Yulia Raskina
Moscow	(Russia) Alina Kabaeva	(Russia) Yulia Barsukova	(Belarus) Yulia Raskina
Deventer	(Russia) Yulia Barsukova	(Ukraine) Tamara Yerofeeva	(Belarus) Yulia Raskina (Russia) Irina Tchachina

==== Hoop ====
Competitions	Gold	Silver	Bronze
Kyiv	(Russia) Alina Kabaeva	(Belarus) Yulia Raskina	(Ukraine) Tamara Yerofeeva
Thiais	(Russia) Yulia Barsukova	(Belarus) Yulia Raskina	(Russia) Alina Kabaeva
Karlsruhe	(Russia) Alina Kabaeva	(Russia) Yulia Barsukova	(Belarus) Yulia Raskina
Moscow	(Russia) Alina Kabaeva	(Belarus) Yulia Raskina	(Ukraine) Tamara Yerofeeva
Deventer	(Belarus) Yulia Raskina	(Ukraine) Tamara Yerofeeva	(Ukraine) Anna Bessonova

==== Ball ====
Competitions	Gold	Silver	Bronze
Kyiv	(Russia) Alina Kabaeva	(Russia) Yulia Barsukova	(Belarus) Yulia Raskina
Thiais	(Russia) Alina Kabaeva	(Belarus) Yulia Raskina	(Russia) Yulia Barsukova
Karlsruhe	(Russia) Alina Kabaeva	(Russia) Yulia Barsukova	(Ukraine) Olena Vitrychenko
Moscow	(Russia) Alina Kabaeva	(Russia) Yulia Barsukova	(Belarus) Yulia Raskina
Deventer	(Russia) Yulia Barsukova	(Belarus) Yulia Raskina	(Russia) Irina Tchachina

==== Ribbon ====
Competitions	Gold	Silver	Bronze
Kyiv	(Russia) Alina Kabaeva	(Ukraine) Tamara Yerofeeva	(Belarus) Yulia Raskina
Thiais	(France) Eva Serrano	(Ukraine) Anna Bessonova	(Russia) Irina Tchachina
Karlsruhe	(Russia) Yulia Barsukova	(Russia) Alina Kabaeva	(Belarus) Yulia Raskina
Moscow	(Russia) Yulia Barsukova	(Belarus) Yulia Raskina	(Russia) Alina Kabaeva
Deventer	(Russia) Yulia Barsukova	(Ukraine) Tamara Yerofeeva	(Belarus) Yulia Raskina (Russia) Alina Kabaeva

== 2001 ==
=== Events ===
Date -	Event	Location	Ref.
March 9–1	Deriugina Cup	(Ukraine) Kyiv	
March 23–25	Gymnastics Masters	(Germany) Ludwigsburg	
March 31–April 1	Internationaux de France	(France) Thiais	
July 27–29	Grand Prix Tournament	(Russia) Moscow	
September 8–9	Mobiltel International Tournament	(Bulgaria) Sofia	
September 28–29	Grand Prix Final: Alfred Vogel Cup	(Netherlands) Deventer	

=== Medalists ===
==== Individual all-around ====
Competitions	Gold	Silver	Bronze
Kyiv	(Russia) Alina Kabaeva	(Russia) Irina Tchachina	(Ukraine) Anna Bessonova
Ludwigsburg	(Russia) Alina Kabaeva	(Ukraine) Anna Bessonova	(Ukraine) Tamara Yerofeeva
Thiais	(Russia) Irina Tchachina	(Russia) Alina Kabaeva	(Ukraine) Anna Bessonova
Moscow	(Russia) Alina Kabaeva	(Russia) Irina Tchachina	(Ukraine) Tamara Yerofeeva
Sofia	(Russia) Irina Tchachina	(Ukraine) Tamara Yerofeeva	(Bulgaria) Simona Peycheva
Deventer	(Russia) Alina Kabaeva	(Russia) Laysan Utiasheva	(Belarus) Elena Tkachenko

==== Rope ====
Competitions	Gold	Silver	Bronze
Kyiv	(Ukraine) Tamara Yerofeeva	(Ukraine) Anna Bessonova	(Russia) Irina Tchachina
Ludwigsburg	(Russia) Alina Kabaeva	(Ukraine) Anna Bessonova	(Ukraine) Tamara Yerofeeva
Thiais	(Russia) Irina Tchachina	(Russia) Alina Kabaeva	(Bulgaria) Simona Peycheva
Moscow	(Russia) Alina Kabaeva	(Ukraine) Tamara Yerofeeva	(Ukraine) Anna Bessonova
Sofia	(Russia) Irina Tchachina	(Ukraine) Tamara Yerofeeva	(Bulgaria) Simona Peycheva
Deventer	(Russia) Laysan Utiasheva	(Russia) Alina Kabaeva	(Bulgaria) Simona Peycheva

==== Hoop ====
Competitions	Gold	Silver	Bronze
Kyiv	(Ukraine) Anna Bessonova	(Russia) Irina Tchachina	(Russia) Alina Kabaeva
Ludwigsburg	(Russia) Alina Kabaeva	(Ukraine) Tamara Yerofeeva	(Belarus) Elena Tkachenko
Thiais	(Russia) Alina Kabaeva	(Ukraine) Anna Bessonova	(Russia) Irina Tchachina
Moscow	(Russia) Alina Kabaeva	(Russia) Irina Tchachina	(Ukraine) Tamara Yerofeeva
Sofia	(Russia) Irina Tchachina	(Ukraine) Tamara Yerofeeva	(Ukraine) Anna Bessonova
Deventer	(Russia) Alina Kabaeva	(Russia) Laysan Utiasheva	(Ukraine) Tamara Yerofeeva

==== Ball ====
Competitions	Gold	Silver	Bronze
Kyiv	(Russia) Alina Kabaeva	(Russia) Irina Tchachina	(Ukraine) Anna Bessonova
Ludwigsburg	(Russia) Alina Kabaeva	(Ukraine) Tamara Yerofeeva	(Ukraine) Anna Bessonova
Thiais	(Russia) Alina Kabaeva	(Russia) Irina Tchachina	(Ukraine) Anna Bessonova
Moscow	(Russia) Alina Kabaeva	(Russia) Irina Tchachina	(Ukraine) Anna Bessonova
Sofia	(Russia) Irina Tchachina	(Ukraine) Tamara Yerofeeva	(Bulgaria) Simona Peycheva
Deventer	(Russia) Alina Kabaeva	(Russia) Laysan Utiasheva	(Belarus) Elena Tkachenko

==== Clubs ====
Competitions	Gold	Silver	Bronze
Kyiv	(Russia) Alina Kabaeva	(Russia) Irina Tchachina	(Ukraine) Anna Bessonova
Ludwigsburg	(Russia) Alina Kabaeva	(Ukraine) Tamara Yerofeeva	(Ukraine) Anna Bessonova
Thiais	(Russia) Alina Kabaeva	(Russia) Irina Tchachina	(Ukraine) Anna Bessonova
Moscow	(Russia) Alina Kabaeva	(Russia) Irina Tchachina	(Ukraine) Tamara Yerofeeva
Sofia	(Russia) Irina Tchachina	(Ukraine) Tamara Yerofeeva	(Russia) Laysan Utiasheva
Deventer	(Russia) Laysan Utiasheva	(Belarus) Elena Tkachenko	(Ukraine) Tamara Yerofeeva

== 2002 ==
=== Events ===
Date	Event	Location	Ref.
March 1–2	Gazprom Grand Prix	(Russia) Moscow	
March 15–16	Kyiv Grand Prix	(Ukraine) Kyiv	
March 22–24	Thiais Grand Prix	(France) Thiais	
September 7–8	Grand Prix Berlin Masters	(Germany) Berlin	
October 4–6	Deventer Grand Prix	(Netherlands) Deventer	
October 18–20	Mtel Grand Prix	(Bulgaria) Sofia	
October 25–27	Holon Grand Prix	(Israel) Holon	
November 22–24	Grand Prix Final: Grand Prix Innsbruck	(Austria) Innsbruck	

=== Medalists ===
==== Individual all-around ====
Competitions	Gold	Silver	Bronze
Moscow	(Russia) Zarina Gizikova	(Bulgaria) Simona Peycheva	(Russia) Laysan Utiasheva
Kyiv	(Ukraine) Tamara Yerofeeva	(Ukraine) Anna Bessonova	(Bulgaria) Simona Peycheva
Thiais	(Russia) Zarina Gizikova	(Russia) Vera Sessina	(Bulgaria) Simona Peycheva
Berlin	(Russia) Irina Tchachina	(Bulgaria) Simona Peycheva	(Russia) Alina Kabaeva
Deventer	(Russia) Irina Tchachina	(Russia) Alina Kabaeva	(Ukraine) Anna Bessonova
Sofia	(Russia) Alina Kabaeva	(Bulgaria) Simona Peycheva	(Russia) Zarina Gizikova
Holon	(Russia) Alina Kabaeva	(Ukraine) Tamara Yerofeeva	(Bulgaria) Simona Peycheva
Innsbruck	(Ukraine) Tamara Yerofeeva	(Ukraine) Anna Bessonova	(Russia) Laysan Utiasheva

==== Rope ====
Competitions	Gold	Silver	Bronze
Moscow	(Russia) Zarina Gizikova	(Bulgaria) Simona Peycheva	(Russia) Olesya Manuylova
Kyiv	(Ukraine) Anna Bessonova	(Ukraine) Tamara Yerofeeva	(Russia) Zarina Gizikova
Thiais	(Bulgaria) Simona Peycheva	(Russia) Vera Sessina	(Russia) Zarina Gizikova
Berlin	(Russia) Alina Kabaeva	(Russia) Irina Tchachina	(Bulgaria) Simona Peycheva
Deventer	(Russia) Irina Tchachina	(Russia) Alina Kabaeva	(Belarus) Inna Zhukova
Sofia	(Russia) Alina Kabaeva	(Bulgaria) Simona Peycheva	(Ukraine) Anna Bessonova
Holon	(Russia) Alina Kabaeva	(Bulgaria) Simona Peycheva	(Ukraine) Tamara Yerofeeva
Innsbruck	(Bulgaria) Simona Peycheva	(Belarus) Inna Zhukova	(Russia) Zarina Gizikova

==== Hoop ====
Competitions	Gold	Silver	Bronze
Moscow	(Russia) Zarina Gizikova	(Ukraine) Tamara Yerofeeva	(Bulgaria) Simona Peycheva
Kyiv	(Ukraine) Tamara Yerofeeva	(Ukraine) Anna Bessonova	(Russia) Vera Sessina
Thiais	(Russia) Zarina Gizikova	(Bulgaria) Simona Peycheva	(Russia) Olesya Manuylova
Berlin	(Russia) Irina Tchachina	(Ukraine) Anna Bessonova	(Ukraine) Tamara Yerofeeva
Deventer	(Russia) Zarina Gizikova	(Russia) Irina Tchachina	(Ukraine) Tamara Yerofeeva
Sofia	(Ukraine) Anna Bessonova	(Ukraine) Tamara Yerofeeva	(Russia) Alina Kabaeva
Holon	(Ukraine) Tamara Yerofeeva	(Russia) Zarina Gizikova	(Russia) Alina Kabaeva
Innsbruck	(Russia) Zarina Gizikova	(Ukraine) Tamara Yerofeeva	(Ukraine) Anna Bessonova

==== Ball ====
Competitions	Gold	Silver	Bronze
Moscow	(Russia) Zarina Gizikova	(Ukraine) Tamara Yerofeeva	(Kazakhstan) Aliya Yussupova
Kyiv	(Ukraine) Anna Bessonova	(Ukraine) Tamara Yerofeeva	(Russia) Vera Sessina
Thiais	(Russia) Zarina Gizikova	(Russia) Vera Sessina	(Spain) Almudena Cid Tostado
Berlin	(Ukraine) Anna Bessonova	(Russia) Irina Tchachina	(Ukraine) Tamara Yerofeeva
Deventer	(Russia) Alina Kabaeva	(Ukraine) Anna Bessonova	(Russia) Zarina Gizikova
Sofia	(Russia) Alina Kabaeva	(Russia) Zarina Gizikova	(Bulgaria) Simona Peycheva
Holon	(Russia) Alina Kabaeva	(Bulgaria) Simona Peycheva	(Ukraine) Tamara Yerofeeva
Innsbruck	(Russia) Zarina Gizikova	(Ukraine) Anna Bessonova	(Ukraine) Tamara Yerofeeva

==== Clubs ====
Competitions	Gold	Silver	Bronze
Moscow	(Ukraine) Tamara Yerofeeva	(Russia) Zarina Gizikova	(Bulgaria) Simona Peycheva
Kyiv	(Ukraine) Tamara Yerofeeva	(Ukraine) Anna Bessonova	(Bulgaria) Simona Peycheva
Thiais	(Russia) Vera Sessina	(Russia) Olesya Manuylova	(Belarus) Elena Tkachenko
Berlin	(Russia) Irina Tchachina	(Russia) Alina Kabaeva	(Ukraine) Anna Bessonova
Deventer	(Russia) Zarina Gizikova	(Russia) Alina Kabaeva	(Ukraine) Anna Bessonova
Sofia	(Russia) Alina Kabaeva	(Ukraine) Anna Bessonova	(Russia) Zarina Gizikova
Holon	(Russia) Alina Kabaeva	(Ukraine) Tamara Yerofeeva	(Russia) Zarina Gizikova
Innsbruck	(Ukraine) Tamara Yerofeeva	(Bulgaria) Simona Peycheva	(Ukraine) Anna Bessonova

== 2003 ==
=== Events ===
Date	Event	Location	Ref.
March 8–9	Gazprom Grand Prix	(Russia) Moscow	
March 15–16	Kyiv Grand Prix	(Ukraine) Kyiv	
June 14–15	Holon Grand Prix	(Israel) Holon	
June 27–29	Grand Prix Berlin Masters	(Germany) Berlin	
August 16–17	Grand Prix for groups	(Bulgaria) Sofia	
August 30–31	Deventer Grand Prix	(Netherlands) Deventer	
September 6–7	Grand Prix Sofia	(Bulgaria) Sofia	
October 17–19	Minsk Grand Prix	(Belarus) Minsk	
November 22–23	Grand Prix Final: Grand Prix Innsbruck	(Austria) Innsbruck	

=== Medalists ===
==== Individual all-around ====
Competitions	Gold	Silver	Bronze
Moscow	(Russia) Vera Sessina	(Russia) Zarina Gizikova	(Ukraine) Anna Bessonova
Kyiv	(Ukraine) Anna Bessonova	(Ukraine) Tamara Yerofeeva	(Ukraine) Natalia Godunko
Holon	(Russia) Vera Sessina	(Ukraine) Anna Bessonova	(Russia) Olga Kapranova
Berlin	(Russia) Alina Kabaeva	(Ukraine) Anna Bessonova	(Belarus) Inna Zhukova
Deventer	(Russia) Alina Kabaeva	(Ukraine) Anna Bessonova	(Russia) Zarina Gizikova
Sofia	(Bulgaria) Simona Peycheva	(Ukraine) Anna Bessonova	(Russia) Vera Sessina
Minsk	(Belarus) Inna Zhukova	(Belarus) Svetlana Rudalova	(Russia) Vera Sessina
Innsbruck	(Ukraine) Anna Bessonova	(Russia) Vera Sessina	(Ukraine) Natalia Godunko

==== Hoop ====
Competitions	Gold	Silver	Bronze
Moscow	(Ukraine) Anna Bessonova	(Russia) Vera Sessina	(Russia) Zarina Gizikova
Kyiv	(Ukraine) Anna Bessonova	(Ukraine) Tamara Yerofeeva	(Belarus) Inna Zhukova
Holon	(Russia) Vera Sessina	(Ukraine) Anna Bessonova	(Russia) Zarina Gizikova
Berlin	(Ukraine) Anna Bessonova	(Ukraine) Tamara Yerofeeva	(Russia) Alina Kabaeva
Deventer	(Russia) Alina Kabaeva	(Ukraine) Anna Bessonova	(Russia) Zarina Gizikova
Sofia	(Ukraine) Anna Bessonova	(Bulgaria) Elizabeth Paisieva	(Bulgaria) Simona Peycheva
Minsk	(Belarus) Svetlana Rudalova	(Russia) Vera Sessina	(Belarus) Inna Zhukova
Innsbruck	(Ukraine) Anna Bessonova	(Russia) Vera Sessina	(Russia) Zarina Gizikova

==== Ball ====
Competitions	Gold	Silver	Bronze
Moscow	(Ukraine) Anna Bessonova	(Russia) Zarina Gizikova	(Bulgaria) Elizabeth Paisieva
Kyiv	(Ukraine) Anna Bessonova	(Russia) Vera Sessina	(Bulgaria) Simona Peycheva
Holon	(Ukraine) Anna Bessonova	(Ukraine) Natalia Godunko	(Belarus) Svetlana Rudalova
Berlin	(Bulgaria) Simona Peycheva	(Russia) Alina Kabaeva	(Ukraine) Anna Bessonova
Deventer	(Russia) Alina Kabaeva	(Ukraine) Anna Bessonova	(Belarus) Inna Zhukova
Sofia	(Ukraine) Anna Bessonova	(Russia) Zarina Gizikova	(Bulgaria) Elizabeth Paisieva
Minsk	(Russia) Olga Kapranova	(Russia) Vera Sessina	(Belarus) Inna Zhukova
Innsbruck	(Russia) Vera Sessina	(Ukraine) Anna Bessonova	(Belarus) Inna Zhukova

==== Clubs ====
Competitions	Gold	Silver	Bronze
Moscow	(Russia) Vera Sessina	(Bulgaria) Simona Peycheva	(Ukraine) Anna Bessonova
Kyiv	(Ukraine) Tamara Yerofeeva	(Ukraine) Anna Bessonova	(Bulgaria) Simona Peycheva
Holon	(Russia) Vera Sessina	(Ukraine) Anna Bessonova	(Belarus) Svetlana Rudalova
Berlin	(Ukraine) Anna Bessonova	(Russia) Alina Kabaeva	(Ukraine) Tamara Yerofeeva
Deventer	(Russia) Alina Kabaeva	(Ukraine) Anna Bessonova	(Belarus) Svetlana Rudalova
Sofia	(Ukraine) Anna Bessonova	(Ukraine) Tamara Yerofeeva	(Russia) Zarina Gizikova
Minsk	(Belarus) Inna Zhukova	(Belarus) Svetlana Rudalova	(Russia) Vera Sessina
Innsbruck	(Russia) Vera Sessina	(Ukraine) Anna Bessonova	(Ukraine) Natalia Godunko

==== Ribbon ====
Competitions	Gold	Silver	Bronze
Moscow	(Russia) Vera Sessina	(Russia) Zarina Gizikova	(Bulgaria) Simona Peycheva
Kyiv	(Ukraine) Anna Bessonova	(Russia) Vera Sessina	(Bulgaria) Simona Peycheva
Holon	(Ukraine) Tamara Yerofeeva	(Ukraine) Natalia Godunko	(Russia) Vera Sessina
Berlin	(Russia) Alina Kabaeva	(Russia) Vera Sessina	(Ukraine) Natalia Godunko
Deventer	(Ukraine) Anna Bessonova	(Russia) Vera Sessina	(Russia) Alina Kabaeva
Sofia	(Russia) Vera Sessina	(Bulgaria) Elizabeth Paisieva	(Bulgaria) Simona Peycheva
Minsk	(Russia) Vera Sessina	(Belarus) Inna Zhukova	(Belarus) Svetlana Rudalova
Innsbruck	(Ukraine) Anna Bessonova	(Ukraine) Natalia Godunko	(Russia) Vera Sessina

== See also ==
- List of medalists at the Rhythmic Gymnastics Grand Prix circuit (2004–2013)
- List of medalists at the Rhythmic Gymnastics Grand Prix circuit (2014–2023)
- List of medalists at the Rhythmic Gymnastics Grand Prix circuit (2024–2033)
