= Tatiana Popova =

Tatiana Popova may refer to:

- Tatiana Popova (basketball)
- Tatiana Popova (gymnast)
