= Vera Shatalina =

Russian Rhythmic gymnastics coach (born 1966)

- Born: Vera Nikolaevna Shatalina; 27 May 1966 (age 60); Tashkent, Uzbek SSR, Soviet Union
- Occupation: Rhythmic gymnastics coach
- Known for: Russian rhythmic gymnastics trainer in the Olympic reserve school for rhythmic gymnastics

Vera Nikolaevna Shatalina (Russian: Вера Николаевна Шаталина; born 27 May 1966) is a Russian Rhythmic gymnastics coach. She is an Honored Coach of Russia and has worked with world and Olympic champions, including Alina Kabaeva, Yulia Barsukova, Olga Kapranova, Diana Borisova, and twin sisters Arina and Dina Averina.

== Competition career ==
Born in Tashkent, Shatalina was a former rhythmic gymnast.

== Coaching career ==
Shatalina in the 1990s became one of the coaches of Russia's Senior National team for individual rhythmic gymnastics. She has trained Olympic champions, World Champions and World Cup champions. She was also the second coach of 2004 Olympic champion Alina Kabaeva.

Shatalina coaches in the Olympic reserve school in the Training center for rhythmic gymnastics in Moscow. Her students include Arina Averina and Dina Averina, whom she has coached since 2011.

== Notable students ==
- Arina Averina – 2017 and 2019 World all-around silver medalist, 2018 and 2021 European all-around champion and 2016 Grand Prix Final all-around bronze medalist.
- Dina Averina – 2020 Olympic Games silver medalist, 4 times World all-around champion, 2018 European all-around silver medalist and 2016 Grand Prix Final all-around silver medalist.
- Yulia Barsukova – 2000 Olympic Games champion, 1999 World all-around bronze medalist and 2000 Grand Prix Final champion.
- Olga Belova – 1999 World Team gold medalist.
- Diana Borisova – 2015 World Group all-around champion and 2015 European Games all-around champion.
- Alina Kabayeva – 2004 Olympic champion, 2000 Olympic bronze medalist, twice World all-around champion and 5 times European all-around champion.
- Olga Kapranova – 2005 World all-around champion, 2007 World all-around bronze medalist, 2008 European all-around bronze medalist.
- Lyasan Utiasheva – World Team gold medalist and 2002 Grand Prix Final all-around bronze medalist.
