= Olga Belova =

Olga Belova may refer to:

- Olga Belova (rhythmic gymnast) (born 1983), Russian rhythmic gymnast
- Olga Belova (water polo) (born 1993), Russian water polo player
- Olga Artemyeva (née Belova), Russian chess player, wife of chess Grandmaster Vladislav Artemiev
