= Tokayev (disambiguation) =

Kassym-Jomart Tokayev is a Kazakh politician and diplomat and the current President of Kazakhstan.

Tokayev, or Tokaev, may also refer to the following people:

- Grigory Tokaev, Soviet scientist and politician
- Or Tokayev, Israeli rhythmic gymnast
- Turpal Tokaev, Russian kickboxer and actor
