= Rieko Matsunaga =

Japanese rhythmic gymnast (born 1979)

- Alternative name: Rieko Saito
- Born: May 19, 1979 (age 47) Tokyo, Japan
- Height: 171 cm (5 ft 7 in)
- Spouse: Yoshihiro Saito

Gymnastics career
- Discipline: Rhythmic gymnastics
- Country represented: Japan
- Retired: 2001

Rieko Saito, née Matsunaga (Japanese: 松永 里絵子; born May 19, 1979) is a Japanese former individual rhythmic gymnast. She was a four-time Japanese national champion and competed at the 2000 Summer Olympics. She now works as a coach and is a board member of the Japan Gymnastics Association.

== Career ==
Matsunaga began rhythmic gymnastics because she enjoyed dancing and wanted to do ballet, but the only similar option in her area were rhythmic gymnastics classes. Her coach was Erika Akiyama. She was a four-time consecutive Japanese champion from 1997 to 2000, and in 2000 also won all four apparatus finals.

At the 1997 Four Continents Championships, she won silver behind teammate Yukari Murata. Later that year, she competed at the 1997 World Championships, where she qualified to the all-around final and placed 18th. The next year, she placed 5th at the 1998 Asian Games. In 1999, she won another silver at the Four Continents Championships behind Murata, and at the 1999 World Championships, she placed 11th.

Matsunaga competed for Japan in the rhythmic gymnastics individual all-around competition at the 2000 Summer Olympics in Sydney. There, she was 16th in the qualification round and did not advance to the final of 10 competitors. She retired from competitive the following year.

== Post-competitive career ==
Matsunaga graduated from the Tokyo Women's College of Physical Education. After her competitive career, she trained as a coach in other countries, including Russia, and performed in an athlete show called "Muscle Musical" in Las Vegas and in cities in Japan. In 2009, she obtained an international judging license and became a coach in Kamo, Niigata, first as an unpaid volunteer and then as a contracted instructor. She said she planned to take an unusual approach to training that combined artistic and rhythmic gymnastics.

In 2025, Matsunaga was elected as a board member of the Japan Gymnastics Association.

== Personal life ==
Matsunaga is married to Yoshihiro Saito, an artistic gymnast who also competed at the 2000 Summer Olympics.
