= Tsyganochka =

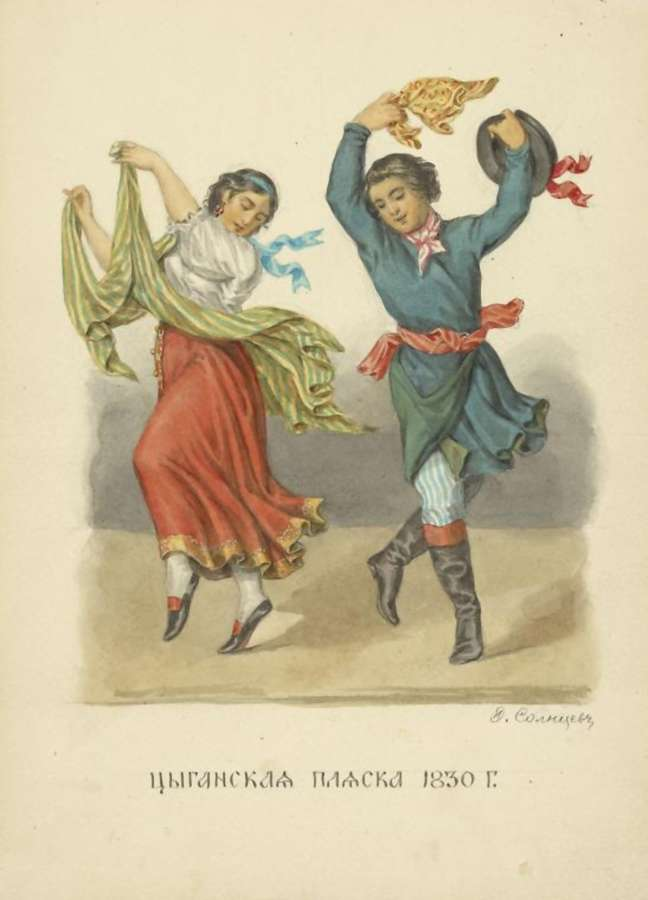
"Gypsy dance", Fedor Solntsev, 1830

Tsyganochka (Russian: Цыганочка, "Gypsy Girl") is a Russian folk dance stylized under the Russian Roma tunes. The music is in minor tonality, unusual in Russian folk dance, in 4/4 time signature.

In the common version called "Цыганочка с выходом" ("Tsyganochka with Entrance"), the tempo is initially slow and then gradually speeds up. During the slow introduction the dancer walks into the dance area, showing off, but without complicated dance figures and then gradually warms up.

== Music ==
The classic melody of Tsyganochka with Entrance was written in the 19th century by the director of a Russian Roma choir and composer Ivan Vasilievich Vasiliev, an ancestor of Nikolay Vasiliev, a singer of Russian Roma songs. He wrote the melody "Цыганская венгерка" ("Gypsy Vengerka", "Hungarian Gypsy Dance") for guitar based on a verse with the same name by Apollon Grigoriev who himself was a great fan of Romani music, which became popular with Russian Roma choirs and based on which a dance was evolved, without particular choreography. Folk added the recognizable refrain "эх раз еще раз еще много-много раз" ("Eh, again, and once more, and many-many more times") into Grigoriev's verse or its variations, sometimes having little common with the original.

== Influence ==
There is a 2008 Russian TV series "Цыганочка с выходом" (Eight episodes).

Vladimir Vysotsky performed a song "Эх, раз, еще раз..." in tsyganochka style in the 1967 film Brief Encounters. He also performed in French ("Rien Ne Va Plus, Rien Ne Va"). The melody of tsyganochka influenced a number of other Vysotsky's songs.
