= Olga Belova (rhythmic gymnast) =

Russian rhythmic gymnast (born 1983)

Olga Vladimirovna Belova
- Born: 22 January 1983 (age 43) Moscow, Russian SFSR, Soviet Union

Gymnastics career
- Discipline: Rhythmic gymnastics
- Country represented: Russia
- Club: MGFSO
- Gym: Novogorsk
- Head coach: Irina Viner
- Assistant coach: Vera Shatalina
- Retired: 2004
Medal record
Representing Russia
Rhythmic Gymnastics
World Championships
Gold medal – first place	1999 Osaka	Team
Disqualified	2001 Madrid	Team
European Championships
Gold medal – first place	2000 Zaragoza	Team
Summer Universiade
Gold medal – first place	2001 Beijing	Clubs
Bronze medal – third place	2001 Beijing	All-around
Bronze medal – third place	2001 Beijing	Rope

Olga Vladimirovna Belova (born 22 January 1983 in Moscow, Russian SFSR, Soviet Union) is a Russian former individual rhythmic gymnast.

== Career ==
Belova won the team gold medal (with Yulia Barsukova, Irina Tchachina and Alina Kabaeva) at the 1999 World Championships in Osaka, Japan and the 2000 European Championships in Zaragoza, Spain.

She competed at the 2001 Summer Universiade in Beijing, where she won bronze in all-around, rope and a gold medal in clubs. She was a member of the Russian team that won gold at the 2001 World Championships in Madrid but they were later disqualified due to Alina Kabaeva and Irina Tchachina testing positive for a banned diuretic.

Belova completed her career in 2004.
