= Susanna Marchesi =

Italian rhythmic gymnast (born 1980)

- Born: 13 March 1980 (age 46)

Gymnastics career
- Discipline: Rhythmic gymnastics
- Country represented: Italy; (1999-2004 (?))

Susanna Marchesi (born 13 March 1980) is a former Italian individual rhythmic gymnast. She represented her nation at international competitions.

She participated at the 2000 Summer Olympics in Sydney. She also competed at world championships, including at the 1999 and 2003 World Rhythmic Gymnastics Championships. She ranked 6th in All-around finals at the 1999 World Rhythmic Gymnastics Championships.
