= Alicia Albe =

American rhythmic gymnast (born 1977)

Alicia (Albe) Bryan
- Alternative name: Alicia Bryan
- Born: May 21, 1977 (age 49) Somerville, New Jersey

Gymnastics career
- Discipline: Rhythmic gymnastics
- Country represented: United States
- Club: Rhythmflex Gymnastics
- Head coach: Yekaterina Yakhimovich
- Assistant coach: Marina Goncharuk

Alicia (Albe) Bryan (born May 21, 1977) competed in rhythmic gymnastics in the 1990s.

Bryan was born in Somerville, New Jersey. Her first performance was in the 1989 Olympic festival, in which she placed 15th. She later competed in many national and international championships, winning only one (the 1996 African Championships), but placing in the top 5 many times. Bryan was selected to compete in the 1996 Olympics, but injured her back and was unable to compete. Her final performance was in the 1997 Rhythmic National Championships in Houston, Texas.
