= Olga Buyanova =

Russian rhythmic gymnast (born 1954)

- Born: Olga Vladimirovna Buyanova; March 27, 1954 (age 72); Irkutsk, RSFSR, USSR
- Education: Omsk Institute of Physical Education / Culture
- Occupation: Rhythmic Gymnastics coach
- Known for: Honored Master of Sports of the USSR, Russian rhythmic gymnastics trainer in Dinamo Irkutsk and Baikal-Arena; coach of multiple Olympic and world medalists
- Spouse: Anatoly Buyanov
- Children: Ilya Buyanov, Viktor Buyanov

Olga Vladimirovna Buyanova (Russian: Ольга Владимировна Буянова; born March 27, 1954, in Irkutsk, RSFSR) is an Honored Master of Sports coach in Rhythmic gymnastics of the USSR and Russia.

== Personal life ==
Olga Vladimirovna is married to Anatoly Buyanov, the director of the Youth Sports School of rhythmic gymnastics in Irkutsk. They have two sons.

== Coaching career ==
Buyanova was the head coach of the Italian national team in rhythmic gymnastics for six years until her departure and return to Irkutsk. She coaches at the sports school for rhythmic gymnastics in Dinamo Irkutsk. In 2013, Buyanova also began coaching at the newly opened Baikal-Arena.

== notable trainees ==
- Daria Dmitrieva - 2012 Olympic silver medalist
- Oxana Kostina - 1992 World All-around champion and 1992 European All-around bronze medalist
- Natalia Lipkovskaya - 1997 World All-around silver medalist
