= Tatiana Popova (gymnast) =

Ukrainian rhythmic gymnast (born 1979)

- Born: 30 July 1979 (age 47) Kyiv, Ukraine
- Height: 168 cm (5 ft 6 in)
- Spouse: Sergiy Dushyn

Gymnastics career
- Discipline: Rhythmic gymnastics
- Country represented: Ukraine; (1987–1999)
- Club: Deriugins School
- Head coach: Irina Deriugina
- Retired: yes
Medal record
Representing Ukraine
Rhythmic Gymnastics
Event	1st	2nd	3rd
World Championships	0	0	5
European Championships	0	1	0
Junior European Championships	0	0	1
Total	0	1	6
World Championships
Bronze medal – third place	1996 Budapest	5 Hoops
Bronze medal – third place	1997 Berlin	Team
Bronze medal – third place	1997 Berlin	Clubs
Bronze medal – third place	1998 Seville	5 Balls
Bronze medal – third place	1998 Seville	3 Ribbons + 2 Hoops
European Championships
Silver medal – second place	1998 Porto	Team
Junior European Championships
Bronze medal – third place	1993 Bucharest	Team

Tatiana Popova (born 30 July 1979) is a former Ukrainian rhythmic gymnast. She's a European and World medalist.

== Career ==
Popova entered the national team in 1987, in 1993 she won team bronze at the European Championships in Bucharest along Victoria Stadnik and Diana Popova.

In 1996 she competed at the World Championships in Budapest as a member of the group finishing 5th in the All-Around, 4th with 3 balls & 2 ribbons and winning bronze with 5 hoops.

The following year she took 8th place in the All-Around and 7th with rope, winning bronze in the team competition and with clubs at the World Championships in Berlin.

In 1998 she won silver in the team competition along Elena Vitrichenko, Ekaterina Serebrianskaya and Tamara Yerofeeva as well as 6th with clubs, the only apparatus she competed with, at the European Championships in Porto. Later Popova was again in the group, at the World Championships in Seville she was 4th in the All-Around and won bronze in the 5 balls and 3 ribbons & 2 hoops' event finals.

In 1999 she was 5th in the All-Around, 4th with 5 pairs of clubs and 8th with 2 hoops & 3 ribbons at the European Championships in Budapest. At the World Championships in Osaka the group finished 10th in the All-Around and didn't qualify for any finals. Ukraine failed to qualify for the 2000 Olympic Games, as a result Tatiana ended her career.

After her retirement she married Sergiy Dushyn and started working in his gymnastics club as a coach.
