= 2000 FIG Rhythmic Gymnastics World Cup Final =

International rhythmic gymnastics competition

The 2000 FIG Rhythmic Gymnastics World Cup Final was the fourth edition of the Rhythmic Gymnastics World Cup Final, held in December 2000 in Glasgow, United Kingdom, at the Braehead Arena. The competition was officially organized by the International Gymnastics Federation under a different format compared to the previous editions. While the first three Rhythmic Gymnastics World Cup tournaments were standalone events, in 1997 the FIG Executive Committee made the decision to hold the 2000 World Cup Final event as the last stage of a series of competitions through the 1999–2000 season.

== Medalists ==
Event	Gold	Silver	Bronze	Ref.
Rope	(Russia) Alina Kabaeva	(Russia) Yulia Barsukova	(Russia) Irina Tchachina	
Hoop	(Russia) Yulia Barsukova	(Russia) Alina Kabaeva	(Belarus) Yulia Raskina	
Ball	(Russia) Alina Kabaeva	(Russia) Yulia Barsukova	(Belarus) Yulia Raskina	
Ribbon	(Russia) Alina Kabaeva	(Russia) Yulia Barsukova	(Belarus) Yulia Raskina	

== Medal table ==
Rank	Nation	Gold	Silver	Bronze	Total
1	Russia (RUS)	4	4	1	9
2	Belarus (BLR)	0	0	3	3
Totals (2 entries)		4	4	4	12

== See also ==
- 2000 Rhythmic Gymnastics Grand Prix circuit
