= 1999 Rhythmic Gymnastics European Championships =

- Location: Budapest, Hungary
- Start date: 28 May 1999
- End date: 30 May 1999

The 15th Rhythmic Gymnastics European Championships were held in Budapest, Hungary from 28 May to 30 May 1999.

== Medal winners ==
Event	Gold	Silver	Bronze
Senior Individual
All-Around	Alina Kabaeva; Russia	Yulia Raskina; Belarus	Eva Serrano; France
Rope	Yulia Barsukova; Russia	Elena Vitrichenko; Ukraine	Alina Kabaeva; Russia
Hoop	Alina Kabaeva; Russia	Yulia Raskina; Belarus	Yulia Barsukova; Russia
Ball	Elena Vitrichenko; Ukraine	Yulia Barsukova; Russia	Eva Serrano; France
Ribbon	Elena Vitrichenko; Ukraine	Alina Kabaeva; Russia	Yulia Raskina; Belarus
Senior Groups
All-Around	Greece	Russia	Belarus
10 Clubs	Greece	Russia	Belarus
3 Ribbons + 2 Hoops	Greece	Russia	Spain
Junior Groups
5 Ropes	Russia	Bulgaria	Greece

== Medal table ==
Rank	Nation	Gold	Silver	Bronze	Total
1	Russia (RUS)	4	5	2	11
2	Greece (GRE)	3	0	1	4
3	Ukraine (UKR)	2	1	0	3
4	Belarus (BLR)	0	2	3	5
5	Bulgaria (BUL)	0	1	0	1
6	France (FRA)	0	0	2	2
7	Spain (ESP)	0	0	1	1
Totals (7 entries)		9	9	9	27
