= Michelle Cameron (gymnast) =

South African rhythmic gymnast

- Full name: Michelle Helen Cameron
- Born: 10 April 1980 (age 46) Pretoria, South Africa

Gymnastics career
- Discipline: Rhythmic gymnastics
- Country represented: South Africa (1994-2000)
- Retired: yes
Medal record
Rhythmic Gymnastics
Representing South Africa
African Championships
Gold medal – first place	1994	Hoop
Gold medal – first place	1994	Ball
Gold medal – first place	1996 Walvis Bay	All-Around
Gold medal – first place	1998	All-Around
Bronze medal – third place	1994	All-Around
African Games
Gold medal – first place	1995 Harare	All-Around
Gold medal – first place	1995 Harare	Ball
Gold medal – first place	1995 Harare	Clubs
Gold medal – first place	1995 Harare	Ribbon
Gold medal – first place	1999 Johannesburg	All-Around
Silver medal – second place	1999 Johannesburg	Team
Bronze medal – third place	1999 Johannesburg	All-Around

Michelle Helen Cameron (born 10 April 1980) is a retired South African rhythmic gymnast.

== Biography ==
Cameron debuted at the 1994 African Championships where she won bronze in the All-Around and gold with hoop and ball. In 1995 she won gold in the All-Around as well as with ball, clubs and ribbon at the African Games in Harare.

She won All-Around gold also at the 1996 African Championships in Walvis Bay and the 1998 edition. At the 1999 African Games, she was a gold medalist in the All-Around, a team silver medalist and a bronze medalist in the first individual All-Around. At national level she was crowned national individual champion in 1996, 1998, and 1999.

Cameron retired in 2000. She became a coach in 2001, working at the Tuks Rhythmic Gymnastics Club and the South African national team. In 1998 she graduated in dance from the National School of the Arts and obtained a Bachelor of Science in medicine in 2004 from the University of Pretoria.
