= Tatiana Popova (basketball) =

Russian basketball player

Personal information
- Born: 17 September 1984 (age 42)
- Listed height: 5 ft 11 in (1.80 m)
- Listed weight: 161 lb (73 kg)

Tatiana Popova (born 17 September 1984) is a Russian professional basketball player. She plays for Russia women's national basketball team. She competed in the 2012 Summer Olympics.
