= 2015 in gymnastics =

The following were the events of gymnastics for the year 2015 throughout the world.

== Artistic gymnastics ==
- March 7 – September 20: 2015 Artistic Gymnastics World Cup, along with the World Challenge Cup
- Note: The Tokyo World Cup is canceled for unknown reasons.
  - March 7: AT&T American Cup at AT&T Stadium in (United States) Arlington, Texas
    - Men's all-around winner: (Ukraine) Oleh Vernyayev
    - Women's all-around winner: (United States) Simone Biles
  - March 19 – 22: 39th Turnier der Meister World Challenge Cup 2015 in (Germany) Cottbus
    - Both Japan and Ukraine won 2 gold and 3 overall medals each.
  - March 25 – 27: World Challenge Cup #1 in (Qatar) Doha
    - Armenia and Switzerland won 2 gold medals each. Romania and Switzerland won 5 overall medals each.
  - April 3 – 5: World Challenge Cup #2 in (Slovenia) Ljubljana
    - The Netherlands won both the gold and overall medal tallies.
  - May 1 – 3: World Challenge Cup #3 in (Brazil) São Paulo
    - China won the gold medal tally. Germany won the overall medal tally.
  - May 7 – 9: World Challenge Cup #4 in (Bulgaria) Varna
    - France won the gold medal tally. Turkey won the overall medal tally.
  - May 21 – 24: World Challenge Cup #5 in (Portugal) Anadia
    - Cuba won both the gold and overall medal tallies.
  - September 17 – 20: World Challenge Cup #6 (final) in (Croatia) Osijek
    - Brazil won both the gold and overall medal tallies.
- April 15 – 19: 2015 European Artistic Gymnastics Championships in (France) Montpellier
  - Russia won both the gold and overall medal tallies.
- July 31 – August 2: 2015 Asian Gymnastics Championships in Hiroshima
  - Men's Individual All-Around winner: (Japan) Ryohei Kato
  - Men's Team All-Around winners: Japan
  - Women's Individual All-Around winner: (Japan) Aiko Sugihara
  - Women's Team All-Around winners: Japan
- October 24 – November 1: 2015 World Artistic Gymnastics Championships in (United Kingdom) Glasgow
  - The United States won both the gold and overall medal tallies.

== Rhythmic gymnastics ==
- March 26 – August 23: 2015 Rhythmic Gymnastics World Cup Series
  - March 26 – 29: World Cup #1 in (Portugal) Lisbon
    - Russia won both the gold and overall medal tallies.
  - April 3 – 5: World Cup #2 (individual events only) in (Romania) Bucharest
    - Russia won all the gold and silver medals for this event, as well as the overall medal tally.
  - April 10 – 12: World Cup #3 in (Italy) Pesaro
    - Russia won both the gold and overall medal tallies.
  - May 22 – 24: World Cup #4 in (Uzbekistan) Tashkent
    - Russia won both the gold and overall medal tallies.
  - August 7 – 9: World Cup #5 in (Hungary) Budapest
    - Russia won both the gold and overall medal tallies.
  - August 14 – 16: World Cup #6 in (Bulgaria) Sofia
    - Russia won all the gold medals in this event and won the overall medal tally, too.
  - August 21 – 23: World Cup #7 (final) in Kazan
    - Russia won all the gold medals in this event and won the overall medal tally, too.
- April 29 – May 3: 2015 Rhythmic Gymnastics European Championships in Minsk
  - Russia won the gold medal tally. Belarus and Russia won 9 overall medals each.
- June 15 – 20: Part of the 2015 European Games in (Azerbaijan) Baku
  - Russia won both the gold and overall medal tallies.
- September 7 – 13: 2015 World Rhythmic Gymnastics Championships in (Germany) Stuttgart
  - Russia won both the gold and overall medal tallies.

== Trampolining/Tumbling ==
- June 5 – October 31: 2015 Trampolining/Tumbling World Cup
  - June 5 & 6: World Cup #1 in Saint Petersburg
    - Men's Individual Trampoline winner: (China) Tu Xiao
    - Women's Individual Trampoline winner: (China) Li Dan
    - Men's Synchronized Trampoline winners: Belarus (Mikalai Kazak & Uladzislau Hancharou)
    - Women's Synchronized Trampoline winners: Russia (Nadezhda Glebova & Susana Kochesok)
    - Men's Individual Tumbling winner: (China) Meng Wenchao
    - Women's Individual Tumbling winner: (China) Jia Fangfang
  - September 11 & 12: World Cup #2 (trampoline events only) in (Spain) Valladolid
    - Men's Individual Trampoline winner: (China) Gao Lei
    - Women's Individual Trampoline winner: (China) Li Dan
    - Men's Synchronized Trampoline winners: Russia (Sergei Azarian, Mikhail Melnik)
    - Women's Synchronized Trampoline winners: China (Li Dan, Zhong Xingping)
  - October 10 & 11: World Cup #3 in (France) Mouilleron-le-Captif
    - Men's Individual Trampoline winner: (China) Gao Lei
    - Women's Individual Trampoline winner: (China) Li Dan
    - Men's Synchronized Trampoline winners: Japan (Masaki Ito, Yasuhiro Ueyama)
    - Women's Synchronized Trampoline winners: China (Li Meng, Liu Lingling)
    - Men's Individual Tumbling winner: (United Kingdom) Greg Townley
    - Women's Individual Tumbling winner: (China) Jia Fangfang
  - October 30 & 31: World Cup #4 (final) in (Portugal) Loulé
    - Men's Individual Trampoline winner: (Belarus) Uladzislau Hancharou
    - Women's Individual Trampoline winner: (Belarus) Tatsiana Piatrenia
    - Men's Synchronized Trampoline winners: France (Allan Morante, Sébastien Martiny)
    - Women's Synchronized Trampoline winners: Belarus (Hanna Harchonak, Tatsiana Piatrenia)
    - Men's Individual Tumbling winner: (Russia) Timofei Podust
    - Women's Individual Tumbling winner: (Russia) Anna Korobeinikova
- November 25 – 29: 2015 Trampoline World Championships in (Denmark) Odense
  - China won both the gold and overall medal tallies.
