= 2014 in gymnastics =

The following were the events of Gymnastics for the year 2014 throughout the world.

- February 21 – December 6: 2014 FIG Calendar

== Artistic gymnastics ==
- March 1: AT&T American Cup World Cup 2014 in (United States) Greensboro, North Carolina
  - Men's winner: (United States) Sam Mikulak
  - Women's winner: (United States) Elizabeth Price
- March 13 – 16: 2014 Turnier der Meister World Challenge Cup (#1) in Cottbus
  - Host nation, Germany won both the gold medal tally. It and Russia tied the overall medal tally, with 5 medals each.
- March 24 – April 1: 2014 African Gymnastics Championships in Pretoria
  - Host nation, South Africa, won the gold medal tally. Egypt won the overall medal tally.
- March 26 – 28: 2014 FIG World Challenge Cup #2 in (Qatar) Doha
  - Romania won both the gold tally. However, it and Armenia tied in the overall medal tally with 4 medals each.
- April 5 & 6: 2014 Tokyo Cup
  - Men: (Japan) Kōhei Uchimura
  - Women: (Italy) Vanessa Ferrari
- April 18 – 20: 2014 FIG World Challenge Cup #3 in Ljubljana
  - Netherlands and host nation, Slovenia, won 3 gold medals each. However, the Netherlands won the overall medal tally.
- April 25 – 27: 2014 FIG World Challenge Cup #4 in Osijek
  - Host nation, Croatia, won the gold medal tally. Croatia, North Korea, and Vietnam won four overall medals each.
- May 29 – June 1: 2014 FIG World Challenge Cup #5 in (Portugal) Anadia
  - The United States won both the gold and overall medal tallies.
- August 17 – 24: 2014 Summer Youth Olympics (artistic)
  - Boys' All-Around Artistic Gymnastics: (gold) (United Kingdom) Giarnni Regini-Moran; (silver) (Russia) Nikita Nagornyy; (bronze) (United States) Alec Yoder
  - Girls' All-Around Artistic Gymnastics: (gold) (Russia) Seda Tutkhalyan; (silver) (Brazil) Flavia Lopes Saraiva; (bronze) (United Kingdom) Elissa Downie
  - Boys' Individual Events: Great Britain and Russia won 3 gold medals and 5 overall medals each.
  - Girls' Individual Events: China and Russia won 2 gold medals each. However, Great Britain won the overall medal tally.
- August 23 & 24: 2014 FIG World Challenge Cup #6 in (Belgium) Ghent
  - Cancelled.
- October 3 – 12: 2014 World Artistic Gymnastics Championships in (China) Nanning
  - The United States won both the gold and overall medal tallies.
- November 7 – 9: 2014 FIG World Challenge Cup #7 (final) in Medellín
  - Brazil won the gold medal tally. Host nation, Colombia, won the overall medal tally.
- November 29 & 30: 2014 FIG EnBW World Cup in Stuttgart
  - Men's All-Around winner: (Ukraine) Oleh Vernyayev
  - Women's All-Around winner: (Romania) Larisa Iordache
  - Men's team winners: Japan
  - Women's team winners: Germany
- December 6: 2014 FIG World Cup in (United Kingdom) Glasgow
  - Men's All-Around winner: (Japan) Yusuke Tanaka
  - Men's Vault winner: (Japan) Yuya Komoto
  - Men's Rings winner: (Japan) Yuya Komoto
  - Men's Pommel Horse winner: (Ukraine) Oleh Vernyayev
  - Men's Parallel Bars winner: (Ukraine) Oleh Vernyayev
  - Men's High Bar winner: (Japan) Yusuke Tanaka
  - Men's Floor winner: (Japan) Yusuke Tanaka
  - Women's All-Around winner: (Romania) Larisa Iordache
  - Women's Vault winner: (Romania) Larisa Iordache
  - Women's Uneven Bars winner: (Venezuela) Jessica López
  - Women's Floor winner: (Romania) Larisa Iordache
  - Women's Beam winner: (Romania) Larisa Iordache
- August 19 – September 1: UPAG American Championships 2014 in (Canada) Mississauga
  - Men's Individual All Around winner: (Colombia) Jossimar Calvo
  - Men's Team All Around winners: (United States) Sean Melton / C. J. Maestas / Marvin Kimble / Jonathan Horton / Brandon Wynn / Eddie Penev
  - Women's Individual All Around winner: (United States) Mykayla Skinner
  - Women's Team All Around winner: (United States) Mykayla Skinner / Maggie Nichols / Madison Desch / Amelia Hundley / Madison Kocian / Ashton Locklear

== Rhythmic gymnastics ==
- 2014 Rhythmic Gymnastics World Cup Series
- February 21 – 24: 2014 Asian Junior Championships in (Malaysia) Kuala Lumpur
  - Uzbekistan won both the gold and overall medal tallies.
- March 14 – 16: 2014 World Cup #1 in (Hungary) Debrecen
  - Overall individual winner: (Russia) Aleksandra Soldatova
  - Overall group winner: Azerbaijan
- March 22 & 23: 2014 Gazprom World Cup (#2) in (Germany) Stuttgart
  - Overall individual winner: (Russia) Yana Kudryavtseva
  - Overall group winner: Russia
- March 24 – April 1: 2014 African Gymnastics Championships
  - Overall individual winner: (South Africa) Grace Legote
  - Overall group winner: Egypt
- April 3 – 6: 2014 World Cup #3 in (Portugal) Lisbon
  - Overall individual winner: (South Korea) Son Yeon-jae
  - Overall group winner: Spain
- April 11 – 13: 2014 World Cup #4 in Pesaro
  - Overall individual winner: (Russia) Yana Kudryavtseva
  - Overall group winner: Italy
- May 9 – 11: 2014 World Cup #5 in (France) Corbeil-Essonnes
  - Overall individual winner: (Russia) Margarita Mamun
- May 22 – 24: 2014 World Cup #6 in (Uzbekistan) Tashkent
  - Overall individual winner: (Russia) Margarita Mamun
  - Overall group winner: Russia
- May 30 – June 1: 2014 BelSwissBank World Cup (#7) in (Belarus) Minsk
  - Overall individual winner: (Russia) Yana Kudryavtseva
  - Overall group winner: Bulgaria
- June 10 – 15: 2014 Rhythmic Gymnastics European Championships in (Azerbaijan) Baku
  - Overall individual winner: (Russia) Yana Kudryavtseva
  - Overall group winner: Russia
- August 9 & 10: 2014 Dundee World Cup (#8) in (Bulgaria) Sofia
  - Overall individual winner: (Russia) Yana Kudryavtseva
  - Overall group winner: Russia
- August 26 & 27: 2014 Summer Youth Olympics (rhythmic)
  - Individual All-Around: (gold) (Russia) Irina Annenkova; (silver) (Belarus) Mariya Trubach; (bronze) (United States) Laura Zeng
  - Group All-Around: (gold) Russia; (silver) Bulgaria; (bronze) Kazakhstan
- September 5 – 7: 2014 World Cup #9 (final) in Kazan
  - Overall individual winner: (Russia) Yana Kudryavtseva
  - Overall group winner: Russia
- September 21 – 28: 2014 World Rhythmic Gymnastics Championships in (Turkey) İzmir
  - Russia won both the gold and overall medal tallies.
- August 19 – September 1: UPAG American Championships 2014 in (Canada) Mississauga
  - Women's Individual All Around winner: (United States) Jasmine Kerber
  - Women's Groups All Around winners: (Brazil) Beatriz Francisco / Elaine Sampaio / Francielly Pereira / Gabrielle Silva / Isadora Silva / Mayra Gmach

== Trampolining/Tumbling ==
- April 9 – 12: 2014 European Trampoline Championships in (Portugal) Guimarães
  - Russia won both the gold and overall medal tallies.
- June 27 & 28: 2014 World Cup #1 in (Switzerland) Arosa
  - Ladies' Open -> Gold: (China) Li Dan; Silver: (Russia) Yana Pavlova; Bronze: (Belarus) Hanna Harchonak
  - Men's Open -> Gold: (China) Tu Xiao; Silver: (Belarus) Uladzislau Hancharou; Bronze: (China) Dong Dong
  - Ladies' Synchro -> Gold: (China) Li Dan & Zhong Xingping; Silver: (Uzbekistan) Ekaterina Khilko & Anna Kasparyan; Bronze: (Belarus) Hanna Harchonak & Maryia Lon
  - Men's Synchro -> Gold: (China) Dong Dong & Tu Xiao; Silver: (Russia) Sergei Azarian & Mikhail Melnik; Bronze: (Poland) Bartlomiej Hes & Lukasz Tomaszewski
- August 21 & 22: 2014 Summer Youth Olympics (trampoline)
  - Boys' Individual: (gold) (New Zealand) Dylan Schmidt; (silver) (China) LIU Changxin; (bronze) (Portugal) Pedro Ribeiro Ferreira
  - Girls' Individual: (gold) (China) ZHU Xueying; (silver) (Japan) Rana Nakano; (bronze) (Russia) Maria Zakharchuk
- September 5 & 6: 2014 World Cup #2 in (Portugal) Loulé
  - Men's Individual -> Gold: (China) GAO Lei; Silver: (China) TU Xiao; Bronze: (Russia) Mikhail Melnik
  - Women's Individual -> Gold: (China) LI Dan; Silver: (United Kingdom) Bryony Page; Bronze: (Japan) Ayana Yamada
  - Men's Synchro -> Gold: (China) Dong Dong and TU Xiao; Silver: (Russia) Mikhail Melnik and Sergei Azarian; Bronze: (Azerbaijan) Ilya Grishunin and Oleg Piunov
  - Women's Synchro -> Gold: (Portugal) Silvia Saiote and Beatriz Martins; Silver: (Switzerland) Fanny Chilo and Sylvie Wirth; Bronze: (Netherlands) Kirsten Boersma and Pascaline Wiebering
  - Men's Individual Tumbling -> Gold: (United Kingdom) Kristof Willerton; Silver: (China) MENG Wenchao; Bronze: (Russia) Grigory Noskov
  - Women's Individual Tumbling -> Gold: (China) JIA Fangfang; Silver: (United Kingdom) Lucie Colebeck; Bronze: (United Kingdom) Racheal Letsche
- September 12 & 13: 2014 World Cup #3 in (Belarus) Minsk
  - Men's Individual -> Gold: (Russia) Dmitry Ushakov; Silver: (Japan) Tetsuya Sotomura; Bronze: (Belarus) Uladzislau Hancharou
  - Women's Individual -> Gold: (United States) Charlotte Drury; Silver: (Belarus) Hanna Harchonak; Bronze: (Belarus) Tatsiana Piatrenia
  - Men's Synchro -> Gold: (Russia) Sergei Azarian and Mikhail Melnik; Silver: (Belarus) Uladzislau Hancharou and Mikalai Kazak; Bronze: (Australia) Shaun and Ty Swadling
  - Women's Synchro -> Gold: (Canada) Rosie MacLennan and Samantha Sendel; Silver: (Portugal) Beatriz Martins and Silvia Saiote; Bronze: (United States) Shaylee Dunavin and Charlotte Drury
  - Men's Individual Tumbling -> Gold: (Russia) Alexandr Mironov; Silver: (Belarus) Dzmitry Darashuk; Bronze: (Canada) Jonathon Schwaiger
  - Women's Individual Tumbling -> Gold: (Canada) Jordan Sugrim; Silver: (Russia) Ekaterina Gaas; Bronze: (Canada) Emily Smith
- November 7 – 9: 2014 Trampoline World Championships in (United States) Daytona Beach, Florida
  - China won both the gold and overall medal tallies.
- August 19 – September 1: UPAG American Championships 2014 in (Canada) Mississauga
  - Men's Individual Trampoline winner: (Canada) Jason Burnett
  - Women's Individual Trampoline winner: (Canada) Rosie MacLennan
