= Or Tokayev =

Israeli rhythmic gymnast

- אור טוקייב
- Alternative names: Svetlana Tokayev; Svetlana Or Tokaev; and Or Tokaev
- Born: November 9, 1979 (age 46) Russian SFSR, Soviet Union
- Height: 5 ft 6 in (168 cm)

Gymnastics career
- Country represented: Israel
- Club: Sport Laam

Or Tokayev, also known as Svetlana Tokayev, Svetlana Or Tokaev, and Or Tokaev, (Hebrew: אור טוקייב; Russian: Светлана Токаев; born November 9, 1979) is an Israeli former Olympic rhythmic gymnast.

== Early life ==
She was born in Soviet Russia. She immigrated to Israel when she was 14 years old, in 1991.

== Rhythmic Gymnastics career ==
Her sports club was Sport Laam.

In 1994, she came in 10th in the European Rhythmic Gymnastics Championships in Team Rhythmic Gymnastics.

She came in 14th in the 1999 World Rhythmic Gymnastics Championships.

She competed for Israel at the 2000 Summer Olympics in Sydney, Australia, when she was 20 was years old in Rhythmic Gymnastics—Women's Individual, and came in 14th. At the time that she competed in the Olympics, she was 5 feet 6 inches (168 cm) tall and weighed 117 pounds (53 kg).
