= Valeria Vatkina =

Belarusian rhythmic gymnast

- Nickname: leria
- Born: 28 March 1981 (age 45) Minsk, Belarus

Gymnastics career
- Discipline: Rhythmic gymnastics
- Country represented: Belarus; (1995-2000)
- Club: Dinamo Minsk
- Head coach: Irina Leparskaya
- Retired: yes
Medal record
Rhythmic gymnastics
Representing Belarus
World Championships
Silver medal – second place	1997 Berlin	Team
Silver medal – second place	1999 Osaka	Team
European Championships
Gold medal – first place	1998 Porto	Team
Silver medal – second place	2000 Zaragoza	Team
Junior European Championships
Gold medal – first place	1995 Prague	All-Around
Silver medal – second place	1995 Prague	Team
Bronze medal – third place	1995 Prague	Ribbon
Grand Prix Final
Silver medal – second place	1997 Deventer	All-around

Valeria Vatkina (born 28 March 1981) is an Individual rhythmic gymnast. She started competitive rhythmic gymnastics in 1986.

== Gymnastics career ==
Born in Minsk, Belarus, Vatkina was the 1995 European Junior All-around Champion and took part with the senior Belarusian team at the 2000 European Championships in Zaragoza, Spain.

Vatkina was twice silver medalist with the Belarusian Team at the World Rhythmic Gymnastics Championships in 1997 Berlin, Germany and 1999 in Osaka, Japan. She placed a podium at the 1997 Grand Prix Final in Deventer, Netherlands after winning the all-around silver medal for Belarus behind Russia's Natalia Lipkovskaya.

Vatkina competed at the 2000 Summer Olympics in Sydney where she qualified in the rhythmic gymnastics All-around finals finishing in 8th place ahead of Spain's Almudena Cid.

== Coaching career ==
Vatkin has coached in Australia at Prahran Rhythmic Gymnastics Centre. She later founded and is the head coach of VV Rhythmic Academy.
