= 2016 in gymnastics =

The following were the events of Gymnastics for the year 2016 throughout the world.

== 2016 Summer Olympics (FIG) ==
- April 16 – 24: Aquece Rio Final Gymnastics Qualifier in (Brazil) Rio de Janeiro (Olympic Test Event)
  - Ukraine won the gold medal tally. Germany won the overall medal tally.
- August 6 – 21: 2016 Summer Olympics in (Brazil) Rio de Janeiro at the Arena Olímpica do Rio
  - August 6 – 16: Artistic gymnastics
    - Men
    - Men's Team All-Around: (gold) Japan; (silver) Russia; (bronze) China
    - Men's Individual All-Around: (gold) (Japan) Kōhei Uchimura; (silver) (Ukraine) Oleg Verniaiev; (bronze) (United Kingdom) Max Whitlock
    - Men's Floor: (gold) (United Kingdom) Max Whitlock; (silver) (Brazil) Diego Hypólito; (bronze) (Brazil) Arthur Mariano
    - Men's Pommel Horse: (gold) (United Kingdom) Max Whitlock; (silver) (United Kingdom) Louis Smith; (bronze) (United States) Alexander Naddour
    - Men's Rings: (gold) (Greece) Eleftherios Petrounias; (silver) (Brazil) Arthur Zanetti; (bronze) (Russia) Denis Ablyazin
    - Men's Vault: (gold) (North Korea) Ri Se-gwang; (silver) (Russia) Denis Ablyazin; (bronze) (Japan) Kenzō Shirai
    - Men's Parallel Bars: (gold) (Ukraine) Oleg Verniaiev; (silver) (United States) Danell Leyva; (bronze) (Russia) David Belyavskiy
    - Men's Horizontal Bar: (gold) (Germany) Fabian Hambüchen; (silver) (United States) Danell Leyva; (bronze) (United Kingdom) Nile Wilson
    - Women
    - Women's Team All-Around: (gold) United States; (silver) Russia; (bronze) China
    - Women's Individual All-Around: (gold) (United States) Simone Biles; (silver) (United States) Aly Raisman; (bronze) (Russia) Aliya Mustafina
    - Women's Balance Beam: (gold) (Netherlands) Sanne Wevers; (silver) (United States) Laurie Hernandez; (bronze) (United States) Simone Biles
    - Women's Floor: (gold) (United States) Simone Biles; (silver) (United States) Aly Raisman; (bronze) (United Kingdom) Amy Tinkler
    - Women's Uneven Bars: (gold) (Russia) Aliya Mustafina; (silver) (United States) Madison Kocian; (bronze) (Germany) Sophie Scheder
    - Women's Vault: (gold) (United States) Simone Biles; (silver) (Russia) Maria Paseka; (bronze) (Switzerland) Giulia Steingruber
  - August 12 & 13: Trampolining
    - Men: (gold) (Belarus) Uladzislau Hancharou; (silver) (China) Dong Dong; (bronze) (China) Gao Lei
    - Women: (gold) (Canada) Rosie MacLennan; (silver) (United Kingdom) Bryony Page; (bronze) (China) Li Dan
  - August 19 – 21: Rhythmic gymnastics
    - Individual All-Around: (gold) (Russia) Margarita Mamun; (silver) (Russia) Yana Kudryavtseva; (bronze) (Ukraine) Ganna Rizatdinova
    - Group All-Around: (gold) Russia; (silver) Spain; (bronze) Bulgaria

== Artistic gymnastics ==
- February 19 – 21: 2016 FIG World Artistic Gymnastics Challenge Cup AGF Trophy (#1) in (Azerbaijan) Baku
  - Japan won both the gold and overall medal tallies.
- March 5: AT&T American Cup World Cup 2016 C II (#2) in (United States) Newark, New Jersey
  - Men's winner: (Japan) Ryōhei Katō
  - Women's winner: (United States) Gabby Douglas
- March 12: World Cup 2016 C II (#3) in (United Kingdom) Glasgow
  - Men's winner: (United Kingdom) Max Whitlock
  - Women's winner: (United States) MyKayla Skinner
- March 19 & 20: EnBW DTB-POKAL World Cup 2016 C II (#4) in Stuttgart
  - World Cup: Germany won both the gold and overall medal tallies.
  - Overall Men's Team Challenge winners: Great Britain
  - Individual Men's Apparatus Team Challenge: Brazil, Great Britain, and Ukraine won 2 gold medals each. Ukraine won the overall medal tally.
  - Overall Women's Team Challenge winners: Russia
  - Individual Women's Apparatus Team Challenge: Switzerland won the gold medal tally. Russia won the overall medal tally.
- March 23 – 26: 2016 African Artistic Gymnastics Championships for Men and Women in Algiers
  - Algeria won both the gold and overall medal tallies.
- March 24 – 26: 9th FIG ART Gymnastics World Challenge Cup (#5) in (Qatar) Doha
  - Switzerland won the gold medal tally. Brazil and Slovenia won 4 overall medals each.
- March 31 – April 4: 40th "TURNIER DER MEISTER" FIG World Challenge Cup (#6) in Cottbus
  - Ukraine won the gold medal tally. Ukraine and Germany won 5 overall medals each.
- April 8 – 10: 12th Ljubljana FIG World Challenge Cup (#7) in Slovenia
  - Slovenia won both the gold and overall medal tallies.
- April 28 – May 1: FIG World Challenge Cup #8 in (Croatia) Osijek
  - Great Britain won the gold medal tally. Russia won the overall medal tally.
- May 13 – 15: FIG World Challenge Cup #9 in (Bulgaria) Varna
  - Ukraine won both the gold and overall medal tallies.
- May 20 – 22: FIG World Challenge Cup #10 in São Paulo
  - Brazil won both the gold and overall medal tallies.
- May 25 – 29: 2016 European Men's Artistic Gymnastics Championships in (Switzerland) Bern
  - Russia won both the gold and overall medal tallies.
- June 1 – 5: 2016 European Women's Artistic Gymnastics Championships in Bern
  - Seniors: Russia and Switzerland won 2 gold medals each. Russia won the overall medal tally.
  - Juniors: Russia won both the gold and overall medal tallies.
- June 23 – 26: FIG World Challenge Cup Artistic Gymnastics (#11) in Anadia, Portugal
  - Brazil and China won 2 gold medals each. China won the overall medal tally.
- July 1 – 3: FIG World Challenge Cup #12 in Mersin
  - Turkey won both the gold and overall medal tallies.
- October 7 – 9: FIG World Challenge Cup #13 (final) in (Hungary) Szombathely
  - China won both the gold and overall medal tallies.
- November 17 – 20: 41st Turnier der Meister FIG Individual Apparatus World Cup 2016 in (Germany) Cottbus
  - Hungary won both the gold and overall medal tallies.

== Rhythmic gymnastics ==
- February 26 – 28: World Cup 2016 Cat. B #1 in (Finland) Espoo
  - All-Around: (Russia) Aleksandra Soldatova
  - Hoop: (Ukraine) Ganna Rizatdinova
  - Ball: (South Korea) Son Yeon-jae
  - Clubs: (Russia) Aleksandra Soldatova
  - Ribbon: (Ukraine) Ganna Rizatdinova
  - Group All-Around: Russia
  - Five-Ribbon Group: Spain
  - Three Clubs and Two Hoops Group: Israel
- March 17 – 20: World Cup 2016 Cat. B #2 in (Portugal) Lisbon
  - All-Around: (Russia) Aleksandra Soldatova
  - Hoop: (Russia) Aleksandra Soldatova
  - Ball: (Russia) Aleksandra Soldatova
  - Clubs: (Ukraine) Ganna Rizatdinova
  - Ribbon: (Ukraine) Ganna Rizatdinova
  - Group All-Around: Russia
  - Five-Ribbon Group: Russia
  - Three Clubs and Two Hoops Group: Russia
- April 1 – 3: World Cup 2016 Cat. B #3 in Pesaro
  - All-Around: (Russia) Yana Kudryavtseva
  - Hoop: (Russia) Margarita Mamun
  - Ball: (Ukraine) Ganna Rizatdinova
  - Clubs: (Russia) Margarita Mamun
  - Ribbon: (Ukraine) Ganna Rizatdinova
  - Five-Ribbon Group: Italy
  - Six Clubs and Two Hoops Group: Italy
- April 28 – May 1: 2016 Asian Junior Rhythmic Gymnastics Championships in Astana
  - Team: Kazakhstan
  - Group: Kazakhstan
  - All-Around: (Japan) Sumire Kita
  - Hoop: (Kazakhstan) Alina Adilkhanova
  - Ball: (Kazakhstan) Alina Adilkhanova
  - Clubs: (Japan) Sumire Kita
  - Ribbon: (Japan) Sumire Kita
- May 13 – 15: World Cup 2016 Cat. B #4 in (Uzbekistan) Tashkent
  - All-Around: (Russia) Yana Kudryavtseva
  - Hoop: (Russia) Yana Kudryavtseva
  - Ball: (Russia) Yana Kudryavtseva
  - Clubs: (Russia) Yana Kudryavtseva
  - Ribbon: (Russia) Yana Kudryavtseva
  - Group All-Around: Russia
  - Five-Ribbon Group: Russia
  - Six Clubs and Two Hoops Group: Belarus
- May 20 – 22: BSB Bank World Cup 2016 Cat. B (#5) in Minsk
  - All-Around: (Russia) Margarita Mamun
  - Hoop: (Russia) Margarita Mamun
  - Ball: (Russia) Margarita Mamun
  - Clubs: (Russia) Margarita Mamun
  - Ribbon: (Russia) Margarita Mamun
  - Group All-Around: Belarus
  - Five-Ribbon Group: Russia
  - Six Clubs and Two Hoops Group: Belarus
- May 27 – 29: World Cup 2016 Cat. B #6 in Sofia
  - All-Around: (Russia) Yana Kudryavtseva
  - Hoop: (Ukraine) Ganna Rizatdinova
  - Ball: (Russia) Yana Kudryavtseva
  - Clubs: (South Korea) Son Yeon-jae
  - Ribbon: (Russia) Yana Kudryavtseva
  - Group All-Around: Russia
  - Five-Ribbon Group: Bulgaria
  - Three Clubs and Two Hoops: Bulgaria
- June 3 – 5: World Cup 2016 Cat. B #7 in (Spain) Guadalajara, Castile-La Mancha
  - All-Around: (Russia) Margarita Mamun
  - Hoop: (Russia) Margarita Mamun
  - Ball: (Russia) Aleksandra Soldatova
  - Clubs: (Russia) Margarita Mamun
  - Ribbon: (Russia) Margarita Mamun
  - Group All-Around: Belarus
  - Five-Ribbon Group: Belarus
  - Six Clubs and Two Hoops: Belarus
- June 17 – 19: 2016 Rhythmic Gymnastics European Championships in Holon
  - All-Around: (Russia) Yana Kudryavtseva
  - Hoop: (Ukraine) Ganna Rizatdinova
  - Ball: (Russia) Margarita Mamun
  - Clubs: (Russia) Margarita Mamun
  - Ribbon: (Russia) Margarita Mamun
  - Group All-Around: Russia
  - Five-Ribbon Group: Belarus
  - Three Clubs and Two Hoops: Israel
- July 1 – 3: Berlin Master 2016. Cat. B (#8) in Germany
  - All-Around: (Russia) Dina Averina
  - Hoop: (Ukraine) Ganna Rizatdinova and (Belarus) Melitina Staniouta (tie)
  - Ball: (Russia) Dina Averina
  - Clubs: (Ukraine) Ganna Rizatdinova
  - Ribbon: (Russia) Dina Averina
  - Group All-Around: Japan
  - Five-Ribbon Group: Japan
  - Three Clubs and Two Hoops: Ukraine
- July 8 – 10: World Cup 2016 Cat. B #9 in Kazan
  - All-Around: (Russia) Margarita Mamun
  - Hoop: (Russia) Yana Kudryavtseva
  - Ball: (Russia) Yana Kudryavtseva
  - Clubs: (Russia) Margarita Mamun
  - Ribbon: (Russia) Margarita Mamun
  - Group All-Around: Russia
  - Five-Ribbon Group: Bulgaria
  - Three Clubs and Two Hoops: Russia
- July 22 – 24: World Cup 2016 Cat. B #10 (final) in (Azerbaijan) Baku
  - All-Around: (Russia) Margarita Mamun
  - Hoop: (Russia) Yana Kudryavtseva
  - Ball: (Russia) Margarita Mamun
  - Clubs: (Russia) Margarita Mamun and (Russia) Yana Kudryavtseva (tie)
  - Ribbon: (Russia) Margarita Mamun and (Russia) Yana Kudryavtseva (tie)
  - Group All-Around: Russia
  - Five-Ribbon Group: Israel
  - Three Clubs and Two Hoops: Russia

== Trampolining/Tumbling ==
- March 5 & 6: AGF Trophy World Cup 2016 Cat. A #1 in (Azerbaijan) Baku
  - Men's individual trampoline winner: (Russia) Dmitry Ushakov
  - Women's individual trampoline winner: (Belarus) Hanna Harchonak
  - Men's synchronized trampoline winners: Russia (Nikita Fedorenko, Dmitry Ushakov)
  - Women's synchronized trampoline winners: Belarus (Hanna Harchonak, Tatsiana Piatrenia)
- March 31 – April 3: 2016 European Trampoline Championships in (Spain) Valladolid
  - Russia won both the gold and overall medal tallies.
- May 14 & 15: World Cup 2016 Cat. A #2 in (China) Shanghai
  - Men's individual trampoline winner: (China) Dong Dong
  - Women's individual trampoline winner: (China) Li Dan
  - Men's synchronized trampoline winners: Poland (Bartlomiej Hes, Lukasz Tomaszewski)
  - Women's synchronized trampoline winners: United States (Dakota Earnest, Shaylee Dunavin)
  - Men's individual tumbling winner: (China) ZHANG Luo
  - Women's individual tumbling winner: (China) JIA Fangfang
- June 18 & 19: World Cup 2016 Cat. A #3 in (Italy) Brescia
  - Men's individual trampoline winner: (China) Dong Dong
  - Women's individual trampoline winner: (China) Li Dan
  - Men's synchronized trampoline winners: Russia (Sergei Azarian, Mikhail Melnik)
  - Women's synchronized trampoline winners: Belarus (Hanna Harchonak, Tatsiana Piatrenia)
- June 24 & 25: World Cup 2016 Cat. A #4 in (Switzerland) Arosa
  - Men's individual trampoline winner: (Russia) Dmitry Ushakov
  - Women's individual trampoline winner: (Canada) Rosie MacLennan
  - Men's synchronized trampoline winners: Japan (Masaki Ito, Ginga Munetomo)
  - Women's synchronized trampoline winners: Russia (Susana Kochesok, Anna Kornetskaya)
- July 8 & 9: World Cup 2016 Cat. A #5 (final) in (Portugal) Coimbra
  - Men's individual trampoline winner: (Belarus) Uladzislau Hancharou
  - Women's individual trampoline winner: (Belarus) Tatsiana Piatrenia
  - Men's synchronized trampoline winners: Russia (Sergei Azarian, Mikhail Melnik)
  - Women's synchronized trampoline winners: Belarus (Hanna Harchonak, Tatsiana Piatrenia)
  - Men's individual tumbling winner: (Denmark) Rasmus Steffensen
  - Women's individual tumbling winner: (Russia) Anna Korobeinikova
