= 1999 World Rhythmic Gymnastics Championships =

- Location: Osaka, Japan
- Start date: 12 October 1999
- End date: 17 October 1999

The 1999 World Rhythmic Gymnastics Championships were held at Osaka Municipal Central Gymnasium in Osaka, Japan on 12–17 October, 1999.

== Overview ==
This was the first Rhythmic Gymnastics World Championships held in Asia.

The Championships acted as a qualifier to the 2000 Summer Olympics, with 19 of the 24 individual and 8 of the 10 group quotas determined at the competition; the last spots were wildcard quotas to be determined by the International Gymnastics Federation (FIG). The top five countries in the team section of the individual qualifier were given two quotas for the Olympics, while the next 9 countries were given one. The top eight groups in the all-around won group quotas.

After the Tokaimura nuclear accident, several parents of teenage gymnasts on the Austrian team demanded that they be returned home, though the FIG and the organizing committee stated that there was no risk. The Austrian Gymnastics Federation flew all of its members home before the competition. While the German team competed, their management withdrew them from two Japanese events they had planned to participate in afterward, the Aeon Cup and another competition in Tokyo.

=== Event results ===
The defending World champion was Ukrainian gymnast Elena Vitrichenko; however, earlier in the year, Alina Kabaeva from Russia had emerged as the new dominant gymnast. Vitrichenko placed 5th, while Kabaeva won the all-around and became the event's most successful gymnast with a total of six medals, four gold, and six perfect 10 scores. Yulia Raskina from Belarus won silver in the all-around, while Russian Yulia Barsukova won bronze. Edita Schaufler qualified for the all-around final in 9th place but withdrew from the final due to an old injury.

In the apparatus finals, Kabaeva won two titles (ribbon and clubs), as did Vitrichenko (rope and hoop) after two perfect 10 scores. Kabaeva also won silver in the rope and hoop finals, while Raskina won silver behind Kabaeva in both the ball and ribbon finals.

Russia won the team event, followed by Belarus and Ukraine.

In the group event, the Russian group won the all-around. The Greek group won silver in the all-around, then finished first in both apparatus finals. The Belarusian group placed 3rd. The Ukrainian group, typically one of the best in the world, placed unexpectedly low. They had several mistakes in their first routine and went into the second routine in only 13th place, after which they ended in 10th.

=== Olympic quotas ===
Russia, Ukraine, Belarus, Spain, and Germany won two individual quotas. Bulgaria, formerly a dominant country in the sport, won only one. Japan, Italy, Poland, France, Israel, China, Hungary, and Canada also won a single individual quota.

Russia, Greece, Belarus, Japan, Germany, Italy, Spain, and France won group berths.

== Medal winners ==
=== Individual ===
Event	Gold	Silver	Bronze
All-around Finals
Team	Russia; Yulia Barsukova; Olga Belova; Alina Kabaeva; Irina Tchachina	Belarus; Elona Ossiadovskaya; Evgenia Pavlina; Yulia Raskina; Valeria Vatkina	Ukraine; Anna Bessonova; Olena Vitrychenko; Tamara Yerofeeva
Individual	Alina Kabaeva; Russia	Yulia Raskina; Belarus	Yulia Barsukova; Russia
Apparatus Finals
Rope	Olena Vitrychenko; Ukraine	Alina Kabaeva; Russia	Yulia Barsukova; Russia
Hoop	Olena Vitrychenko; Ukraine	Alina Kabaeva; Russia	Evgenia Pavlina; Belarus
Ball	Alina Kabaeva; Russia	Yulia Raskina; Belarus	Tamara Yerofeeva; Ukraine
Ribbon	Alina Kabaeva; Russia	Yulia Raskina; Belarus	Olena Vitrychenko; Ukraine

=== Groups ===
Event	Gold	Silver	Bronze
All-around	Russia	Greece	Belarus
10 clubs	Greece	Belarus	Russia
3 ribbons + 2 hoops	Greece	Russia	Belarus

== Participants ==
The following countries sent competitors: Argentina, Australia, Azerbaijan, Belgium, Belarus, Brazil, Bulgaria, Canada, Cape Verde, China, Croatia, Cuba, Cyprus, Czech Republic, Egypt, Estonia, Finland, France, Georgia, Germany, Greece, Hong Kong, Hungary, Israel, Italy, Japan, Kazakhstan, Latvia, Lithuania, Malaysia, Mexico, The Netherlands, New Zealand, Norway, Poland, Portugal, Romania, Russia, Slovakia, Slovenia, South Africa, South Korea, Spain, Sweden, Turkey, Ukraine, The United Kingdom, USA, Uzbekistan, Venezuela and Yugoslavia.

=== Individual entrants ===
- Argentina: Aldana Dicostanzo, Roxana Marinoff, Anahi Sosa, Antonella Yacobelli
- Australia: Danielle Le Ray, Leigh Marning, Bree Robertson
- Azerbaijan: Dinara Nabiyeva, Yelena Knyaginina
- Belarus: Elona Ossiadovskaya, Evgenia Pavlina, Yulia Raskina, Valeria Vatkina
- Belgium: Elke de Backer, Astrid de Mul, Celine Darimont
- Brazil: Gisela Batista, Milena Nagamine, Elise Penedo, Alice Sirangelo
- Bulgaria: Teodora Alexandrova, Viktoria Danova, Proletina Kaltcheva
- Canada: Senka Kovacevic, Emilie Livingstone, Erika-Leigh Stirton
- Cape Verde: Thelma Ramos
- China: Yunfei Pu, Weixiao Want, Ling Zhong
- Croatia: Lea Brlek
- Cuba: Yordania Corrales
- Cyprus: Anthi Kettirou, Maria Kyprianidou, Demetra Sergiou
- Czech Republic: Zaneta Cernohlavkova, Kristyna Kalabova, Leona Siswartonova
- Egypt: Sherin Taami, Yasmin Youssef Adli, Sandra Boghosian, Maha El Kachlan
- Estonia: Irina Kikkas, Karolina Lill, Irina Stadnik
- Finland: Noora Korhonen, Heini Lautala, Laura Pietilainen
- France: Melanie Boisdet, Aurelie Lacour, Eva Serrano, Amelie Villeneuve
- (Georgia (country)) Georgia: Vanda Kereselidze, Inga Tavdishvili
- Germany: Helene Asmus, Edita Schaufler, Monique Strobl
- Greece: Evmorfia Dona
- Hong Kong: Wun Sze Tang, Sze Ling Lee, Wing Chi Chan
- Hungary: Viktoria Frater, Brigitta Haris, Dora Toth
- Israel: Lital Baumwell, Svetlana Tokayev, Ania Shabsis, Hadas Levy
- Italy: Noemi Iezzi, Susanna Marchesi, Laura Zacchilli
- Japan: Mikako Iwamoto, Rieko Matsunaga, Yukari Murata, Ai Yokochi
- Kazakhstan: Valeria Khairoulina, Aida Krasnikova, Elena Rogojina, Oxana Urazayeva
- Latvia: Dace Vende
- Lithuania: Vilma Barauskaite, Natalija Filistovic, Ruta Ziromskaite
- Malaysia: Goh Yi Wei, Celestie Chan, Sarina Sundarajah
- Mexico: Claudia Garcia, Ana Paulina Gonzalez, Aicela Rosado
- The Netherlands: Ramona Stook
- New Zealand: Yvette Keys
- Norway: Ina Berg, Siri Hopperstad, Ida Johansen, Siri Kjeksrud
- Poland: Agnieszka Brandebura, Anna Kwitniewska, Anna Nowak, Aleksandra Zawistowska
- Portugal: Susana Nascimento, Daniela Neto, Liliana Texeira
- Romania: Iulia Moldovan, Gina Patrascu, Raluca Puiu
- Russia: Yulia Barsukova, Olga Belova, Alina Kabaeva, Irina Tchachina
- Slovakia: Zuzana Dobiasova, Eva Filcova, Ivana Morolikova
- Slovenia: Dusica Jeremic, Pia Pustovrh, Ajda Zitnik
- South Africa: Andrea Schermoly, Michelle Cameron, Brigitte Heeb, Cheryl Phillips
- South Korea: Cho Eun-Jung, Choi Ye-Lim, Chung Eun-Ju, Kim Eun-Hae
- Spain: Almudena Cid, Alba Caride Costas, Esther Dominguez
- Sweden: Rebecca Andersson, Johnna Bonow, Matilda Norlander, Elin Nyström
- Turkey: Özlem Atakan, Gözde Erduvan, Demet Tetik
- Ukraine: Anna Bessonova, Tamara Erofeeva, Elena Vitrichenko
- The United Kingdom: Debbie McLarnon, Annabel Brown, Laura Mackie, Melanie Willmott
- The United States: Jessica Howard, Kate Jeffress, Suzanne Pearson
- Uzbekistan: Albina Pavlova
- Venezuela: Nadia Chacon, Elizabeth Veroes
- (Socialist Federal Republic of Yugoslavia) Yugoslavia: Iva Zimonjic

== Individual ==
=== Team All-around ===
Rank	Nation	Rope (rhythmic gymnastics)	Hoop (rhythmic gymnastics)	Ball (rhythmic gymnastics)	Ribbon (rhythmic gymnastics)	Total
1st place, gold medalist(s)	Russia	29.841	29.766	29.833	29.649	119.089
2nd place, silver medalist(s)	Belarus	29.658	29.666	29.682	29.650	118.656
3rd place, bronze medalist(s)	Ukraine	29.566	29.607	29.624	29.525	118.322
4	Germany	29.223	29.000	29.174	29.153	116.550
5	Spain	19.483	19.591	19.474	19.358	77.906
6	Bulgaria	19.616	19.424	19.053	19.499	77.592
7	Italy	9.691	9.708	9.725	9.750	38.874
8	Japan	9.658	9.641	9.791	9.625	38.715

=== Individual All-around ===
Rank	Gymnast	Nation	Rope (rhythmic gymnastics)	Hoop (rhythmic gymnastics)	Ball (rhythmic gymnastics)	Ribbon (rhythmic gymnastics)	Total
1st place, gold medalist(s)	Alina Kabaeva	Russia	9.983	9.958	10.000	9.983	39.924
2nd place, silver medalist(s)	Yulia Raskina	Belarus	9.966	9.933	9.975	9.900	39.774
3rd place, bronze medalist(s)	Yulia Barsukova	Russia	9.933	9.933	9.941	9.916	39.723
4	Eva Serrano	France	9.908	9.908	9.925	9.891	39.632
5	Olena Vitrychenko	Ukraine	9.874	9.908	9.933	9.916	39.631
6	Susanna Marchesi	Italy	9.875	9.900	9.866	9.833	39.474
7	Tamara Yerofeeva	Ukraine	9.883	9.883	9.899	9.750	39.415
8	Teodora Alexandrova	Bulgaria	9.883	9.650	9.925	9.891	39.349
9	Esther Domínguez	Spain	9.800	9.858	9.841	9.850	39.349
10	Rieko Matsunaga	Japan	9.849	9.808	9.874	9.783	39.314
11	Evgenia Pavlina	Belarus	9.775	9.900	9.866	9.766	39.307
12	Almudena Cid Tostado	Spain	9.783	9.866	9.833	9.775	39.257
13	Evmorphia Dona	Greece	9.733	9.858	9.866	9.766	39.223
14	Svetlana Or Tokaev	Israel	9.808	9.783	9.799	9.791	39.181
15	Anna Kwitniewska	Poland	9.783	9.800	9.783	9.800	39.166
16	Viktoria Danova	Bulgaria	9.791	9.824	9.775	9.741	39.131
17	Laura Zacchilli	Italy	9.716	9.775	9.758	9.783	39.032
18	Agnieszka Brandebura	Poland	9.800	9.800	9.658	9.766	39.024
19	Helene Asmus	Germany	9.800	9.733	9.791	9.699	39.023
20	Viktoria Frater	Hungary	9.708	9.783	9.708	9.716	38.915
21	Inga Tavdishvili	Georgia	9.700	9.683	9.741	9.641	38.765
22	Ai Yokochi	Japan	9.658	9.758	9.716	9.566	38.698
23	Wang Weixiao	China	9.699	9.641	9.716	9.608	38.664
24	Jessica Howard	United States	9.599	9.633	9.674	9.658	38.564
25	Lital Baumwel	Israel	9.600	9.645	9.650	9.591	38.486
26	Emilie Livingstone	Canada	9.600	9.624	9.608	9.616	38.448
27	Monique Strobl	Germany	9.666	9.566	9.620	9.553	38.405
28	Heini Lautala	Finland	9.599	9.650	9.399	9.616	38.264
29	Susana Nascimento	Portugal	9.570	9.633	9.599	9.462	38.264
30	Erika-Leigh Stirton	Canada	9.683	9.700	9.183	9.658	38.224

=== Rope ===
Rank	Gymnast	Nation	Score
1st place, gold medalist(s)	Olena Vitrychenko	Ukraine	10.000
2nd place, silver medalist(s)	Alina Kabaeva	Russia	9.966
3rd place, bronze medalist(s)	Yulia Barsukova	Russia	9.925
4	Yulia Raskina	Belarus	9.850
5	Eva Serrano	France	9.825
6	Rieko Matsunaga	Japan	9.766
7	Almudena Cid Tostado	Spain	9.766
8	Susanna Marchesi	Italy	9.675

=== Hoop ===
Rank	Gymnast	Nation	Score
1st place, gold medalist(s)	Olena Vitrychenko	Ukraine	10.000
2nd place, silver medalist(s)	Alina Kabaeva	Russia	9.975
3rd place, bronze medalist(s)	Evgenia Pavlina	Belarus	9.925
4	Tamara Yerofeeva	Ukraine	9.900
5	Eva Serrano	France	9.891
6	Yulia Barsukova	Russia	9.804
7	Evmorfia Dona	Greece	9.800
8	Edita Schaufler	Germany	9.733

=== Ball ===
Rank	Gymnast	Nation	Score
1st place, gold medalist(s)	Alina Kabaeva	Russia	9.966
2nd place, silver medalist(s)	Yulia Raskina	Belarus	9.958
3rd place, bronze medalist(s)	Tamara Yerofeeva	Ukraine	9.925
4	Olga Belova	Russia	9.908
5	Eva Serrano	France	9.875
6	Teodora Alexandrova	Bulgaria	9.783
7	Rieko Matsunaga	Japan	9.766
8	Olena Vitrychenko	Ukraine	9.766

=== Ribbon ===
Rank	Gymnast	Nation	Score
1st place, gold medalist(s)	Alina Kabaeva	Russia	10.000
2nd place, silver medalist(s)	Yulia Raskina	Belarus	9.958
3rd place, bronze medalist(s)	Olena Vitrychenko	Ukraine	9.933
4	Tamara Yerofeeva	Ukraine	9.933
5	Evgenia Pavlina	Belarus	9.916
6	Irina Tchachina	Russia	9.766
7	Svetlana Or Tokaev	Israel	9.758
8	Edita Schaufler	Germany	9.749

== Group ==
=== All-around ===
Rank	Nation	Clubs (rhythmic gymnastics)	+	Total
1st place, gold medalist(s)	Russia	19.700	19.800	39.500
2nd place, silver medalist(s)	Greece	19.700	19.766	39.466
3rd place, bronze medalist(s)	Belarus	19.700	19.733	39.433
4	Japan	19.600	19.616	39.216
5	Germany	19.500	19.600	39.100
6	Italy	19.433	19.666	39.099
7	Spain	19.666	19.366	39.032
8	France	19.600	19.366	38.966
9	Bulgaria	19.350	19.600	38.950
10	Ukraine	19.200	19.566	38.766
11	Switzerland	19.150	19.266	38.416
12	Romania	18.866	19.266	38.132
13	Canada	18.966	19.150	38.116
14	Slovakia	18.983	19.133	38.116
15	China	18.466	19.566	38.032
16	Slovenia	18.850	19.116	37.966
17	Czech Republic	18.800	19.133	37.933
18	Poland	18.933	18.966	37.899
19	North Korea	18.383	19.500	37.883
20	Brazil	18.900	18.950	37.850
21	Finland	18.933	18.883	37.816
22	South Korea	18.633	19.166	37.799
23	Hungary	18.366	18.966	37.332
24	Portugal	18.233	18.933	37.166
25	Australia	18.375	18.516	36.891
26	Argentina	17.650	18.400	36.050

=== 10 Clubs ===
Rank	Nation	T Score	A Score	E Score	Total
1st place, gold medalist(s)	Greece	4.000	6.000	9.816	19.816
2nd place, silver medalist(s)	Belarus	4.000	6.000	9.766	19.766
3rd place, bronze medalist(s)	Russia	4.000	6.000	9.700	19.700
4	Japan	4.000	5.966	9.700	19.666
5	Germany	4.000	6.000	9.566	19.566
6	Spain	4.000	5.933	9.600	19.533
7	Bulgaria	4.000	5.933	9.583	19.516
8	Italy	4.000	5.966	9.500	19.466

=== 3 Ribbons + 2 Hoops ===
Rank	Nation	T Score	A Score	E Score	Total
1st place, gold medalist(s)	Greece	4.000	6.000	9.833	19.833
2nd place, silver medalist(s)	Russia	4.000	6.000	9.783	19.783
3rd place, bronze medalist(s)	Belarus	4.000	6.000	9.716	19.716
4	Japan	4.000	6.000	9.566	19.566
5	France	4.000	5.900	9.550	19.450
6	Spain	4.000	5.883	9.433	19.316
7	Germany	4.000	5.933	9.383	19.216
8	Italy	4.000	5.800	9.350	19.150
