= Natalia Lipkovskaya =

Russian rhythmic gymnast

- Nickname: Natasha
- Born: 26 April 1979 (age 47)
- Height: 176 cm (5 ft 9 in)

Gymnastics career
- Discipline: Rhythmic gymnastics
- Country represented: Russia
- Club: Krasnoyarsk Dynamo
- Head coach: Irina Viner
- Assistant coach: Olga Buyanova
- Retired: yes
Medal record
Representing Russia
Rhythmic Gymnastics
World Championships
| Gold medal – first place | 1995 Vienna | Team |
| Gold medal – first place | 1997 Berlin | Hoop |
| Gold medal – first place | 1997 Berlin | Team |
| Silver medal – second place | 1997 Berlin | Rope |
| Silver medal – second place | 1997 Berlin | Ribbon |
| Silver medal – second place | 1997 Berlin | All-around |
| Bronze medal – third place | 1997 Berlin | Clubs |
European Championships
| Gold medal – first place | 1997 Patras | Clubs |
| Bronze medal – third place | 1996 Asker | Clubs |
Grand Prix Final
| Gold medal – first place | 1997 Deventer | All-around |
| Gold medal – first place | 1997 Deventer | Rope |
| Gold medal – first place | 1997 Deventer | Hoop |
| Silver medal – second place | 1997 Deventer | Clubs |
| Silver medal – second place | 1997 Deventer | Ribbon |

Natalia Lipkovskaya (Russian: Наталья Викторовна Липковская; born 26 April 1979) is a Russian retired individual rhythmic gymnast. She is the 1997 World All-around silver medalist and the 1997 Grand Prix Final All-around champion. She was coached by Olga Buyanova.

== Personal life ==
Lipkovskaya holds a degree in psychology. She now works as a psychologist working for the Russian Rhythmic Gymnastics Federation.

== Career ==
Lipkovskaya began gymnastics training in 1983. She trained at the Dynamo Krasnoyarsk club, coached by Olga Buyanova. She was second in the national championship in 1993 and 1995.

Lipkovskaya made her first international appearance at the 1995 tournament in Corbeil-Essonnes, ranking 7th. At the 1995 World championship in Vienna, she was included on the 1995 Russian team. Although Lipkovskaya won a team gold medal, she did not yet win an individual medal as opposed to her more experienced and recognized teammates Amina Zaripova and Yanina Batyrchina.

In 1996, Lipkovskaya won an international tournament in Portugal and a bronze in one event at the European championship, but missed the 1996 Summer Olympics in favor of her higher-ranking teammates. The Russian national team head coach, Irina Viner, opted to send then-Russian number one and number two Batyrchina and Zaripova to the Olympic competition in Atlanta.

In 1997, following the injury of Amina Zaripova, Lipkovskaya led the Russian national team at the 1997 World championship in Berlin, scoring two gold (hoop and team), three silver (All-around, rope, ribbon) and one bronze (in clubs). She was ranked second in the All-around finals behind Ukrainian Olena Vitrychenko. Lipkovskaya then became the 1997 Grand Prix Final champion in Deventer, Netherlands and in the event finals, she won gold in (rope, hoop); silvers in (clubs, ribbon).

Early in 1998, she began her first in a series of treatments for a recurring back injury. After several hospital stays and a short-lived return to the gym, she decided to end her career.
