= Yulia Barsukova =

Russian rhythmic gymnast 2000 Olympic champion

- Юлия Барсукова
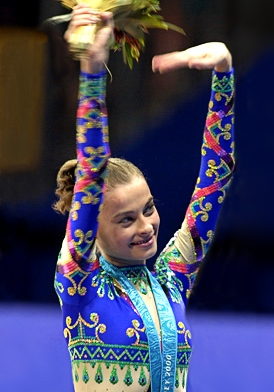
- Barsukova winning the gold medal at Sydney 2000 Olympics

Personal information
- Full name: Yulia Vladimirovna Barsukova
- Alternative name: Julia Barsoukova
- Nickname: Miss Bolshoi
- Born: 31 December 1978 (age 47) Moscow, Russian SFSR, Soviet Union
- Height: 170 cm (5 ft 7 in)

Gymnastics career
- Discipline: Rhythmic gymnastics
- Country represented: Russia
- Club: MGFSO
- Head coach: Irina Viner
- Assistant coach: Vera Shatalina
- Retired: 2000
Medal record
Rhythmic Gymnastics
Representing Russia
Olympic Games
Gold medal – first place	2000 Sydney	All-around
World Championships
Gold medal – first place	1999 Osaka	Team
Bronze medal – third place	1999 Osaka	All-around
Bronze medal – third place	1999 Osaka	Rope
European Championships
Gold medal – first place	1999 Budapest	Rope
Gold medal – first place	2000 Zaragoza	Rope
Gold medal – first place	2000 Zaragoza	Team
Silver medal – second place	1999 Budapest	Ball
Bronze medal – third place	1999 Budapest	Hoop
Bronze medal – third place	2000 Zaragoza	All-around
Bronze medal – third place	2000 Zaragoza	Hoop
Bronze medal – third place	2000 Zaragoza	Ball
European Team Championships
Gold medal – first place	1999 Patras	Team
World Cup Final
Gold medal – first place	2000 Glasgow	Hoop
Silver medal – second place	2000 Glasgow	Rope
Silver medal – second place	2000 Glasgow	Ball
Silver medal – second place	2000 Glasgow	Ribbon
Grand Prix Final
Gold medal – first place	2000 Deventer	All-around
Gold medal – first place	2000 Deventer	Ball
Gold medal – first place	2000 Deventer	Rope
Gold medal – first place	2000 Deventer	Ribbon
Silver medal – second place	1999 Korneuburg	Rope
Silver medal – second place	1999 Korneuburg	Ribbon
Bronze medal – third place	1999 Korneuburg	All-around
Bronze medal – third place	1999 Korneuburg	Ball

Yulia Vladimirovna Barsukova (Russian: Ю́лия Влади́мировна Барсуко́ва, born 31 December 1978) is a Russian retired individual rhythmic gymnast. She is the 2000 Olympic champion in the All-Around, the 2000 Grand Prix Final All-around champion, the 1999 World All-around bronze medalist, 2000 European All-around bronze medalist and 1999 Grand Prix Final All-around bronze medalist.

== Early life ==
Barsukova began figure skating at age five in the Izmaylovo District of Moscow where she lived. When she was eight years old, she passed a sports club and saw girls practicing rhythmic gymnastics through the window. Her father soon enrolled her in the sport. After three years, she moved to Tagansky District high school's rhythmic gymnastics department.

== Competitive career ==
Barsukova was coached by Vera Silaeva until she was sixteen, when Silaeva took her student to Russia's head coach, Irina Viner. Viner was unimpressed initially but accepted her at the urging of Russia's national team choreographer, Veronica Shatkova.

Barsukova began competing at international competitions following the coaching change. For six years she competed under the shadow of other Russian gymnasts, Yanina Batyrchina, Amina Zaripova, Natalia Lipkovskaya and then Alina Kabaeva. Barsukova considered quitting rhythmic gymnastics until Viner persuaded her to stay and be patient. She had her breakthrough in 1998. During an event dedicated to the 15th anniversary of Ballet Magazine, Barsukova performed along with the stars of the theater. She performed her "Dying Swan" ball routine and received the unofficial title of Miss Bolshoi Theater.

=== 2000 Olympics ===
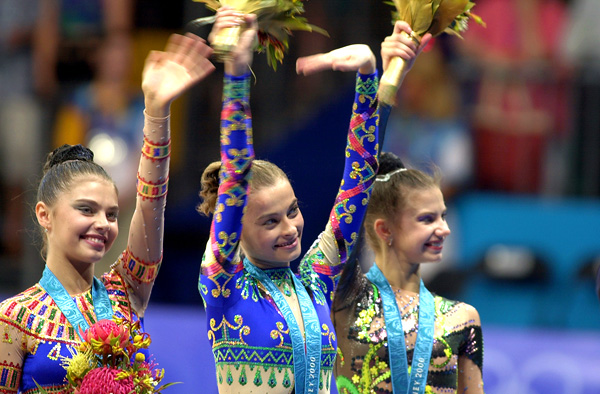
(L-R) Alina Kabaeva (bronze), Yulia Barsukova (gold) and Yulia Raskina (silver) at 2000 Olympic Games Podium

Barsukova won many rhythmic gymnastics titles after her emergence in major competitions as a second member of the Russian team. She won gold in hoop at the 2000 World Cup Final in Glasgow and then gold at the 2000 Sydney Olympics after a hoop fumble by then-World champion, Alina Kabaeva. She was the 2000 European All-around bronze medalist and won the rope final at the 2000 European Championships (9.983). She was the oldest Olympic champion in rhythmic gymnastics—21 years, 8 months and 27 days—until fellow Russian Evgenia Kanaeva won her second gold medal at London 2012 being aged 22 years, 4 months and 7 days.

== Later career ==
After the Olympics, Barsukova won the all-around title at the Grand Prix Final in Deventer where she also won gold in ball, rope and ribbon final. She retired from competition following the 2000 Aeon Cup. She has participated in Russia's Channel One project "Stars on Ice".

On 15 February 2015, a star-studded gala was held in Russia for the 80th founding anniversary of Rhythmic Gymnastics. The venue was held in the historical Mariinsky Theatre in Saint Petersburg. Among those who performed at the gala were Russian former Olympic champions, Olympic medalists and World champions including: Barsukova, Evgenia Kanaeva, Irina Tchachina, Daria Dmitrieva, and Yana Batyrshina.

== Personal life ==
Barsukova was married to Denis Samokhin, a Russian former ice dancer, in 2008 they had a son, Nikita, but they eventually divorced. Barsukova has a son, Daniil, born in 2017.

== Routine music information ==
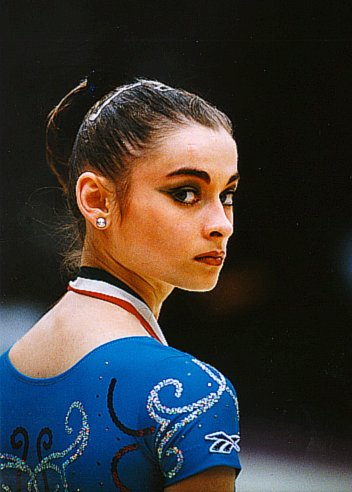
Barsukova at the 1999 European Championships

Year	Apparatus	Music title
2000	Hoop	Nightmare music from Lord of the Dance by Ronan Hardiman
2000	Rope	Breath of Sax by dj dado feat control X
2000	Ball	The Dying Swan music from The Carnival of the Animals by Camille Saint-Saëns
2000	Ribbon	The Feeling Begins (from The Last Temptation of Christ) by Peter Gabriel
1999	Hoop	Introduction: Moderato Assai – Allegro Ma Non Troppo from Swan Lake by Tchaikovsky
1999	Rope	Act I: Danse Generale (Valse-Coda) music from Giselle by Adolphe Adam
1999	Ball	The Dying Swan music from Carnival Of The Animals by Saint-Saëns Camille
1999	Ribbon	The Feeling Begins (from The Last Temptation of Christ) by Peter Gabriel
1998	Hoop	Introduction: Moderato Assai – Allegro Ma Non Troppo from Swan Lake by Tchaikovsky
1998	Clubs	I was born in Mexico / Arabia music from Don Juan de Marco by Michael Kamen
1998	Ball	The Dying Swan music from Carnival Of The Animals by Saint-Saëns Camille
1998	Ribbon	At the Circus / Adagio of Spartacus and Phrygia (from Spartacus) by Aram Khatchaturian
1997	Hoop	?
1997	Clubs	I was born in Mexico / Arabia music from Don Juan de Marco by Michael Kamen
1997	Ball	The Dying Swan music from Carnival Of The Animals by Saint-Saëns Camille
1997	Ribbon	At the Circus / Adagio of Spartacus and Phrygia (from Spartacus) by Aram Khatchaturian
1996	Rope	?
1996	Clubs	I was born in Mexico / Arabia music from Don Juan de Marco by Michael Kamen
1996	Ball	The Dying Swan music from Carnival Of The Animals by Saint-Saëns Camille
1996	Ribbon	?

== Olympics Detail ==
Year	Competition Description	Location	Music	Apparatus	Score-Final	Score-Qualifying
2000	Olympics	Sydney		All-around	39.632	39.600
2000	Olympics	Sydney	The Feeling Begins by Peter Gabriel	Ribbon	9.933	9.900
2000	Olympics	Sydney	The Dying Swan by Saint-Saëns Camille	Ball	9.916	9.900
2000	Olympics	Sydney	Nightmare by Ronan Hardiman	Hoop	9.900	9.900
2000	Olympics	Sydney	Breath of Sax by dj dado feat control X	Rope	9.883	9.900
