= 2013 in gymnastics =

The following were the events of Gymnastics for the year 2013 throughout the world.

== Artistic gymnastics ==
- March 2 – December 7: Artistic Gymnastics World Cup
  - March 2 at (United States) Worcester
    - Men's overall winner: (United States) Jacob Dalton
    - Women's overall winner: (United States) Katelyn Ohashi
  - March 16 & 17 at (France) La Roche-sur-Yon (Individual apparatus)
  - March 21 – 24 at (Germany) Cottbus (Individual apparatus)
  - March 27 – 29 at (Qatar) Doha (Individual apparatus)
  - April 6 & 7 at (Japan) Tokyo
  - April 26 – 28 at (Slovenia) Ljubljana (Individual apparatus)
  - June 21 – 23 at (Portugal) Anadia
  - September 13 – 15 at (Croatia) Osijek
  - November 30 – December 1 at (Germany) Stuttgart
  - December 7 at (United Kingdom) Glasgow
- April 17 – 21: 5th 2013 European Artistic Gymnastics Championships in Moscow
  - Russia won both gold medal and overall medal tallies.
- September 30 – October 6: 2013 World Artistic Gymnastics Championships in Antwerp
  - Japan won the gold medal tally. The United States won the overall medal tally.

== Rhythmic gymnastics ==
- 8 February – 18 August: FIG Rhythmic Gymnastics World Cup
  - 8–10 February at (Estonia) Tartu
    - All-round overall winner: (Ukraine) Ganna Rizatdinova
    - Ball winner: (Belarus) Melitina Staniouta
    - Clubs winner: (Belarus) Melitina Staniouta
    - Hoop winner: (Ukraine) Ganna Rizatdinova
    - Ribbon winner: (Belarus) Melitina Staniouta
  - April 3 – 7 at (Portugal) Lisbon
    - All-round overall winner: (Russia) Margarita Mamun
    - Ball winner: (Russia) Margarita Mamun
    - Clubs winner: (Russia) Margarita Mamun
    - Hoop winner: (Russia) Margarita Mamun
    - Ribbon winner: (Russia) Margarita Mamun
  - April 19 – 21 at (Romania) Bucharest
    - All-round overall winner: (Belarus) Melitina Staniouta
    - Ball winner: (Belarus) Melitina Staniouta
    - Clubs winner: (Russia) Daria Svatkovskaya
    - Hoop winner: (Russia) Maria Titova
    - Ribbon winner: (Belarus) Melitina Staniouta and (Russia) Daria Svatkovskaya in a tie
  - April 26 – 28 at (Italy) Pesaro
    - All-round overall winner: (Belarus) Melitina Staniouta
    - Ball winner: (Belarus) Melitina Staniouta
    - Clubs winner: (Belarus) Melitina Staniouta
    - Hoop winner: (Russia) Daria Svatkovskaya
    - Ribbon winner: (Belarus) Melitina Staniouta
  - May 4 & 5 at (Bulgaria) Sofia
    - All-round overall winner: (Russia) Yana Kudryavtseva
    - Ball winner: (Russia) Margarita Mamun
    - Clubs winner: (Russia) Yana Kudryavtseva
    - Hoop winner: (Russia) Yana Kudryavtseva
    - Ribbon winner: (Bulgaria) Sylvia Miteva
  - May 10 – 12 at (France) Corbeil-Essonnes
    - All-round overall winner: (Ukraine) Ganna Rizatdinova
    - Ball winner: (Russia) Margarita Mamun
    - Clubs winner: (Ukraine) Ganna Rizatdinova
    - Hoop winner: (Russia) Margarita Mamun
    - Ribbon winner: (Russia) Margarita Mamun
  - May 17 – 19 at (Belarus) Minsk
    - All-round overall winner: (Russia) Yana Kudryavtseva
    - Ball winner: (Russia) Yana Kudryavtseva
    - Clubs winner: (Belarus) Melitina Staniouta
    - Hoop winner: (Russia) Daria Svatkovskaya
    - Ribbon winner: (Belarus) Melitina Staniouta
  - May 31 – June 2: 2013 European Championships in Vienna, Austria
    - Ball winner: (Russia) Yana Kudryavtseva
    - Clubs winner: (Russia) Yana Kudryavtseva
    - Hoop winner: (Russia) Daria Svatkovskaya
    - Ribbon winner: (Russia) Margarita Mamun
  - August 17 – 18 at St. Petersburg
    - All-around overall winner: (Russia) Margarita Mamun
    - Group all-around winner: Russia
    - Ball winner: (Russia) Yana Kudryavtseva
    - Clubs winner: (Russia) Margarita Mamun
    - Hoop winner: (Russia) Margarita Mamun
    - Ribbon winner: (Russia) Margarita Mamun
    - Ten Clubs winner: Russia
    - Two ribbons and three balls winner: Russia
- August 28 – September 1: 2013 World Rhythmic Gymnastics Championships in Kyiv, Ukraine
  - Russia wins both the gold and overall medal tallies.
    - All-around overall winner: (Russia) Yana Kudryavtseva
    - Group all-around winner: Belarus
    - Ball winner: (Russia) Margarita Mamun
    - Clubs winner: (Russia) Yana Kudryavtseva and Margarita Mamun in a tie
    - Hoop winner: (Ukraine) Ganna Rizatdinova
    - Ribbon winner: (Russia) Yana Kudryavtseva
    - Ten Clubs winner: Spain
    - Two ribbons and three balls winner: Russia

== Trampolining ==
- September 6 – October 5: FIG Trampolining World Cup
  - September 6 & 7 at (Portugal) Loulé
    - Men's individual trampoline: (Russia) Nikita Fedorenko
    - Women's individual trampoline: (Canada) Rosie MacLennan
    - Men's synchronized: (Russia) Sergei Azarian / Mikhail Melnik
    - Women's synchronized: (Canada) Rosie MacLennan / Samantha Sendel
    - Men's individual tumbling: (Russia) Alexander Bezyulev
    - Women's individual tumbling: (Russia) Anastasiia Isupova
  - September 13 & 14 at (Spain) Valladolid
    - Men's individual trampoline: (China) Gao Lei
    - Women's individual trampoline: (China) Zhong Xingping
    - Men's synchronized: (Russia) Nikita Fedorenko / Dmitry Ushakov
    - Women's synchronized: (Japan) Reina Satake / Chisato Doihata
  - October 4 & 5 at (Denmark) Odense
    - Men's individual trampoline: (China) Dong Dong
    - Women's individual trampoline: (United Kingdom) Bryony Page
    - Men's synchronized: (China) Xiao TU / Dong Dong
    - Women's synchronized: (Canada) Rosie MacLennan / Samantha Sendel
    - Men's individual tumbling: (Russia) Tagir Murtazaev
    - Women's individual tumbling: (China) JIA Fangfang
- November 7 – 10: 2013 Trampoline World Championships in (Bulgaria) Sofia
  - Men's individual trampoline: (China) Dong Dong
  - Women's individual trampoline: (Canada) Rosannagh MacLennan
  - Men's individual team trampoline: China
  - Women's individual team trampoline: Great Britain
  - Men's synchronized trampoline: Japan
  - Women's synchronized trampoline: Great Britain
  - Men's individual tumbling: (United Kingdom) Kristof Willerton
  - Women's individual tumbling: (China) JIA Fangfang
  - Men's individual team tumbling: Russia
  - Women's individual team tumbling: China
  - Men's individual double mini-trampoline: (Russia) Mikhail Zalomin
  - Women's individual double mini-trampoline: (United States) Kristle Lowell
  - Men's individual team double mini-trampoline: United States
  - Women's individual team double mini-trampoline: United States
