= Maria Titova =

Russian rhythmic gymnast

- Full name: Maria Pavlovna Titova
- Alternative names: Masha, Mashulya, Mashenka
- Nickname: The Swan
- Born: 19 August 1997 (age 29) Zarechny, Penza Oblast, Russia
- Height: 1.83 m (6 ft 0 in)

Gymnastics career
- Discipline: Rhythmic gymnastics
- Country represented: Russia
- Club: Gazprom
- Gym: Novogorsk
- Head coach: Irina Viner
- Former coaches: Daria Kondakova, Vera Shtelbaums, Marina Govorova, Dinara Gimatova, Alla Yanina, Maria Barkarova
- Choreographer: Tatiana Pomerantseva
- Retired: yes
- World ranking: 5 (2014 Season); 13 (2013 Season)
Medal record
Representing Russia
Rhythmic Gymnastics
Grand Prix Final
Silver medal – second place	2013 Berlin	All-around
Silver medal – second place	2013 Berlin	Hoop
Silver medal – second place	2013 Berlin	Ball
Summer Universiade
Silver medal – second place	2015 Gwangju	Hoop
Bronze medal – third place	2015 Gwangju	Ball

Maria Pavlovna Titova (Russian: Мария Павловна Титова; born 19 August 1997) is a Russian retired individual rhythmic gymnast. She is the 2013 Grand Prix Final all-around silver medalist

== Career ==
=== Junior ===
Titova began to do gymnastics at the age of five when she was noticed by one RG coach on the street and invited to the gym. Later on she was invited by Amina Zaripova to the Center of Olympics in Moscow and this year she began to train in Novogorsk. She won the gold medal in hoop at the 2011 Russian-Chinese Youth Games and placed fifth in all-around at the 2012 Russian Junior Championships in Kazan. Her international junior-level appearances included the 2012 Moscow Grand Prix and the 2012 Deriugina Cup in Kyiv, where she was a member of the gold medal-winning team.

=== Senior ===
In 2013, at the press conference of Grand Prix Moscow, Irina Viner mentioned that she took Titova to the ballet to watch Vrubel's The Swan Princess. Titova used Tchaikovsky's Swan Lake Pas de deux for her hoop routine. On February 9–11, Titova competed in her first senior nationals at the 2013 Russian Championships in Kazan where she finished 5th in all-around. She made her international senior debut at the 2013 Moscow Grand Prix.

Titova made her international breakthrough at the Holon Grand Prix, winning the gold in ribbon. Her first World Cup was the 2013 Irina Deleanu Cup. She finished fourth in all-around and took gold in hoop. Titova won the silver medal in all-around at the 2013 Pesaro World Cup, ahead of teammate Daria Svatkovskaya, and also won silver in the ball final. In September, Vera Shtelbaums became her new coach. Titova finished eighth in the all-around at the 2013 Grand Prix Brno. At the 2013 Grand Prix Final in Berlin. She won the all-around silver ahead of Bulgarian Sylvia Miteva and also took silver in the event finals for ball and hoop.

In 2014, Titova started her season competing at the 2014 Moscow Grand Prix and won silver in the all-around behind Margarita Mamun. In the event finals, she won gold in ribbon and silver in ball. She finished 4th in all-around at the 2014 Thiais Grand Prix and won bronze in ribbon. Titova was assigned to compete at the 2014 Stuttgart World Cup where she won the all-around bronze medal. Titova won another all-around bronze at the 2014 Holon Grand Prix, she qualified to 2 event finals and won bronze in clubs and finished 8th in hoop. Titova finished 6th in all-around at the 2014 Lisboa World Cup, she qualified to 2 event finals winning silver in hoop and finished 6th in ribbon. On April 23–27, Titova competed at the 2014 Russian Championships and finished 4th in all-around behind Aleksandra Soldatova. Her next event, Titova competed at the 2014 Desio Italia Cup with teammates Margarita Mamun and Yana Kudryavtseva where she won the all-around silver medal. On May 30 – June 1, Titova finished 4th in all-around at the 2014 Minsk World Cup, she qualified to 1 event final finishing 6th in hoop. On July 4–6, Titova competed at the Izmir Tournament Cup and won the all-around silver medal behind teammate Aleksandra Soldatova, In event finals, Titova won 2 gold (hoop, ball) and bronze in clubs. On August 8–10, Titova competed at the 2014 Sofia World Cup finishing 5th in all-around with a total of 69.300 points behind Melitina Staniouta, she qualified to 2 event finals taking bronze in ribbon and 6th in hoop. On September 5–7, at the 2014 World Cup Final in Kazan, Russia, Ttiova she finished 22nd in all-around after 2 drops from her hoop and clubs routine and mistakes in ribbon, thus because of her unstable results, Irina Viner decided to remove Titova from Russia's team to compete in the 2014 World Championships, On October 18–20, Titova returned to competition at the 2014 Grand Prix Berlin where she won the all-around gold, In event finals she won gold in hoop, ball and ribbon and finished 8th in clubs. She finished 4th in all-around at the 2014 Grand Prix Brno behind Victoria Veinberg Filanovsky. Titova suffered a minor leg injury and withdrew from the 2014 Grand Prix Final in Innsbruck.

At the beginning of 2015, Titova was assigned to her new coach Marina Govorova. Her first competition this year was the Moscow Championships. Her next event was the MTM International Tournament in Slovenia where she won the all-around gold, ahead of her teammate Yulia Sinitsina. In the event finals, she won gold in ball and silvers in hoop, clubs and ribbon. Her third competition this year was the Russian Championships in Penza where she ranked 8th in the all around. In the apparatus finals, she was 8th in ribbon. Her fourth competition this year was the International tournament in Holon. She won gold in ball. Her fifth competition this year was the 2015 Summer Universiade in Gwangju, Korea where Titova finished 4th in the all-around behind Melitina Staniouta of Belarus. She qualified to 3 apparatus finals taking silver in hoop, bronze in ball and finished 4th in ribbon. In August, Titova competed at the MTK Budapest Cup and won the all-around silver medal behind Dina Averina. In event finals, she won gold in ribbon and silver in clubs. At the International Tournament Sofia Cup 2015, Titova suffered another injury (knee) and withdrew from the competition after two routines. In November, she returned to competition at the Italian international friendly invitational club the Italia Serie A.

In 2016 Season, Titova was relegated to the Russian National reserve team, she switched coaching and began training under Daria Kondakova. She competed in an internal Russian event at the 2016 Yaroslavl Spring. Titova then competed at the 2016 Russian Championships finishing 13th in the all-around. She completed her career at the end of the season.

== Personal life ==
Titova is an only child. Her favorite gymnast is Irina Tchachina.

== Routine music information ==
Year	Apparatus	Music title
2016	Hoop	"Discombobulate" music from The Sherlock Holmes soundtrack by Hans Zimmer
2016	Ball	?
2016	Clubs	Yablochko (Russian Sailor Dance) from The Red Poppy by Eugene Ormandy & The Philadelphia Orchestra
2016	Ribbon	María de Buenos Aires (Yo soy Maria) music from Ástor Piazzolla and libretto Horacio Ferrer by Sandra Rumolino
2015	Hoop	"End Credits” by Bruno Coulais, The Children's Choir Of Nice
2015	Ball	"White Acacia" (folk song, composer unknown)
2015	Clubs	Malagueña by Ernesto Lecuona
2015	Ribbon	'A Time For Us' Instrumental Version by David Davidson, Composed by Nino Rota (from "Romeo and Juliet (1968 film)" OST)
2014	Hoop (2nd)	"Guerrileros”, “Ange et Demon" by Maxime Rodriguez
2014	Hoop (1st)	The Invitation To The Jellicle Ball; The Jellicle Ball; The Gumbie Cat from Cats by Andrew Lloyd Webber
2014	Ball	"Adieu", by Giovanni Marradi
2014	Clubs	“Baila Maria” by Alabina, Ishtar Los Niños de Sara
2014	Ribbon	"Swan Lake, Op.20: No.21. Danse Russe: Cadenza-Andante" by Vladimir Fedoseyev
2014	Gala	“Étude in D-sharp minor, Op. 8, No. 12“ by Alexander Scriabin
2013	Hoop	"Swan Lake, Op.20 / Act 1–12, NO.5-Pas de Deux" by Pyotr Tchaikovsky
2013	Ball (2nd)	"Adieu", by Giovanni Marradi
2013	Ball (1st)	"Vdol po ulitse metelitsa metyot" ( Russian folk song)
2013	Clubs (2nd)	“Baila Maria” by Alabina, Ishtar Los Niños de Sara
2013	Clubs	“Quiero Saber” and “Vamos a bailar” by Gipsy Kings
2013	Ribbon	“My Fair Lady” by Frederick Loewe
2012	Hoop	OST "Theme from The Apartment"- by Ferrante & Teicher
2012	Ball	"No tengo Tango" by Mr. Tea
2012	Ball (2nd)	“Memory” from musical "Cats" by Andrew Lioyd Webber
2012	Clubs	"Рио Рита (Rio Rita)" from TV series Место встречи изменить
2012	Ribbon	Romeo and Juliet by Pyotr Tchaikovsky
2011	Hoop	OST "Theme from The Apartment"- by Ferrante & Teicher
2011	Ball	"No tengo Tango" by Mr. Tea
2011	Clubs	Baya Baya by Safr Duo
2011	Clubs (2nd)	“Rito Ria” from TV series "Место встречи изменить нельзя"
2011	Ribbon	Ballet "Giselle" by Adolphe Adam
2011	Ribbon (2nd)	Romeo and Juliet by Pyotr Tchaikovsky
