= 2013 FIG Rhythmic Gymnastics World Cup series =

International rhythm gymnastics competition

The 2013 FIG World Cup circuit in Rhythmic Gymnastics includes one category A event (Sofia) and seven category B events. Apart from Tartu, Bucharest and Corbeil-Essonnes (individuals only), all events include both individual and group competitions, with all-around competitions serving as qualifications for the finals by apparatus. With stopovers in Europe only, the competitions took place on 8 – 10 February in Tartu (EST), 3 – 6 April in Lisbon (POR), 19 – 21 April April in Bucharest (ROU), 26 – 28 April in Pesaro (ITA), 4 – 5 May in Sofia (BUL), 10 – 12 May in Corbeil-Essonnes (FRA), 17 – 19 May in Minsk (BLR) and 17 – 18 August in St Petersburg (RUS). The world ranking points collected by the competitors at their best four World Cup events added up to a total, and the top scorers in each event were crowned winners of the overall series at the final event in Saint Petersburg, Russia.

== Formats ==
Date	Levels	Location	Type	Ref.
8–10 February 2013	Cat. B	(Estonia) Tartu	Individuals	
3–7 April 2013	Cat. B	(Portugal) Lisbon	Individuals and groups	
19–21 April 2013	Cat. B	(Romania) Bucharest	Individuals	
26–28 April 2013	Cat. B	(Italy) Pesaro	Individuals and groups	
4–5 May 2013	Cat. A	(Bulgaria) Sofia	Individuals and groups	
10–12 May 2013	Cat. B	(France) Corbeil-Essonnes	Individuals	
17–19 May 2013	Cat. B	(Belarus) Minsk	Individuals and groups	
17–18 August 2013	Cat. B	(Russia) St. Petersburg	Individuals and groups	

== Medal winners ==
=== All-around ===
==== Individual ====
Competitions	Gold	Silver	Bronze
Category A
Sofia	(Russia) Yana Kudryavtseva	(Bulgaria) Sylvia Miteva	(Russia) Margarita Mamun
Category B
Tartu	(Ukraine) Ganna Rizatdinova	(Belarus) Melitina Staniouta	(Azerbaijan) Marina Durunda
Lisbon	(Russia) Margarita Mamun	(Russia) Alexandra Merkulova	(Ukraine) Ganna Rizatdinova
Bucharest	(Belarus) Melitina Staniouta	(Ukraine) Alina Maksymenko	(Russia) Daria Svatkovskaya
Pesaro	(Belarus) Melitina Staniouta	(Russia) Maria Titova	(Russia) Daria Svatkovskaya
Corbeil-Essonnes	(Ukraine) Ganna Rizatdinova	(Belarus) Melitina Staniouta	(Russia) Margarita Mamun
Minsk	(Russia) Yana Kudryavtseva	(Russia) Daria Svatkovskaya	(Belarus) Melitina Staniouta
Saint Petersburg	(Russia) Margarita Mamun	(Belarus) Melitina Staniouta	(Russia) Yana Kudryavtseva

==== Group all-around ====
Competitions	Gold	Silver	Bronze
Category A
Sofia	Bulgaria	Russia	Belarus
Category B
Lisbon	Spain	Bulgaria	Russia
Pesaro	Italy	Bulgaria	Ukraine
Minsk	Russia	Belarus	Italy
Saint Petersburg	Russia	Belarus	Spain

=== Apparatus ===
==== Hoop ====
Competitions	Gold	Silver	Bronze
Tartu	(Ukraine) Ganna Rizatdinova	(Belarus) Melitina Staniouta	(Azerbaijan) Lala Yusifova
Lisbon	(Russia) Margarita Mamun	(Russia) Alexandra Merkulova	(Ukraine) Ganna Rizatdinova
Bucharest	(Russia) Maria Titova	(Romania) Alexandra Piscupescu	(Azerbaijan) Lala Yusifova
Pesaro	(Russia) Daria Svatkovskaya	(Belarus) Melitina Staniouta	(Ukraine) Alina Maksymenko
Sofia	(Russia) Yana Kudryavtseva	(Bulgaria) Sylvia Miteva	(Ukraine) Ganna Rizatdinova
Sofia	(Russia) Yana Kudryavtseva	(Bulgaria) Sylvia Miteva	(South Korea) Son Yeon-Jae
Corbeil-Essonnes	(Russia) Margarita Mamun	(Ukraine) Ganna Rizatdinova	(Russia) Alexandra Merkulova
Minsk	(Russia) Daria Svatkovskaya	(South Korea) Son Yeon-Jae	(Israel) Neta Rivkin
Saint Petersburg	(Russia) Margarita Mamun	(South Korea) Son Yeon-Jae	(Belarus) Melitina Staniouta

==== Ball ====
Competitions	Gold	Silver	Bronze
Tartu	(Belarus) Melitina Staniouta	(Ukraine) Ganna Rizatdinova	(Azerbaijan) Marina Durunda
Lisbon	(Russia) Margarita Mamun	(Ukraine) Ganna Rizatdinova	(South Korea) Son Yeon-Jae
Bucharest	(Belarus) Melitina Staniouta	(Romania) Alexandra Piscupescu	(Russia) Daria Svatkovskaya
Pesaro	(Belarus) Melitina Staniouta	(Russia) Maria Titova	(Israel) Neta Rivkin
Sofia	(Russia) Margarita Mamun	(Bulgaria) Sylvia Miteva	Not awarded
Sofia	(Russia) Margarita Mamun	(Israel) Neta Rivkin	Not awarded
Corbeil-Essonnes	(Russia) Margarita Mamun	(Belarus) Melitina Staniouta	(Ukraine) Ganna Rizatdinova
Minsk	(Russia) Yana Kudryavtseva	(Russia) Daria Svatkovskaya	(Bulgaria) Sylvia Miteva
Saint Petersburg	(Russia) Yana Kudryavtseva	(Russia) Margarita Mamun	(Bulgaria) Sylvia Miteva

==== Clubs ====
Competitions	Gold	Silver	Bronze
Tartu	(Belarus) Melitina Staniouta	(Ukraine) Ganna Rizatdinova	(Azerbaijan) Marina Durunda
Lisbon	(Russia) Margarita Mamun	(Ukraine) Ganna Rizatdinova	(Belarus) Melitina Staniouta
Bucharest	(Belarus) Melitina Staniouta	Not awarded	(Ukraine) Alina Maksymenko
Bucharest	(Russia) Daria Svatkovskaya	Not awarded	(Ukraine) Alina Maksymenko
Pesaro	(Belarus) Melitina Staniouta	(Russia) Daria Svatkovskaya	(Ukraine) Ganna Rizatdinova
Sofia	(Russia) Yana Kudryavtseva	(Ukraine) Ganna Rizatdinova	(Bulgaria) Sylvia Miteva
Corbeil-Essonnes	(Ukraine) Ganna Rizatdinova	(Russia) Margarita Mamun	(Belarus) Melitina Staniouta
Minsk	(Belarus) Melitina Staniouta	(Russia) Yana Kudryavtseva	Not awarded
Minsk	(Belarus) Melitina Staniouta	(South Korea) Son Yeon-Jae	Not awarded
Saint Petersburg	(Russia) Margarita Mamun	(Russia) Yana Kudryavtseva	(Belarus) Melitina Staniouta

==== Ribbon ====
Competitions	Gold	Silver	Bronze
Tartu	(Belarus) Melitina Staniouta	(Ukraine) Ganna Rizatdinova	(Azerbaijan) Marina Durunda
Lisbon	(Russia) Margarita Mamun	(Belarus) Melitina Staniouta	(China) Deng Senyue
Bucharest	(Belarus) Melitina Staniouta	Not awarded	(Romania) Alexandra Piscupescu
Bucharest	(Russia) Daria Svatkovskaya	Not awarded	(Romania) Alexandra Piscupescu
Pesaro	(Belarus) Melitina Staniouta	(South Korea) Son Yeon-Jae	(Ukraine) Ganna Rizatdinova
Sofia	(Bulgaria) Sylvia Miteva	(Russia) Margarita Mamun	Not awarded
Sofia	(Bulgaria) Sylvia Miteva	(Ukraine) Ganna Rizatdinova	Not awarded
Corbeil-Essonnes	(Russia) Margarita Mamun	(Ukraine) Ganna Rizatdinova	(Russia) Alexandra Merkulova
Minsk	(Belarus) Melitina Staniouta	(Russia) Yana Kudryavtseva	(Russia) Daria Svatkovskaya
Saint Petersburg	(Russia) Margarita Mamun	(Russia) Yana Kudryavtseva	(South Korea) Son Yeon-Jae

==== 10 clubs ====
Competitions	Gold	Silver	Bronze
Lisbon	Russia	China	Switzerland
Lisbon	Russia	China	Ukraine
Pesaro	Italy	Ukraine	Bulgaria
Sofia	Bulgaria	Spain	Belarus
Minsk	Italy	Azerbaijan	Russia
Saint Petersburg	Russia	Belarus	Italy

==== 2 ribbons and 3 balls ====
Competitions	Gold	Silver	Bronze
Lisbon	Russia	China	Spain
Pesaro	Italy	Bulgaria	Belarus
Sofia	Russia	Bulgaria	Belarus
Minsk	Belarus	Russia	Brazil
Saint Petersburg	Russia	Belarus	France

== Overall medal table ==
Rank	Nation	Gold	Silver	Bronze	Total
1	Russia (RUS)	31	16	11	58
2	Belarus (BLR)	14	11	9	34
3	Ukraine (UKR)	4	11	10	25
4	Italy (ITA)	4	0	2	6
5	Bulgaria (BUL)	3	7	4	14
6	Spain (ESP)	1	1	2	4
7	South Korea (KOR)	0	4	3	7
8	China (CHN)	0	2	1	3
8	Romania (ROU)	0	2	1	3
10	Azerbaijan (AZE)	0	1	6	7
11	Israel (ISR)	0	1	2	3
12	Brazil (BRA)	0	0	1	1
12	France (FRA)	0	0	1	1
12	Switzerland (SUI)	0	0	1	1
Totals (14 entries)		57	56	54	167

== See also ==
- 2013 FIG Artistic Gymnastics World Cup series
- 2013 Rhythmic Gymnastics Grand Prix circuit
