= Melitina Staniouta =

Belarusian rhythmic gymnast (born 1993)

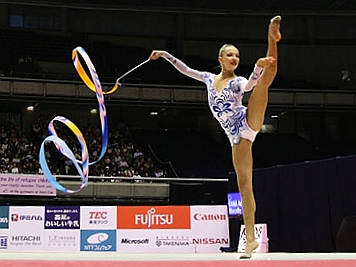

Personal information
- Full name: Melitina Dzmitryeuna Staniouta
- Alternative name: Melitina Stanyuta
- Nickname: Meli/Mellita
- Born: 15 November 1993 (age 32) Minsk, Belarus
- Height: 173 cm (5 ft 8 in)

Gymnastics career
- Discipline: Rhythmic gymnastics
- Country represented: Belarus
- Club: Dinamo
- Head coach: Irina Leparskaya
- Choreographer: Galina Ryzhankova
- Eponymous skills: cossack turn starting on floor + connecting penchee turn
- Retired: December 23rd 2016
- World ranking: 6 (2016 Season); 4 (2015 Season); 3 (2014 Season); 2 (2013 Season); 14 (2012 Season); 6 (2011 Season)
Medal record
International gymnastics competitions
Event	1st	2nd	3rd
World Championships	0	5	9
European Games	0	1	3
European Championships	0	5	5
Grand Prix Final	0	1	2
World Games	2	1	1
Summer Universiade	1	2	2
Total	3	15	22
Rhythmic gymnastics
Representing Belarus
World Championships
Silver medal – second place	2009 Mie	Team
Silver medal – second place	2010 Moscow	Team
Silver medal – second place	2011 Montpellier	Team
Silver medal – second place	2014 Izmir	Team
Silver medal – second place	2015 Stuttgart	Team
Bronze medal – third place	2009 Mie	Hoop
Bronze medal – third place	2010 Moscow	All-around
Bronze medal – third place	2010 Moscow	Rope
Bronze medal – third place	2013 Kyiv	All-around
Bronze medal – third place	2013 Kyiv	Ball
Bronze medal – third place	2013 Kyiv	Ribbon
Bronze medal – third place	2014 Izmir	Ball
Bronze medal – third place	2015 Stuttgart	All-around
Bronze medal – third place	2015 Stuttgart	Ball
European Games
Silver medal – second place	2015 Baku	Hoop
Bronze medal – third place	2015 Baku	All-around
Bronze medal – third place	2015 Baku	Ball
Bronze medal – third place	2015 Baku	Clubs
European Championships
Silver medal – second place	2011 Minsk	Team
Silver medal – second place	2014 Baku	All-around
Silver medal – second place	2015 Minsk	Team
Silver medal – second place	2015 Minsk	Hoop
Silver medal – second place	2015 Minsk	Ribbon
Bronze medal – third place	2013 Vienna	Team
Bronze medal – third place	2013 Vienna	Hoop
Bronze medal – third place	2013 Vienna	Clubs
Bronze medal – third place	2015 Minsk	Ball
Bronze medal – third place	2015 Minsk	Clubs
Junior European Championships
Silver medal – second place	2008 Torino	Team
Silver medal – second place	2008 Torino	Rope
Silver medal – second place	2008 Torino	Ribbon
Bronze medal – third place	2007 Baku	10 Clubs
Grand Prix Final
Silver medal – second place	2009 Berlin	Ribbon
Bronze medal – third place	2009 Berlin	All-around
Bronze medal – third place	2009 Berlin	Rope
World Games
Gold medal – first place	2013 Cali	Ball
Gold medal – first place	2013 Cali	Clubs
Silver medal – second place	2013 Cali	Hoop
Bronze medal – third place	2009 Kaohsiung	Ball
Summer Universiade
Gold medal – first place	2015 Gwangju	Ribbon
Silver medal – second place	2013 Kazan	Hoop
Silver medal – second place	2015 Gwangju	Clubs
Bronze medal – third place	2015 Gwangju	All-around
Bronze medal – third place	2015 Gwangju	Hoop

Melitina Dmitryevna Staniouta (Belarusian: Меліціна Дзмітрыеўна Станюта, Russian: Мелитина Дмитриевна Станюта; born 15 November 1993) is a Belarusian retired individual rhythmic gymnast. She is a three-time (2015, 2013, 2010) World all-around bronze medalist, the 2015 European Games all-around bronze medalist, the 2014 European Championships all-around silver medalist, and 2009 Grand Prix Final all-around bronze medalist.

== Personal life ==
Staniouta is the great-granddaughter of Belarusian actress Stefaniya Staniouta. Staniouta speaks Belarusian, Russian, English and French.

In 2020 she expressed criticism of the re-election of President Alexander Lukashenko and documented police brutality against Belarusian citizens during peaceful anti-government protests via her Instagram account. She was one of 400 Belarusian athletes to publicly criticize the election results of the 2020 presidential election in Belarus. Due to her political activism, she and her parents lost their jobs and she fled her home in Minsk. In early 2022, she went to Kyiv, where she lived in exile before the Russian invasion of Ukraine. She has criticized the invasion on social media. Since 2022, she resides in Rueil-Malmaison, a suburb of Paris, where she coaches rhythmic gymnastics.

== Junior career ==
Staniouta first took up the sport of rhythmic gymnastics in 1998. In 2005, she started to train with former Belarusian rhythmic gymnast Larissa Loukianenko, and she was included in the national team.

Staniouta won a number of junior medals, including at the 2008 European Junior Championships, where she won the silver medal in ribbon and rope.

== Senior career ==
2009-2012

In 2009, Staniouta debuted as a senior and won two medals at the 2009 World Championships in Mie. She won bronze in the rope event at the Rhythmic Gymnastics FIG World Cup Series in Pesaro 2009 and All-around at the 2009 Grand Prix Final in Berlin. At the 2009 World Cup Series' last stage, she won the bronze medal in All-around, a silver medal for rope, and bronze medals for hoop, ball and ribbon in the finals.

Staniouta repeated her success in 2010 and won the bronze medal in the All-around at the World Cup Series' last stage. She was also the all around bronze medalist and won a bronze in rope finals at the 2010 World Championships, she broke her foot during competition but continued to compete. Following the event she had an iron pin put into her foot and missed several months of competition. She also suffered a broken finger, leg and collarbone in 2010. In 2011, Staniouta continued to struggled with injuries throughout the World Cup and Grand Prix season.

In 2012, Staniouta competed at the 2012 European Championships and finished 6th in All-around. At the World Cup series in Minsk, she won bronze medals in hoop, clubs and ribbon final ahead of fellow Belarusian Liubov Charkashyna. She competed in her first Olympics in 2012 London and finished 12th at the qualifications but did not advance to the Top 10 finals.

2013

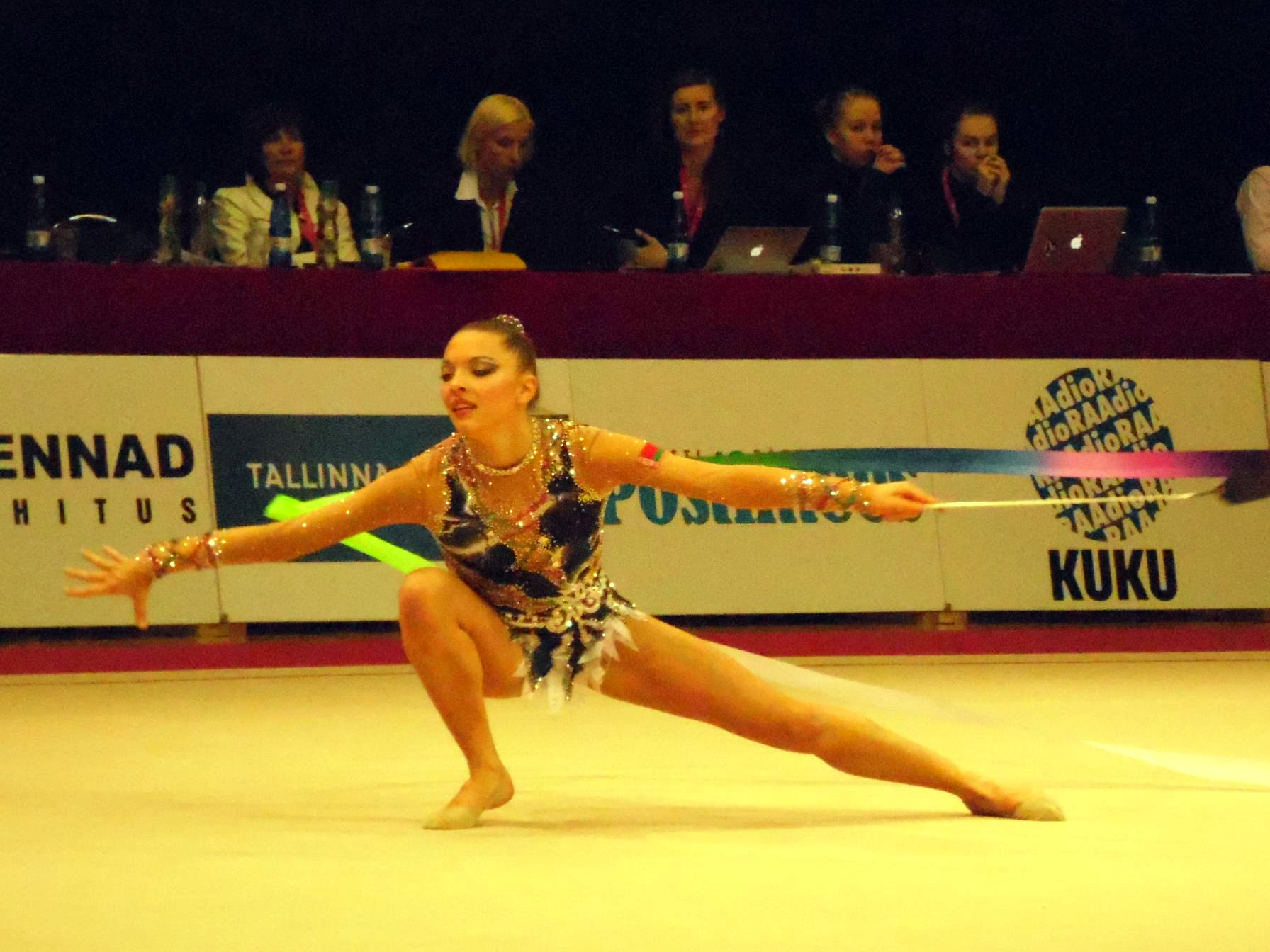
Staniouta at the 2013 Valentine World Cup with her signature skill: cossack turn starting on floor connecting to a penchee turn

Staniouta returned to competition in the 2013 season under the new Code of Points system in rhythmic gymnastics. She won the silver medal in all-around at the first World Cup series held in Tartu, Estonia. At the Thiais Grand Prix, Staniouta won bronze medal in clubs, hoop and ribbon finals.

At the second World Cup series of the season held in Lisbon, Portugal, Staniouta won the silver medal in ribbon and bronze in clubs final. She won her first World Cup all-around gold medal at the 2013 Irina Deleanu Cup, edging out Ukrainian Alina Maksymenko (silver) and Russian Daria Svatkovskaya (bronze). Staniouta won the 2013 World Cup Pesaro in the all-around, beating Russians Maria Titova and Daria Svatkovskaya for the gold. She also won three gold medals at the event finals in ball, clubs and ribbon. At the 2013 Corbeil-Essonnes World Cup, Staniouta won the silver in the all-around. In the event finals, she won another silver medal in ball and a bronze in the clubs final. At the 2013 Minsk World Cup, she won the all-around bronze in front of a home crowd. Additionally, she won two gold medals in the event finals in clubs and ribbon.

Staniouta then competed at the 2013 European Championships in Vienna, Austria and together with her teammates ( Katsiaryna Halkina and Arina Charopa) won the Team bronze medal. She won bronze in the hoop and clubs finals. In July, she performed at the 2013 Summer Universiade in Kazan, where she won silver in hoop behind Margarita Mamun. At the 2013 World Games in Cali, she won two gold medals (clubs and ball), beating Ukrainians Rizatdinova and Maksymenko. In August, at the 2013 World Cup series in St.Petersburg, Russia, Staniouta won the silver in the all-around ahead of Russian Yana Kudryavtseva and won bronze medals in the hoop and clubs finals.

At the 2013 World Championships in Kyiv, Ukraine, Staniouta qualified to all four event finals where she won bronze medals in ribbon and ball, placed fifth in hoop and seventh in clubs. She won the all-around bronze medal at the 2013 World Championships with an overall score of 72.166 points. In October, she competed at the 2013 Grand Prix Brno and won bronze in the all-around, hoop, ball, ribbon in addition to silver in clubs. On October 25–27, Staniouta competed at the World Club Championship, the 2013 Aeon Cup in Tokyo, Japan. Representing team Dinamo together with teammate Katsiaryna Halkina, she won the team silver. She also won the silver medal in the all-around finals ahead of Mamun.

2014

Staniouta began the 2014 season by competing at LA Lights and won the all-around gold medal ahead of Rizatdinova. She finished seventh in all-around at the 2014 Moscow Grand Prix and won a bronze medal in ball. In her next event, Staniouta finished sixth in the all-around at the 2014 Thiais Grand Prix and a won gold medal in ribbon, where she tied with Ganna Rizatdinova. She competed at the 2014 Stuttgart World Cup where she finished fourth in all-around. In event finals: she won silver in ball and three bronze medals (in hoop, clubs and ribbon).

Staniouta then won silver in all-around at the 2014 Lisboa World Cup. She qualified to three event finals, where she won gold in hoop and silver in ball. Her next event was the 2014 Pesaro World Cup. She finished eighth in the all-around and won the bronze medal in the clubs final. In May, she competed at the 2014 Kalamata Cup, where she won the all-around gold medal, and the 2014 Tashkent World Cup, where she finished fifth in the all-around behind Neta Rivkin. She also qualified to all four event finals and won three silver medals (hoop, clubs, ribbon) and a bronze in ball. In her next event, Staniouta won the all-around silver medal at the 2014 Minsk World Cup ahead of Margarita Mamun. In the event finals, she won a gold in ribbon and two bronzes with clubs and ball.

On June 10–15, Staniouta was selected to compete at the 2014 European Championships in Baku, Azerbaijan. She won silver in the individual all-around competition, which was the first all-around medal for a Belarusian gymnast since 14 years prior when Yulia Raskina also won silver at the 2000 European Championships in Zaragoza. On August 8–10, Staniouta then competed at the 2014 Sofia World Cup and finished fourth in the all-around after a drop in her clubs and her ball rolling off the mat at the end of her exercise. She qualified to two event finals and won silver in hoop and ribbon.

On September 5–7, competing at the 2014 World Cup series in Kazan, Staniouta took the all-around bronze medal with a total of 72.350 points. She qualified to all four event finals and won two silver (in clubs, ribbon), a bronze in ball and fifth in hoop. On September 22–28, Staniouta (along with teammates Katsiaryna Halkina and Arina Charopa) represented Belarus at the 2014 World Championships, where they took the team silver with a total of 136.073 points. She qualified to three event finals and took bronze in ball. She also placed fourth in ribbon and seventh in clubs. In the all-around, Staniouta ended up finishing seventh overall after making mistakes, including a drop in her clubs and ball routines.

On October 17–19, Staniouta traveled to Tokyo for the 2014 Aeon Cup. She represented the Team Dinamo club together with senior teammate Katsiaryna Halkina and junior Mariya Trubach. They won the team silver. She won the all-around bronze medal in the finals ahead of Ganna Rizatdinova.

2015

In the 2015 season, Staniouta's first competition was at the 2015 L.A. Lights, where she won the all-around silver medal behind Ukraine's Ganna Rizatdinova. At the 2015 Moscow Grand Prix, she won the all-around bronze medal. In event finals, she won gold in clubs and silver in hoop and ball, and she was fourth in ribbon. She then competed at the 2015 Baltic Hoop and won the all-around gold ahead of senior debutant Irina Annenkova. In the event finals, Staniouta took gold in hoop, silver in clubs and bronze in ribbon.

On April 3–5, Staniouta competed at the 2015 Bucharest World Cup and finished bronze in the all-around. In the apparatus finals, she won bronze in hoop, ball, and ribbon and placed sixth in clubs. On April 10–12, Staniouta placed fifth in the all-around at the 2015 Pesaro World Cup behind Ukraine's Ganna Rizatdinova. She qualified to all the apparatus finals and took silver in ball and bronze in hoop and ribbon; with clubs, she placed eighth.

At the 2015 European Championships in Minsk, Staniouta won a total of five medals: silver in the team event and the hoop and ribbon finals and bronze with clubs and ball. At the 2015 Grand Prix Berlin, Staniouta won the all-around silver behind Margarita Mamun. She qualified to all four event finals and won gold in ribbon and bronze in hoop, ball and clubs.

On June 15–21, Staniouta competed at the inaugural 2015 European Games and won the all-around bronze with a total of 73.100 points, which was a personal best. She qualified to all the apparatus finals and took silver in hoop and bronze in ball and clubs, and she placed fourth in ribbon. Her next competition was at the 2015 Summer Universiade in Gwangju, Korea, where Staniouta won the all-around bronze behind Ganna Rizatdinova. She qualified to all apparatus finals and won three more medals: gold in ribbon, silver in clubs, bronze in hoop. With ball, she was fourth.

In August, Staniouta competed at the 2015 Budapest World Cup. She won bronze in the all-around final. In the apparatus finals, she won bronze in hoop, ball, and clubs and finished sixth in ribbon. In her next competition at the 2015 Sofia World Cup, Staniouta finished 4th in the all-around behind Ganna Rizatdinova. She qualified to all the apparatus finals and won silver in ball and bronze in hoop; she also placed fourth in clubs and 5th in ribbon. At the 2015 World Cup series in Kazan, Staniouta finished 4th in the all-around behind Aleksandra Soldatova. In the apparatus finals, she took bronze in ball and ribbon and finished 5th in hoop and eighth in clubs.

On September 9–13, Staniouta (together with teammates Katsiaryna Halkina, Hanna Bazhko and Arina Charopa) competed at the 2015 World Championships in Stuttgart. Team Belarus won the silver medal in the teams competition. Staniouta also qualified to all apparatus finals. She won bronze in ball and placed fourth in the other apparatus finals. In the all-around finals, Staniouta finished third, edging out Salome Pazhava of Georgia for the bronze medal. On October 2–4, Staniouta, together with teammates Arina Charopa and junior Yulia Isachanka, represented Team Dinamo Minsk at the 2015 Aeon Cup in Tokyo Japan, where Staniouta finished fourth in the individual all-around finals. Team Belarus finished third in the overall standings.

2016

In 2016, Staniouta began her season by competing at the 2016 Grand Prix Moscow, finishing 5th in the all-around. She also took a bronze in the clubs final. On February 26–28, Staniouta competed in the first World Cup of the season at the 2016 Espoo World Cup, where she was 4th in the all-around behind Korean Son Yeon-Jae. She also won bronze in clubs and ribbon.

On March 12–13, Staniouta competed at the MTM Tournament in Ljubljana, Slovenia and won the all-around silver with a total of 73.350 points behind Russian Margarita Mamun. In the apparatus finals, she won gold in ball and silver in hoop, clubs, and ribbon. At the 30th Thiais Grand Prix event in Paris, Staniouta won the all-around bronze ahead of Ganna Rizatdinova. She further won a silver in the ribbon final and three more bronze medals in hoop, ball and clubs. On April 1–3, Staniouta competed at the 2016 Pesaro World Cup and finished sixth in the all-around. She qualified for three event finals, where she took bronze in ball and was fourth in hoop and fifth in ribbon.

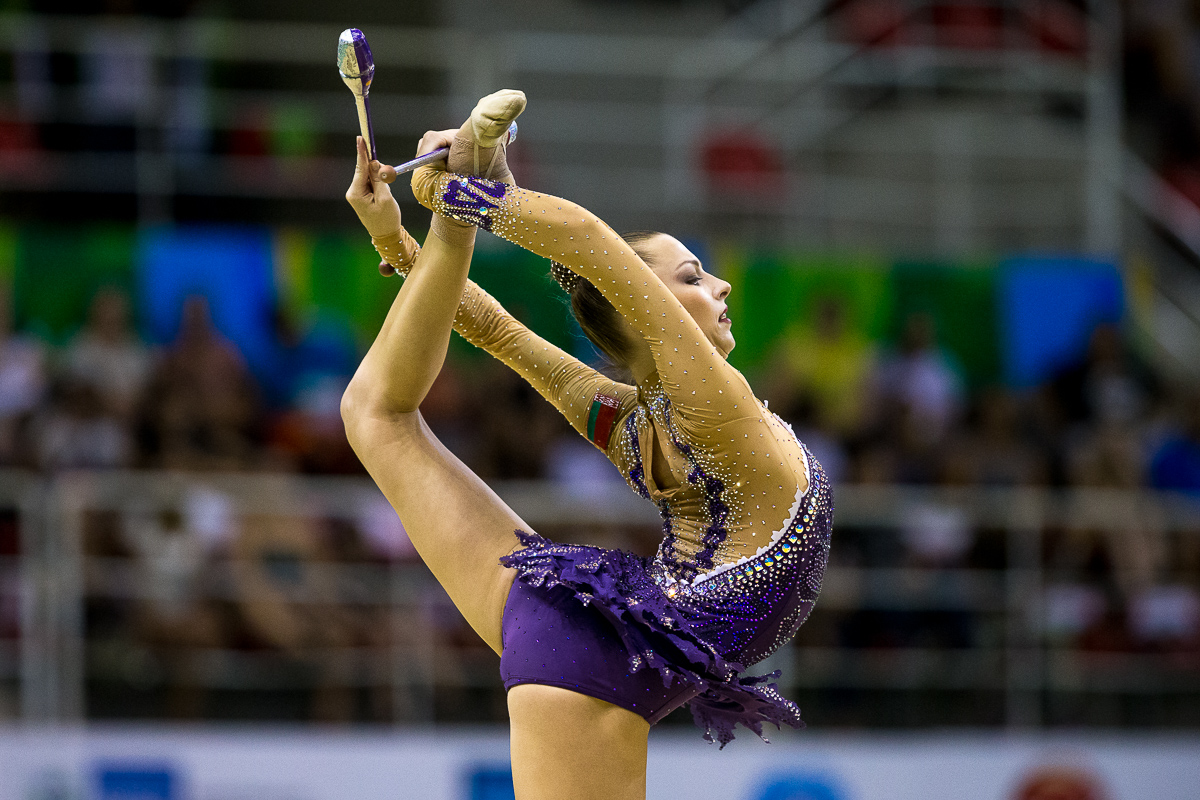
Staniouta competing at the 2016 Olympic Test Event

On May 6–8, Staniouta competed at the Brno Grand Prix, taking silver in the all-around with a total of 74.600 points; she qualified to all four apparatus finals and won silver in ball and clubs and bronze in hoop. She was fourth in ribbon. On May 13–15, Staniouta won the all-around gold at the Bucharest Grand Prix with a total of 74.150 points, ahead of Arina Averina and Dina Averina. She qualified to all apparatus finals, where she took gold in hoop, ball, and ribbon and placed fourth in clubs.

She won bronze in the all-around at the 2016 Minsk World Cup with a total of 73.950 points. In the event finals, she won a silver in hoop and two bronze medals in ball and clubs, and she placed 5th in ribbon. On June 3–5, Staniouta finished 5th in the all-around behind Son Yeon-Jae at the 2016 Guadalajara World Cup. She won silver in ribbon final and placed 5th in the other three apparatus finals.

On June 17–19, Staniouta competed at the 2016 European Championships and finished in 4th place with a total of 73.715 points. Two weeks later, she performed at the 2016 Berlin World Cup and won the all-around silver with a total of 73.900 points behind Russia's Dina Averina. Staniouta qualified to all apparatus finals and won gold in hoop, tied with Ganna Rizatdinova, silver in ball and clubs, and bronze in ribbon, tied with Salome Pazhava. On July 8–10, Staniouta then finished 5th in the all-around at the 2016 Kazan World Cup with a total of 74.150 points behind Korea's Son Yeon-Jae. She won silver in the ribbon final and bronze with ball and clubs.

On August 19–20, Staniouta competed at the 2016 Summer Olympics held in Rio de Janeiro, Brazil. She qualified to the rhythmic gymnastics individual all-around final, where she finished 5th overall after a drop in her clubs routine.

Staniouta originally said that she intended to keep competing. However, on December 23, she announced her retirement.

== Endorsements ==
Staniouta has appeared in a commercial ad for Bon Aqua. She is also one of Belarus' United Nations High Commissioner for Refugees Celebrity representatives.

== Routine music information ==
Year	Apparatus	Music title
2016	Hoop	Agnus Dei by Noella
2016	Ball	Fantasy For Violin And Orchestra from Ladies in Lavender by Joshua Bell
2016	Clubs (2nd)	Appassionata by Valentina Lisitsa
2016	Clubs (1st)	"Jota Aragonesa" by Mikhail Glinka
2016	Ribbon	Gipsy Romance by Folk Music Orchestra
2015	Hoop	Trędowata – Walc by Wojciech Killar
2015	Ball	Romance for Veronika by Vladimir Trofimov
2015	Clubs	Ramkoph's Dance by Roman Surzha
2015	Ribbon	Debo Hacerlo by Ana Gabriel
2015	Gala	Vai Vedrai by Cirque du Soleil
2015	Gala 2	The Colour Of The Night by Stepan Mezentsev
2014	Hoop	Thunderstruck by David Garrett
2014	Ball	Obsession (On Theme K. Orff. Carmina Burana) by Palladium Electric Band
2014	Clubs (2nd)	Codigo De Barra by Bajofondo
2014	Clubs	Star Scat by Caravan Palace
2014	Ribbon	Diva Mea by Alessandro Safina
2014	Gala	Vai Vedrai by Cirque du Soleil
2013	Hoop	La Leyenda Del Beso by Raul Di Blasio
2013	Ball	?
2013	Clubs	Astor Piazzolla: Contrastes by Ensemble Contraste
2013	Ribbon	Khachaturian: Masquerade: I Waltz by Alexander Lazarev & Bolshoi Symphony Orchestra
2013	Gala	Après Moi by Regina Spektor
2012	Hoop	The Puss Suite music from Puss in Boots OST by Henry Jackman
2012	Ball	Я тебя никогда не забуду (I will never forget you) by Aleksandr Marshal & Ariana
2012	Clubs	Wals music from The Master and Margarita OST by Igor Kornelyuk
2012	Ribbon	María by Felix Gray from the play "Don Juan" (2004)
2011	Hoop	Pa' Bailar music from Mar Dulce by Bajofondo
2011	Clubs	?
2011	Ball	?
2011	Ribbon	María by Felix Gray from the play "Don Juan" (2004)
2011	Gala	La valse d'Amélie & J'y suis jamais allé (remix version) from Amélie OST by Yann Tiersen
2010	Hoop	Domingo by Gotan Project
2010	Rope	Ja Vstretil Vas I've Met You / Mama Lakatos – Live From Budapest" by Roby Lakatos
2010	Ball	Django music from Fire Danceby Roby Lakatos
2010	Ribbon	Rock Prelude by David Garrett
2010	Gala	Music of Cataclysm – The Shattering
2009	Hoop	Letka-Enka by Hor Tureckogo
2009	Rope	Ja Vstretil Vas I've Met You / Mama Lakatos – Live From Budapest" by Roby Lakatos
2009	Ball	Django music from Fire Danceby Roby Lakatos
2009	Ribbon	?
