= Yana Kudryavtseva =

Russian rhythmic gymnast, World Champion, Olympic silver medalist

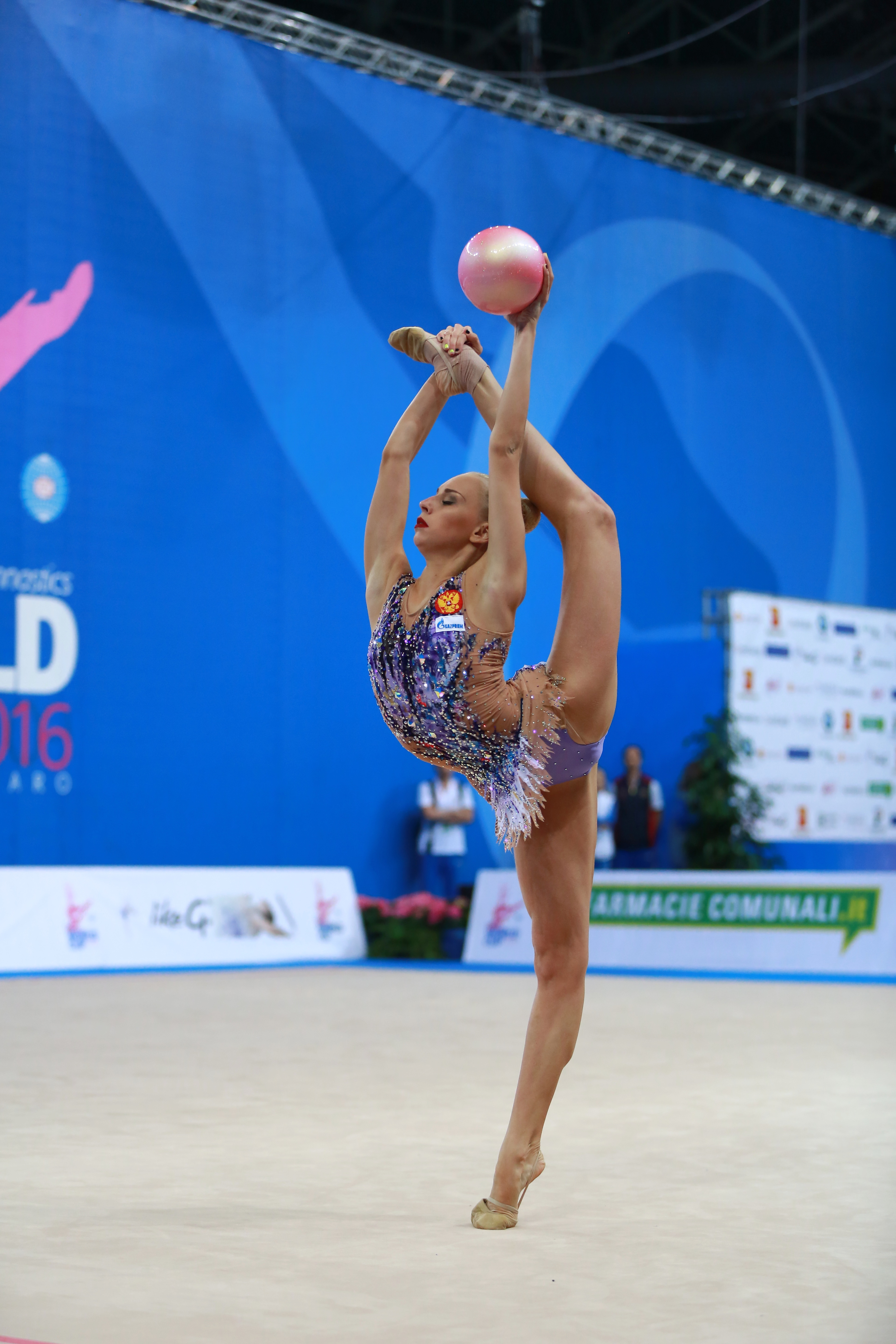
- Kudryavtseva at the 2016 World Cup performing her ball routine in Pesaro, Italy. Resulting in an individual apparatus score with ball of 19.200, succeeding with qualifying for finals.

Personal information
- Full name: Yana Alexeyevna Kudryavtseva
- Nicknames: Angel with iron wings, Crystal Statuette, Ice Queen, Kudry, Yanochka, The Princess of Rhythmic Gymnastics
- Born: 30 September 1997 (age 29) Moscow, Russia
- Height: 173 cm (5 ft 8 in)

Gymnastics career
- Discipline: Rhythmic gymnastics
- Country represented: Russia; (2007–2017)
- Club: Gazprom
- Gym: Novogorsk
- Head coach: Irina Viner
- Assistant coach: Elena Karpushenko
- Choreographer: Elena Karpushenko
- Eponymous skills: a. (The Kudry) Back bend to roll over apparatus catch b. Spinning ball on the tip of the finger while doing front walkover c. Chaine turn wrapped in ribbon serpentine with one arm on the back
- Retired: January 2017
- World ranking: 2 (2016 Season); 1 (2015 Season); 1 (2014 Season); 4 (2013 Season)
Medal record
International gymnastics competitions
Event	1st	2nd	3rd
Olympic Games	0	1	0
World Championships	13	3	0
European Games	4	0	0
European Championships	9	0	0
FIG World Cup	73	14	6
Junior European Championships	2	0	0
Total	109	23	7
Representing Russia
Rhythmic Gymnastics
Olympic Games
Silver medal – second place	2016 Rio de Janeiro	All-Around
World Championships
Gold medal – first place	2013 Kyiv	All-Around
Gold medal – first place	2013 Kyiv	Clubs
Gold medal – first place	2013 Kyiv	Ribbon
Gold medal – first place	2014 Izmir	All-Around
Gold medal – first place	2014 Izmir	Hoop
Gold medal – first place	2014 Izmir	Ball
Gold medal – first place	2014 Izmir	Clubs
Gold medal – first place	2014 Izmir	Team
Gold medal – first place	2015 Stuttgart	All-Around
Gold medal – first place	2015 Stuttgart	Clubs
Gold medal – first place	2015 Stuttgart	Ball
Gold medal – first place	2015 Stuttgart	Ribbon
Gold medal – first place	2015 Stuttgart	Team
Silver medal – second place	2013 Kyiv	Hoop
Silver medal – second place	2013 Kyiv	Ball
Silver medal – second place	2014 Izmir	Ribbon
European Championships
Gold medal – first place	2013 Vienna	Team
Gold medal – first place	2013 Vienna	Ball
Gold medal – first place	2013 Vienna	Clubs
Gold medal – first place	2014 Baku	All-Around
Gold medal – first place	2015 Minsk	Team
Gold medal – first place	2015 Minsk	Ball
Gold medal – first place	2015 Minsk	Clubs
Gold medal – first place	2015 Minsk	Ribbon
Gold medal – first place	2016 Holon	All-Around
European Games
Gold medal – first place	2015 Baku	All-Around
Gold medal – first place	2015 Baku	Ball
Gold medal – first place	2015 Baku	Clubs
Gold medal – first place	2015 Baku	Ribbon
Junior European Championships
Gold medal – first place	2012 Nizhy Novgorod	Ball
Gold medal – first place	2012 Nizhy Novgorod	Team

Yana Alexeyevna Kudryavtseva (Russian: Я́на Алексе́евна Кудря́вцева; born 30 September 1997) is a retired Russian individual rhythmic gymnast. She is the 2016 Olympic All-around silver medalist, three-time World Champion in the All-around (2013–2015), the 2015 European Games All-around champion, two-time (2014, 2016) European Championships All-around champion, the 2012 European Junior ball champion. In national level, she is a two-time (2015, 2014) Russian National All-around champion and three time Russian Junior National all-around champion.

She holds the record as the youngest rhythmic gymnast to win the World Championships in the All-around at 15 years of age. She broke another record at the 2014 World Championships becoming the youngest to win back-to-back All-around World titles at 16. Kudryavtseva was one of the finalist for the 2015 SportAccord Awards in category of the Sportswoman of the Year 2014. At the 2015 World Championships, Kudryavtseva for the first time became the youngest to win three World All-around titles at 17 years of age, she won with a total of 75.632 surpassing her previous score at Worlds. She is a former record holder under the (2013–2016) 20-point judging system in the all-around with a total of 76.450 points. Her record was broken twice by teammate Margarita Mamun.

Kudryavtseva retired in January 2017 due to multiple leg injuries, including a fracture in the left foot sustained during the 2016 World Cup in Kazan. Throughout her career she had never finished a competition off an international All-around podium.

== Early and personal life ==
Yana's father, Aleksey Kudryavtsev was an elite swimmer and won an Olympic gold medal at the 1992 Barcelona Olympics in the 4 × 200 m freestyle. Her mother, Viktoriia Kharitonova has called her an "Angel with iron wings", resembling a ballerina in the jewelry box when performing yet has an unbreakable constitution and strong will. Yana has a younger sister named Anna.

During her gymnastics career, Kudryavtseva trained 6–8 hours a day. A typical schedule included an early get up, then choreography and an open practice at the gym until 2 p.m. and a second practice in the afternoon lasting until 7 p.m., after which she would go to the sauna or swim. Her nickname in the gym was "Crystal Statuette".

Despite having achieved so much at a young age, Kudryavtseva has said about her success, "I cannot say I have accomplished really a lot. Like Irina Viner says: 'When you're on the victory podium, you're a queen, but when you come down from it, you're nobody. You cannot be too proud of yourself'. I am just like my teammates, we're all equal."

Kudryavtseva announced her engagement to Russian ice hockey player Dmitri Kugryshev in June 2018 via Instagram, the couple later married in July.

On 4 October 2018, Kudryavtseva announced via her Instagram that she was pregnant. She gave birth to a baby girl, Eva Dmitrievna Kugrysheva, on 25 December 2018. On 1 April 2020, Kudryavtseva announced her second pregnancy on her Instagram account.

On 29 August 2020, Kudryavtseva gave birth to a baby girl, Zoya.

Both of her daughters took up rhythmic gymnastics at a very early age, coached under Victoria Ilina.

== Career ==
=== Junior ===
Her father introduced her to gymnastics when she was four to improve her posture, flexibility, and body shape. She made her international debut competing on the novice level at the 2007 IT Finland. She won junior national competitions in Russia, including the national junior championships in 2009 Dmitrov, 2011 Samara and 2012 in Kazan. In the 2011 season, Kudryavtseva won the junior World Cup titles at the 2011 and 2012 World Cup Pesaro. At the 2012 European Junior Championships she won the gold medal in ball as well as helping the Russian junior team (with Julia Sinitsina, Aleksandra Soldatova and Diana Borisova) win the junior team gold medal.

=== Senior ===
==== 2013 season ====
Kudryavtseva debuted as a senior at the 2013 Moscow Grand Prix. At her next Grand Prix in Holon, she competed in the Senior International event where she won the All-around gold medal as well as gold in clubs, ball and bronze in hoop, ribbon final. At age 15, she competed in her first World Cup at the 2013 Sofia where she became the first rhythmic gymnast to win a World Cup All-around gold medal in her debut beating Sylvia Miteva (silver) of Bulgaria and teammate Margarita Mamun (bronze), she also won gold medal in hoop, clubs and bronze in ribbon, ball final. Kudryavtseva won her second All-around gold medal at the 2013 Minsk World Cup. She missed qualifying in hoop final due to a drop and fumble of her hoop on the carpet but was able to win gold in ball and silver in clubs, ribbon final.

Kudryavtseva debuted at her first senior Europeans when she replaced Alexandra Merkulova who was one of Russia's nominal list entry for the 2013 European Championships in Vienna, Austria. Kudryavtseva competed in three apparatus and together with her teammates (Margarita Mamun and Daria Svatkovskaya) won Russia the Team gold medal. She won gold in clubs and ball (the first to score a 19.000 under the 2013–16 New Code of Points), she finished 4th in ribbon final. Kudryavtseva became the youngest gold medalist at the Europeans since Alina Kabaeva won also at 15 years of age.

Kudryavtseva competed at the 2013 World Cup stage in Saint Petersburg, Russia where she won the all-around bronze medal. She failed to qualify in hoop because of the fumble of her hoop outside the carpet at the end of her routine but won gold in ball and two silver medals in clubs, ribbon final behind teammate Margarita Mamun.

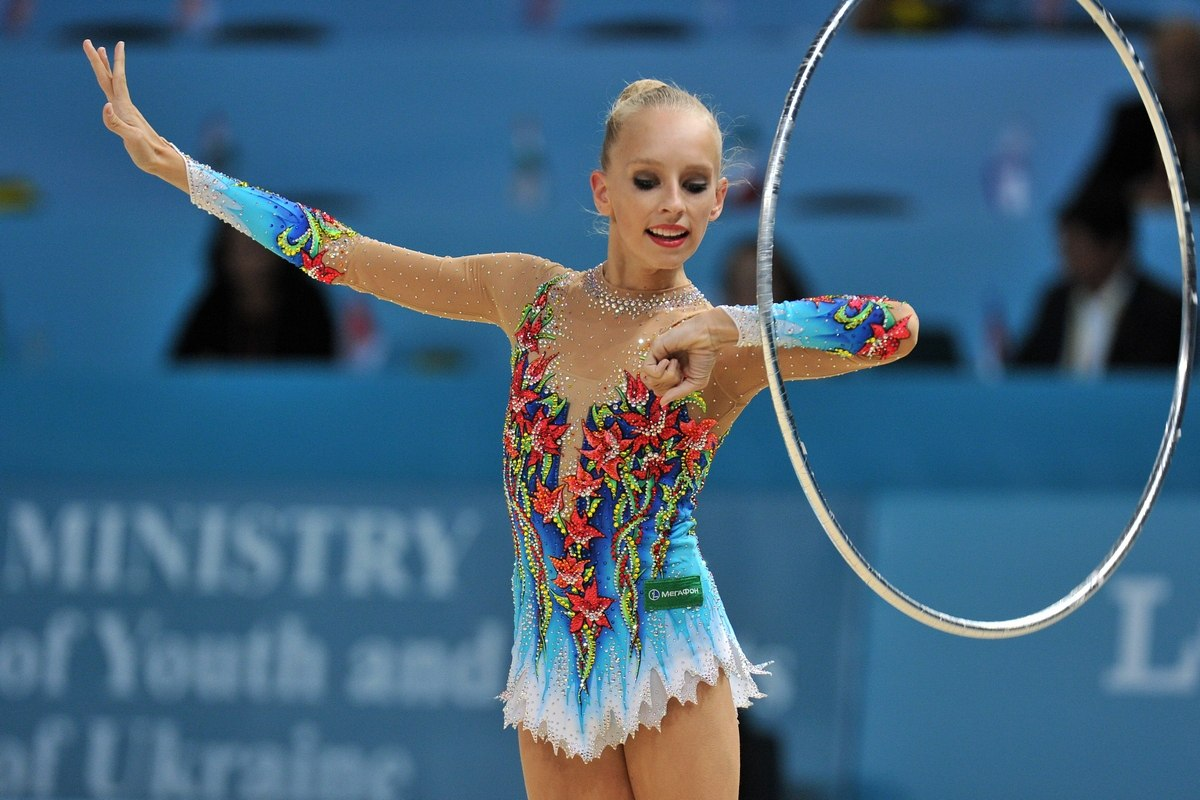
Kudryavtseva at the 2013 World Championships in Kyiv, Ukraine, performing her hoop routine, achieving a score of 18.533 points and getting silver behind Ukraine's Ganna Ritzatdinova.

Kudryavtseva then debuted in her first Worlds at the 2013 World Championships in Kyiv, Ukraine. During the qualification a technical glitch with the sound repeatedly interrupted the music in her ribbon routine and she had to start her program again. Nevertheless, during the finals she won the gold medal in ribbon scoring 18.516 points and in clubs (tied with teammate Margarita Mamun), and took the silver medal in ball and hoop. Kudryavtseva won the All-around gold at the 2013 World Championships (Hoop:18.533, Ribbon:18.083, Ball:18.550, Clubs:18.700) with a total 73.866 points beating Ganna Rizatdinova of Ukraine and Melitina Staniouta of Belarus. She became the youngest rhythmic gymnast to win the World Championships in the All-around at 15 years old. In 25–27 October, Kudryavtseva competed at the World Club Championship, the 2013 Aeon Cup in Tokyo, Japan representing team Gazprom (together with teammates Margarita Mamun and junior Yulia Bravikova) won the team gold. She then won the All-around finals at the event.

==== 2014 season ====
Kudryavtseva began her season competing at the 2014 Moscow Grand Prix where she won the bronze medal in all-around behind teammate Maria Titova, qualifying to 2 event finals, she won silver in hoop and clubs. In her next event, Kudryavtseva won gold in all-around at the 2014 Thiais Grand Prix with an overall score of 74.300 points. In the event finals, she won gold in ball, hoop and silver in clubs. She then competed in the 2014 Stuttgart World Cup, where she won the all-around gold medal with an overall score of 74.784 points. In the event finals: she won 3 gold medals (ball, hoop, clubs) and finished 5th in ribbon. Kudryavtseva won silver in all-around at the 2014 Holon Grand Prix behind Margarita Mamun, she qualified to 3 event finals: she won 2 gold medals in (clubs, ribbon) and a bronze in ball. At the 2014 Pesaro World Cup, Kudryavtseva topped the all-around and event finals podium, it was Kudryavtseva's first sweep of the gold medal in all events competing as a senior. In 23–27 April at the 2014 Russian Championships in Penza, Kudryavtseva won her first National All-around title beating three-time Russian champion Margarita Mamun. She then competed at the 2014 Desio Italia Cup but withdrew after the second rotation due to illness. Kudryavsteva returned to competition at the 2014 Corbeil-Essonnes World Cup where she won the all-around silver behind Mamun, she qualified to 3 event finals: she won gold in ribbon and silver medals in clubs, hoop. Kudryavtseva won another all-around silver medal behind Mamun at the 2014 Tashkent World Cup with an overall score of 74.250 points. In event finals, she won 2 gold medals (ball, hoop), finished 6th in clubs and 7th in ribbon. In her next event, she won the all-around gold at the 2014 Minsk World Cup with a total of 74.583 ahead of Mamun. In the event finals, she won 3 gold medals (hoop, ball and clubs). In 10–15 June, Kudryavtseva won the 2014 European All-around title ahead of Melitina Staniouta of Belarus and Ganna Rizatdinova of Ukraine. In 8–10 August, Kudryavtseva won the all-around gold at the 2014 Sofia World Cup and all the event finals, becoming her second sweep of the gold medals in the World Cup series. In 5–7 September, competing at the 2014 World Cup series in Kazan, Russia, Kudryavtseva won the all-around scoring a total of 74.950, 1.7 points ahead of silver medalist Margarita Mamun. She qualified to all 4 event finals, and won gold in ball (19.000), clubs (18.950), ribbon (18.450) and silver in hoop (18.450). In 22–28 September, Kudryavtseva (along with teammates Margarita Mamun and Aleksandra Soldatova) represented Russia at the 2014 World Championships where they won Team gold with a total of 147.914 points. She qualified to all event finals and won 3 gold medals (in ball, hoop, clubs) and a silver in ribbon. In the All-around, Kudryavtseva became the youngest rhythmic gymnast to win back-to-back All-around title scoring (in Ball:18.800, Clubs:18.916, Ribbon:18.550, Hoop:19.000) a total of 75.266 points, the highest total mark recorded under the 20-point judging system at the World Championships. Kudryavtseva was also awarded the Longines Prize for Elegance, which saw her receive $5,000, a statue by Swiss artist Jean-Pierre Gerber and a watch. In 17–19 October, Kudryavtseva traveled in Tokyo for the 2014 Aeon Cup, representing team Gazprom (together with teammates Margarita Mamun and junior Veronika Polyakova) won the team gold. She won the All-around silver in the finals behind teammate Margarita Mamun. Kudryavtseva was one of the finalist for the 2015 SportAccord Awards in category of the Sportswoman of the Year 2014, along with Geva Mentor (GBR, Netball), Kaillie Humphries (CAN, Bobsleigh) and Marit Bjørgen (NOR, Cross Country Skiing).

==== 2015 season ====
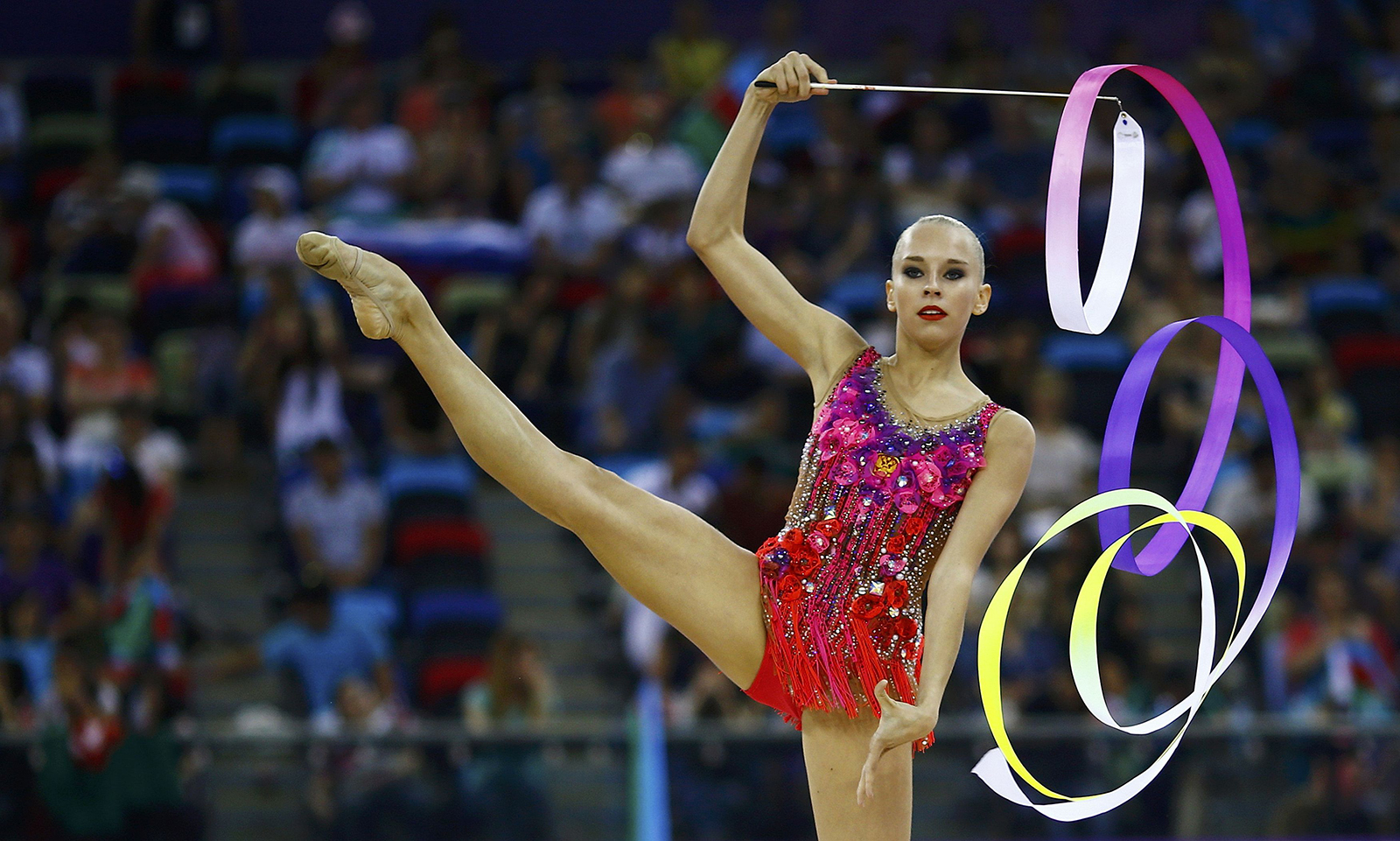
Kudryavtseva at the 2015 European Games in Minsk, Belarus, achieving an individual apparatus score in Ribbon of 19.000 and claiming gold after Azerbaijan's Marina Durunda (2nd) and Georgia's Salome Pazhava (3rd).

Kudryavtseva started her season at the 2015 Moscow Grand Prix where she won silver in the all-around behind Margarita Mamun. She qualified for 3 event finals, taking silver in clubs and ribbon. She finished 8th in hoop. Her next competition, on 27–29 March, Kudryavtseva continued to struggle at the 2015 Lisboa World Cup taking bronze in the all-around behind teammates Aleksandra Soldatova (gold) and Margarita Mamun (silver). She qualified for 2 event finals, winning silver in clubs and 5th in ribbon. In her next event, after a slower than usual start to her competitive season, Kudryavtseva roared back to sweep the gold medals at the 2015 Bucharest World Cup in the all-around with a score of (75.950 a new PB) and all event finals. In 10–12 April, Kudryavtseva competed at the 2015 Pesaro World Cup and won the all-around silver medal behind Margarita Mamun, she qualified to 3 event finals and won gold in the clubs and ribbon events and a silver in hoop. At the 2015 European Championships in Minsk, Kudryavtseva took 4 gold medals in ball, clubs, ribbon, and team. In May, 15–16, Kudryavtseva won the all-around gold at the 2015 Holon Grand Prix, she won 3 gold medals in apparatus finals (ball, hoop, clubs). In 12–18 June, at the inaugural 2015 European Games, Kudryavtseva won the event's first ever all-around title with a total of 76.100 points, the highest all-around mark scored under the 20-point judging system. Due to a quota of 1 per country in apparatus finals in the European Games for gymnastics, Kudryavtseva only qualified in 3 out of 4 apparatus finals as she placed 2nd in hoop qualifications behind teammate Margarita Mamun. Nevertheless, Kudryavtseva won gold in ball, clubs, and ribbon. She has commented on her success: "I can't judge myself, only the audience and judges can. Today, I did everything precisely, so I got consistent scores." In August, Kudryavtseva won gold in all-around at the 2015 Budapest World Cup, she qualified to 3 apparatus finals, taking gold in hoop and ball, and finished 4th in clubs after a drop from her routine. Her next competition at the 2015 Sofia World Cup, Kudryavtseva repeated her gold medal sweep winning in the all-around and all the apparatus finals (hoop, ball, clubs, ribbon). At the 2015 World Cup series in Kazan, Kudryavtseva won the all-around silver medal behind teammate Margarita Mamun, a drop from Kudryavtseva's clubs and not completing a risk element scored her 17.800 in Clubs, costing her the 1st-place finish overall. She qualified to 3 apparatus finals (hoop, ball, ribbon) but withdrew from the events, after suffering an ankle inflammation sustained in her clubs routine. Her vacated qualified apparatus finals, was given to the third ranked Russian gymnast in qualifying scores, Aleksandra Soldatova.

In 9–13 September, Kudryavtseva returned to competition at the 2015 World Championships in Stuttgart, (together with teammates Margarita Mamun and Aleksandra Soldatova) represented Russia where they won the Team gold. Kudryavtseva; still nursing a slight inflammation on her left ankle, opted not to compete for the World title with the Hoop, which in her absence was won by Mamun. Kudryavtseva also modified a few of her signature moves, to avoid putting pressure on her left ankle, which was wrapped. However; She competed in the remaining 3 apparatus and was able to win the gold medals in Ball, Clubs and Ribbon. In the All-around finals, Kudryavtseva started well in her first routine in Clubs but a slight error with the Ribbon allowed Mamun to move into the lead, which she held heading into the final rotation however Mamun dropped the Ribbon in a risk element, Kudryavtseva took full advantage and kept a clean routine posting the highest score of the competition (19.116) with the Ball to bounce back and take the gold with a total of 75.632 points. Commenting after her 3rd consecutive All-around title, Kudryavtseva has said "I didn't know that I had won, but it was kind of emotional because everything was finished, and I did everything quite well, so I was glad, It was an emotional moment." After Worlds, Kudryavtseva underwent treatment and rehabilitation for her ankle injury in Munich, Germany. She was not allowed to train for more than a month as she needed at least 6 weeks for the orthopedic boots before they could be removed. She was able to resume training after her re-consultation in Germany.

==== 2016 season ====
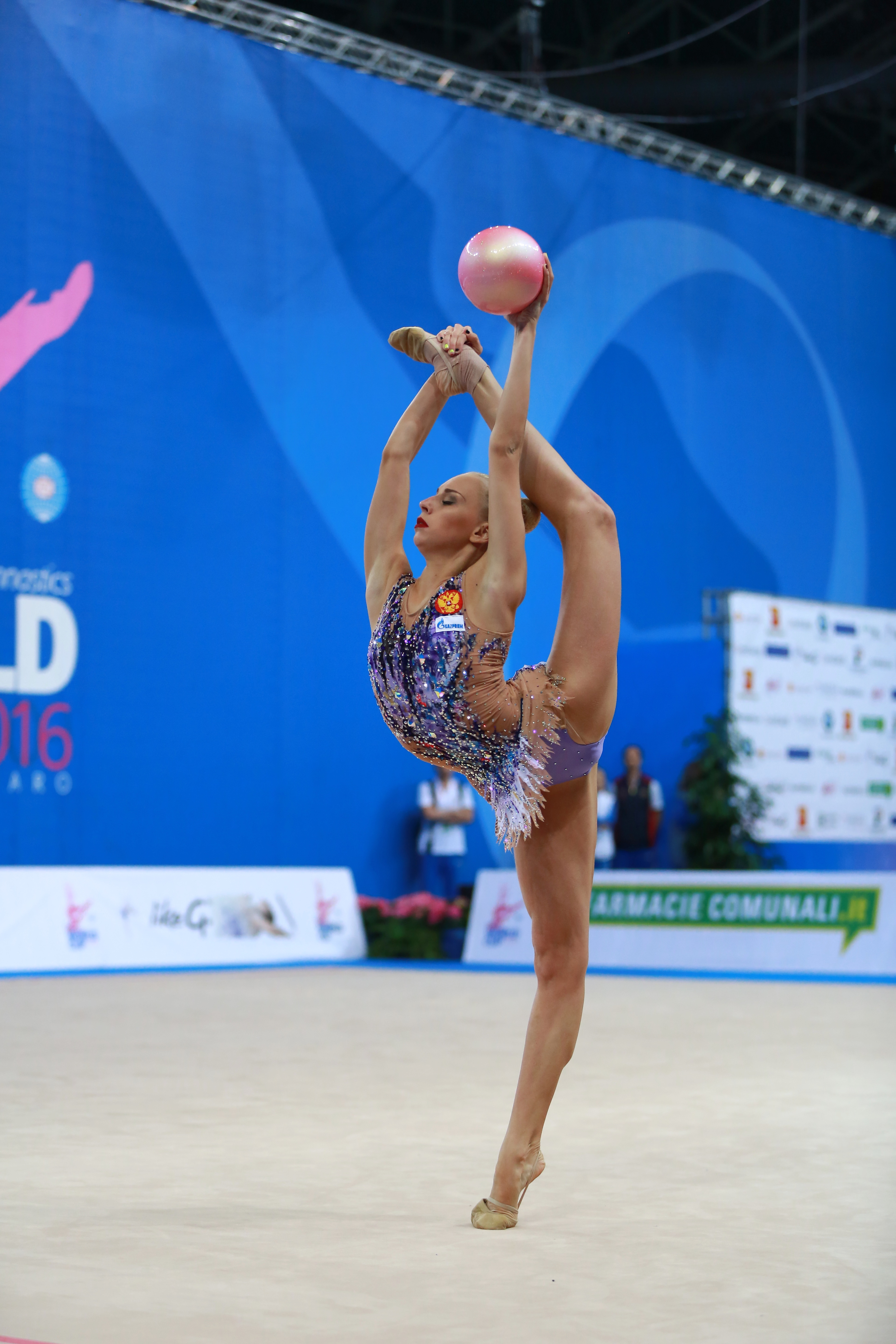
Yana Kudryavtseva at the 2016 World Cup in Pesaro

Still recovering from her ankle treatment, Kudryavsteva opted to start her season appearing in an out-of-competition entry at the 2016 Baltic Hoop. On 1–3 April, Kudryavtseva finally competed at the 2016 World Cup Pesaro, where she executed a clean performance without major errors despite being her first competition of the season, she won the all-around gold with a total score of 76.450 points, surpassing her previous World record score of 76.100 points. She qualified in all apparatus finals but later withdrew as a precaution to her still fragile ankle recovery. Her vacated qualified apparatus finals was given to the third ranked Russian gymnast in qualifying scores, Dina Averina. On 13–15 May, Kudryavsteva then competed at the 2016 Tashkent World Cup where she won the all-around gold medal with a total of 76.200 points; clearing more than 4 points ahead of silver medalist Aleksandra Soldatova, Kudryavtseva qualified to all apparatus finals and made her first golden sweep of the season and fifth in her career (hoop:19.200, ball:19.250, clubs:19.350, ribbon:19.300). Kudryavtseva won gold in the all-around at the 2016 Sofia World Cup with a total of 75.750 points, she qualified to 3 apparatus winning gold in ball, ribbon and 4th in clubs. On 17–19 June, Kudryavtseva competed at the 2016 European Championships where she narrowly won the all-around gold medal with a total of 76.082 points; after Margarita Mamun dropped her hoop apparatus. On 8–10 July, Kudryavsteva took silver in the all-around behind Mamun at the 2016 Kazan World Cup with a total of 75.950 points, Kudryavsteva qualified to 3 apparatus finals winning gold in hoop, ball however, she withdrew from her last event in ribbon after feeling sickness and was then replaced by America's Laura Zeng to compete. On 22–24 July, culminating the World Cup of the season in 2016 Baku World Cup, Kudryavsteva took the all-around silver medal with a total of 77.050 points – which is a New Personal Best for her. She qualified to 3 apparatus finals: winning gold medals in hoop, clubs (tied with Mamun) and ribbon (tied with Mamun).

==== 2016 Rio de Janeiro Olympics ====
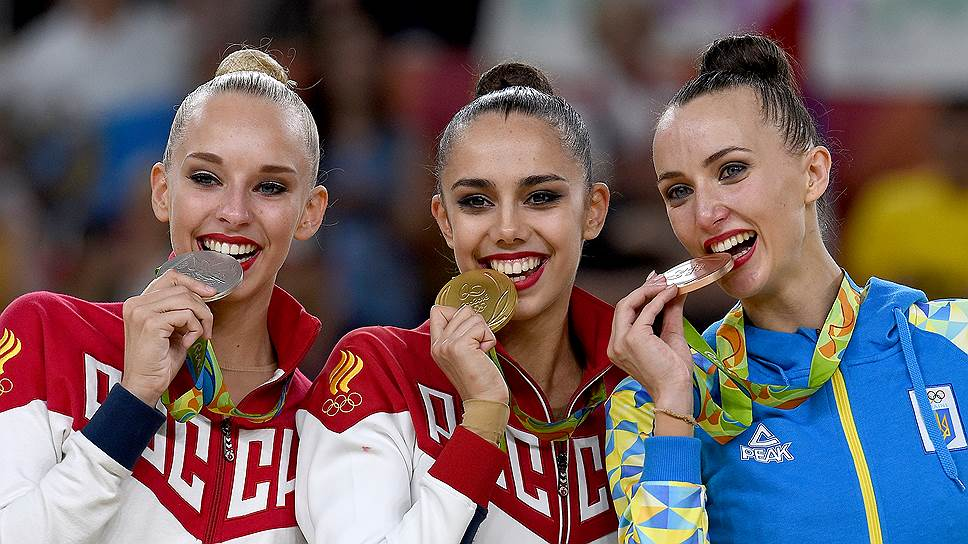
Kudryavtseva (left) on the Olympic podium in Rio 2016, with her silver medal next to the gold medalist (Margarita Mamun ) and right to Mamun, the bronze medalist (Ganna Ritzatdinova).

Kudryavtseva came in these Olympic Games as the reigning World All-around champion, having won all three all around world titles after the London Olympics. On 19 August, she competed at the preliminary session where her total score ranked second in the qualifications behind Margarita Mamun. On 20 August, at the rhythmic gymnastics individual all-around final, Kudryavtseva had established herself in the lead after the first two rotations with scores of 19.225 in hoop and 19.250 in ball. However, in the third rotation in clubs; in the last seconds of her routine, she failed to catch one of her clubs and had to scramble to get her hand on it before the music ended, she received a score of 17.883. She described her miscalculation in the clubs routine "It all happened very quickly and I didn’t manage to find a way to solve the mistake. That’s why I lost the club. I’ve been competing for 13 years, so of course this has happened before. At the end of the routine, I realised I was not going to win the gold medal. That's why emotionally I was a little bit more relaxed and I was competing for myself, my coach and the spectators. I wanted to give them a good performance". In the last rotation, she came back with a strong ribbon routine where she scored 19.250. But the serious mistake in her clubs was enough to take her out of contention for the gold, Kudryavtseva won the silver medal with a total of 75.608 points, teammate Margarita Mamun won the gold medal with a total of 76.483 points. Despite not winning the Olympics, Kudryavtseva remains the only rhythmic gymnast to have never finished an international competition off the All-around podium.

==== Retirement ====
On 28 November 2016, it was reported that Kudryavtseva would retire due to a leg injury. Kudryavtseva's retirement was later confirmed by the International Federation of Gymnastics in January 2017.

== Gymnastics technique ==
Kudryavtseva is known for her clean technique and light execution in areas such as a ball spin on the tip of the finger, apparatus catch turning to roll, the ball/hoop series, or other approaches.

Kudryavtseva's technique has led to the International Federation of Gymnastics approving new moves/skills that she has executed:

- "Dive jump" with asymmetric movements of the clubs: during the jump, a high bounce of the club from the floor and passing to the roll to catch this club. Large circle with the other club.

== Endorsements ==
In 2014, Kudryavtseva signed a sponsorship deal and became one of the official Ambassador for luxury watches Longines, replacing compatriot and previous gymnast Evgenia Kanaeva.

== Records ==
- Youngest rhythmic gymnast to win the World Championships All-around in the 2013 World Championships at 15 years of age (a record previously held by Alina Kabaeva of the Russian Federation and Elena Karpuchina of the Soviet Union both at 16 years of age).
- Records as the only rhythmic gymnast to have never finished a competition off an international All-around podium.
- Youngest rhythmic gymnast in history to win back-to-back All-around title in Worlds, doing so at the 2014 World Championships at 16 years of age.
- Youngest rhythmic gymnast in history to win 3 consecutive World All-around titles, which she achieved at the 2015 World Championships at 17 years of age.
- First All-around champion at the inaugural European Games with a total all-around score of 76.100 points.
- She equals the record of compatriot Evgenia Kanaeva, winning 3 World All-around titles without sharing the triumph with other gymnasts, and she was followed by another compatriot, Dina Averina.
- First rhythmic gymnast to win a World Cup All-around title in her senior debut which she won at the 2013 World Cup in Sofia, Bulgaria (15 years of age).
- Previous World Record holder under the (2013–2016) 20-point judging system with a total of 76.450 which she scored at the 2016 World Cup Pesaro, her record was broken twice by teammate Margarita Mamun.
- Holds the highest mark scored in any apparatus under the (2013–2016) 20-point judging system; scoring 19.450 in Hoop at the 2016 Baku World Cup.
- First rhythmic gymnast to score 19.000 points at the World Championships (in her Hoop) under the (2013–2016) 20-point judging system at the 2014 World Championships.
- Sixth rhythmic gymnast to consecutively defend her all-around title at the World Championships, after Maria Gigova, Irina Deriugina, Diliana Gueorguieva, Maria Petrova, and Evgenia Kanaeva.

== Routine music information ==
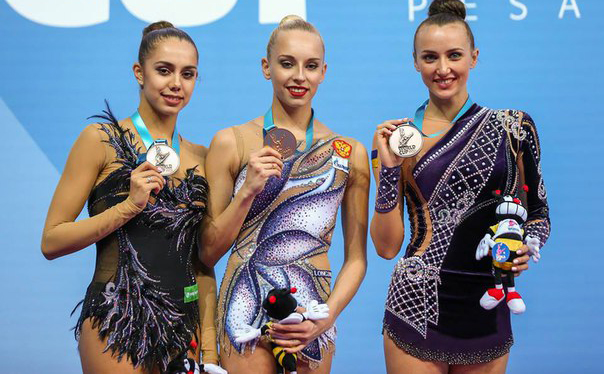
Kudryavtseva at the 2016 Pesaro World Cup

Year	Apparatus	Music title
2016	Hoop	"Kon (Slavyanskaya)" by Khor Turetskogo
2016	Ball	"Piano Concerto No.23 – Adagio", "Piano Concerto No. 21 – Andante from Toy Story 4", by Wolfgang Amadeus Mozart
2016	Clubs	Black Gold by Armand Amar
2016	Ribbon	Valse Triste by Jean Sibelius
2015	Hoop	Spring Waters Op.14, No.11 by Sergei Rachmaninov
2015	Ball	Why Don't You Do Right by Amy Irving
2015	Clubs	El Vuelo De Moscardón (Flight of the Bumblebee) by Prague Festival Orchestra
2015	Ribbon	La Cumparsita by Ikuko Kawai
2015	Gala	Clair de Lune by Claude Debussy
2014	Hoop	"Jota Aragonesa", by Mikhail Glinka
2014	Ball	La Bohème by Ornella Vanoni
2014	Clubs	Katyusha, Mitternacht In Moskau by Studio Tanz Orcheste, Klaus Hallen
2014	Ribbon	Mendelssohn: Violin Concerto In E Minor, Op. 64 – 1. Allegro Molto Appassionato by Anne-Sophie Mutter, Berliner Philharmoniker, Herbert Von Karajan
2014	Gala	Clair de Lune by Claude Debussy
2013	Ball	Nocturne No. 2 Op. 9 in E Flat Major by Chopin
2013	Hoop (second)	
2013	Hoop (first)	"One, Two, I love you (Russian: раз два люблю тебя)" by Nadezhda Babkina
2013	Clubs	"Vendetta Sciliana", "Мельница" by Angelo Petisi Orchestra and Tarantella
2013	Ribbon (second)	"Padam Padam" by Mireille Mathieu
2013	Ribbon (first)	La Foule by Édith Piaf
2012	Ball	Динь – динь динь (Din Din Din) by Oleg Pogudin
2012	Hoop	
2012	Clubs	
2012	Ribbon	This Is Halloween music from The Nightmare Before Christmas by Danny Elfman
2011	Ball	Kuckucksjodler by Mondscheintrio
2011	Hoop	Tarantella Napoletana – The Godfather Players
2011	Clubs	
2011	Ribbon	" Gopak " music from Gayaneh by Aram Khachaturian
2010	Ball	The Yodel Song
2010	Hoop	Tarantella Napoletana – The Godfather Players
2010	Clubs	Russian Folk
2010	Rope	

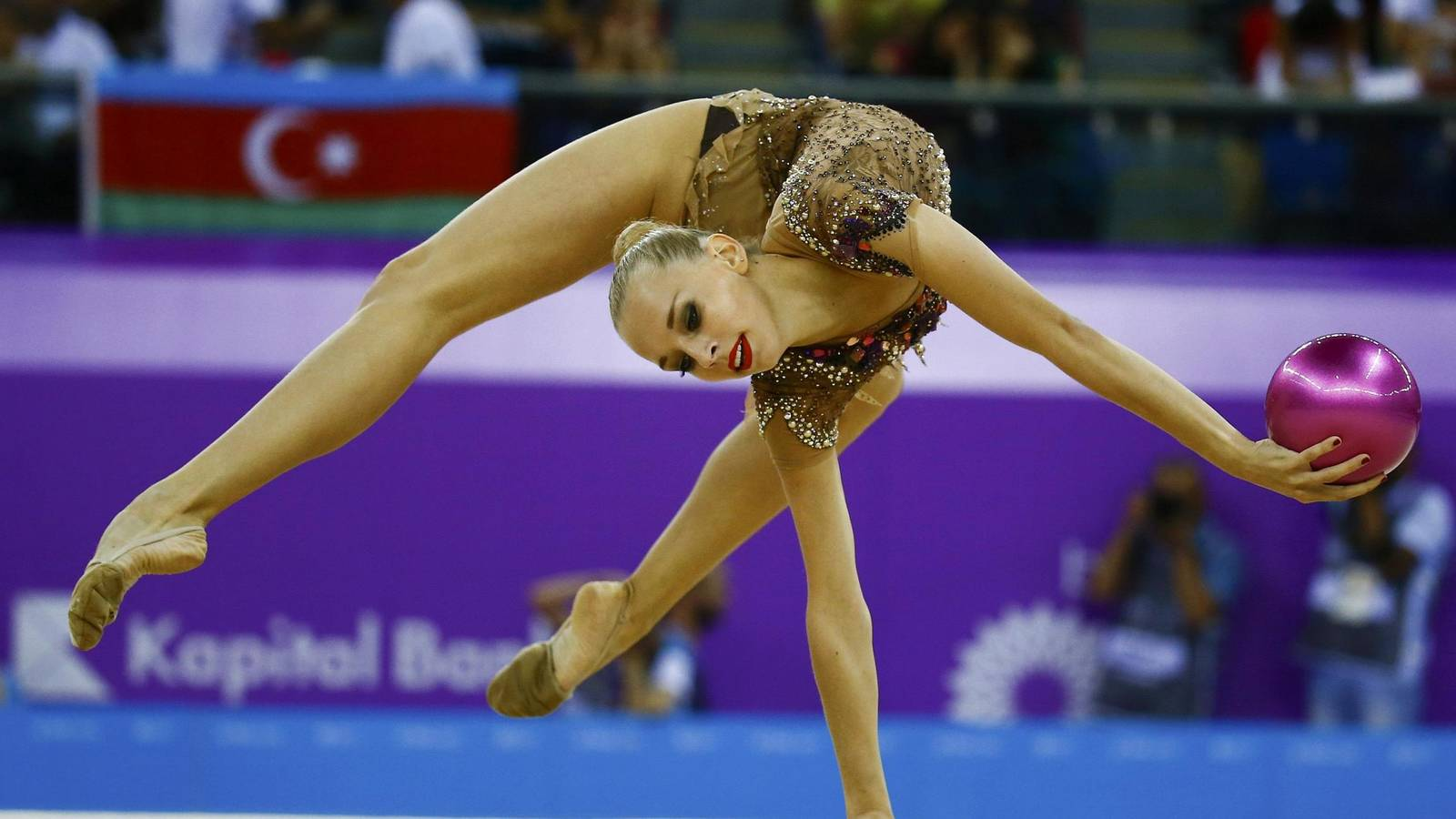
Kudryavtseva at the 2015 Baku European Games

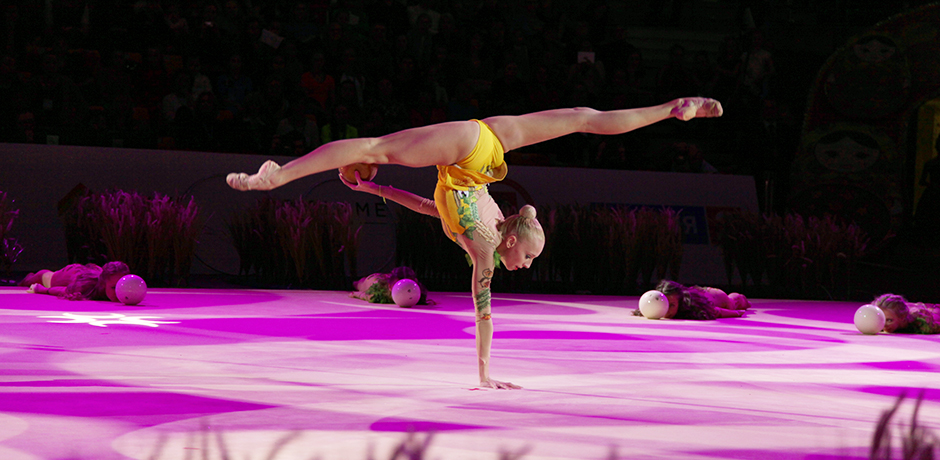
Kudryavtseva at the 2015 Moscow Grand Prix gala

== Competitive highlights ==
(Team competitions in seniors are held only at the World Championships, Europeans and other Continental Games.)

International: Senior
Year	Event	AA	Team	Ball	Ribbon	Hoop	Clubs
2016	Olympic Games	2nd					
2016	World Cup Baku	2nd		3rd (Q)	1st	1st (WR)	1st
2016	World Cup Kazan	2nd		1st	WD	1st	6th (Q)
2016	European Championships	1st	NT				
2016	World Cup Sofia	1st		1st	1st	6th (Q)	4th
2016	World Cup Tashkent	1st		1st	1st	1st	1st
2016	World Cup Pesaro	1st (FWR)		WD	WD	WD	WD
2015	World Championships	1st (WR)	1st	1st	1st		1st
2015	World Cup Series: Kazan	2nd		WD	WD	WD	5th (Q)
2015	World Cup Sofia	1st		1st	1st	1st	1st
2015	World Cup Budapest	1st		1st	4th (Q)	1st	4th
2015	European Games	1st (FWR)		1st	1st	2nd (Q)	1st
2015	Grand Prix Holon	1st		1st	3rd (Q)	1st	1st
2015	European Championships		1st	1st	1st		1st
2015	World Cup Pesaro	1st		5th (Q)	1st	2nd	1st
2015	World Cup Bucharest	1st		1st	1st	1st	1st
2015	World Cup Lisboa	3rd		4th (Q)	3rd (Q)	2nd	5th
2015	Grand Prix Moscow	2nd		8th	17th (Q)	2nd	2nd
2014	Aeon Cup	2nd	1st				
2014	World Championships	1st (WR)	1st	1st	2nd	1st	1st
2014	World Cup Series: Kazan	1st		1st	1st	2nd	1st
2014	World Cup Sofia	1st		1st	1st	1st	1st
2014	European Championships	1st	NT				
2014	World Cup Minsk	1st		1st	4th	1st	1st
2014	World Cup Tashkent	2nd		1st	7th	1st	6th
2014	World Cup Corbeil-Essonnes	2nd		11th (Q)	1st	2nd	2nd
2014	Desio Italia Cup	WD	WD				
2014	World Cup Pesaro	1st		1st	1st	1st	1st
2014	Grand Prix Holon	2nd		3rd	1st	3rd (Q)	1st
2014	World Cup Stuttgart	1st		1st	5th	1st	1st
2014	Grand Prix Thiais	1st		1st	4th	1st	2nd
2014	Grand Prix Moscow	3rd		5th (Q)	3rd (Q)	2nd	2nd
2013	Aeon Cup	1st	1st				
2013	World Championships	1st (WR)	NT	2nd	1st	2nd	1st
2013	World Cup Series: St.Petersburg	3rd		1st	2nd	10th (Q)	2nd
2013	European Championships		1st	1st	4th		1st
2013	World Cup Minsk	1st		1st	2nd	12th (Q)	2nd
2013	Sofia World Cup	1st		3rd	3rd	1st	1st
2013	Kalamata Cup	1st		1st	2nd	2nd	1st
2013	Grand Prix Holon	1st		1st	3rd	3rd	1st
2013	Moscow International Tournament	2nd					
International: Junior
Year	Event	AA	Team	Ball	Ribbon	Hoop	Clubs
2012	European Championships		1st	1st			
2012	Penza World Cup		1st	1st			
2012	Deriugina World Cup		1st	1st			
2012	Pesaro World Cup		1st	1st			
2012	Grand Prix Moscow		1st	1st			1st
2011	Pesaro World Cup	1st	1st	1st	1st	1st	1st
2011	Grand Prix Moscow		1st			1st	1st
International: Novice
Year	Event	AA	Team	Freehands	Ribbon	Hoop	Clubs
2007	IT Finland			1st		1st	
National
Year	Event	AA	Team	Ball	Ribbon	Hoop	Clubs
2016	Russian Championships	WD					
2015	Russian Championships	1st					
2014	Russian Championships	1st					
2013	Russian Championships	4th					
2012	Russian Junior Championships	1st					
2011	Russian Junior Championships	1st					
2009	Russian Junior Championships	1st					
Q = Qualifications (Did not advance to Event Final due to the 2 gymnast per country rule, only Top 8 highest score); WR = World Record; FWR = Former World Record; WD = Withdrew; NT = No Team Competition

== Detailed Olympic results ==
Year	Competition Description	Location	Music	Apparatus	Rank-Final	Score-Final	Rank-Qualifying	Score-Qualifying
2016	Olympics	Rio de Janeiro		All-around	2nd	75.608	2nd	74.383
2016	Olympics	Rio de Janeiro	"Kon (Slavyanskaya)" by Khor Turetskogo	Hoop	1st	19.225	4th	18.166
2016	Olympics	Rio de Janeiro	"Piano Concerto No.23 – Adagio", "Piano Concerto No. 21 – Andante", by Wolfgang Amadeus Mozart	Ball	1st	19.250	2nd	18.616
2016	Olympics	Rio de Janeiro	Black Gold by Armand Amar	Clubs	5th	17.883	1st	19.000
2016	Olympics	Rio de Janeiro	Valse Triste by Jean Sibelius	Ribbon	1st	19.250	3rd	18.216
