= Margarita Mamun =

Russian rhythmic gymnast

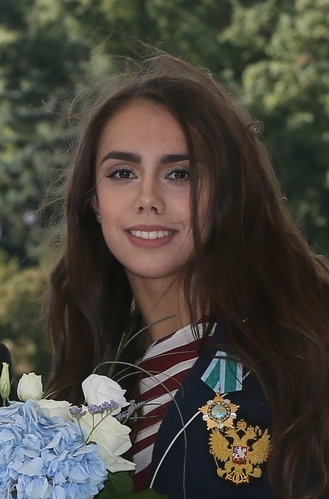
- Mamun in 2016

Personal information
- Nicknames: Rita; The Bengal Tigress
- Born: 1 November 1995 (age 30) Moscow, Russia
- Height: 170 cm (5 ft 7 in)
- Spouse: Alexandr Sukhorukov (m. 2017)

Gymnastics career
- Discipline: Rhythmic Gymnastics
- Country represented: Russia; (2011–2016)
- College team: Lesgaft National State University of Physical Education, Sport and Health
- Club: Gazprom
- Gym: Novogorsk
- Head coach: Irina Viner
- Assistant coach: Amina Zaripova
- Choreographer: Irina Zenovka
- Eponymous skills: Mamun's ball roll: From a sitting position, transit into a dynamic balance (arm stand), with ball rolling from trunk to feet and catch.
- Retired: 4th of November 2017
- World ranking: 1 (2016 Season); 2 (2015 Season); 2 (2014 Season); 1 (2013 Season); 17 (2012 Season); 22 (2011 Season)
Medal record
Rhythmic Gymnastics
Representing Russia
International gymnastics competitions
Event	1st	2nd	3rd
Olympic Games	1	0	0
World Championships	7	6	1
European Games	1	1	0
European Championships	4	5	0
FIG World Cup	51	33	10
Grand Prix Final	11	1	0
Summer Universiade	4	0	0
Total	79	46	11
Olympic Games
Gold medal – first place	2016 Rio de Janeiro	All-Around
World Championships
Gold medal – first place	2013 Kyiv	Ball
Gold medal – first place	2013 Kyiv	Clubs
Gold medal – first place	2014 Izmir	Ball
Gold medal – first place	2014 Izmir	Ribbon
Gold medal – first place	2014 Izmir	Team
Gold medal – first place	2015 Stuttgart	Hoop
Gold medal – first place	2015 Stuttgart	Team
Silver medal – second place	2014 Izmir	All-Around
Silver medal – second place	2014 Izmir	Hoop
Silver medal – second place	2014 Izmir	Clubs
Silver medal – second place	2015 Stuttgart	All-Around
Silver medal – second place	2015 Stuttgart	Ribbon
Silver medal – second place	2015 Stuttgart	Ball
Bronze medal – third place	2013 Kyiv	Hoop
European Championships
Gold medal – first place	2013 Vienna	Team
Gold medal – first place	2013 Vienna	Ribbon
Gold medal – first place	2015 Minsk	Team
Gold medal – first place	2015 Minsk	Hoop
Silver medal – second place	2013 Vienna	Hoop
Silver medal – second place	2013 Vienna	Ball
Silver medal – second place	2013 Vienna	Clubs
Silver medal – second place	2015 Minsk	Ball
Silver medal – second place	2016 Holon	All-Around
European Games
Gold medal – first place	2015 Baku	Hoop
Silver medal – second place	2015 Baku	All-Around
Grand Prix Final
Gold medal – first place	2013 Berlin	All-Around
Gold medal – first place	2013 Berlin	Hoop
Gold medal – first place	2013 Berlin	Ball
Gold medal – first place	2014 Innsbruck	All-Around
Gold medal – first place	2014 Innsbruck	Hoop
Gold medal – first place	2014 Innsbruck	Ball
Gold medal – first place	2014 Innsbruck	Clubs
Gold medal – first place	2014 Innsbruck	Ribbon
Gold medal – first place	2015 Brno	All-Around
Gold medal – first place	2015 Brno	Hoop
Gold medal – first place	2015 Brno	Ball
Silver medal – second place	2013 Berlin	Clubs
Summer Universiade
Gold medal – first place	2013 Kazan	All-Around
Gold medal – first place	2013 Kazan	Hoop
Gold medal – first place	2013 Kazan	Clubs
Gold medal – first place	2013 Kazan	Ribbon

Margarita Mamun (Russian: Маргарита Мамун; born 1st of November 1995) is a retired Russian individual rhythmic gymnast. She is the 2016 Olympic all-around champion, two-time (2015, 2014) World all-around silver medalist, the 2015 European Games all-around silver medalist, the 2016 European Championships all-around silver medalist, three-time (2015, 2014, 2013) Grand Prix Final all-around champion and a three-time (2011–2013) Russian National all-around champion.

== Early and personal life ==
Mamun was born in Moscow, Russia to a Bangladeshi father Abdullah Al Mamun, who was born in Rajshahi, Bangladesh, and had a master's degree in marine engineering, and a Russian mother Anna, a former rhythmic gymnast.

Mamun holds both Russian and Bangladeshi citizenship, and she has one younger brother named Filipp Al Mamun. On 26 August 2016, Mamun's father, Abdullah, died from cancer at the age of 52, two days after she returned to Russia from Brazil, six days after she won Olympic gold.

Shortly after the 2016 Olympic Games, Mamun became engaged to Olympic swimmer Alexandr Sukhorukov. The couple had been dating for three years when Sukhorukov proposed to Mamun at the Russian Olympic Ball. The couple married on 8 September 2017. On 17 July 2019, Mamun announced that she was pregnant through a post on her Instagram. On 3 October 2019, she gave birth to their son, Lev Alexandrovich Sukhorukov.

Following the Russian invasion of Ukraine in February 2022, she posted a picture of a blue sky and yellow meadow on Instagram with the caption "The World needs peace!", and in a May 2026 interview, she stated that she wanted the war to end and considered a "horror" that was not perceived as such by Russian society, then noted she was afraid to give that answer.

She resides in Moscow with her husband, son, and Pomeranian named Barney. She speaks English fluently, in addition to her native Russian. In a 2024 interview, Mamun revealed that her childhood dream is to learn to play the piano. She was later gifted a piano by her husband for her birthday.

== Gymnastics career ==
=== Junior ===
As a junior, Mamun competed in a number of international tournaments. She competed at the 2005 Miss Valentine Cup in Tartu, Estonia. She was coached by former rhythmic world champion Amina Zaripova. She briefly competed for Bangladesh at age 12 but returned to representing Russia as a senior.

=== Senior ===
==== 2011-2012 ====
Mamun competed at the 2011 International Tournament of Calais, where she won gold in the All-around and in hoop, clubs and ribbon final. She made her senior international breakthrough at the 2011 World Cup in Montreal, Quebec, Canada, where she won the bronze medal in all-around and gold in ball finals ahead of Liubov Charkashyna.

In the 2012 FIG World Cup series event in Kyiv (Deriugina Cup), Mamun won the bronze medal in hoop, ball and ribbon final. At the Sofia event of the 2012 World Cup series she won the all-around gold. She finished 4th in all-around at the Tashkent leg.

==== 2013 season ====
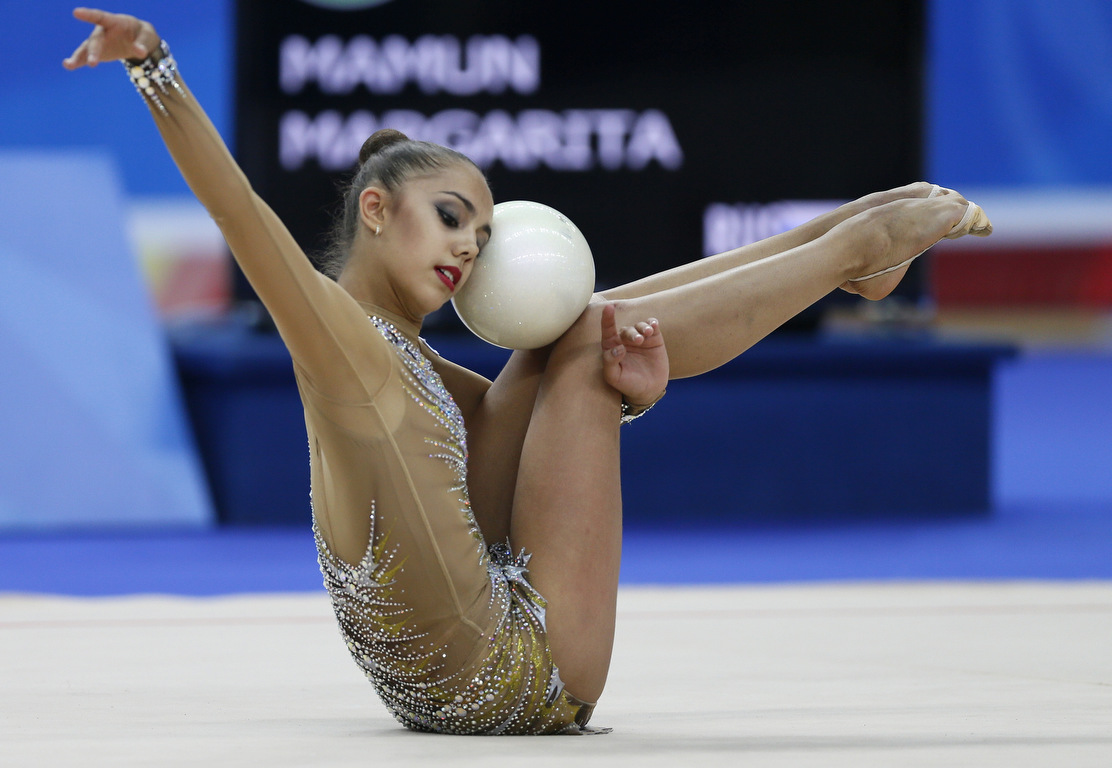
Mamun at the 2013 Summer Universiade in her starting position for ball.

In 2013, Mamun started her season competing at the Moscow Grand Prix winning the gold medal in all-around ahead of silver medalist Sylvia Miteva and teammate Daria Svatkovskaya. She also won gold in hoop, ball, clubs and bronze in ribbon final.

At the Thiais Grand Prix, Mamun won all the gold medals: All-around, hoop, ball, clubs and ribbon.

Mamun competed at the 2013 World Cup event in Sofia, where she won the bronze in all-around behind Bulgarian Sylvia Miteva. She won gold in ball and silver in ribbon final (tied with Ganna Rizatdinova).

Mamun competed at her first Senior Europeans at the 2013 European Championships in Vienna, Austria and together with her teammates (Yana Kudryavtseva and Daria Svatkovskaya ) won the team gold medal for Russia. At the event finals, she won gold in ribbon and three silver medals (ball, hoop and clubs). She then competed at the 2013 Summer Universiade, where she won gold in All-around ahead of teammate Alexandra Merkulova.

At the 2013 World Cup series in St.Petersburg, Russia, Mamun won the all-around gold medal and in the event finals, she won gold medal in (hoop, clubs, ribbon) and silver in ball. Mamun then competed at the 2013 World Championships in Kyiv, Ukraine, where she won gold medal in ball with a score of 18.516 points and shared the gold medal in clubs with teammate Yana Kudryavtseva; she also took bronze medal in hoop and placed 5th in ribbon final.

She then competed at the 2013 Grand Prix Brno and won the all-around gold ahead of Svatkovskaya, she won another gold in ribbon, ball, silver in hoop and bronze in clubs. Mamun won the all-around at the 2013 Grand Prix Final in Berlin and gold medal in hoop and ball, silver in clubs behind Daria Svatkovskaya and 5th in ribbon. On 25–27 October, Mamun competed at the world club championship, the AEON Cup, in Tokyo, Japan representing team Gazprom (together with teammates Yana Kudryavtseva and junior Yulia Bravikova) and won the team gold. She then won bronze in the All-around finals.

==== 2014 season ====
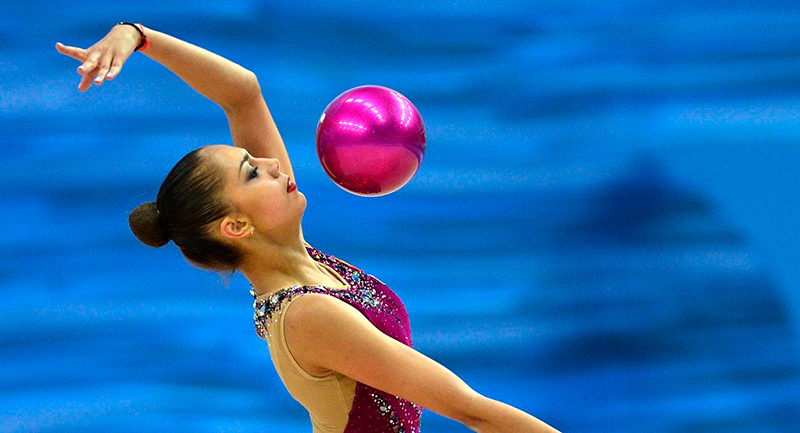
Mamun at the 2014 Kazan World Cup doing an element during her ball routine.

In 2014, Mamun began her competitive season at the 2014 Moscow Grand Prix where she won the all-around gold medal ahead of teammate Maria Titova. She then won three gold medals in the hoop, ball and clubs event finals and silver in ribbon.

Mamun then competed at the 2014 World Cup series event in Stuttgart, where she won all-around silver. In event finals she won gold in ball, hoop (both tied with Kudryavtseva) and ribbon, and won bronze in ball (tied with Rizatdinova ). Mamun won the all-around gold at the 2014 Holon Grand Prix ahead of Kudryavtseva; in the event finals: she won gold medals in ball and hoop, silver in ribbon.

On 23–27 April, Mamun competed as the defending national champion at the 2014 Russian Championships, where she won the All-around silver medal, behind Kudryavtseva. Mamun then competed at the 2014 Desio Italia Cup and won the all-around gold medal. On 9–11 May, Mamun won the all-around gold at the 2014 World Cup event in Corbeil-Essonnes. She qualified to 4 event finals and won gold in clubs, silver in ribbon, 6th in ball and 5th in hoop. On 22–24 May, Mamun won her second World Cup all-around title of the season at Tashkent scoring an overall total of 74.750 points, ahead of teammates Yana Kudryavtseva (silver) and Aleksandra Soldatova (bronze). In the event finals, she won gold in clubs, ribbon, a silver in ball and finished 5th in hoop. In her next event, Mamun won the all-around bronze medal at the Minsk leg of the World Cup series, behind Melitina Staniouta. She qualified to 3 event finals winning the silver medal in (ribbon, ball and clubs).

On 10–15 June, Mamun competed at the 2014 European Championships and finished 5th in all-around after a mistake ridden hoop routine and 3 drops in her clubs routine. Mamun returned to competition in August and took the silver medal in all-around at the 2014 Sofia World Cup, she qualified to 2 event finals and won silver in ball and clubs. On 5–7 September, competing at the 2014 World Cup series in Kazan, Mamun took the all-around silver medal behind Kudryavtseva with a total of 73.250 points. She qualified to 3 event finals and won gold in hoop, silver in ball and placed 4th in ribbon.

On 22–28 September, Mamun (along with teammates Yana Kudryavtseva and Aleksandra Soldatova) represented Russia at the 2014 World Championships where they won Team gold with a total of 147.914 points. She qualified to all event finals and won 2 gold medals in ribbon and ball (tied with Kudryavtseva), 2 silver in hoop, clubs. In the All-around, Mamun won the all-around silver medal with a total of 74.149 points, behind compatriot Kudryavtseva. On 17–19 October, Mamun traveled in Tokyo for the 2014 Aeon Cup, representing team Gazprom (together with teammates Yana Kudryavtseva and junior Veronika Polyakova) won the team gold. She won the All-around gold in the finals beating teammate Kudryavtseva. In 1–3 November, Mamun won the all-around gold at the 2014 Grand Prix Brno. On 14–16 November, Mamun won the 2014 Grand Prix Final in Innsbruck, Austria, sweeping the all-around and event final gold medals.

==== 2015 season ====
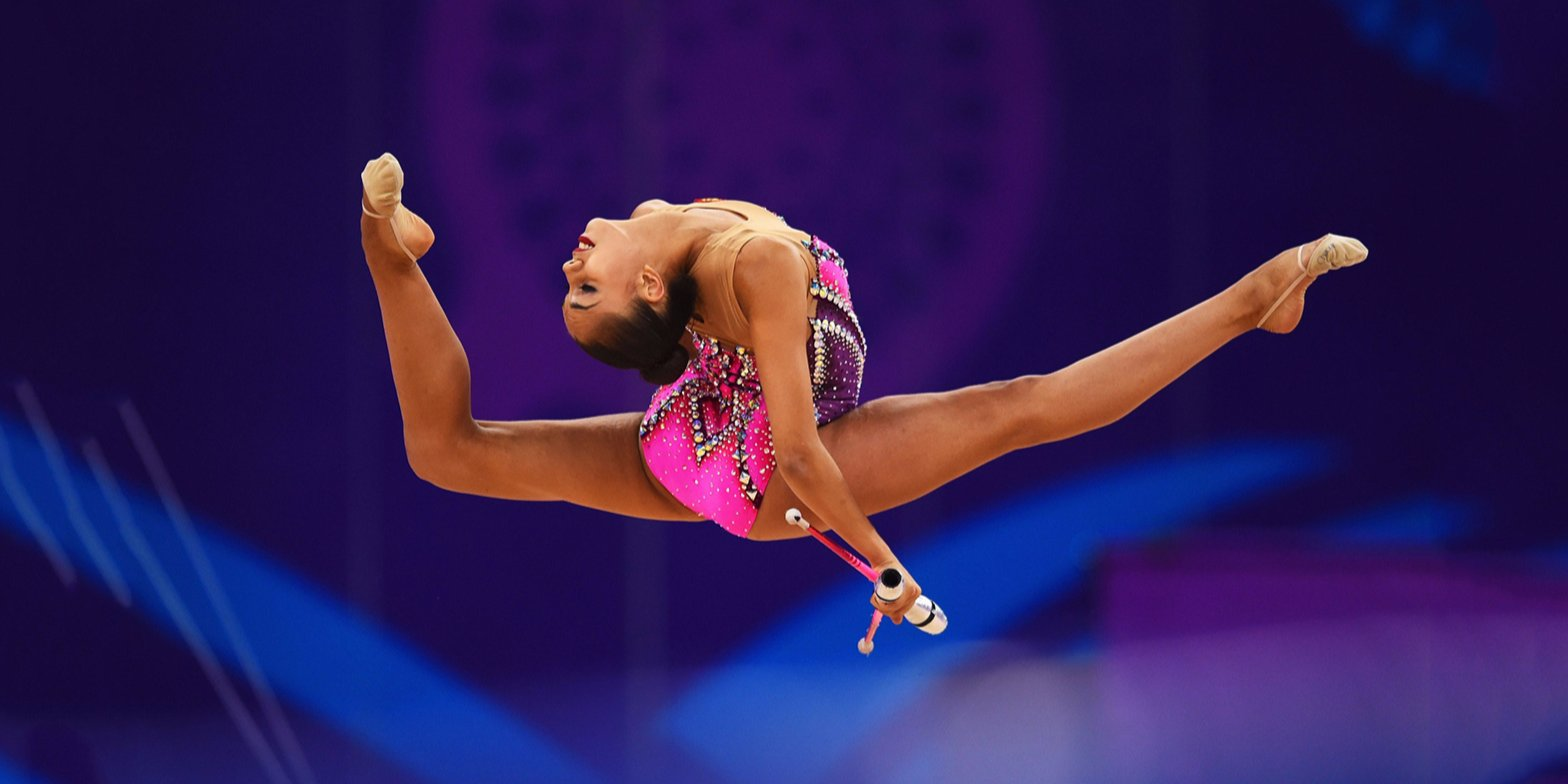
Mamun performing her clubs routine in 2015

In 2015, Mamun started her season at the 2015 Moscow Grand Prix where she won gold in the all-around, ribbon and hoop finals.

On 13–15 March, Mamun won the gold medal at the Trophy de Barcelona in the all-around, (ball, ribbon, clubs) and silver in hoop. On 27–29 March, Mamun competed at the 2015 Lisbon World Cup, a series of drops in her clubs cost Mamun the gold medal, but she took 2nd place in the all-around total behind rising teammate Aleksandra Soldatova. She qualified to 3 event finals, taking gold in hoop, ball and ribbon. On 3–5 April, Mamun competed at the 2015 Bucharest World Cup winning the all-around silver behind Kudryavtseva. She qualified 2 event finals and won silver in hoop and ball.

On 1–3 May, Mamun competed at the 2015 European Championships where she together with Yana Kudryavtseva and Aleksandra Soldatova won team gold for Russia. She qualified to 3 event finals, winning gold in hoop, silver in ball and 5th in ribbon. On 15–16 May, Mamun won the all-around silver at the 2015 Holon Grand Prix, she qualified 3 event finals, winning silver in hoop and bronze (clubs, ribbon).

Mamun won the all-around gold at the 2015 Berlin Grand Prix with a total of 75.350 points, she won 3 golds in apparatus finals (hoop, ball, clubs) and bronze in ribbon. On 12–28 June, Mamun participated at the inaugural 2015 European Games in Baku, where she won the silver medal in the all-around with a total of 75.650 points (a personal best). She won gold in hoop finals, the only event she scored higher than Yana Kudryavtseva in qualifications (a quota of 1 per country in apparatus finals in the European Games for gymnastics). In August, Mamun competed at the 2015 Budapest World Cup, winning silver in all-around behind Kudryavtseva.

At the 2015 Sofia World Cup, Mamun won the all-around silver medal, she qualified to 3 apparatus finals, taking silver in hoop, ribbon and finished 8th in ball after a drop from a risk and with her retrieving the apparatus, rolling out of the carpet. At the 2015 World Cup stage in Kazan, Mamun won the all-around gold medal with a total of 75.550 points beating teammate Yana Kudryavtseva, Mamun's momentum was built further after a drop from Kudryavtseva's clubs and not completing a risk element scored only 17.800. Mamun qualified to all apparatus, showing her best results for the finals in Hoop (19.100), Ball (19.050), Clubs (19.100) and Ribbon (19.100).

On 9–13 September, at the 2015 World Championships in Stuttgart, Mamun (together with teammates Yana Kudryavtseva and Aleksandra Soldatova) represented Russia, where they won the team gold. She qualified to 3 apparatus finals, taking gold in hoop and two silver medals (ribbon, ball). In the All-around finals; Mamun was ranked 1st from 2nd rotation leading into the last rotation; until she dropped her ribbon in a risk element, she eventually won the silver medal behind compatriot Yana Kudryavtseva. Mamun was awarded with the Longines Prize for Elegance at the Championships.

On 2–4 October, Mamun together with teammates Aleksandra Soldatova and junior Alina Ermolova represented Team Gazprom at the 2015 Aeon Cup in Tokyo Japan, Mamun the individual all-around title and with Team Russia winning the gold medal in the overall standings. Mamun then competed at the 2015 Grand Prix Final in Brno, where she won the all-around gold medal with a total of 76.050, a personal best score.

==== 2016 season ====
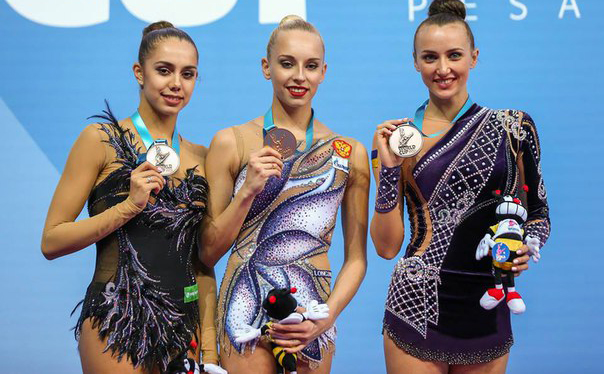
Mamun (left) at the 2016 Pesaro World Cup, next to her is former teammate Yana Kudryavtseva, next to the gold medalist is Ukraine's bronze medalist is Ganna Ritzatdinova.

In 2016, Mamun started her season at the 2016 Moscow Grand Prix finishing 4th in the all-around, she qualified to 2 apparatus finals taking gold in clubs and ball (tied with teammate Aleksandra Soldatova). On 12–13 March, Mamun competed at the MTM Tournament in Ljubljana, Slovenia where she won the all-around gold with a total of 75.950 points,

At the 30th Thiais Grand Prix event in Paris, Mamun won the all-around gold ahead of teammate Aleksandra Soldatova, she qualified 3 event finals, taking gold in hoop, clubs and silver in ball. On 1–3 April, Mamun competed at the 2016 Pesaro World Cup where she won the all-around silver with a total of 75.900 points (a new Personal Best) behind teammate Yana Kudryavtseva, she qualified to 3 apparatus finals taking gold in hoop, clubs, placed 5th in ball and 4th in ribbon. Mamun won the all-around silver behind Aleksandra Soldatova at the 2016 Russian Championships held in Sochi.

On 6–8 May, Mamun competed at the 2016 Brno Grand Prix where she won the all-around gold breaking her Personal Best score with a total of 77.100 points; she also swept the gold medals in all 4 apparatus finals (hoop, ball, clubs, ribbon). She won another gold medal in the all-around at the 2016 Minsk World Cup with a total of 75.700 points, she also won all 4 of the apparatus finals.

On 3–5 June, Mamun won the all-around gold at the 2016 Guadalajara World Cup with a total score of 76.550 points, in the apparatus finals: she also won gold in hoop, clubs, ribbon and placed 4th in ball. On 17–19 June, Mamun competed at the 2016 European Championships, she dropped her hoop once however she scored well in her remaining apparatus in ball(19.166), ribbon(19.133) and Clubs(19.333) – a European record under the 20 point CoP judging system; her overall results were enough to win her the all-around silver medal ahead of Ukraine's Ganna Rizatdinova.

On 8–10 July, Mamun won the all-around gold medal at the 2016 Kazan World Cup with a total of 77.050 points, beating teammate Kudryavsteva by more than 2 points. She also qualified to all four apparatus finals and took gold in clubs and ribbon and silver in hoop and ball. On 22–24 July, at the 2016 Baku World Cup, the last World Cup of the season, Mamun won another all-around gold after she narrowly defeated Kudryavsteva. In the apparatus finals, Mamun won gold medals in ball, clubs, and ribbon (clubs and ribbon tied with Kudryavsteva), and silver in hoop.

==== 2016 Rio de Janeiro Olympics ====
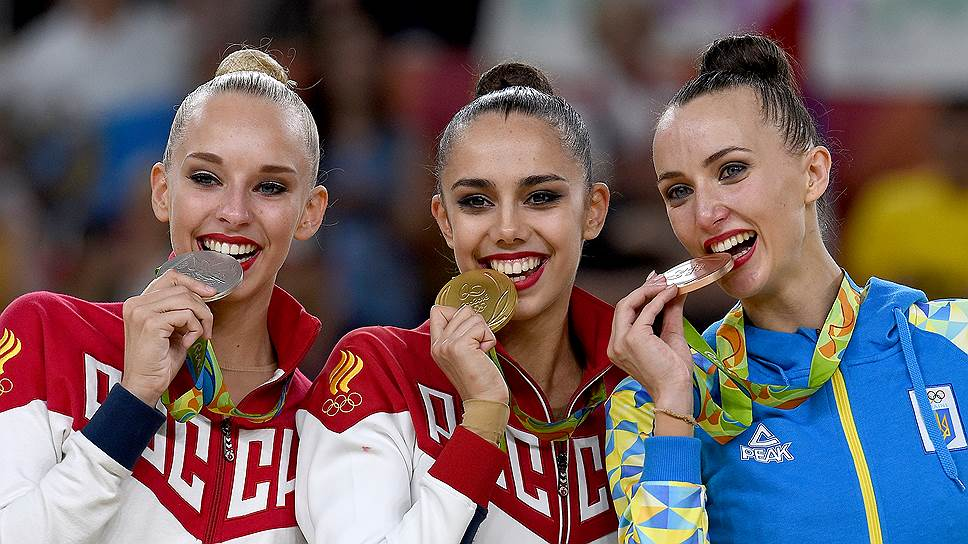
Mamun (center) on the Olympic podium with her gold medal, left is teammate Yana Kudryavtseva, on the right of Mamun is Ukraine's Ganna Ritzatdinova.

On 19 August, Mamun competed at the preliminary session where she earned the top score in the qualifications. On 20 August, at the rhythmic gymnastics individual all-around final, Mamun was trailing Kudryavsteva after the second rotation; but in the third rotation in clubs; at the last seconds of Kudryavtseva's routine, Kudryavsteva failed to catch one of her clubs and had to scramble to get her hand on it before the music ended. Mamun kept her composure and rallied in her clubs and with her ribbon routine sealed her the Olympic gold medal scoring a total of 76.483 points edging out World Champion Yana Kudryavtseva who won the silver medal. Mamun was the only gymnast in the final to have scores over 19 points (out of 20) on all four apparatus.

=== Retirement ===
On 4 November 2017, Irina Viner officially announced to the Russian press that Mamun has completed her competitive career in rhythmic gymnastics.

== Post-Olympics career ==
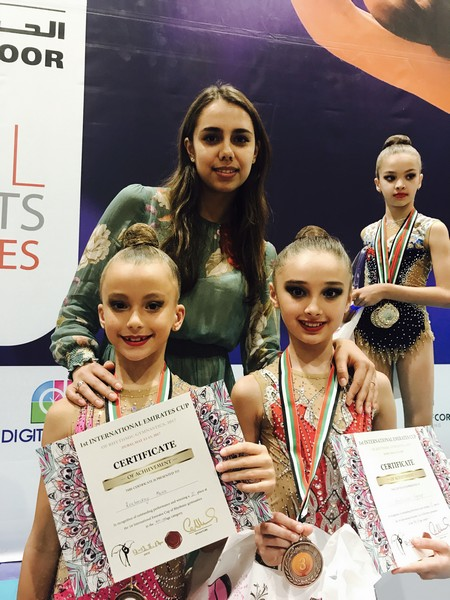
Margarita Mamun with young gymnasts in 2017 in Disneyland Paris.

Mamun was the protagonist of Polish director, Marta Prus' 2017 documentary film Over the Limit, which detailed her preparation for the 2016 Olympics in Rio, as well as Mamun's relationship with her father, who was diagnosed with terminal cancer. The film was screened internationally and later made available for streaming platforms after its release.

In 2024, she was the subject of a 90-minute YouTube video by Russian vlogger, Vitya Kravchenko. In the film, Mamun discussed the verbal abuse that she faced from coaches during her gymnastics career. She also revealed that a deceased and unnamed male coach sexually harassed her from aged 9 to 13; the abuse stopped when she found a new coach. She revealed that she cannot be alone with male doctors due to psychological trauma. Mamun, who did not tell her parents about the sexual harassment due to her strict South Asian upbringing, stated that she believes children should be taught sex education in Russian schools, in order to recognise signs of sexual abuse.

== Routine music information ==
Year	Apparatus	Music title
2016	Hoop (2nd)	Concerto de Berlin by Vladimir Cosma
2016	Hoop (1st)	Concerto No. 1 in G for Cello and Orchestra, Op. 49: I. Allegro by Yo-Yo Ma, Dmitri Kabalevsky & Dmitry Shostakovich
2016	Ball	Morceaux De Fantasie, Op.3:I.Elegie by Mischa Maisky
2016	Clubs	We Will Rock You by Queen, Pink
2016	Ribbon	A New Swan Queen, Night of Terror, Perfection music from Black Swan by Clint Mansell
2016	Gala	At Home Among Strangers by Eduard Artemyev (Три товарища – Эдуард Артемьев)
2015	Hoop	Oblivion by Astor Piazzolla, performed by Gidon Kremer
2015	Ball	Boléro by Maurice Ravel
2015	Clubs	Single Ladies (Put a Ring on It) by Beyoncé
2015	Ribbon	Grand Duet for cello and piano by Galina Ustvolskaya, performed by Mstislav Rostropovich, Alexei Lubimov
2015	Gala	Maybe I Maybe You by Scorpions
2014	Hoop	Spartacus – Ballet Suite No. 2: Adagio of Spartacus and Phrygia by Aram Khachaturian
2014	Ball	Memorial by Michael Nyman
2014	Clubs (2nd)	Sphynx (Club Mix) by Giampiero Ponte, Moran
2014	Clubs (1st)	Lolo, Lolo, Lolo by Sevda Alakbarzadeh
2014	Ribbon	Giselle: No. 18, Giselle: No. 19 – Allegro by London Philharmonic Orchestra
2014	Gala	Maybe I Maybe You by Scorpions
2013	Hoop	Dona Francisquita – Fandango by Maria Bayo, Plácido Domingo, Alfredo Kraus
2013	Ball	Nocturne in C sharp minor by Chopin
2013	Clubs	I Love Paris by Peter Cincotti
2013	Ribbon	Echo of Love by Anna German
2012	Hoop	La Bohème (instrumental) by Charles Aznavour
2012	Ball	Song from a Secret Garden by Secret Garden
2012	Clubs	Andalucia / Taliquete by Bill Whelan / Miguel Czachowski
2012	Ribbon (second)	Ne Me Quitte Pas by Jacques Brel
2012	Ribbon (first)	"Money Money Money" music from royal philharmonic orchestra plays Pink Floyd by The royal philharmonic orchestra
2011	Hoop	Spiral by Peter Frohmader
2011	Clubs	Caravane / Der Bauch / Istikhbar by Radar / MC Sultan / Gnawa Diffusion
2011	Ball	Song from a Secret Garden by Secret Garden
2011	Ribbon	Tombe la neige by Raymond Lefevre

== Detailed Olympic results ==
Year	Competition Description	Location	Music	Apparatus	Rank-Final	Score-Final	Rank-Qualifying	Score-Qualifying
2016	Olympics	Rio de Janeiro		All-around	1st	76.483	1st	74.383
2016	Olympics	Rio de Janeiro	Concerto de Berlin by Vladimir Cosma	Hoop	2nd	19.050	1st	18.833
2016	Olympics	Rio de Janeiro	Morceaux De Fantasie, Op.3:I.Elegie by Mischa Maisky	Ball	2nd	19.150	1st	19.000
2016	Olympics	Rio de Janeiro	We Will Rock You by Queen, Pink	Clubs	1st	19.050	11th	17.500
2016	Olympics	Rio de Janeiro	A New Swan Queen, Night of Terror, Perfection music from The Black Swan by Clint Mansell	Ribbon	2nd	19.233	1st	19.050

== Competitive highlights ==
(Team competitions in seniors are held only at the World Championships, Europeans and other Continental Games.)

International: Senior
Year	Event	AA	Team	Hoop	Ball	Clubs	Ribbon
2016	Aeon Cup	1st	1st				
2016	Olympic Games	1st					
2016	World Cup Baku	1st		2nd	1st	1st	1st
2016	World Cup Kazan	1st		3rd	2nd	1st	1st
2016	European Championships	2nd	NT				
2016	World Cup Guadalajara	1st		1st	4th	1st	1st
2016	World Cup Minsk	1st		1st	1st	1st	1st
2016	Grand Prix Brno	1st		1st	1st	1st	1st
2016	World Cup Pesaro	2nd		1st	5th	1st	4th
2016	Grand Prix Thiais	1st		1st	2nd	1st	8th (Q)
2016	Grand Prix Moscow	4th		12th (Q)	1st	1st	6th (Q)
2015	Aeon Cup	1st	1st				
2015	Grand Prix Final: Brno	1st		1st	1st	WD	WD
2015	World Championships	2nd	1st	1st	2nd		2nd
2015	World Cup Kazan	1st		1st	1st	1st	1st
2015	World Cup Sofia	2nd		2nd	8th	11th (Q)	2nd
2015	World Cup Budapest	2nd		2nd	2nd	1st	2nd
2015	Grand Prix Berlin	1st		1st	1st	1st	3rd
2015	World Cup Tashkent	1st		1st	1st	1st	1st
2015	European Games	2nd		1st	2nd (Q)	2nd (Q)	2nd (Q)
2015	Grand Prix Holon	2nd		2nd	5th (Q)	3rd	3rd
2015	European Championships		1st	1st	2nd		5th
2015	World Cup Pesaro	2nd		1st	3rd	2nd	4th (Q)
2015	World Cup Bucharest	2nd		2nd	2nd	4th (Q)	3rd (Q)
2015	World Cup Lisbon	2nd		1st	1st	17th (Q)	1st
2015	Grand Prix Barcelona	1st		2nd	1st	1st	1st
2015	Grand Prix Moscow	1st		1st	2nd	18th (Q)	1st
2014	Aeon Cup	1st	1st				
2014	Grand Prix Final: Innsbruck	1st		1st	1st	1st	1st
2014	Grand Prix Brno	1st		1st	1st	1st	1st
2014	World Championships	2nd	1st	2nd	1st	2nd	1st
2014	World Cup Kazan	2nd		1st	2nd	11th (Q)	4th
2014	World Cup Sofia	2nd		8th (Q)	2nd	2nd	4th (Q)
2014	European Championships	5th	NT				
2014	World Cup Minsk	3rd		15th (Q)	2nd	2nd	2nd
2014	World Cup Tashkent	1st		5th	2nd	1st	1st
2014	World Cup Corbeil-Essonnes	1st		6th	5th	1st	2nd
2014	World Cup Pesaro	2nd		2nd	2nd	3rd (Q)	4th (Q)
2014	Grand Prix Holon	1st		2nd	1st	3rd (Q)	2nd
2014	World Cup Stuttgart	2nd		1st	3rd	1st	1st
2014	Grand Prix Thiais	2nd		2nd	15th (Q)	1st	4th (Q)
2014	Grand Prix Moscow	1st		1st	1st	1st	2nd
2013	Aeon Cup	3rd	1st				
2013	Grand Prix Final: Berlin	1st		1st	2nd	1st	5th
2013	Grand Prix Brno	1st		2nd	1st	3rd	1st
2013	World Championships	6th	NT	3rd	1st	1st	5th
2013	World Cup St. Petersburg	1st		1st	2nd	1st	1st
2013	Summer Universiade	1st		1st	8th	1st	1st
2013	European Championships		1st	2nd	2nd	2nd	1st
2013	World Cup Corbeil-Essonnes	3rd		1st	1st	2nd	1st
2013	World Cup Sofia	3rd		7th	1st	4th	2nd
2013	Grand Prix Thiais	1st		1st	1st	1st	1st
2013	Grand Prix Holon	1st		2nd	3rd	8th (Q)	WD
2013	Grand Prix Moscow	1st		1st	1st	1st	3rd
2012	Aeon Cup	4th	2nd				
2012	Italian Serie A		2nd				
2012	World Cup Tashkent	4th		7th	8th	6th	7th
2012	Dundee Precious Cup	1st					
2012	World Cup Penza	6th (OC)					
2012	World Cup Kyiv	7th		12th (Q)	3rd	3rd	3rd
2012	Baltic Hoop	5th (OC)					
2012	Grand Prix Moscow	9th		7th (Q)	5th (Q)	7th (Q)	13th (Q)
2011	World Cup Montreal	3rd		5th	1st	4th	4th
National
Year	Event	AA	Team	Hoop	Ball	Clubs	Ribbon
2016	Russian Championships	2nd	1st	1st	1st	1st	1st
2014	Russian Championships	2nd	1st				
2013	Russian Championships	1st	1st				
2012	Russian Championships	1st	1st				
2011	Russian Championships	1st	1st				
Q = Qualifications (Did not advance to Event Final due to the 2 gymnast per country rule, only Top 8 highest score); WR = World Record; WD = Withdrew; NT = No Team Competition; DNS = Did Not Start

== See also ==
- Nationality changes in gymnastics
