= Daria Svatkovskaya =

Russian rhythmic gymnast

- Full name: Daria Dmitrievna Svatkovskaya
- Nickname: Dasha
- Born: 4 December 1996 (age 29) Moscow, Russia

Gymnastics career
- Discipline: Rhythmic gymnastics
- Country represented: Russia
- Club: Gazprom
- Gym: Sportschool 74
- Head coach: Irina Viner
- Assistant coach: Anna Shumilova
- Former coach: Oksana Skaldina
- Retired: yes
- World ranking: 8 (2013 Season)
Medal record
Representing Russia
Rhythmic Gymnastics
European Championships
| Gold medal – first place | 2013 Vienna | Team |
| Gold medal – first place | 2013 Vienna | Hoop |
Junior European Championships
| Gold medal – first place | 2011 Minsk | 5 Ropes |
| Silver medal – second place | 2011 Minsk | Group All-around |
Grand Prix Final
| Gold medal – first place | 2013 Berlin | Clubs |

Daria Dmitrievna Svatkovskaya (Russian: Дарья Дмитриевна Сватковская; born 4 December 1996 in Moscow) is a retired Russian individual rhythmic gymnast. She is the 2012 Russian National All-around silver medalist. She retired in August 2014, due to a serious back injury.

== Career ==
=== Junior ===
Svatkovskaya had a successful junior career, winning gold in rope and bronze in ball finals at the 2010 Pesaro Junior World Cup as well as gold in all-around and all event finals (rope, hoop, ball and clubs) at the junior Schmiden International. She also won the all-around junior gold medal at the 2010 Aeon Cup in Japan. Svatkovskaya also briefly competed as a member of the Russian group, winning gold in 5 Ropes and silver in Group all-around at the 2011 European Junior Championships held in Minsk, Belarus.

=== Senior ===
In 2012, Svatkovskaya made her senior individual debut at the Moscow Grand Prix and then competed at the International Schmiden tournament. Her breakthrough came at the 2013 Moscow Grand Prix where she won the bronze in all-around, gold in ribbon and silver in hoop final. At the Thiais Grand Prix, she won the silver medal in All-around and hoop final.

Svatkovskaya's first World Cup competition was the 2013 Irina Deleanu Cup in Romania. She won the bronze medal in All-around behind Ukrainian Alina Maksymenko, gold in Clubs and Ribbon, and bronze in the Ball final. She was the all-around bronze medalist at the 2013 Pesaro World Cup. At the 2013 Minsk World Cup, she won silver in All-around ahead of Belarusian Melitina Staniouta, gold in hoop, silver in ball, and bronze in the ribbon final. Svatkovskaya's first senior Europeans were the 2013 European Championships in Vienna, Austria. She won gold in her sole apparatus, hoop, and together with her teammates (Yana Kudryavtseva and Margarita Mamun) won the team gold medal for Russia. An ankle injury kept her out of the 2013 World Cup series held in Saint Petersburg, Russia. Svatkovskaya returned to competition at the 2013 Grand Prix Brno and won the silver in all-around ahead of Melitina Staniouta. In the event finals, she won gold in hoop and clubs, silver in ball and placed eighth in ribbon. At the 2013 Grand Prix Final in Berlin, she placed fourth in the all-around behind Miteva and qualified to two event finals, winning gold in clubs and finishing sixth in ribbon.

In 2014, recovering from injuries; Svatkovskaya sat out from competition in the World Cup and Grand Prix series early in the season. She resumed training in April but will miss out both Russian Nationals and qualifying for a spot in the European Championships. After missing half of the season in competition, In August 2014, Svatkovskaya announced her retirement due her persistent back injury after a series of treatments.

== Personal life ==
Svatkovskaya is the daughter of Oksana Skaldina, the former Rhythmic Gymnastics World Champion and 1992 Olympic bronze medalist. Her father, Dmitri Svatkovsky is the individual 2000 Olympic gold medalist in modern pentathlon. In 2019, she married Russian hockey player Nikita Setdikov. Together they have one daughter Ulyana Nikitichna (born 22 July 2021).

== Competitive highlights ==
| Year | Event | Team | AA | Hoop | Ball | Clubs | Ribb. |
International
| 2010 | Aeon Cup | 1st | 1st J | | | | |

== Routine music information ==
| Year | Apparatus | Music title |
|---|---|---|
| 2013 | Hoop | "My Na Lodochke Katalis (мы на лодочке катались)" by Valentina Tolkunova |
| 2013 | Ball (third) | Nocturne "Razluka" by Mikhail Glinka |
| 2013 | Ball (second) | El tango de Roxanne by Edvin Marton |
| 2013 | Ball (first) | Canaro En Paris by Quinteto Real |
| 2013 | Clubs | ? |
| 2013 | Ribbon (third) | "Calm Before The Storm" by Bijan Mortazavi |
| 2013 | Ribbon (second) | Carnaval De Venise by André Rieu & His Johann Strauss Orchestra-Medley |
| 2013 | Ribbon (first) | Lo Sceicco Bianco by Nino Rota |
| 2012 | Hoop | Danse macabre op.40 by Saint-Saëns |
| 2012 | Ball | ? |
| 2012 | Clubs | Mambo No.5 |
| 2012 | Ribbon | Limelight (Main Theme) by André Rieu |
