= 2010 FIG Rhythmic Gymnastics World Cup series =

International rhythm gymnastics competition

The 2010 FIG World Cup circuit in Rhythmic Gymnastics includes six category A events and two category B events. With stopovers in North America and Europe, the competitions took place on January 30–31 in Montreal (CAN), March 6–7 in Debrecem (HUN), March 11–14 in Portimão (POR), March 26–28 in Kalamata (GRE), April 3–4 in Saint Petersburg (RUS), May 7–9 in Corbeil-Essonnes (FRA), May 21–23 in Minsk (BLR) and August 27–29 in Pesaro (ITA). Two events were open only to individual athletes (Montreal and Corbeil-Essonnes), while six were open to both individual athletes and groups. In all of the events, all-around competitions served as qualifications for the finals by apparatus. The world ranking points collected by the competitors at their best four World Cup events added up to a total, and the top scorers in each event were crowned winners of the overall series at the final event in Pesaro, Italy.

== Formats ==
Date	Level		Location	Ref.
January 30–31	Cat. B	(Canada) Montreal	Individuals	
March 6–7	Cat. A	(Hungary) Debrecen	Individuals & Groups	
March 11–14	Cat. A	(Portugal) Portimão	Individuals & Groups	
March 26–28	Cat. A	(Greece) Kalamata	Individuals & Groups	
April 3–4	Cat. B	(Russia) Saint Petersburg	Individuals & Groups	
May 7–9	Cat. A	(France) Corbeil-Essonnes	Individuals	
May 21–23	Cat. A	(Belarus) Minsk	Individuals & Groups	
August 27–29	Cat. A	(Italy) Pesaro	Individuals & Groups	

== Medal winners ==
=== All-around ===
==== Individual ====
Competitions	Gold	Silver	Bronze
Category A
Debrecen	(Russia) Yevgeniya Kanayeva	(Russia) Daria Kondakova	(Russia) Darya Dmitriyeva
Portimão	(Russia) Yevgeniya Kanayeva	(Russia) Daria Kondakova	(Russia) Darya Dmitriyeva
Kalamata	(Russia) Daria Kondakova	(Bulgaria) Silvia Miteva	(Belarus) Liubov Charkashyna
Corbeil-Essonnes	(Russia) Daria Kondakova	(Bulgaria) Silvia Miteva	(Belarus) Hanna Rabtsava
Minsk	(Russia) Yevgeniya Kanayeva	(Russia) Darya Dmitriyeva	(Belarus) Melitina Staniouta
Pesaro	(Russia) Yevgeniya Kanayeva	(Russia) Daria Kondakova	(Belarus) Melitina Staniouta
Category B
Montreal	(Russia) Yevgeniya Kanayeva	(Russia) Darya Dmitriyeva	(Russia) Daria Kondakova
Saint Petersburg	(Russia) Yevgeniya Kanayeva	(Russia) Darya Dmitriyeva	(Russia) Daria Kondakova

==== Group all-around ====
Competitions	Gold	Silver	Bronze
Category A
Debrecen	Belarus	Russia	Azerbaijan
Portimão	Russia	Italy	Belarus
Kalamata	Italy	Belarus	Azerbaijan
Minsk	Russia	Belarus	Israel
Pesaro	Italy	Belarus	Israel
Category B
Saint Petersburg	Belarus	Germany	Japan

=== Apparatus ===
==== Rope ====
Competitions	Gold	Silver	Bronze
Category A
Debrecen	(Russia) Yevgeniya Kanayeva	(Russia) Daria Kondakova	(Belarus) Melitina Staniouta
Portimão	(Russia) Yevgeniya Kanayeva	(Russia) Daria Kondakova	(Azerbaijan) Aliya Garayeva
Kalamata	(Russia) Daria Kondakova	(Belarus) Melitina Staniouta	(Russia) Yana Lukonina
Corbeil-Essonnes	(Russia) Daria Kondakova	(Ukraine) Alina Maksymenko	(Bulgaria) Silvia Miteva
Minsk	(Russia) Yevgeniya Kanayeva	(Russia) Darya Dmitriyeva	(Belarus) Melitina Staniouta
Pesaro	(Russia) Yevgeniya Kanayeva	(Russia) Daria Kondakova	(Belarus) Melitina Staniouta
Category B
Montreal	(Belarus) Melitina Staniouta	(Russia) Darya Dmitriyeva	(Russia) Yevgeniya Kanayeva
Saint Petersburg	(Russia) Yevgeniya Kanayeva	(Russia) Darya Dmitriyeva	(Belarus) Melitina Staniouta

==== Hoop ====
Competitions	Gold	Silver	Bronze
Category A
Debrecen	(Russia) Yevgeniya Kanayeva	(Russia) Daria Kondakova	(Bulgaria) Silvia Miteva
Portimão	(Russia) Daria Kondakova	(Russia) Darya Dmitriyeva	(Bulgaria) Silvia Miteva
Kalamata	(Belarus) Melitina Staniouta	(Russia) Daria Kondakova	(Belarus) Liubov Charkashyna
Corbeil-Essonnes	(Russia) Daria Kondakova	(Bulgaria) Silvia Miteva	(Kazakhstan) Anna Alyabyeva
Minsk	(Russia) Yevgeniya Kanayeva	(Belarus) Liubov Charkashyna	(Belarus) Melitina Staniouta
Pesaro	(Russia) Yevgeniya Kanayeva	(Russia) Daria Kondakova	(Belarus) Liubov Charkashyna
Category B
Montreal	(Russia) Daria Kondakova	(Russia) Yevgeniya Kanayeva	(Belarus) Melitina Staniouta
Saint Petersburg	(Russia) Yevgeniya Kanayeva	(Russia) Darya Dmitriyeva	(Belarus) Liubov Charkashyna

==== Ball ====
Competitions	Gold	Silver	Bronze
Category A
Debrecen	(Russia) Yevgeniya Kanayeva	(Russia) Darya Dmitriyeva	(Belarus) Liubov Charkashyna
Portimão	(Russia) Yevgeniya Kanayeva	(Azerbaijan) Aliya Garayeva	(Israel) Neta Rivkin
Kalamata	(Bulgaria) Silvia Miteva	(Belarus) Melitina Staniouta	(Russia) Daria Kondakova
Corbeil-Essonnes	(Bulgaria) Silvia Miteva	(Belarus) Hanna Rabtsava	(Azerbaijan) Anna Gurbanova
Minsk	(Russia) Yevgeniya Kanayeva	(Russia) Daria Kondakova	(Belarus) Liubov Charkashyna
Pesaro	(Russia) Yevgeniya Kanayeva	(Belarus) Melitina Staniouta	(Russia) Darya Dmitriyeva
Category B
Montreal	(Russia) Yevgeniya Kanayeva	(Russia) Darya Dmitriyeva	(Belarus) Melitina Staniouta
Saint Petersburg	(Russia) Yevgeniya Kanayeva	(Belarus) Liubov Charkashyna	(Belarus) Melitina Staniouta

==== Ribbon ====
Competitions	Gold	Silver	Bronze
Category A
Debrecen	(Russia) Yevgeniya Kanayeva	(Russia) Daria Kondakova	(Belarus) Melitina Staniouta
Portimão	(Russia) Yevgeniya Kanayeva	(Belarus) Liubov Charkashyna	(Belarus) Melitina Staniouta
Kalamata	(Russia) Daria Kondakova	(Azerbaijan) Aliya Garayeva	(Belarus) Liubov Charkashyna
Corbeil-Essonnes	(Russia) Daria Kondakova	(Russia) Yana Lukonina	(Bulgaria) Silvia Miteva
Minsk	(Russia) Yevgeniya Kanayeva	(Russia) Daria Kondakova	(Azerbaijan) Aliya Garayeva
Pesaro	(Russia) Yevgeniya Kanayeva	(Russia) Daria Kondakova	(Belarus) Melitina Staniouta
Category B
Montreal	(Russia) Yevgeniya Kanayeva	(Russia) Yana Lukonina	(Belarus) Melitina Staniouta
Saint Petersburg	(Russia) Yevgeniya Kanayeva	(Russia) Daria Kondakova	(Belarus) Liubov Charkashyna

==== 5 hoops ====
Competitions	Gold	Silver	Bronze
Category A
Debrecen	Russia	Belarus	Israel
Portimão	Belarus	Italy	Russia
Kalamata	Italy	Belarus	Bulgaria
Minsk	Belarus	Japan	Russia
Pesaro	Italy	Belarus	Bulgaria
Category B
Saint Petersburg	Russia	Germany	Japan

==== 2 ropes and 3 ribbons ====
Competitions	Gold	Silver	Bronze
Category A
Debrecen	Russia	Belarus	Azerbaijan
Portimão	Italy	Russia	Israel
Kalamata	Belarus	Italy	Bulgaria
Minsk	Belarus	Russia	Israel
Pesaro	Italy	Russia	Israel
Category B
Saint Petersburg	Belarus	Germany	Japan

== Overall medal table ==
Rank	Nation	Gold	Silver	Bronze	Total
1	Russia (RUS)	41	31	10	82
2	Belarus (BLR)	9	14	24	47
3	Italy (ITA)	6	3	0	9
4	Bulgaria (BUL)	2	3	7	12
5	Germany (GER)	0	3	0	3
6	Azerbaijan (AZE)	0	2	6	8
7	Japan (JPN)	0	1	3	4
8	Ukraine (UKR)	0	1	0	1
9	Israel (ISR)	0	0	7	7
10	Kazakhstan (KAZ)	0	0	1	1
Totals (10 entries)		58	58	58	174

== See also ==
- 2010 FIG Artistic Gymnastics World Cup series
- 2010 Rhythmic Gymnastics Grand Prix circuit
