= 2011 FIG Rhythmic Gymnastics World Cup series =

International rhythm gymnastics competition

The 2011 FIG World Cup circuit in Rhythmic Gymnastics includes one category A event (Sofia) and nine category B events. With stopovers in North America, Europe and Asia, the competitions took place on January 29–30 in Montreal (CAN), March 25–27 in Pesaro (ITA), April 15–17 in Kalamata (GRE), April 23–24 in Nizhny Novgorod (RUS), April 28 – May 1 in Portimão (POR), May 6–8 in Kyiv (UKR), May 13–15 in Corbeil-Essonnes (FRA), August 20–21 in Sofia (BUL), August 26–27 in Tel-Aviv (ISR) and September 5–7 in Tashkent (UZB). Two events were open to individual athletes (Montreal and Corbeil-Essonnes), two were open to groups (Nizhny Novgorod and Tel-Aviv) and six were open to both individual athletes and groups. In all of the events, all-around competitions served as qualifications for the finals by apparatus. The world ranking points collected by the competitors at their best four World Cup events added up to a total, and the top scorers in each event were crowned winners of the overall series at the final event in Tashkent, Uzbekistan.

== Formats ==
Date	Level	Location	Type	Ref.
29–30 January 2011	Cat. B	(Canada) Montreal	Individuals	
25–27 March 2011	Cat. B	(Italy) Pesaro	Individuals and groups	
15–17 April 2011	Cat. B	(Greece) Kalamata	Individuals and groups	
23–24 April 2011	Cat. B	(Russia) Nizhny Novgorod	Groups	
28 April – 1 May 2011	Cat. B	(Portugal) Portimão	Individuals and groups	
6–8 May 2011	Cat. B	(Ukraine) Kyiv	Individuals and groups	
13–15 May 2011	Cat. B	(France) Corbeil-Essonnes	Individuals	
20–21 August 2011	Cat. A	(Bulgaria) Sofia	Individuals and groups	
26–27 August 2011	Cat. B	(Israel) Tel-Aviv	Groups	
5–7 September 2011	Cat. B	(Uzbekistan) Tashkent	Individuals and groups	

== Medal winners ==
=== All-around ===
==== Individual ====
Competitions	Gold	Silver	Bronze
Category A
Sofia	(Russia) Daria Kondakova	(Bulgaria) Silvia Miteva	(France) Delphine Ledoux
Category B
Montreal	(Belarus) Liubov Charkashyna	(Belarus) Aliaksandra Narkevich	(Russia) Margarita Mamun
Pesaro	(Russia) Yevgeniya Kanayeva	(Russia) Darya Dmitriyeva	(Belarus) Liubov Charkashyna
Kalamata	(Russia) Darya Dmitriyeva	(Russia) Daria Kondakova	(Belarus) Liubov Charkashyna
Portimão	(Russia) Daria Kondakova	(Russia) Yevgeniya Kanayeva	(Russia) Darya Dmitriyeva
Kyiv	(Russia) Daria Kondakova	(Ukraine) Alina Maksymenko	(Russia) Yana Lukonina
Corbeil-Essonnes	(Russia) Yevgeniya Kanayeva	(Russia) Darya Dmitriyeva	(Belarus) Liubov Charkashyna
Tashkent	(Russia) Darya Dmitriyeva	(Russia) Alexandra Merkulova	(Belarus) Liubov Charkashyna

==== Group all-around ====
Competitions	Gold	Silver	Bronze
Category A
Sofia	Russia	Bulgaria	Belarus
Category B
Pesaro	Russia	Italy	Belarus
Kalamata	Bulgaria	Belarus	Israel
Nizhny Novgorod	Russia	Israel	Germany
Portimão	Russia	Italy	Belarus
Kyiv	Italy	Belarus	Ukraine
Tel-Aviv	Russia	Israel	Belarus
Tashkent	Japan	Germany	Azerbaijan

=== Apparatus ===
==== Hoop ====
Competitions	Gold	Silver	Bronze
Category A
Sofia	(Russia) Daria Kondakova	(Bulgaria) Silvia Miteva	(Belarus) Melitina Staniouta
Category B
Montreal	(Russia) Yana Lukonina	(Belarus) Aliaksandra Narkevich	(Belarus) Liubov Charkashyna
Pesaro	(Russia) Yevgeniya Kanayeva	(Belarus) Liubov Charkashyna	(Azerbaijan) Aliya Garayeva
Kalamata	(Belarus) Liubov Charkashyna	(Russia) Darya Dmitriyeva	(Russia) Daria Kondakova
Portimão	(Russia) Yevgeniya Kanayeva	(Russia) Daria Kondakova	(Azerbaijan) Aliya Garayeva
Kyiv	(Ukraine) Alina Maksymenko	(Russia) Daria Kondakova	(Bulgaria) Silvia Miteva
Corbeil-Essonnes	(Russia) Yevgeniya Kanayeva	(Azerbaijan) Aliya Garayeva	(France) Delphine Ledoux
Tashkent	(Russia) Darya Dmitriyeva	(Russia) Alexandra Merkulova	(Belarus) Liubov Charkashyna

==== Ball ====
Competitions	Gold	Silver	Bronze
Category A
Sofia	(Russia) Daria Kondakova	(Bulgaria) Silvia Miteva	(Belarus) Melitina Staniouta
Category B
Montreal	(Russia) Margarita Mamun	(Belarus) Liubov Charkashyna	(Kazakhstan) Anna Alyabyeva
Pesaro	(Russia) Yevgeniya Kanayeva	(Belarus) Liubov Charkashyna	(Azerbaijan) Aliya Garayeva
Kalamata	(Russia) Daria Kondakova	(Russia) Darya Dmitriyeva	(Uzbekistan) Ulyana Trofimova
Portimão	(Russia) Yevgeniya Kanayeva	(Russia) Daria Kondakova	(Belarus) Melitina Staniouta
Kyiv	(Russia) Daria Kondakova	(Bulgaria) Silvia Miteva	(Uzbekistan) Ulyana Trofimova
Corbeil-Essonnes	(Russia) Yevgeniya Kanayeva	(Azerbaijan) Aliya Garayeva	(Belarus) Melitina Staniouta
Tashkent	(Russia) Darya Dmitriyeva	(Russia) Alexandra Merkulova	(Belarus) Liubov Charkashyna

==== Clubs ====
Competitions	Gold	Silver	Bronze
Category A
Sofia	(Russia) Daria Kondakova	(Bulgaria) Silvia Miteva	(Russia) Alexandra Merkulova
Category B
Montreal	(Belarus) Aliaksandra Narkevich	(Belarus) Liubov Charkashyna	(Russia) Yana Lukonina
Pesaro	(Belarus) Liubov Charkashyna	(Russia) Daria Kondakova	(Bulgaria) Silvia Miteva
Kalamata	(Bulgaria) Silvia Miteva	(Russia) Daria Kondakova	(Russia) Darya Dmitriyeva
Portimão	(Russia) Daria Kondakova	(Russia) Darya Dmitriyeva	(Bulgaria) Silvia Miteva
Kyiv	(Ukraine) Alina Maksymenko	(Russia) Daria Kondakova	(Belarus) Hanna Rabtsava
Corbeil-Essonnes	(Russia) Yevgeniya Kanayeva	(Russia) Darya Dmitriyeva	(Belarus) Liubov Charkashyna
Tashkent	(Russia) Alexandra Merkulova	(Russia) Darya Dmitriyeva	(Belarus) Melitina Staniouta

==== Ribbon ====
Competitions	Gold	Silver	Bronze
Category A
Sofia	(Russia) Daria Kondakova	(Bulgaria) Silvia Miteva	(France) Delphine Ledoux
Category B
Montreal	(Belarus) Aliaksandra Narkevich	(Belarus) Liubov Charkashyna	(Russia) Yana Lukonina
Pesaro	(Russia) Darya Dmitriyeva	(Russia) Yevgeniya Kanayeva	(Belarus) Liubov Charkashyna
Kalamata	(Russia) Daria Kondakova	(Bulgaria) Silvia Miteva	(Belarus) Liubov Charkashyna
Portimão	(Russia) Daria Kondakova	(Russia) Darya Dmitriyeva	(Belarus) Liubov Charkashyna
Kyiv	(Ukraine) Alina Maksymenko	(Russia) Daria Kondakova	(Bulgaria) Silvia Miteva
Corbeil-Essonnes	(Russia) Yevgeniya Kanayeva	(Russia) Darya Dmitriyeva	(France) Delphine Ledoux
Tashkent	(Russia) Darya Dmitriyeva	(Russia) Alexandra Merkulova	(Uzbekistan) Ulyana Trofimova

==== 5 balls ====
Competitions	Gold	Silver	Bronze
Category A
Sofia	Russia	Belarus	Bulgaria
Category B
Pesaro	Italy	Belarus	Israel
Kalamata	Israel	Bulgaria	France
Nizhny Novgorod	Russia	Israel	Japan
Portimão	Russia	Israel	Italy
Kyiv	Belarus	Italy	Ukraine
Tel-Aviv	Russia	Belarus	Israel
Tashkent	Japan	Germany	Kazakhstan

==== 2 hoops and 3 ribbons ====
Competitions	Gold	Silver	Bronze
Category A
Sofia	Bulgaria	Italy	Belarus
Category B
Pesaro	Belarus	Russia	Italy
Kalamata	Bulgaria	Israel	Russia
Nizhny Novgorod	Russia	Israel	Germany
Portimão	Russia	Italy	Belarus
Kyiv	Italy	Ukraine	Belarus
Tel-Aviv	Russia	Belarus	Israel
Tashkent	Japan	Azerbaijan	Germany

== Overall medal table ==
Rank	Nation	Gold	Silver	Bronze	Total
1	Russia (RUS)	43	24	9	76
2	Belarus (BLR)	7	13	24	44
3	Bulgaria (BUL)	4	9	5	18
4	Italy (ITA)	3	5	2	10
5	Ukraine (UKR)	3	2	2	7
6	Japan (JPN)	3	0	1	4
7	Israel (ISR)	1	6	4	11
8	Azerbaijan (AZE)	0	3	4	7
9	Germany (GER)	0	2	3	5
10	France (FRA)	0	0	5	5
11	Uzbekistan (UZB)	0	0	3	3
12	Kazakhstan (KAZ)	0	0	2	2
Totals (12 entries)		64	64	64	192

== See also ==
- 2011 FIG Artistic Gymnastics World Cup series
- 2011 Rhythmic Gymnastics Grand Prix circuit
