= 2012 FIG Rhythmic Gymnastics World Cup series =

International rhythm gymnastics competition

The 2012 FIG World Cup circuit in Rhythmic Gymnastics includes one category A event (Sofia) and six category B events. Apart from Corbeil-Essonnes (individuals only), all events include both, individual and group competitions, with all-around competitions serving as qualifications for the finals by apparatus.

With stopovers in Europe and Asia, the competitions took place March 16–18 in Kyiv (UKR), April 13–15 in Pesaro (ITA), April 28–29 in Penza (RUS), May 5–6 in Sofia (BUL), May 11–13 in Corbeil-Essonnes (FRA), May 18–20 in Tashkent (UZB) and July 13–15 in Minsk (BLR).

The world ranking points collected by the competitors at their best four World Cup events were added up to a total for each gymnast, and the top scorers in each event were crowned winners of the overall series at the final event in Minsk, Belarus.

== Formats ==
Date	Level	Location	Type	Ref.
16–18 March 2012	Cat. B	(Ukraine) Kyiv	Individuals and groups	
13–15 April 2012	Cat. B	(Italy) Pesaro	Individuals and groups	
28–29 April 2012	Cat. B	(Russia) Penza	Individuals and groups	
5–6 May 2012	Cat. A	(Bulgaria) Sofia	Individuals and groups	
11–13 May 2012	Cat. B	(France) Corbeil-Essonnes	Individuals	
18–20 May 2012	Cat. B	(Uzbekistan) Tashkent	Individuals and groups	
13–15 July 2012	Cat. B	(Belarus) Minsk	Individuals and groups	

== Medal winners ==
=== All-around ===
==== Individual ====
Competitions	Gold	Silver	Bronze
Category A
Sofia	(Russia) Yevgeniya Kanayeva	(Russia) Daria Kondakova	(Bulgaria) Silvia Miteva
Category B
Kyiv	(Russia) Darya Dmitriyeva	(Ukraine) Alina Maksymenko	(Ukraine) Ganna Rizatdinova
Pesaro	(Russia) Yevgeniya Kanayeva	(Russia) Daria Kondakova	(Russia) Darya Dmitriyeva
Penza	(Russia) Daria Kondakova	(Russia) Darya Dmitriyeva	(Azerbaijan) Aliya Garayeva
Corbeil-Essonnes	(Russia) Yevgeniya Kanayeva	(Russia) Alexandra Merkulova	(Russia) Darya Dmitriyeva
Tashkent	(Russia) Alexandra Merkulova	(Israel) Neta Rivkin	(Kazakhstan) Anna Alyabyeva
Minsk	(Russia) Yevgeniya Kanayeva	(Russia) Darya Dmitriyeva	(Belarus) Liubov Charkashyna

==== Group all-around ====
Competitions	Gold	Silver	Bronze
Category A
Sofia	Bulgaria	Italy	Spain
Category B
Kyiv	Italy	Belarus	Bulgaria
Kyiv	Italy	Belarus	Ukraine
Pesaro	Russia	Italy	Belarus
Penza	Russia	Japan	Poland
Tashkent	Belarus	Russia	Israel
Minsk	Russia	Belarus	Spain

=== Apparatus ===
==== Hoop ====
Competitions	Gold	Silver	Bronze
Category A
Sofia	(Russia) Daria Kondakova	(Bulgaria) Silvia Miteva	(Russia) Darya Dmitriyeva
Category B
Kyiv	(Russia) Darya Dmitriyeva	(Ukraine) Alina Maksymenko	None awarded
Kyiv	(Russia) Darya Dmitriyeva	(Ukraine) Ganna Rizatdinova	None awarded
Pesaro	(Russia) Yevgeniya Kanayeva	(Russia) Darya Dmitriyeva	(Belarus) Liubov Charkashyna
Penza	(Azerbaijan) Aliya Garayeva	(Russia) Darya Dmitriyeva	(South Korea) Son Yeon-jae
Corbeil-Essonnes	(Russia) Yevgeniya Kanayeva	(Belarus) Liubov Charkashyna	(Russia) Darya Dmitriyeva
Tashkent	(Russia) Alexandra Merkulova	(Belarus) Liubov Charkashyna	(Kazakhstan) Anna Alyabyeva
Minsk	(Russia) Yevgeniya Kanayeva	(Russia) Darya Dmitriyeva	(Belarus) Melitina Staniouta

==== Ball ====
Competitions	Gold	Silver	Bronze
Category A
Sofia	(Russia) Yevgeniya Kanayeva	(Russia) Daria Kondakova	(Ukraine) Ganna Rizatdinova
Category B
Kyiv	(Ukraine) Alina Maksymenko	(Ukraine) Ganna Rizatdinova	(Russia) Margarita Mamun
Pesaro	(Russia) Yevgeniya Kanayeva	(Russia) Darya Dmitriyeva	(Ukraine) Ganna Rizatdinova
Penza	(Russia) Daria Kondakova	(Kazakhstan) Anna Alyabyeva	(Russia) Darya Dmitriyeva
Corbeil-Essonnes	(Russia) Yevgeniya Kanayeva	(Belarus) Liubov Charkashyna	(Azerbaijan) Aliya Garayeva
Tashkent	(Russia) Alexandra Merkulova	(Azerbaijan) Aliya Garayeva	(Belarus) Liubov Charkashyna
Minsk	(Russia) Yevgeniya Kanayeva	(Russia) Darya Dmitriyeva	(Belarus) Liubov Charkashyna

==== Clubs ====
Competitions	Gold	Silver	Bronze
Category A
Sofia	(Russia) Yevgeniya Kanayeva	(Bulgaria) Silvia Miteva	(Ukraine) Ganna Rizatdinova
Category B
Kyiv	(Russia) Darya Dmitriyeva	(Ukraine) Ganna Rizatdinova	(Russia) Margarita Mamun
Pesaro	(Russia) Yevgeniya Kanayeva	(Russia) Daria Kondakova	(Azerbaijan) Aliya Garayeva
Penza	(Russia) Darya Dmitriyeva	(Russia) Daria Kondakova	(Uzbekistan) Ulyana Trofimova
Corbeil-Essonnes	(Russia) Alexandra Merkulova	(Russia) Yevgeniya Kanayeva	(Belarus) Liubov Charkashyna
Tashkent	(Russia) Alexandra Merkulova	(Azerbaijan) Aliya Garayeva	(Israel) Neta Rivkin
Minsk	(Russia) Yevgeniya Kanayeva	(Russia) Alexandra Merkulova	(Belarus) Melitina Staniouta

==== Ribbon ====
Competitions	Gold	Silver	Bronze
Category A
Sofia	(Russia) Yevgeniya Kanayeva	(Russia) Darya Dmitriyeva	(Ukraine) Ganna Rizatdinova
Category B
Kyiv	(Russia) Darya Dmitriyeva	(Bulgaria) Silvia Miteva	(Russia) Margarita Mamun
Pesaro	(Russia) Daria Kondakova	(Belarus) Liubov Charkashyna	(Bulgaria) Silvia Miteva
Penza	(Russia) Darya Dmitriyeva	(Russia) Daria Kondakova	(Azerbaijan) Aliya Garayeva
Corbeil-Essonnes	(Russia) Alexandra Merkulova	(Russia) Darya Dmitriyeva	(Belarus) Liubov Charkashyna
Tashkent	(Belarus) Liubov Charkashyna	(Kazakhstan) Anna Alyabyeva	(Israel) Neta Rivkin
Minsk	(Russia) Yevgeniya Kanayeva	(Russia) Darya Dmitriyeva	(Belarus) Melitina Staniouta

==== 5 balls ====
Competitions	Gold	Silver	Bronze
Category A
Sofia	Bulgaria	Italy	Belarus
Category B
Kyiv	Belarus	Bulgaria	Italy
Kyiv	Belarus	Bulgaria	Ukraine
Pesaro	Russia	Belarus	Italy
Penza	Russia	Japan	Poland
Tashkent	Russia	Belarus	Israel
Minsk	Russia	Belarus	Italy

==== 2 hoops and 3 ribbons ====
Competitions	Gold	Silver	Bronze
Category A
Sofia	Spain	Italy	Belarus
Category B
Kyiv	Belarus	Ukraine	Italy
Pesaro	Italy	Belarus	Israel
Penza	Russia	Japan	Poland
Tashkent	Russia	Belarus	Israel
Minsk	Russia	Belarus	Italy

== Overall medal table ==
Rank	Nation	Gold	Silver	Bronze	Total
1	Russia (RUS)	42	20	8	70
2	Belarus (BLR)	4	12	12	28
3	Italy (ITA)	2	4	4	10
4	Bulgaria (BUL)	2	4	3	9
5	Ukraine (UKR)	1	6	7	14
6	Azerbaijan (AZE)	1	2	4	7
7	Spain (ESP)	1	0	2	3
8	Japan (JPN)	0	3	0	3
9	Kazakhstan (KAZ)	0	2	2	4
10	Israel (ISR)	0	1	6	7
11	Poland (POL)	0	0	3	3
12	South Korea (KOR)	0	0	1	1
12	Uzbekistan (UZB)	0	0	1	1
Totals (13 entries)		53	54	53	160

== See also ==
- 2012 FIG Artistic Gymnastics World Cup series
- 2012 Rhythmic Gymnastics Grand Prix circuit
