= List of medalists at the Rhythmic Gymnastics Grand Prix circuit (2004–2013) =

Medalists at the Rhythmic Gymnastics Grand Prix circuit (2004–2013)

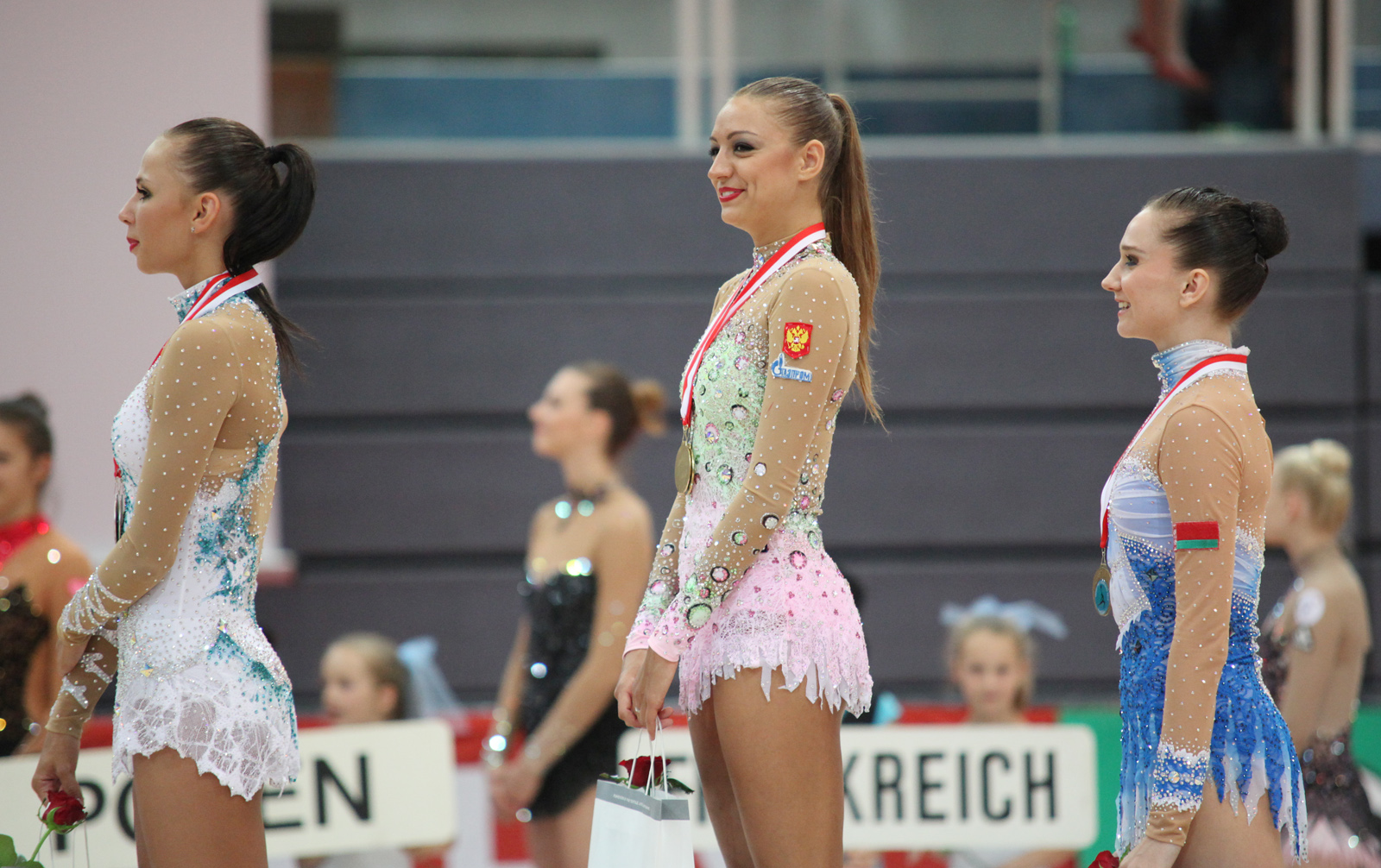
Evgeniya Kanaeva, Darya Dmitriyeva and Liubov Charkashyna at the 2012 Vorarlberg Grand Prix

This is a list of medalists in senior individual events at every stage of the Rhythmic Gymnastics Grand Prix circuit from 2004 to 2013. The circuit has been established in 1994 and earning medals in the different stages of the circuit is considered a prestigious achievement in the sport of rhythmic gymnastics. The list includes senior medalists in the regular stages of the circuit, as well as the Grand Prix Final. Group events, either at official Grand Prix competitions or international tournaments held alongside Grand Prix stages, are not covered in this article.

== 2004 ==
=== Events ===
Date	Event	Location	Ref.
February 28–29	Gazprom Grand Prix	(Russia) Moscow	
March 12–13	Kyiv Grand Prix	(Ukraine) Kyiv	
March 27–29	Thiais Grand Prix	(France) Thiais	
April 29–30	Minsk Grand Prix	(Belarus) Minsk	
June 17–19	Holon Grand Prix	(Israel) Holon	
October 15–16	Grand Prix Berlin Masters	(Germany) Berlin	
October 29–30	Grand Prix Final: Alfred Vogel Cup	(Netherlands) Deventer	

=== Medalists ===
==== Individual all-around ====
Competitions	Gold	Silver	Bronze
Moscow	(Russia) Irina Tchachina	(Kazakhstan) Aliya Yussupova	(Russia) Olga Kapranova
Kyiv	(Ukraine) Anna Bessonova	(Ukraine) Natalia Godunko	(Russia) Vera Sessina
Thiais	(Russia) Irina Tchachina	(Ukraine) Anna Bessonova	(Kazakhstan) Aliya Yussupova
Minsk	(Belarus) Inna Zhukova	(Russia) Alina Kabaeva	(Ukraine) Anna Bessonova
Holon	(Russia) Alina Kabaeva	(Ukraine) Anna Bessonova	(Belarus) Inna Zhukova
Berlin	(Ukraine) Anna Bessonova	(Russia) Olga Kapranova	(Belarus) Inna Zhukova
Deventer	(Ukraine) Natalia Godunko	(Russia) Olga Kapranova	(Ukraine) Anna Bessonova

==== Hoop ====
Competitions	Gold	Silver	Bronze
Moscow	(Russia) Irina Tchachina	(Russia) Olga Kapranova	(Kazakhstan) Aliya Yussupova
Kyiv	(Ukraine) Anna Bessonova	(Ukraine) Natalia Godunko	(Belarus) Inna Zhukova
Thiais	(Russia) Irina Tchachina	(Belarus) Inna Zhukova	(Ukraine) Anna Bessonova
Minsk	(Russia) Alina Kabaeva	(Ukraine) Anna Bessonova	(Belarus) Inna Zhukova
Holon	(Russia) Alina Kabaeva	(Ukraine) Anna Bessonova	(Belarus) Svetlana Rudalova
Berlin	(Ukraine) Anna Bessonova	(Belarus) Inna Zhukova	(Ukraine) Natalia Godunko
Deventer	(Ukraine) Anna Bessonova	(Ukraine) Natalia Godunko	(Russia) Olga Kapranova

==== Ball ====
Competitions	Gold	Silver	Bronze
Moscow	(Belarus) Inna Zhukova	(Russia) Irina Tchachina	(Kazakhstan) Aliya Yussupova
Kyiv	(Ukraine) Anna Bessonova	(Russia) Vera Sessina	(Belarus) Inna Zhukova
Thiais	(Russia) Irina Tchachina	(Russia) Alina Kabaeva	(Ukraine) Anna Bessonova
Minsk	(Russia) Alina Kabaeva	(Ukraine) Anna Bessonova	(Belarus) Inna Zhukova
Holon	(Russia) Olga Kapranova	(Russia) Alina Kabaeva	(Belarus) Inna Zhukova
Berlin	(Russia) Vera Sessina	(Ukraine) Anna Bessonova	(Belarus) Inna Zhukova
Deventer	(Ukraine) Natalia Godunko	(Belarus) Inna Zhukova	(Ukraine) Anna Bessonova

==== Clubs ====
Competitions	Gold	Silver	Bronze
Moscow	(Russia) Irina Tchachina	(Russia) Vera Sessina	(Belarus) Inna Zhukova
Kyiv	(Ukraine) Anna Bessonova	(Ukraine) Natalia Godunko	(Russia) Vera Sessina
Thiais	(Russia) Alina Kabaeva	(Russia) Irina Tchachina	(Ukraine) Anna Bessonova
Minsk	(Ukraine) Anna Bessonova	(Russia) Alina Kabaeva	(Belarus) Inna Zhukova
Holon	(Russia) Alina Kabaeva	(Russia) Vera Sessina	(Belarus) Inna Zhukova
Berlin	(Russia) Olga Kapranova	(Ukraine) Anna Bessonova	(Russia) Vera Sessina
Deventer	(Ukraine) Anna Bessonova	(Ukraine) Natalia Godunko	(Belarus) Inna Zhukova

==== Ribbon ====
Competitions	Gold	Silver	Bronze
Moscow	(Russia) Irina Tchachina	(Russia) Vera Sessina	(Ukraine) Natalia Godunko
Kyiv	(Ukraine) Anna Bessonova	(Ukraine) Natalia Godunko	(Russia) Vera Sessina
Thiais	(Russia) Alina Kabaeva	(Russia) Irina Tchachina	(Ukraine) Anna Bessonova
Minsk	(Russia) Alina Kabaeva	(Belarus) Inna Zhukova	(Ukraine) Natalia Godunko
Holon	(Russia) Alina Kabaeva	(Russia) Vera Sessina	(Belarus) Inna Zhukova
Berlin	(Russia) Olga Kapranova	(Russia) Vera Sessina	(Ukraine) Natalia Godunko
Deventer	(Ukraine) Natalia Godunko	(Ukraine) Anna Bessonova	(Russia) Olga Kapranova

== 2005 ==
=== Events ===
Date	Event	Location	Ref.
March 5–6	Gazprom Grand Prix	(Russia) Moscow	
March 12–13	Kyiv Grand Prix	(Ukraine) Kyiv	
March 26–28	Thiais Grand Prix	(France) Thiais	
April 23–24	Minsk Grand Prix	(Belarus) Minsk	
May 19–21	Holon Grand Prix	(Israel) Holon	
May 30–31	Bourgas Grand Prix	(Bulgaria) Bourgas	
September 2–3	Deventer Grand Prix	(Netherlands) Deventer	
September 16–17	Grand Prix Final: Berlin Masters	(Germany) Berlin	

=== Medalists ===
==== Individual all-around ====
Competitions	Gold	Silver	Bronze
Moscow	(Russia) Irina Tchachina	(Russia) Olga Kapranova	(Russia) Vera Sessina
Kyiv	(Ukraine) Natalia Godunko	(Ukraine) Anna Bessonova	(Russia) Vera Sessina
Thiais	(Russia) Irina Tchachina	(Russia) Olga Kapranova	(Ukraine) Natalia Godunko
Minsk	(Ukraine) Anna Bessonova	(Belarus) Inna Zhukova	(Russia) Vera Sessina
Holon	(Russia) Olga Kapranova	(Russia) Vera Sessina	(Kazakhstan) Aliya Yussupova
Bourgas	(Ukraine) Anna Bessonova	(Bulgaria) Simona Peycheva	(Belarus) Inna Zhukova
Deventer	(Russia) Olga Kapranova	(Russia) Vera Sessina	(Ukraine) Anna Bessonova
Berlin	(Russia) Vera Sessina	(Russia) Olga Kapranova	(Ukraine) Natalia Godunko

==== Rope ====
Competitions	Gold	Silver	Bronze
Moscow	(Russia) Irina Tchachina	(Russia) Vera Sessina	(Ukraine) Anna Bessonova
Kyiv	(Ukraine) Anna Bessonova	(Ukraine) Natalia Godunko	(Russia) Vera Sessina
Thiais	(Russia) Irina Tchachina	(Russia) Vera Sessina	(Ukraine) Anna Bessonova
Minsk	(Russia) Olga Kapranova	(Belarus) Inna Zhukova	(Russia) Vera Sessina
Holon	(Russia) Olga Kapranova	(Russia) Vera Sessina	(Belarus) Inna Zhukova
Bourgas	(Ukraine) Anna Bessonova	(Ukraine) Natalia Godunko	(Bulgaria) Simona Peycheva
Deventer	(Russia) Olga Kapranova	(Ukraine) Anna Bessonova	(Russia) Vera Sessina
Berlin	(Russia) Olga Kapranova	(Russia) Irina Tchachina	(Ukraine) Natalia Godunko

==== Ball ====
Competitions	Gold	Silver	Bronze
Moscow	(Russia) Irina Tchachina	(Russia) Olga Kapranova	(Azerbaijan) Dinara Gimatova
Kyiv	(Ukraine) Anna Bessonova	(Ukraine) Natalia Godunko	(Russia) Vera Sessina
Thiais	(Russia) Irina Tchachina	(Russia) Olga Kapranova	(Belarus) Inna Zhukova
Minsk	(Russia) Olga Kapranova	(Ukraine) Anna Bessonova	(Ukraine) Natalia Godunko
Holon	(Belarus) Inna Zhukova	(Russia) Olga Kapranova	(Russia) Vera Sessina
Bourgas	(Bulgaria) Simona Peycheva	(Belarus) Inna Zhukova	(Ukraine) Anna Bessonova
Deventer	(Russia) Olga Kapranova	(Ukraine) Anna Bessonova	(Russia) Vera Sessina
Berlin	(Russia) Olga Kapranova	(Russia) Vera Sessina	(Belarus) Inna Zhukova

==== Clubs ====
Competitions	Gold	Silver	Bronze
Moscow	(Russia) Olga Kapranova	(Russia) Vera Sessina	(Ukraine) Anna Bessonova
Kyiv	(Russia) Vera Sessina	(Ukraine) Anna Bessonova	(Russia) Olga Kapranova
Thiais	(Russia) Irina Tchachina	(Russia) Vera Sessina	(Ukraine) Natalia Godunko
Minsk	(Belarus) Inna Zhukova	(Kazakhstan) Aliya Yussupova	(Ukraine) Anna Bessonova
Holon	(Russia) Olga Kapranova	(Ukraine) Anna Bessonova	(Russia) Vera Sessina
Bourgas	(Ukraine) Anna Bessonova	(Ukraine) Natalia Godunko	(Bulgaria) Elizabeth Paisieva
Deventer	(Ukraine) Natalia Godunko	(Russia) Vera Sessina	(Ukraine) Anna Bessonova
Berlin	(Russia) Olga Kapranova	(Russia) Vera Sessina	(Belarus) Inna Zhukova

==== Ribbon ====
Competitions	Gold	Silver	Bronze
Moscow	(Russia) Irina Tchachina	(Ukraine) Natalia Godunko	(Azerbaijan) Dinara Gimatova
Kyiv	(Ukraine) Natalia Godunko	(Ukraine) Anna Bessonova	(Russia) Vera Sessina
Thiais	(Ukraine) Natalia Godunko	(Russia) Irina Tchachina	(Ukraine) Anna Bessonova
Minsk	(Russia) Olga Kapranova	(Russia) Vera Sessina	(Ukraine) Anna Bessonova
Holon	(Russia) Olga Kapranova	(Ukraine) Natalia Godunko	(Ukraine) Anna Bessonova
Bourgas	(Bulgaria) Simona Peycheva	(Ukraine) Natalia Godunko	(Ukraine) Anna Bessonova
Deventer	(Ukraine) Natalia Godunko	(Russia) Olga Kapranova	(Russia) Vera Sessina
Berlin	(Ukraine) Natalia Godunko	(Russia) Vera Sessina	(Ukraine) Anna Bessonova

== 2006 ==
=== Events ===
Date	Event	Location	Ref.
March 3–4	Gazprom Grand Prix	(Russia) Moscow	
March 16–17	Kyiv Grand Prix	(Ukraine) Kyiv	
March 24–25	Thiais Grand Prix	(France) Thiais	
May 4–5	Bourgas Grand Prix	(Bulgaria) Bourgas	
May 19–20	Minsk Grand Prix	(Belarus) Minsk	
May 26–27	Brno Grand Prix	(Czech Republic) Brno	
June 8–10	Holon Grand Prix	(Israel) Holon	
September 2–3	Deventer Grand Prix	(Netherlands) Deventer	
October 20–21	Grand Prix Final: Berlin Masters	(Germany) Berlin	

=== Medalists ===
==== Individual all-around ====
Competitions	Gold	Silver	Bronze
Moscow	(Russia) Alina Kabaeva	(Russia) Vera Sessina	(Russia) Olga Kapranova
Kyiv	(Ukraine) Natalia Godunko	(Ukraine) Anna Bessonova	(Belarus) Inna Zhukova
Thiais	(Russia) Vera Sessina	(Russia) Alina Kabaeva	(Russia) Olga Kapranova
Bourgas	(Russia) Vera Sessina	(Russia) Olga Kapranova	(Bulgaria) Simona Peycheva
Minsk	(Russia) Olga Kapranova	(Belarus) Inna Zhukova	(Russia) Vera Sessina
Brno	(Russia) Vera Sessina	(Russia) Olga Kapranova	(Ukraine) Anna Bessonova
Holon	(Russia) Alina Kabaeva	(Russia) Vera Sessina	(Belarus) Inna Zhukova
Deventer	(Russia) Alina Kabaeva	(Russia) Olga Kapranova	(Russia) Vera Sessina
Berlin	(Russia) Vera Sessina	(Russia) Olga Kapranova	(Belarus) Inna Zhukova

==== Rope ====
Competitions	Gold	Silver	Bronze
Moscow	(Russia) Alina Kabaeva	(Belarus) Inna Zhukova	(Kazakhstan) Aliya Yussupova
Kyiv	(Ukraine) Natalia Godunko	(Russia) Olga Kapranova	(Ukraine) Anna Bessonova
Thiais	(Russia) Vera Sessina	(Belarus) Inna Zhukova	(Russia) Olga Kapranova
Bourgas	(Russia) Vera Sessina	(Russia) Olga Kapranova	(Ukraine) Anna Bessonova
Minsk	(Belarus) Inna Zhukova	(Russia) Olga Kapranova	(Ukraine) Anna Bessonova
Brno	(Russia) Alina Kabaeva	(Russia) Vera Sessina	(Ukraine) Natalia Godunko
Holon	(Ukraine) Anna Bessonova	(Russia) Vera Sessina	(Ukraine) Natalia Godunko
Deventer	(Russia) Alina Kabaeva	(Belarus) Inna Zhukova	(Russia) Olga Kapranova
Berlin	(Russia) Vera Sessina	(Belarus) Inna Zhukova	(Russia) Olga Kapranova

==== Ball ====
Competitions	Gold	Silver	Bronze
Moscow	(Russia) Vera Sessina	(Belarus) Inna Zhukova	(Russia) Olga Kapranova
Kyiv	(Ukraine) Anna Bessonova	(Russia) Olga Kapranova	(Belarus) Inna Zhukova
Thiais	(Russia) Vera Sessina	(Russia) Alina Kabaeva	(Kazakhstan) Aliya Yussupova
Bourgas	(Belarus) Inna Zhukova	(Russia) Olga Kapranova	(Ukraine) Anna Bessonova
Minsk	(Russia) Olga Kapranova	(Belarus) Inna Zhukova	(Ukraine) Anna Bessonova
Brno	(Russia) Vera Sessina	(Belarus) Inna Zhukova	(Kazakhstan) Aliya Yussupova
Holon	(Belarus) Inna Zhukova	(Russia) Vera Sessina	(Russia) Alina Kabaeva
Deventer	(Belarus) Inna Zhukova	(Russia) Olga Kapranova	(Ukraine) Natalia Godunko
Berlin	(Russia) Vera Sessina	(Ukraine) Anna Bessonova	(Ukraine) Natalia Godunko

==== Clubs ====
Competitions	Gold	Silver	Bronze
Moscow	(Russia) Vera Sessina	(Russia) Alina Kabaeva	(Belarus) Inna Zhukova
Kyiv	(Russia) Olga Kapranova	(Ukraine) Anna Bessonova	(Ukraine) Natalia Godunko
Thiais	(Russia) Vera Sessina	(Russia) Olga Kapranova	(Ukraine) Natalia Godunko
Bourgas	(Russia) Vera Sessina	(Russia) Olga Kapranova	(Ukraine) Anna Bessonova
Minsk	(Russia) Olga Kapranova	(Ukraine) Natalia Godunko	(Ukraine) Anna Bessonova
Brno	(Russia) Vera Sessina	(Belarus) Inna Zhukova	(Ukraine) Anna Bessonova
Holon	(Russia) Alina Kabaeva	(Russia) Olga Kapranova	(Ukraine) Anna Bessonova
Deventer	(Russia) Alina Kabaeva	(Russia) Vera Sessina	(Belarus) Inna Zhukova
Berlin	(Russia) Vera Sessina	(Belarus) Inna Zhukova	(Ukraine) Natalia Godunko

==== Ribbon ====
Competitions	Gold	Silver	Bronze
Moscow	(Russia) Alina Kabaeva	(Russia) Vera Sessina	(Ukraine) Natalia Godunko
Kyiv	(Ukraine) Natalia Godunko	(Russia) Olga Kapranova	(Ukraine) Anna Bessonova
Thiais	(Russia) Olga Kapranova	(Russia) Vera Sessina	(Ukraine) Natalia Godunko
Bourgas	(Russia) Vera Sessina	(Russia) Olga Kapranova	(Bulgaria) Simona Peycheva
Minsk	(Russia) Vera Sessina	(Belarus) Inna Zhukova	(Russia) Olga Kapranova
Brno	(Russia) Vera Sessina	(Belarus) Inna Zhukova	(Ukraine) Natalia Godunko
Holon	(Russia) Vera Sessina	(Russia) Alina Kabaeva	(Israel) Irina Risenzon
Deventer	(Russia) Vera Sessina	(Belarus) Inna Zhukova	(Ukraine) Natalia Godunko
Berlin	(Russia) Vera Sessina	(Belarus) Inna Zhukova	(Ukraine) Natalia Godunko

== 2007 ==
=== Events ===
Date	Event	Location	Ref.
March 2–3	Gazprom Grand Prix	(Russia) Moscow	
March 23–25	Thiais Grand Prix	(France) Thiais	
April 20–21	Marbella Grand Prix	(Spain) Marbella	
May 4–5	Bourgas Grand Prix	(Bulgaria) Bourgas	
May 17–18	Minsk Grand Prix	(Belarus) Minsk	
May 25–26	Brno Grand Prix	(Czech Republic) Brno	
June 7–9	Holon Grand Prix	(Israel) Holon	
August 31–September 2	Deventer Grand Prix	(Netherlands) Deventer	
October 13–14	Grand Prix Berlin Masters	(Germany) Berlin	
November 16–17	Grand Prix Final: Grand Prix Innsbruck	(Austria) Innsbruck	

=== Medalists ===
==== Individual all-around ====
Competitions	Gold	Silver	Bronze
Moscow	(Russia) Alina Kabaeva	(Russia) Vera Sessina	(Russia) Olga Kapranova
Thiais	(Russia) Vera Sessina	(Ukraine) Anna Bessonova	(Russia) Alina Kabaeva
Marbella	(Russia) Alina Kabaeva	(Ukraine) Anna Bessonova	(Russia) Vera Sessina
Bourgas	(Russia) Vera Sessina	(Russia) Olga Kapranova	(Bulgaria) Simona Peycheva
Minsk	(Russia) Vera Sessina	(Russia) Olga Kapranova	(Belarus) Inna Zhukova
Brno	(Russia) Vera Sessina	(Russia) Alina Kabaeva	(Russia) Olga Kapranova
Holon	(Russia) Alina Kabaeva	(Russia) Olga Kapranova	(Ukraine) Anna Bessonova
Deventer	(Russia) Vera Sessina	(Russia) Alina Kabaeva	(Russia) Olga Kapranova
Berlin	(Russia) Olga Kapranova	(Russia) Vera Sessina	(Azerbaijan) Aliya Garayeva
Innsbruck	(Russia) Olga Kapranova	(Russia) Vera Sessina	(Azerbaijan) Aliya Garayeva

==== Rope ====
Competitions	Gold	Silver	Bronze
Moscow	(Russia) Alina Kabaeva	(Russia) Vera Sessina	(Azerbaijan) Aliya Garayeva
Thiais	(Russia) Alina Kabaeva	(Ukraine) Anna Bessonova	(Russia) Vera Sessina
Marbella	(Russia) Alina Kabaeva	(Ukraine) Anna Bessonova	(Russia) Vera Sessina
Bourgas	(Russia) Vera Sessina	(Russia) Olga Kapranova	(Bulgaria) Simona Peycheva
Minsk	(Russia) Vera Sessina	(Russia) Olga Kapranova	(Belarus) Inna Zhukova
Brno	(Russia) Olga Kapranova	(Russia) Alina Kabaeva	(Israel) Irina Risenzon
Holon	(Russia) Alina Kabaeva	(Russia) Vera Sessina	(Ukraine) Anna Bessonova
Deventer	(Russia) Vera Sessina	(Azerbaijan) Aliya Garayeva	(Russia) Olga Kapranova
Berlin	(Russia) Olga Kapranova	(Russia) Vera Sessina	(Azerbaijan) Aliya Garayeva
Innsbruck	(Russia) Vera Sessina	(Russia) Olga Kapranova	(Israel) Irina Risenzon

==== Hoop ====
Competitions	Gold	Silver	Bronze
Moscow	(Russia) Alina Kabaeva	(Russia) Olga Kapranova	(Kazakhstan) Aliya Yussupova
Thiais	(Russia) Vera Sessina	(Ukraine) Anna Bessonova	(Russia) Olga Kapranova
Marbella	(Russia) Alina Kabaeva	(Russia) Olga Kapranova	(Belarus) Inna Zhukova
Bourgas	(Russia) Vera Sessina	(Bulgaria) Simona Peycheva	(Russia) Olga Kapranova
Minsk	(Russia) Olga Kapranova	(Russia) Vera Sessina	(Ukraine) Anna Bessonova
Brno	(Russia) Olga Kapranova	(Belarus) Inna Zhukova	(Russia) Vera Sessina
Holon	(Ukraine) Anna Bessonova	(Russia) Vera Sessina	(Russia) Olga Kapranova
Deventer	(Russia) Vera Sessina	(Russia) Olga Kapranova	(Kazakhstan) Aliya Yussupova
Berlin	(Russia) Olga Kapranova	(Russia) Vera Sessina	(Israel) Irina Risenzon
Innsbruck	(Russia) Olga Kapranova	(Russia) Vera Sessina	(Israel) Irina Risenzon

==== Clubs ====
Competitions	Gold	Silver	Bronze
Moscow	(Russia) Alina Kabaeva	(Russia) Olga Kapranova	(Kazakhstan) Aliya Yussupova
Thiais	(Russia) Alina Kabaeva	(Ukraine) Anna Bessonova	(Azerbaijan) Aliya Garayeva
Marbella	(Russia) Alina Kabaeva	(Russia) Olga Kapranova	(Belarus) Inna Zhukova
Bourgas	(Russia) Vera Sessina	(Russia) Olga Kapranova	(Bulgaria) Simona Peycheva
Minsk	(Ukraine) Anna Bessonova	(Belarus) Inna Zhukova	(Russia) Vera Sessina
Brno	(Russia) Alina Kabaeva	(Russia) Vera Sessina	(Belarus) Inna Zhukova
Holon	(Russia) Alina Kabaeva	(Russia) Olga Kapranova	(Ukraine) Anna Bessonova
Deventer	(Russia) Vera Sessina	(Russia) Olga Kapranova	(Belarus) Inna Zhukova
Berlin	(Russia) Olga Kapranova	(Russia) Vera Sessina	(Kazakhstan) Aliya Yussupova
Innsbruck	(Russia) Olga Kapranova	(Russia) Vera Sessina	(Azerbaijan) Aliya Garayeva

==== Ribbon ====
Competitions	Gold	Silver	Bronze
Moscow	(Russia) Alina Kabaeva	(Russia) Olga Kapranova	(Azerbaijan) Aliya Garayeva
Thiais	(Ukraine) Anna Bessonova	(Russia) Olga Kapranova	(Kazakhstan) Aliya Yussupova
Marbella	(Russia) Vera Sessina	(Ukraine) Anna Bessonova	(Russia) Alina Kabaeva
Bourgas	(Russia) Vera Sessina	(Bulgaria) Simona Peycheva	(Azerbaijan) Dinara Gimatova
Minsk	(Russia) Olga Kapranova	(Belarus) Inna Zhukova	(Ukraine) Anna Bessonova
Brno	(Russia) Alina Kabaeva	(Belarus) Inna Zhukova	(Israel) Irina Risenzon
Holon	(Russia) Vera Sessina	(Ukraine) Anna Bessonova	(Azerbaijan) Aliya Garayeva
Deventer	(Russia) Vera Sessina	(Azerbaijan) Aliya Garayeva	(Belarus) Inna Zhukova
Berlin	(Russia) Vera Sessina	(Russia) Olga Kapranova	(Ukraine) Natalia Godunko
Innsbruck	(Russia) Vera Sessina	(Russia) Olga Kapranova	(Belarus) Liubov Charkashyna

== 2008 ==
=== Events ===
Date	Event	Location	Ref
February 28–29	Gazprom Grand Prix	(Russia) Moscow	
March 28–30	Thiais Grand Prix	(France) Thiais	
April 5–6	Brno Grand Prix	(Czech Republic) Brno	
April 25–26	Marbella Grand Prix	(Spain) Marbella	
May 2–3	Bourgas Grand Prix	(Bulgaria) Bourgas	
April 23–25	Holon Grand Prix	(Israel) Holon	
October 11–12	Grand Prix Berlin Masters	(Germany) Berlin	
November 7–8	Grand Prix Final: Grand Prix Slovakia	(Slovakia) Bratislava	

=== Medalists ===
==== Individual all-around ====
Competitions	Gold	Silver	Bronze
Moscow	(Russia) Vera Sessina	(Russia) Olga Kapranova	(Russia) Evgenia Kanaeva
Thiais	(Russia) Evgenia Kanaeva	(Belarus) Inna Zhukova	(Kazakhstan) Aliya Yussupova
Brno	(Russia) Olga Kapranova	(Azerbaijan) Aliya Garayeva	(Russia) Marina Shpekht
Marbella	(Russia) Evgenia Kanaeva	(Russia) Vera Sessina	(Ukraine) Anna Bessonova
Bourgas	(Belarus) Inna Zhukova	(Bulgaria) Simona Peycheva	(Israel) Irina Risenzon
Holon	(Russia) Vera Sessina	(Russia) Marina Shpekht	(Kazakhstan) Aliya Yussupova
Berlin	(Russia) Vera Sessina	(Kazakhstan) Aliya Yussupova	(Israel) Irina Risenzon
Bratislava	(Russia) Olga Kapranova	(Russia) Vera Sessina	(Israel) Irina Risenzon

==== Rope ====
Competitions	Gold	Silver	Bronze
Moscow	(Russia) Olga Kapranova	(Russia) Evgenia Kanaeva	(Belarus) Inna Zhukova
Thiais	(Russia) Evgenia Kanaeva	(Belarus) Inna Zhukova	(Israel) Irina Risenzon
Brno	(Russia) Olga Kapranova	(Russia) Marina Shpekht	(Israel) Irina Risenzon
Marbella	(Russia) Evgenia Kanaeva	(Russia) Vera Sessina	(Ukraine) Natalia Godunko
Bourgas	(Belarus) Inna Zhukova	(Israel) Irina Risenzon	(Bulgaria) Simona Peycheva
Holon	(Russia) Vera Sessina	(Russia) Marina Shpekht	(Israel) Irina Risenzon
Berlin	(Russia) Vera Sessina	(Kazakhstan) Aliya Yussupova	(Russia) Marina Shpekht
Bratislava	(Russia) Olga Kapranova	(Russia) Vera Sessina	(Israel) Irina Risenzon

==== Hoop ====
Competitions	Gold	Silver	Bronze
Moscow	(Russia) Olga Kapranova	(Azerbaijan) Aliya Garayeva	(Belarus) Inna Zhukova
Thiais	(Russia) Evgenia Kanaeva	(Kazakhstan) Aliya Yussupova	(Belarus) Inna Zhukova
Brno	(Russia) Olga Kapranova	(Russia) Marina Shpekht	(Azerbaijan) Aliya Garayeva
Marbella	(Belarus) Inna Zhukova	(Russia) Vera Sessina	(Kazakhstan) Aliya Yussupova
Bourgas	(Belarus) Inna Zhukova	(Bulgaria) Simona Peycheva	(Bulgaria) Elizabeth Paisieva
Holon	(Russia) Vera Sessina	(Kazakhstan) Aliya Yussupova	(Israel) Irina Risenzon
Berlin	(Russia) Vera Sessina	(Kazakhstan) Aliya Yussupova	(Russia) Marina Shpekht
Bratislava	(Russia) Vera Sessina	(Russia) Olga Kapranova	(Poland) Joanna Mitrosz

==== Clubs ====
Competitions	Gold	Silver	Bronze
Moscow	(Kazakhstan) Aliya Yussupova	(Russia) Evgenia Kanaeva	(Russia) Vera Sessina
Thiais	(Russia) Evgenia Kanaeva	(Russia) Marina Shpekht	(Belarus) Inna Zhukova
Brno	(Russia) Olga Kapranova	(Russia) Marina Shpekht	(Belarus) Liubov Charkashyna
Marbella	(Ukraine) Anna Bessonova	(Russia) Vera Sessina	(Russia) Evgenia Kanaeva
Bourgas	(Belarus) Inna Zhukova	(Israel) Irina Risenzon	(Bulgaria) Elizabeth Paisieva
Holon	(Russia) Vera Sessina	(Belarus) Liubov Charkashyna	(Russia) Marina Shpekht
Berlin	(Kazakhstan) Aliya Yussupova	(Israel) Irina Risenzon	(Russia) Marina Shpekht
Bratislava	(Russia) Olga Kapranova	(Russia) Vera Sessina	(Israel) Irina Risenzon

==== Ribbon ====
Competitions	Gold	Silver	Bronze
Moscow	(Russia) Vera Sessina	(Russia) Olga Kapranova	(Belarus) Inna Zhukova
Thiais	(Russia) Evgenia Kanaeva	(Belarus) Inna Zhukova	(Russia) Marina Shpekht
Brno	(Russia) Marina Shpekht	(Israel) Irina Risenzon	(Russia) Olga Kapranova
Marbella	(Russia) Evgenia Kanaeva	(Ukraine) Anna Bessonova	(Russia) Vera Sessina
Bourgas	(Belarus) Inna Zhukova	(Bulgaria) Simona Peycheva	(Azerbaijan) Dinara Gimatova
Holon	(Russia) Vera Sessina	(Israel) Irina Risenzon	(Kazakhstan) Aliya Yussupova
Berlin	(Russia) Vera Sessina	(Israel) Irina Risenzon	(Kazakhstan) Aliya Yussupova
Bratislava	(Russia) Olga Kapranova	(Russia) Vera Sessina	(Israel) Irina Risenzon

== 2009 ==
=== Events ===
Date	Event	Location	Ref.
February 26–27	Gazprom Grand Prix	(Russia) Moscow	
March 13–14	Brno Grand Prix	(Czech Republic) Brno	
March 26–28	Thiais Grand Prix	(France) Thiais	
April 9–10	Grand Prix Kyiv	(Ukraine) Kyiv	
April 23–25	Holon Grand Prix	(Israel) Holon	
May 1–2	Bourgas Grand Prix	(Bulgaria) Bourgas	
May 28–29	Marbella Grand Prix	(Spain) Marbella	
November 27–28	Grand Prix Final: Berlin Masters	(Germany) Berlin	

=== Medalists ===
==== Individual all-around ====
Competitions	Gold	Silver	Bronze
Moscow	(Russia) Evgenia Kanaeva	(Russia) Vera Sessina	(Russia) Olga Kapranova
Brno	(Russia) Evgenia Kanaeva	(Russia) Vera Sessina	(Russia) Daria Kondakova
Thiais	(Russia) Evgenia Kanaeva	(Russia) Vera Sessina	(Russia) Olga Kapranova
Kyiv	(Ukraine) Anna Bessonova	(Russia) Daria Kondakova	(Israel) Irina Risenzon
Holon	(Russia) Evgenia Kanaeva	(Russia) Daria Kondakova	(Israel) Irina Risenzon
Bourgas	(Russia) Daria Kondakova	(Bulgaria) Silvia Miteva	(Israel) Irina Risenzon
Marbella	(Russia) Evgenia Kanaeva	(Russia) Daria Kondakova	(Kazakhstan) Aliya Yussupova
Berlin	(Russia) Evgenia Kanaeva	(Russia) Daria Kondakova	(Belarus) Melitina Staniouta

==== Rope ====
Competitions	Gold	Silver	Bronze
Moscow	(Russia) Evgenia Kanaeva	(Russia) Vera Sessina	(Belarus) Melitina Staniouta
Brno	(Russia) Vera Sessina	(Russia) Evgenia Kanaeva	(Belarus) Melitina Staniouta
Thiais	(Russia) Evgenia Kanaeva	(Russia) Vera Sessina	(Israel) Irina Risenzon
Kyiv	(Ukraine) Anna Bessonova	(Russia) Daria Kondakova	(Ukraine) Alina Maksymenko
Holon	(Russia) Evgenia Kanaeva	(Russia) Daria Kondakova	(Israel) Irina Risenzon
Bourgas	(Russia) Daria Kondakova	(Bulgaria) Silvia Miteva	(Israel) Neta Rivkin
Marbella	(Russia) Evgenia Kanaeva	(Russia) Daria Kondakova	(Belarus) Melitina Staniouta
Berlin	(Russia) Evgenia Kanaeva	(Russia) Daria Kondakova	(Belarus) Melitina Staniouta

==== Hoop ====
Competitions	Gold	Silver	Bronze
Moscow	(Russia) Evgenia Kanaeva	(Russia) Vera Sessina	(Kazakhstan) Aliya Yussupova
Brno	(Russia) Evgenia Kanaeva	(Russia) Vera Sessina	(Ukraine) Alina Maksymenko
Thiais	(Russia) Evgenia Kanaeva	(Russia) Olga Kapranova	(Belarus) Liubov Charkashyna
Kyiv	(Ukraine) Anna Bessonova	(Russia) Daria Kondakova	(Ukraine) Alina Maksymenko
Holon	(Russia) Evgenia Kanaeva	(Russia) Daria Kondakova	(Israel) Irina Risenzon
Bourgas	(Russia) Daria Kondakova	(Israel) Irina Risenzon	(Austria) Caroline Weber
Marbella	(Russia) Evgenia Kanaeva	(Russia) Daria Kondakova	(Kazakhstan) Aliya Yussupova
Berlin	(Russia) Evgenia Kanaeva	(Belarus) Melitina Staniouta	(Israel) Irina Risenzon

==== Ball ====
Competitions	Gold	Silver	Bronze
Moscow	(Russia) Evgenia Kanaeva	(Belarus) Melitina Staniouta	(Israel) Irina Risenzon
Brno	(Russia) Evgenia Kanaeva	(Russia) Vera Sessina	(Belarus) Melitina Staniouta
Thiais	(Russia) Evgenia Kanaeva	(Russia) Vera Sessina	(Azerbaijan) Aliya Garayeva
Kyiv	(Russia) Daria Kondakova	(Bulgaria) Silvia Miteva	(Belarus) Svetlana Rudalova
Holon	(Russia) Evgenia Kanaeva	(Russia) Daria Kondakova	(Kazakhstan) Aliya Yussupova
Bourgas	(Russia) Daria Kondakova	(Bulgaria) Silvia Miteva	(Israel) Irina Risenzon
Marbella	(Russia) Evgenia Kanaeva	(Russia) Daria Kondakova	(Kazakhstan) Aliya Yussupova
Berlin	(Russia) Evgenia Kanaeva	(Russia) Daria Kondakova	(Israel) Irina Risenzon

==== Ribbon ====
Competitions	Gold	Silver	Bronze
Moscow	(Russia) Evgenia Kanaeva	(Russia) Vera Sessina	(Belarus) Melitina Staniouta
Brno	(Russia) Evgenia Kanaeva	(Russia) Vera Sessina	(Belarus) Melitina Staniouta
Thiais	(Russia) Vera Sessina	(Russia) Evgenia Kanaeva	(Bulgaria) Silvia Miteva
Kyiv	(Ukraine) Anna Bessonova	(Russia) Daria Kondakova	(Ukraine) Alina Maksymenko
Holon	(Russia) Evgenia Kanaeva	(Israel) Irina Risenzon	(Russia) Daria Kondakova
Bourgas	(Russia) Daria Kondakova	(Bulgaria) Silvia Miteva	(Israel) Irina Risenzon
Marbella	(Russia) Evgenia Kanaeva	(Russia) Daria Kondakova	(Israel) Irina Risenzon
Berlin	(Russia) Evgenia Kanaeva	(Belarus) Melitina Staniouta	(Russia) Daria Kondakova

== 2010 ==
=== Events ===
Date	Event	Location	Ref.
February 18–20	Gazprom Grand Prix	(Russia) Moscow	
March 18–19	Grand Prix Kyiv	(Ukraine) Kyiv	
March 25–27	Thiais Grand Prix	(France) Thiais	
May 14–15	Marbella Grand Prix	(Spain) Marbella	
June 11–12	Grand Prix Innsbruck	(Austria) Innsbruck	
September 2–4	Holon Grand Prix	(Israel) Holon	
October 14–15	Brno Grand Prix	(Czech Republic) Brno	
October 28–29	Grand Prix Final: Berlin Masters	(Germany) Berlin	

=== Medalists ===
==== Individual all-around ====
Competitions	Gold	Silver	Bronze
Moscow	(Russia) Evgenia Kanaeva	(Russia) Daria Kondakova	(Belarus) Melitina Staniouta
Kyiv	(Russia) Daria Dmitrieva	(Ukraine) Alina Maksymenko	(Ukraine) Hanna Rizatdinova
Thiais	(Russia) Evgenia Kanaeva	(Russia) Daria Dmitrieva	(Israel) Irina Risenzon
Marbella	(Russia) Evgenia Kanaeva	(Russia) Daria Kondakova	(Russia) Daria Dmitrieva
Innsbruck	(Russia) Evgenia Kanaeva	(Russia) Daria Kondakova	(Russia) Daria Dmitrieva
Holon	(Russia) Evgenia Kanaeva	(Russia) Daria Dmitrieva	(Russia) Daria Kondakova
Brno	(Russia) Evgenia Kanaeva	(Russia) Daria Kondakova	(Russia) Daria Dmitrieva
Berlin	(Russia) Evgenia Kanaeva	(Russia) Daria Kondakova	(Russia) Daria Dmitrieva

==== Rope ====
Competitions	Gold	Silver	Bronze
Moscow	(Russia) Daria Kondakova	(Russia) Evgenia Kanaeva	(Belarus) Melitina Staniouta
Kyiv	(Ukraine) Alina Maksymenko	(Ukraine) Hanna Rizatdinova	(Russia) Daria Dmitrieva
Thiais	(Russia) Evgenia Kanaeva	(Russia) Daria Dmitrieva	(Ukraine) Alina Maksymenko
Marbella	(Russia) Evgenia Kanaeva	(Russia) Daria Kondakova	(Ukraine) Alina Maksymenko
Innsbruck	(Russia) Evgenia Kanaeva	(Belarus) Melitina Staniouta	(Azerbaijan) Aliya Garayeva
Holon	(Russia) Evgenia Kanaeva	(Russia) Daria Dmitrieva	(Belarus) Melitina Staniouta
Brno	(Russia) Evgenia Kanaeva	(Russia) Daria Kondakova	(Azerbaijan) Aliya Garayeva
Berlin	(Russia) Evgenia Kanaeva	(Russia) Daria Kondakova	(Belarus) Liubov Charkashyna

==== Hoop ====
Competitions	Gold	Silver	Bronze
Moscow	(Russia) Evgenia Kanaeva	(Belarus) Melitina Staniouta	(Azerbaijan) Aliya Garayeva
Kyiv	(Russia) Daria Dmitrieva	(Belarus) Aliaksandra Narkevich	(Israel) Neta Rivkin
Thiais	(Russia) Evgenia Kanaeva	(Russia) Daria Dmitrieva	(Israel) Neta Rivkin
Marbella	(Russia) Evgenia Kanaeva	(Kazakhstan) Anna Alyabyeva	(Russia) Daria Dmitrieva
Innsbruck	(Russia) Evgenia Kanaeva	(Russia) Daria Kondakova	(Azerbaijan) Aliya Garayeva
Holon	(Russia) Evgenia Kanaeva	(Russia) Daria Dmitrieva	(Belarus) Melitina Staniouta
Brno	(Russia) Evgenia Kanaeva	(Russia) Daria Kondakova	(Azerbaijan) Aliya Garayeva
Berlin	(Russia) Evgenia Kanaeva	(Belarus) Liubov Charkashyna	(Kazakhstan) Anna Alyabyeva

==== Ball ====
Competitions	Gold	Silver	Bronze
Moscow	(Russia) Evgenia Kanaeva	(Russia) Daria Kondakova	(Belarus) Melitina Staniouta
Kyiv	(Russia) Daria Dmitrieva	(Ukraine) Alina Maksymenko	(Belarus) Aliaksandra Narkevich
Thiais	(Russia) Evgenia Kanaeva	(Russia) Daria Dmitrieva	(Ukraine) Alina Maksymenko
Marbella	(Russia) Evgenia Kanaeva	(Russia) Daria Kondakova	(Belarus) Liubov Charkashyna
Innsbruck	(Russia) Daria Kondakova	(Russia) Daria Dmitrieva	(Belarus) Liubov Charkashyna
Holon	(Russia) Evgenia Kanaeva	(Russia) Daria Dmitrieva	(Belarus) Melitina Staniouta
Brno	(Russia) Evgenia Kanaeva	(Russia) Daria Dmitrieva	(Uzbekistan) Ulyana Trofimova
Berlin	(Russia) Evgenia Kanaeva	(Russia) Daria Dmitrieva	(Azerbaijan) Aliya Garayeva

==== Ribbon ====
Competitions	Gold	Silver	Bronze
Moscow	(Russia) Daria Kondakova	(Russia) Evgenia Kanaeva	(Azerbaijan) Aliya Garayeva
Kyiv	(Ukraine) Alina Maksymenko	(Russia) Daria Dmitrieva	(Belarus) Aliaksandra Narkevich
Thiais	(Russia) Evgenia Kanaeva	(Russia) Daria Dmitrieva	(Belarus) Hanna Rabtsava
Marbella	(Russia) Evgenia Kanaeva	(Russia) Daria Kondakova	(Azerbaijan) Aliya Garayeva
Innsbruck	(Russia) Evgenia Kanaeva	(Azerbaijan) Aliya Garayeva	(Belarus) Melitina Staniouta
Holon	(Russia) Evgenia Kanaeva	(Russia) Daria Dmitrieva	(Israel) Irina Risenzon
Brno	(Russia) Daria Dmitrieva	(Russia) Daria Kondakova	(Azerbaijan) Aliya Garayeva
Berlin	(Russia) Evgenia Kanaeva	(Russia) Daria Kondakova	(Belarus) Liubov Charkashyna

== 2011 ==
=== Events ===
Date	Event	Location	Ref.
February 25–26	Gazprom Grand Prix	(Russia) Moscow	
March 4–5	Holon Grand Prix	(Israel) Holon	
April 8–10	Thiais Grand Prix	(France) Thiais	
August 27–28	Grand Prix Berlin Masters	(Germany) Berlin	
October 14–15	Grand Prix Final: Brno Grand Prix	(Czech Republic) Brno	

=== Medalists ===
==== Individual all-around ====
Competitions	Gold	Silver	Bronze
Moscow	(Russia) Evgeniya Kanaeva	(Russia) Daria Kondakova	(Russia) Yana Lukonina
Holon	(Russia) Evgeniya Kanaeva	(Russia) Darya Dmitriyeva	(Azerbaijan) Aliya Garayeva
Thiais	(Russia) Evgeniya Kanaeva	(Russia) Yana Lukonina	(Belarus) Liubov Charkashyna
Berlin	(Russia) Evgeniya Kanaeva	(Russia) Darya Dmitriyeva	(Russia) Daria Kondakova
Brno	(Russia) Evgeniya Kanaeva	(Russia) Darya Dmitriyeva	(Azerbaijan) Aliya Garayeva

==== Hoop ====
Competitions	Gold	Silver	Bronze
Moscow	(Russia) Evgeniya Kanaeva	(Kazakhstan) Anna Alyabyeva	(Azerbaijan) Aliya Garayeva
Holon	(Russia) Evgeniya Kanaeva	(Russia) Daria Kondakova	(Azerbaijan) Aliya Garayeva
Thiais	(Russia) Evgeniya Kanaeva	(Russia) Yana Lukonina	(Belarus) Liubov Charkashyna
Berlin	(Russia) Evgeniya Kanaeva	(Russia) Darya Dmitriyeva	(Azerbaijan) Aliya Garayeva
Brno	(Russia) Evgeniya Kanaeva	(Russia) Darya Dmitriyeva	(Azerbaijan) Aliya Garayeva

==== Ball ====
Competitions	Gold	Silver	Bronze
Moscow	(Russia) Evgeniya Kanaeva	(Russia) Alexandra Merkulova	(Israel) Neta Rivkin
Holon	(Russia) Daria Kondakova	(Russia) Darya Dmitriyeva	(Azerbaijan) Aliya Garayeva
Thiais	(Russia) Evgeniya Kanaeva	(Russia) Yana Lukonina	(Azerbaijan) Aliya Garayeva
Berlin	(Russia) Evgeniya Kanaeva	(Russia) Darya Dmitriyeva	(Azerbaijan) Aliya Garayeva
Brno	(Russia) Evgeniya Kanaeva	(Russia) Darya Dmitriyeva	(Azerbaijan) Aliya Garayeva

==== Clubs ====
Competitions	Gold	Silver	Bronze
Moscow	(Russia) Evgeniya Kanaeva	(Russia) Daria Kondakova	(Belarus) Hanna Rabtsava
Holon	(Russia) Evgeniya Kanaeva	(Kazakhstan) Anna Alyabyeva	(Israel) Neta Rivkin
Thiais	(Russia) Evgeniya Kanaeva	(Belarus) Liubov Charkashyna	(Israel) Neta Rivkin
Berlin	(Russia) Evgeniya Kanaeva	(Russia) Daria Kondakova	(Bulgaria) Silvia Miteva
Brno	(Russia) Evgeniya Kanaeva	(Russia) Darya Dmitriyeva	(Azerbaijan) Aliya Garayeva

==== Ribbon ====
Competitions	Gold	Silver	Bronze
Moscow	(Russia) Evgeniya Kanaeva	(Russia) Alexandra Merkulova	(Uzbekistan) Ulyana Trofimova
Holon	(Russia) Evgeniya Kanaeva	(Russia) Darya Dmitriyeva	(Uzbekistan) Ulyana Trofimova
Thiais	(Russia) Evgeniya Kanaeva	(Russia) Alexandra Merkulova	(Belarus) Liubov Charkashyna
Berlin	(Russia) Evgeniya Kanaeva	(Russia) Daria Kondakova	(Bulgaria) Silvia Miteva
Brno	(Russia) Evgeniya Kanaeva	(Russia) Darya Dmitriyeva	(Azerbaijan) Aliya Garayeva

== 2012 ==
=== Events ===
Date	Event	Location	Ref.
February 23–25	Gazprom Grand Prix	(Russia) Moscow	
~~March 23–24~~	~~Holon Grand Prix~~; Canceled	~~(Israel) Holon~~	
March 30–April 1	Thiais Grand Prix	(France) Thiais	
~~June 14–17~~	~~Bucharest Grand Prix~~; Canceled	~~(Romania) Bucharest~~	
June 30–July 1	Vorarlberg Grand Prix	(Austria) Vorarlberg	
~~October 5–7~~	~~Marbella Grand Prix~~; Canceled	~~(Spain) Marbella~~	
October 19–20	Grand Prix Berlin Masters	(Germany) Berlin	
November 2–3	Grand Prix Final: Brno Grand Prix	(Czech Republic) Brno	

=== Medalists ===
==== Individual all-around ====
Competitions	Gold	Silver	Bronze
Moscow	(Russia) Daria Kondakova	(Russia) Evgeniya Kanaeva	(Russia) Darya Dmitriyeva
Thiais	(Russia) Evgeniya Kanaeva	(Russia) Darya Dmitriyeva	(Russia) Alexandra Merkulova
Vorarlberg	(Russia) Evgeniya Kanaeva	(Russia) Darya Dmitriyeva	(Russia) Alexandra Merkulova
Berlin	(Russia) Darya Dmitriyeva	(Germany) Laura Jung	(Israel) Victoria Filanovsky
Brno	(Russia) Daria Dmitrieva	(Belarus) Arina Charopa	(Czech Republic) Monika Míčková

==== Hoop ====
Competitions	Gold	Silver	Bronze
Moscow	(Russia) Evgeniya Kanaeva	(Russia) Darya Dmitriyeva	(South Korea) Son Yeon-jae
Thiais	(Russia) Darya Dmitriyeva	(Belarus) Liubov Charkashyna	(Russia) Evgeniya Kanaeva
Vorarlberg	(Russia) Evgeniya Kanaeva	(Russia) Alexandra Merkulova	(Azerbaijan) Aliya Garayeva
Berlin	(Russia) Darya Dmitriyeva	(Germany) Laura Jung	(Poland) Anna Czarniecka
Brno	(Russia) Daria Dmitrieva	(Belarus) Arina Charopa	(Israel) Shir Hillel

==== Ball ====
Competitions	Gold	Silver	Bronze
Moscow	(Russia) Darya Dmitriyeva	(Azerbaijan) Aliya Garayeva	(Russia) Daria Kondakova
Thiais	(Russia) Evgeniya Kanaeva	(Russia) Alexandra Merkulova	(Israel) Neta Rivkin
Vorarlberg	(Russia) Evgeniya Kanaeva	(Russia) Darya Dmitriyeva	(Azerbaijan) Aliya Garayeva
Berlin	(Russia) Darya Dmitriyeva	(Israel) Victoria Filanovsky	(Germany) Laura Jung
Brno	(Russia) Daria Dmitrieva	(Czech Republic) Monika Míčková	(Austria) Nicol Ruprecht

==== Clubs ====
Competitions	Gold	Silver	Bronze
Moscow	(Russia) Evgeniya Kanaeva	(Russia) Daria Kondakova	(Israel) Neta Rivkin
Thiais	(Russia) Evgeniya Kanaeva	(Russia) Darya Dmitriyeva	(Belarus) Liubov Charkashyna
Vorarlberg	(Russia) Evgeniya Kanaeva	(Russia) Darya Dmitriyeva	(Belarus) Liubov Charkashyna
Berlin	(Russia) Darya Dmitriyeva	(Azerbaijan) Lala Yusifova	(Germany) Laura Jung
Brno	(Russia) Daria Dmitrieva	(Azerbaijan) Lala Yusifova	(Austria) Nicol Ruprecht

==== Ribbon ====
Competitions	Gold	Silver	Bronze
Moscow	(Russia) Evgeniya Kanaeva	(Russia) Daria Kondakova	(Bulgaria) Silvia Miteva
Thiais	(Russia) Evgeniya Kanaeva	(Azerbaijan) Aliya Garayeva	(Russia) Darya Dmitriyeva
Vorarlberg	(Russia) Darya Dmitriyeva	(Russia) Evgeniya Kanaeva	(Azerbaijan) Aliya Garayeva
Berlin	(Russia) Darya Dmitriyeva	(Germany) Laura Jung	(Azerbaijan) Lala Yusifova
Brno	(Russia) Daria Dmitrieva	(Azerbaijan) Lala Yusifova	(Czech Republic) Monika Míčková

== 2013 ==
=== Events ===
Date	Event	Location	Ref.
March 1–3	Gazprom Grand Prix	(Russia) Moscow	
March 8–9	Holon Grand Prix	(Israel) Holon	
March 28–April 1	27th Thiais Grand Prix	(France) Thiais	
October 4–5	Brno Grand Prix	(Czech Republic) Brno	
October 19–20	Grand Prix Final: Berlin Masters	(Germany) Berlin	

=== Medalists ===
==== Individual all-around ====
Competitions	Gold	Silver	Bronze
Moscow	(Russia) Margarita Mamun	(Bulgaria) Silvia Miteva	(Russia) Daria Svatkovskaya
Holon	(Russia) Margarita Mamun	(Bulgaria) Silvia Miteva	(Israel) Victoria Filanovsky
Thiais	(Russia) Margarita Mamun	(Russia) Daria Svatkovskaya	(Russia) Alexandra Merkulova
Brno	(Russia) Margarita Mamun	(Russia) Daria Svatkovskaya	(Belarus) Melitina Staniouta
Berlin	(Russia) Margarita Mamun	(Russia) Maria Titova	(Bulgaria) Sylvia Miteva

==== Hoop ====
Competitions	Gold	Silver	Bronze
Moscow	(Russia) Margarita Mamun	(Russia) Daria Svatkovskaya	(Bulgaria) Silvia Miteva
Holon	(Belarus) Melitina Staniouta	(Bulgaria) Silvia Miteva	(Russia) Margarita Mamun
Thiais	(Russia) Margarita Mamun	(Russia) Daria Svatkovskaya	(Belarus) Melitina Staniouta
Brno	(Russia) Daria Svatkovskaya	(Russia) Margarita Mamun	(Belarus) Melitina Staniouta
Berlin	(Russia) Margarita Mamun	(Russia) Maria Titova	(Bulgaria) Sylvia Miteva

==== Ball ====
Competitions	Gold	Silver	Bronze
Moscow	(Russia) Margarita Mamun	(Russia) Alexandra Merkulova	(Bulgaria) Silvia Miteva
Holon	(Russia) Alexandra Merkulova	(Bulgaria) Silvia Miteva	(Russia) Margarita Mamun
Thiais	(Russia) Margarita Mamun	(Russia) Alexandra Merkulova	(Israel) Neta Rivkin
Brno	(Russia) Margarita Mamun	(Russia) Daria Svatkovskaya	(Belarus) Melitina Staniouta
Berlin	(Russia) Margarita Mamun	(Russia) Maria Titova	(Bulgaria) Sylvia Miteva

==== Clubs ====
Competitions	Gold	Silver	Bronze
Moscow	(Russia) Margarita Mamun	(Bulgaria) Silvia Miteva	(South Korea) Son Yeon-jae
Holon	(Ukraine) Alina Maksymenko	(Belarus) Melitina Staniouta	(Israel) Victoria Filanovsky
Thiais	(Russia) Margarita Mamun	(Russia) Alexandra Merkulova	(Belarus) Melitina Staniouta
Brno	(Russia) Daria Svatkovskaya	(Belarus) Melitina Staniouta	(Israel) Victoria Filanovsky (Russia) Margarita Mamun
Berlin	(Russia) Daria Svatkovskaya	(Russia) Margarita Mamun	(Azerbaijan) Lala Yusifova

==== Ribbon ====
Competitions	Gold	Silver	Bronze
Moscow	(Russia) Daria Svatkovskaya	(Bulgaria) Silvia Miteva	(Russia) Margarita Mamun
Holon	(Russia) Maria Titova	(Belarus) Melitina Staniouta	(Ukraine) Alina Maksymenko
Thiais	(Russia) Margarita Mamun	(Bulgaria) Silvia Miteva	(Belarus) Melitina Staniouta
Brno	(Russia) Margarita Mamun	(Bulgaria) Silvia Miteva	(Belarus) Melitina Staniouta
Berlin	(Bulgaria) Sylvia Miteva	(Uzbekistan) Djamila Rakhmatova	(Belarus) Maria Kadobina

== See also ==
- List of medalists at the Rhythmic Gymnastics Grand Prix circuit (1994–2003)
- List of medalists at the Rhythmic Gymnastics Grand Prix circuit (2014–2023)
- List of medalists at the Rhythmic Gymnastics Grand Prix circuit (2024–2033)
