= Hanna Rabtsava =

Belarusian rhythmic gymnast (born 1994)

- Ганна Рабцава
- Born: 25 June 1994 (age 32) Belarus

Gymnastics career
- Discipline: Rhythmic gymnastics
- Country represented: Belarus (2008-2011)
- Club: Dinamo
- Head coach: Irina Leparskaya
- Choreographer: Galina Ryzhankova
- Retired: yes
Medal record
International gymnastics competitions
Event	1st	2nd	3rd
World Championships	0	2	0
European Championships	0	2	1
Grand Prix Final	0	0	1
Total	0	4	2
Rhythmic gymnastics
Representing Belarus
World Championships
Silver medal – second place	2010 Moscow	Team
Silver medal – second place	2011 Montpellier	Team
European Championships
Silver medal – second place	2011 Minsk	Team
Junior European Championships
Silver medal – second place	2008 Torino	Team
Bronze medal – third place	2008 Torino	Ball

Hanna Rabtsava (born 25 June 1994) is a retired Belarusian rhythmic gymnast. She is a European and World medalist.

== Career ==
As a junior, in 2008 she won silver in the team event at the European Championships in Turin alongside her teammates Aliaksandra Narkevich and Melitina Staniouta. She also earned a bronze medal in the ball final.

She turned senior in 2010 and debuted at the World Cup in Montreal. She ended 7th in the all-around, 5th with rope, 6th with hoop and ribbon and 8th with ball. At her next World Cup event in Debrecen, she was 6th in the hoop final, and she was 7th in the ball final at World Cup Portimão. At Grand Prix in Thiais, she won bronze with ribbon. In May she won bronze in the all-around and silver with ball at World Cup Corbeil-Essonnes. At World Cup Pesaro, she was 16th in the all-around. In September she was selected for the World Championships in Moscow, where she won gold in the team event along with Liubov Charkashyna, Melitina Staniouta, and Aliaksandra Narkevich.

In 2011, at the World Cup in Kalamata, she was 13th in the all-around and 6th with ball. She then won bronze with clubs in the next World Cup in Kyiv. At the European Championships in Minsk, she took 5th place in the ribbon final and won silver in teams with Charkashyna and Staniouta. In August she took 10th place in the all-around and 6th with ball at the World Cup in Sofia. At the World Championships in Montpellier, she was 23rd with hoop and 20th with ribbon. She also won silver in the team event with Charkashyna, Staniouta and Narkevich.
