= Yana Lukonina =

Russian rhythmic gymnast (born 1993)

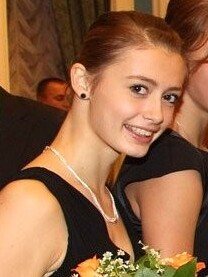

Personal information
- Full name: Yana Olegovna Lukonina
- Born: 26 September 1993 (age 32) Ryazan, Russia
- Height: 172 cm (5 ft 8 in)

Gymnastics career
- Discipline: Rhythmic gymnastics
- Country represented: Russia
- Head coach: Irina Viner
- Assistant coach: Amina Zaripova
- Retired: 2012
Medal record
Representing Russia
Rhythmic Gymnastics
World Championships
| Gold medal – first place | 2010 Moscow | Team |
Junior European Championships
| Gold medal – first place | 2008 Turin | Team |
| Gold medal – first place | 2008 Turin | Ball |

Yana Olegovna Lukonina (Russian: Яна Олеговна Луконина; born 26 September 1993) is a Russian retired individual rhythmic gymnast. She is the 2010 Russian National all-around bronze medalist.

== Career ==
Lukonina relocated to Novogorsk at 12 years old and began training under Amina Zaripova. She became the 2008 European Junior champion in ball held in Turin, Italy and also won the Junior Team gold medal.

Lukonina debuted in senior at the 2010 Season, she competed at the 2010 Montreal World Cup finishing 10th in all-around and won silver in ribbon finals. Lukonina finished 6th in all-around at the 2010 St. Petersburg World Cup. She then won the all-around bronze medal at the 2010 Russian Championships. She won silver in ribbon and finished 4th in ribbon finals at the 2010 Corbeil-Essonnes World Cup and finished 10th in the all-around at the 2010 Pesaro World Cup. Lukonina was selected as part of the Russian Team for the 2010 World Championships held in Moscow where she won the gold medal in the team event (together with Evgenia Kanaeva, Daria Kondakova and Daria Dmitrieva).

Lukonina competed at the 2011 Montreal World Cup along with Margarita Mamun, Lukonina won gold in hoop and bronze medals in clubs and ribbon. She then won the all-around bronze at the 2011 Kyiv World Cup. Lukonina suffered a serious back injury and decided to complete her career in the 2012 Season.
