= Silvia Miteva =

Bulgarian rhythmic gymnast

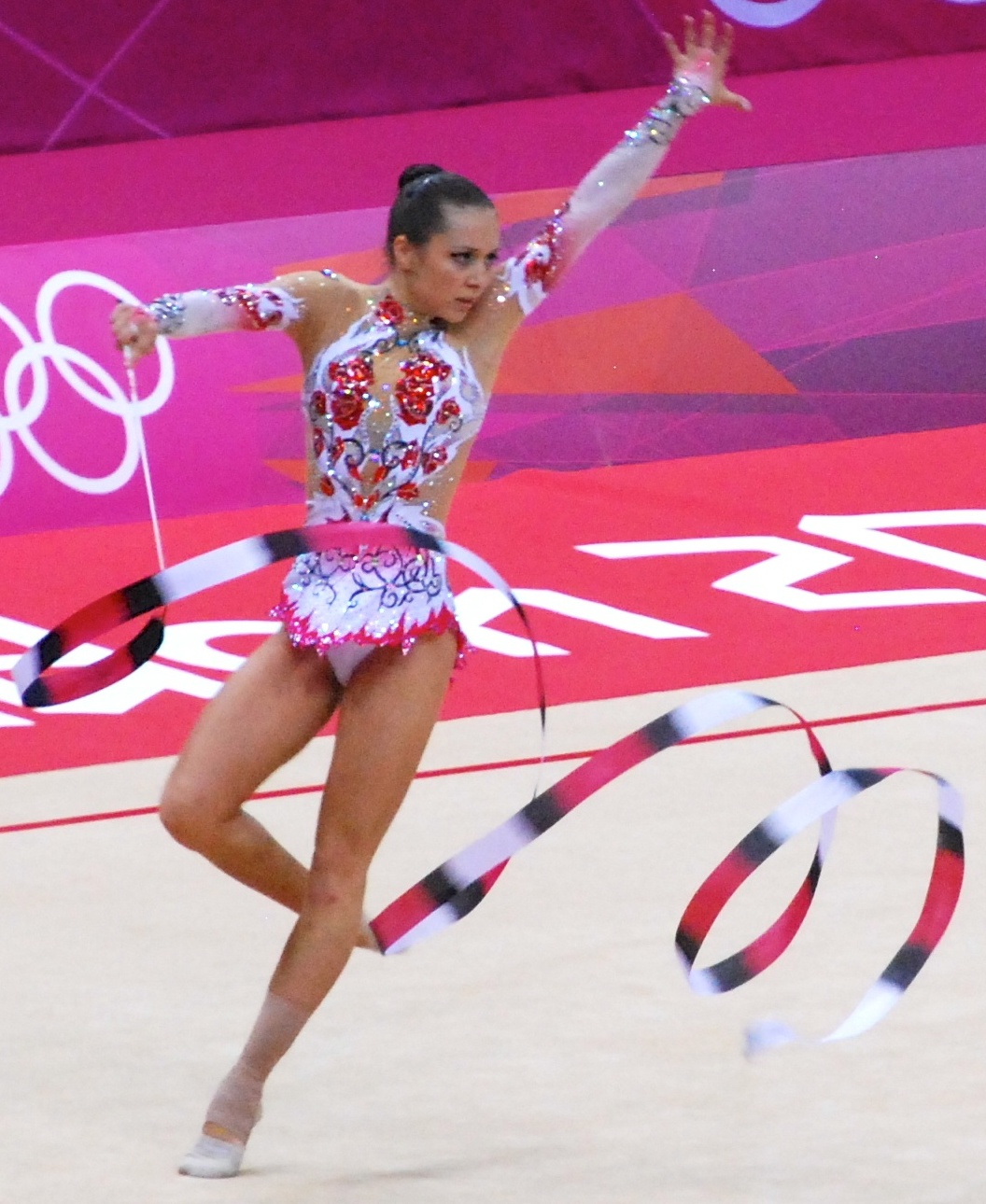
- Miteva performing with the ribbon at the 2012 Summer Olympics

Personal information
- Full name: Silvia Dimitrova Miteva
- Born: 24 June 1986 (age 40) Rousse, Bulgaria
- Height: 166 cm (5 ft 5 in)

Gymnastics career
- Discipline: Rhythmic gymnastics
- Country represented: Bulgaria; (2001-2013)
- Club: Iliana
- Head coach: Silviya Divcheva-Miteva
- Assistant coach: Dimitar Mitev
- Former coach: Silviya Divcheva-Miteva
- Retired: 2013
Medal record
Rhythmic Gymnastics
Representing Bulgaria
World Championships
Bronze medal – third place	2009 Mie	Ribbon
Bronze medal – third place	2011 Montpellier	Clubs
Bronze medal – third place	2011 Montpellier	Ribbon
European Championships
Bronze medal – third place	2011 Minsk	Ribbon
Bronze medal – third place	2013 Vienna	Ball
Bronze medal – third place	2013 Vienna	Ribbon
Grand Prix Final
Gold medal – first place	2013 Berlin	Ribbon
Bronze medal – third place	2013 Berlin	All-around
Bronze medal – third place	2013 Berlin	Ball
Bronze medal – third place	2013 Berlin	Hoop
World Games
Bronze medal – third place	2009 Kaohsiung	Hoop
Summer Universiade
Bronze medal – third place	2013 Kazan	Ribbon

Silvia Dimitrova Miteva (Bulgarian: Силвия Димитрова Митева; born 24 June 1986 in Rousse) is a retired Bulgarian individual rhythmic gymnast. She is the 2013 Grand Prix Final all-around bronze medalist.

== Career ==
Miteva was coached by her mother Silvia Divcheva-Miteva, who was a rhythmic gymnast for Bulgaria in the 1980s. She was a European and world champion. Miteva's father, Dimitar Mitev, is a Brevet judge and junior men's national coach in artistic gymnastics.

Miteva has been competing for the Bulgaria national team since 2001 and was one of the first players not based in Sofia to make her breakthrough at the time.

Miteva made her international debut in 2003 and competed a total of four world championships. She represented Bulgaria at the 2009 World Championships in Mie, Japan and won the bronze medal in ribbon finals.

In the 2011 season, Miteva won three silver medals and two silver medals the following year at the 2011 World Cup event held in Sofia. She then competed at the 2011 European Championships and won the bronze medal in ribbon. At 2011 World Championships individual final apparatus event, she won the bronze medal in Clubs and Ribbon.

In 2012, she won bronze in all-around at the Sofia World Cup behind silver medalist Daria Kondakova. Miteva competed at the 2012 Summer Olympics in London. She qualified for the finals and finished 8th overall.

In 2013, Miteva won the silver medal in All-around behind Russian gymnast Margarita Mamun at the 2013 Moscow Grand Prix. She also won silver in (ribbon, clubs) and bronze in (hoop, ball) finals. She won the all-around silver medal at the following Grand Prix in Holon, Israel. Miteva competed in home crowd at the 2013 Sofia World Cup, she won the silver medal in all-around behind Yana Kudryavtseva. At the event finals, Miteva won the gold medal in ribbon her first gold medal in a world cup, she won the silver medal in hoop and ball (tied with Neta Rivkin) and bronze in clubs. She then competed at the 2013 Minsk World Cup where she finished 5th in all-around behind Son Yeon-Jae, Miteva won bronze in ball final. Miteva then competed at the 2013 European Championships in Vienna, Austria where she won bronze medal in ball and ribbon final. Miteva then competed at the 2013 Summer Universiade in Kazan where she won bronze medal in ribbon. At the 2013 World Cup series in St.Petersburg, Russia, Miteva finished 5th in all-around behind Korean Son Yeon-Jae, she won bronze medal in ball final. She then competed at the 2013 World Championships in Kyiv, Ukraine where she qualified in all four event finals, she finished 4th in ball, 6th in hoop, 8th in clubs and ribbon. Miteva finished 9th at the 2013 World Championships All-around final. In October, she competed at the 2013 Grand Prix Brno and finished 4th in the all-around and won silver in ribbon.

She appeared in her last competition at the 2013 Grand Prix Final where she won bronze in the all-around, at the event finals she won bronze in ball, hoop and in her last routine, was able to win gold in ribbon. Miteva kissed the floor after her ribbon routine and tears in her eyes as she waved her goodbye at the audience. She completed her career after the Grand Prix Final and announced her retirement in November 2013.

She currently works as a coach for the Azerbaijan rhythmic gymnastics.

== Personal life ==
In 2013, Miteva married longtime boyfriend Ilia Yanev, brother of artistic gymnast Filip Yanev.

== Detailed Olympic results ==
Year	Competition Description	Location	Music	Apparatus	Score-Final	Score-Qualifying
2012	Olympics	London		All-around	108.950	110.925
2012	Olympics	London	Almoraima by Paco de Lucia	Ribbon	27.650	28.100
2012	Olympics	London	Caruso by Maga Zoltan	Ball	27.100	27.800
2012	Olympics	London	The King And His Sons, Landtrain by Harry Gregson-Williams, Brian Tyler	Hoop	27.450	27.700
2012	Olympics	London	Adagio in G minor by Budapest Film Orchestra, Dominic Miller and Nick Ingman	Clubs	26.750	27.325
