= Darya Dmitriyeva =

Russian rhythmic gymnast

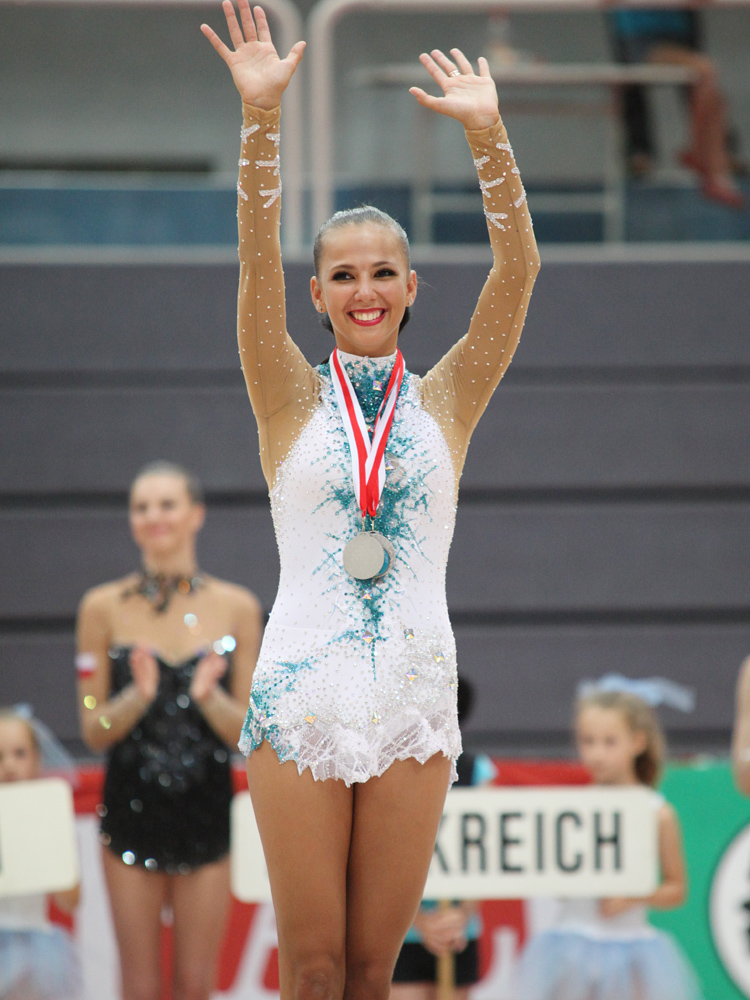
- Dmitriyeva at the 2012 Grand Prix Vorarlberg

Personal information
- Full name: Darya Andreyevna Dmitriyeva
- Alternative name: Daria Dmitrieva
- Nicknames: Busi, Dasha
- Born: 22 June 1993 (age 33) Irkutsk, Russia
- Height: 173 cm (5 ft 8 in)

Gymnastics career
- Discipline: Rhythmic gymnastics
- Country represented: Russia
- Club: Gazprom
- Gym: Novogorsk
- Head coach: Irina Viner
- Assistant coach: Olga Buyanova
- Choreographer: Veronika Shatkova, Irina Zenovka
- Eponymous skills: Pivot connecting turns (attitude turns + ring pivot turn with help)
- Retired: 2013
- World ranking: 2 (2012 Season); 2 (2011 Season); 3 (2010 Season); 9 (2009 Season)
Medal record
Rhythmic gymnastics
Representing Russia
Olympic Games
Silver medal – second place	2012 London	All-Around
World Championships
Gold medal – first place	2009 Mie	Team
Gold medal – first place	2010 Moscow	Ribbon
Gold medal – first place	2010 Moscow	Team
Gold medal – first place	2011 Montpellier	Team
Silver medal – second place	2010 Moscow	Ball
European Championships
Gold medal – first place	2011 Minsk	Team
Bronze medal – third place	2011 Minsk	Ball
Junior European Championships
Gold medal – first place	2008 Turin	Team
Gold medal – first place	2008 Turin	Ribbon
Grand Prix Final
Gold medal – first place	2012 Brno	All-around
Gold medal – first place	2012 Brno	Hoop
Gold medal – first place	2012 Brno	Ball
Gold medal – first place	2012 Brno	Clubs
Gold medal – first place	2012 Brno	Ribbon
Silver medal – second place	2010 Berlin	Ball
Silver medal – second place	2011 Brno	All-around
Silver medal – second place	2011 Brno	Hoop
Silver medal – second place	2011 Brno	Ball
Silver medal – second place	2011 Brno	Clubs
Silver medal – second place	2011 Brno	Ribbon
Bronze medal – third place	2010 Berlin	All-around
Summer Universiade
Gold medal – first place	2011 Shenzhen	Ribbon
Silver medal – second place	2011 Shenzhen	All-around
Silver medal – second place	2011 Shenzhen	Ball

Darya Andreyevna Dmitriyeva (Russian: Дарья Андреевна Дмитриева, IPA: [ˈdarʲjə ɐnˈdrʲe(j)ɪvnə ˈdmʲitrʲɪ(j)ɪvə]; born 22 June 1993) is a Russian rhythmic gymnast. She is the 2012 Olympic all-around silver medalist, the 2010 World ribbon champion, the 2012 Grand Prix Final all-around champion, 2011 Grand Prix Final all-around silver medalist and 2010 Grand Prix Final all-around bronze medalist.

== Personal life ==
In May 2015, Dmitriyeva married ice hockey player Alexander Radulov who was then playing for Dallas Stars of the National Hockey League. She gave birth to their first child, a son named Makar, on 11 November 2015. The pair divorced on 7 June 2017.

== Career ==
Dmitriyeva appeared internationally competing at the 2008 Kyiv World Cup winning the gold in juniors all-around. She became the 2008 European Junior champion in ribbon in Turin, Italy and also won the Junior Team gold medal.

She is coached by Olga Buyanova, who has also coached gymnasts Oxana Kostina and Natalia Lipkovskaya who are also both from Irkutsk.

In 2009, Dmitriyeva broke onto the international scene competing in important competitions like Corbeil-Essonnes. She was selected by Irina Viner to be a part of the main Russian national team. Dmitrieva went to the 2009 World Championships in Mie as a part of the national team with Evgenia Kanaeva, Olga Kapranova and Daria Kondakova. In qualifications she only competed with ball and helped her team to win the gold in the team competition. She qualified to the ball final with a score of 27.500 and finished in fourth place behind Ukraine's Anna Bessonova.

In 2010, Dmitriyeva was again part of the Russian national team. She had a successful season winning silver in all-around at the 2010 World Cup Saint Petersburg ahead of teammate Daria Kondakova, she also won two silver medals in hoop and rope final behind Evgenia Kanaeva. At the 2010 World Championships in Moscow, she helped her team to win the gold medal in the team competition and qualified for the ball and ribbon final. In the ball final she scored 28.650 to win the silver medal, finishing 0.050 points behind her teammate Evgenia Kanaeva. In the ribbon final she scored 28.825 to win the gold medal.

In 2011, At the 2011 World Cup in Corbeil-Essonnes Dmitriyeva won silver in all-around, she won another pair of silver medals in clubs and ribbon final. She then competed at the 2011 Summer Universiade where she won the all-around silver medal, she won gold in the ribbon final ahead of teammate and 2008 Olympic champion Evgenia Kanaeva. She won the gold medal in all-around at the 2011 World Cup series held in Tashkent.

In 2012, Dmitriyeva started her season at the Moscow Grand Prix where she won the bronze medal in all-around, at the event finals; she won gold in ball and silver in hoop. She competed at the World Cup in Kyiv where she won a total of 4 gold medals in all-around and apparatus finals in clubs, hoop and ribbon ahead of Ukrainian Alina Maksymenko. A foot injury led her to withdraw from the World Cup series in Tashkent and the selection for a 2012 European spot in the Russian national team.

The head coach of Russia, President of the Russian Federation of Rhythmic Gymnastics, Irina Viner said the question of participation in the Olympics remained open and would be resolved only after the June Grand Prix in Austria and the World Cup in Belarus in July.

Dmitriyeva returned to competition at the Grand Prix Vorarlberg in Austria. She won the silver medal in all-around behind Evgenia Kanaeva and ahead of Alexandra Merkulova who won the bronze medal. In the event finals, Dmitriyeva won the gold medal in ribbon, as well as silver medals in ball and clubs. She then again won the silver medal in the all-around at the World Cup series in Minsk as well as silver medals for the event finals in hoop, ball and ribbon. Despite these results, Alexandra Merkulova was named as Russia's nominal second entry in rhythmic gymnastics, together with reigning 2008 Olympic Champion Evgenia Kanaeva. Viner stated that the final decision was yet to be confirmed and she would fly on July 21 to the pre-Olympic training camp in the UK.

=== 2012 Olympic season ===
On August 2, 2012, it was finally determined that Russia's entries at the Olympic Games in London would be Evgenia Kanaeva and Darya Dmitriyeva, replacing teammate Alexandra Merkulova who began to struggle with a foot injury at the Russian gymnastic test practices in London.

Dmitriyeva was ranked first on the first day of qualifications ahead of teammate Kanaeva, who fumbled and dropped the hoop. On the second day of qualifications, Dmitriyeva finished second overall with a total score of 114.525, behind Kanaeva who scored a total of 116.000.

In the Olympic all-around finals, Dmitriyeva took the highest in ribbon with 29.100 and scored a total of 114.500 points to win the silver medal behind compatriot Evgenia Kanaeva. On winning her silver medal, Dmitriyeva said: "I am feeling excellent. It was hard for me to get it and I am very happy. It's a very worthwhile medal to have won. I'm not only proud of myself, I am proud of my country. There are so many people, wonderful coaches and our parents."

Dmitriyeva competed at the 2012 Aeon Cup in Japan and won the all-around gold medal. On November 4, Dmitriyeva competed at the 2012 Grand Prix Final in Brno, Czech Rep. and won her first Grand Prix Final all-around title. She also won the gold medal at the event finals in hoop, ball, clubs and ribbon.

=== Retirement ===
On 26 February 2013, at a press conference led by Russian head coach Irina Viner, it was suggested that Dmitriyeva might retire from competition due to a recurring leg injury from severe stress, however her personal coach, Olga Buyanova, said she was only pausing her career in order to heal. She underwent surgery in Germany for her ankle ligament injury.

On 4 September 2013, Dmitriyeva announced her retirement, saying "I have finished competing and am moving on to the next phase of my life. I have finally decided on what I want to do in the future - try my hand at different areas. I convey my sincere good wishes back a thousandfold to all those people who wrote to me and still support and root for me. I am very grateful to all these people." Buyanova stated: "She has decided to end her career. It was her own decision and we have no right to challenge it. Not forgetting that her departure in the sport is associated with quite a serious injury, in the world of gymnastics time plays the most important role and the mode of intensive training and competitions can often have a very serious impact on the career of an athlete".

On February 15, 2015, a star-studded gala was held in Russia for the 80th founding anniversary of rhythmic gymnastics. The venue was held in the historical Mariinsky Theatre in Saint Petersburg. Among those who performed at the gala were Russian former Olympic champions, Olympic medalists and World champions including: Dmitriyeva, Evgenia Kanaeva, Yulia Barsukova, Irina Tchachina, and Yana Batyrshina.

== Competitive highlights ==
Year	Event	Team	AA	Hoop	Ball	Clubs	Ribb.
International
2008	Aeon Cup	1st	1st J				

== Routine music information ==
Year	Apparatus	Music title
2012	Hoop	Piano Concerto No. 2 In C-minor, Op. 18: I. Moderato by Sergei Rachmaninoff
2012	Ball	Ave Maria by Libera, Immortelle by Lara Fabian
2012	Clubs	Beat Machine / The Expert / Tradition by Gloria Estefan / Yello / Unknown
2012	Ribbon	Revolutions by Jean Michel Jarre
2011	Hoop	Piano Concerto No. 2 In C-minor, Op. 18: I. Moderato by Sergei Rachmaninoff
2011	Ball (second)	Love Song by Mark Fradkin
2011	Ball (first)	Cell Block Tango music from Chicago! by John Kander
2011	Clubs	Sam's Blues by Sam Taylor
2011	Ribbon	Revolutions by Jean Michel Jarre
2010	Hoop	Vdol po Piterskoy (Russia folk music)
2010	Ball	A naposledok ya skazhu (А на последок я скажу) from Zhestokiy romans Ruthless Romance by Andrei Petrov
2010	Rope	White Darbouka by Hovannes K.
2010	Ribbon	Epilog music from Skazka stranstvij by Alfred Schnittke
2009	Hoop	El Tango de Roxanne music from Moulin Rouge
2009	Ball (second)	Introducci; Moderato Assai, Allegro from Swan lake by Pyotr Tchaikovsky
2009	Ball (first)	Adagio music from Spartacus by Aram Khatchaturian
2009	Rope	Mozzarella (Gaeten Fabri Remix) by Kal
2009	Ribbon	?
2008	Hoop	"Don't Let Me Be Misunderstood" music from Kill Bill 1 by Santa Esmeralda
2008	Ball	A Comme Amour (L for Love) by Richard Clayderman
2008	Rope	The Red Army Ensemble "Kamarinskaya" (Russian folk) by Solo balalaika player - Boris Feoktistov
2008	Ribbon	Una Musica Brutal by Gotan Project

== Detailed Olympic results ==
Year	Competition Description	Location	Music	Apparatus	Score-Final	Score-Qualifying
2012	Olympics	London		All-around	114.500	114.525
2012	Olympics	London	Revolutions by Jean Michel Jarre	Ribbon	29.100	28.925
2012	Olympics	London	Ave Maria by Libera; Immortelle by Lara Fabian	Ball	28.350	28.800
2012	Olympics	London	Piano Concerto No. 2 In C-minor; Op. 18: I. Moderato by Sergei Rachmaninoff	Hoop	28.300	29.000
2012	Olympics	London	Beat Machine by Gloria Estefan; The Expert by Yello; Tradition by Unknown	Clubs	28.750	27.800
