= Liubov Charkashyna =

Belarusian rhythmic gymnast

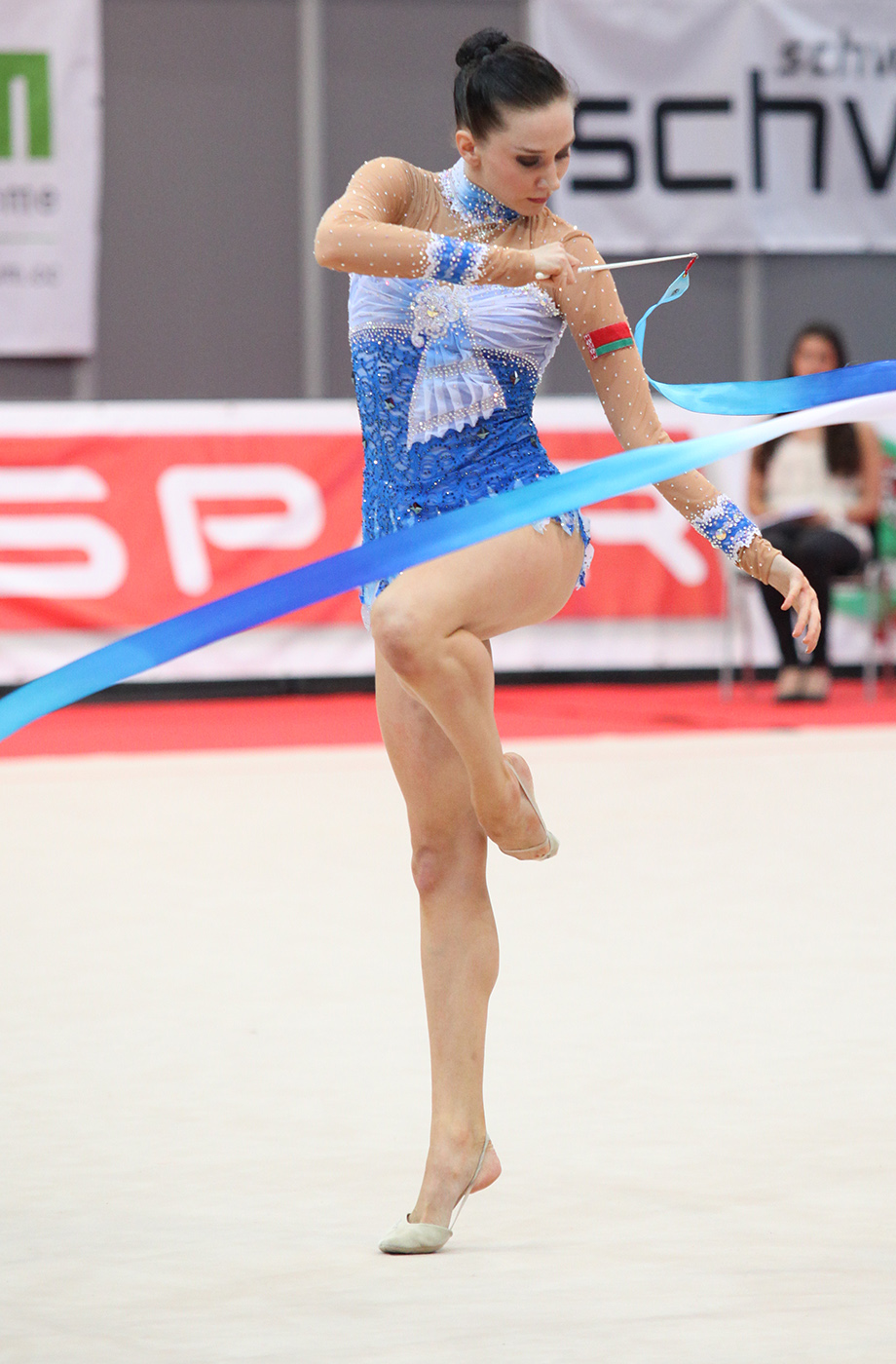
- Charkashyna at the 2012 Grand Prix Vorarlberg

Personal information
- Full name: Liubov Viktorovna Charkashyna
- Nickname: Lyuba
- Born: December 23, 1987 (age 38) Brest, Byelorussian SSR, Soviet Union
- Height: 173 cm (5 ft 8 in)

Gymnastics career
- Discipline: Rhythmic gymnastics
- Country represented: Belarus; (2002-2012)
- Head coach: Irina Leparskaya
- Assistant coach: Galina Zolotnickaya
- Retired: 2012
- World ranking: 9 (2012 Season); 3 (2011 Season)
Medal record
Rhythmic gymnastics
Representing Belarus
Olympic Games
Bronze medal – third place	2012 London	All-around
World Championships
Silver medal – second place	2007 Patras	Team
Silver medal – second place	2009 Mie	Team
Silver medal – second place	2010 Moscow	Team
Silver medal – second place	2011 Montpellier	Team
Bronze medal – third place	2003 Budapest	Team
Bronze medal – third place	2005 Baku	Team
Bronze medal – third place	2011 Montpellier	Ball
European Championships
Gold medal – first place	2011 Minsk	Ball
Gold medal – first place	2011 Minsk	Clubs
Silver medal – second place	2011 Minsk	Team
Bronze medal – third place	2005 Moscow	Team
Bronze medal – third place	2011 Minsk	Hoop
European Team Championships
Bronze medal – third place	2003 Moscow	Team
Grand Prix Final
Silver medal – second place	2010 Berlin	Hoop
Bronze medal – third place	2007 Innsbruck	Ribbon
Bronze medal – third place	2010 Berlin	Rope
Bronze medal – third place	2010 Berlin	Ribbon
Summer Universiade
Bronze medal – third place	2011 Shenzhen	All-around
Bronze medal – third place	2011 Shenzhen	Ribbon
Bronze medal – third place	2011 Shenzhen	Ball

Liubov Viktorovna Charkashyna (Belarusian: Любоў Віктараўна Чаркашына; Russian: Любовь Викторовна Черкашина, born December 23, 1987) is a retired Belarusian individual rhythmic gymnast. She is the 2012 Olympic all-around bronze medalist, and the 2011 European ball and clubs champion. Since 2026, she is the head coach of Belarusian rhythmic gymnastics national team.

== Competitive career ==
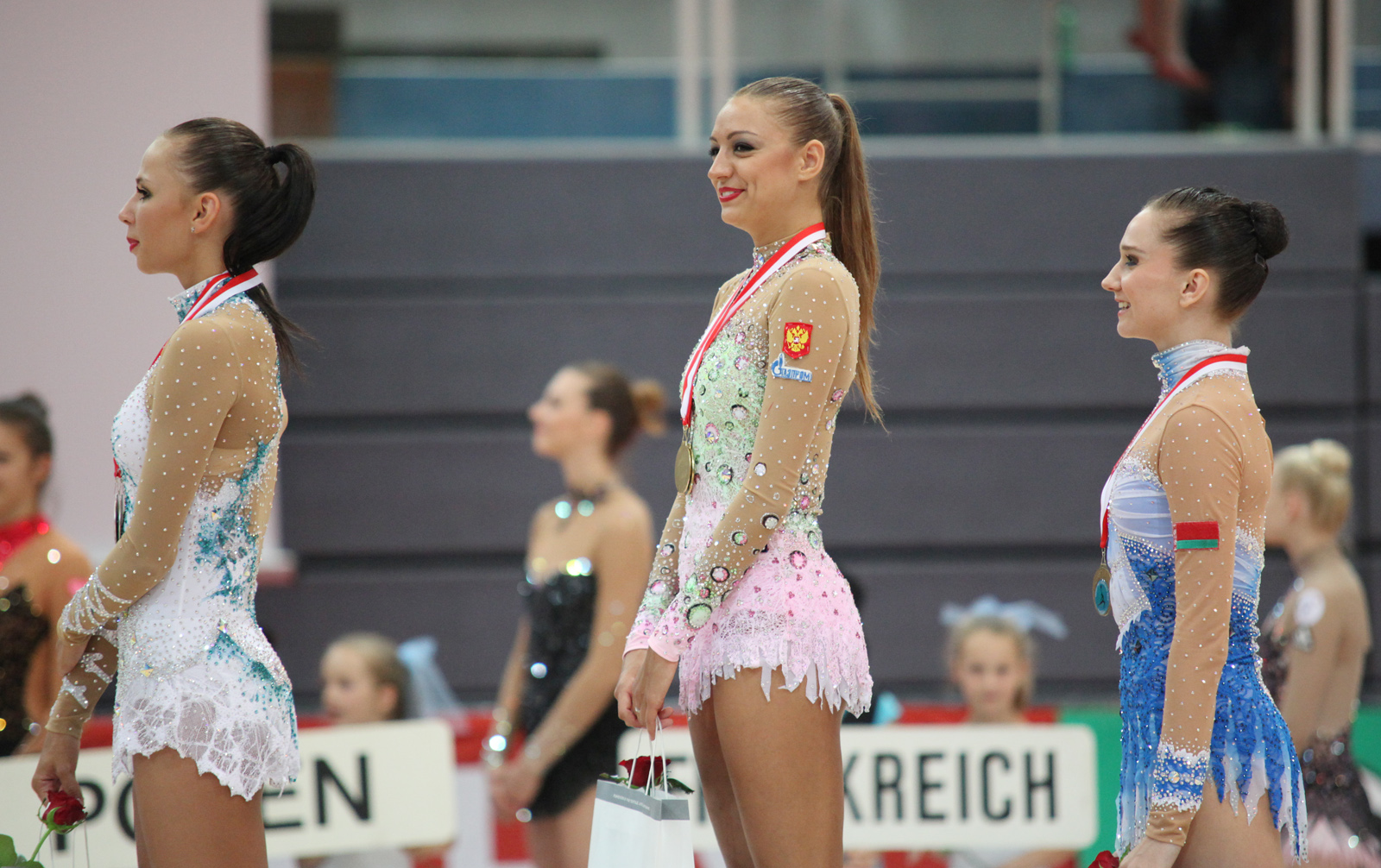
Charkashyna at the 2012 Grand Prix Vorarlberg all-around podium

Charkashyna started training in rhythmic gymnastics at a relatively late age, when she was nine years old. She made her senior international debut in 2003. She had a successful 2007 season, winning bronze in ribbon at the Grand Prix Final in Innsbruck, Austria.

Charkashyna competed at the 2008 Summer Olympics and placed 15th in qualifications. She did not advance to the top 10 finals round.

At the 2010 Grand Prix final in Berlin, Charkashyna won the silver medal in hoop and bronze medal in rope and ribbon final. 2011 marked her breakthrough season. She won the bronze all-around medal at the World Cup in Corbeil-Essonnes, as well as bronze in the all-around, ball and hoop at the 2011 World Cup series in Tashkent. On May 29, at the 2011 European Championships in Minsk, she became the only Belarusian senior gymnast to win two individual gold medals at one European Championship, winning the ball final and the clubs final against reigning World and Olympic champion, Evgenia Kanaeva. Charkashyna also won the bronze medal in the hoop finals.

Charkashyna was the bronze medalist in All-around at the 2011 Summer Universiade. At the 2011 World Championships held in Montpellier, France, she finished fourth in All-around and won bronze in the ball apparatus.

In the 2012 season, Charkashyna won gold in the individual ribbon finals at the World Cup in Tashkent, as well as silver (hoop) and bronze (ball). She placed fourth in All-around at the 2012 European Championships behind Aliya Garayeva. At the 2012 World Cup series held in Minsk, Belarus, she won the bronze medal in the All-around ahead of Russian gymnast Alexandra Merkulova who finished fourth.

At the 2012 Olympics, Charkashyna placed fifth in the qualifications with a score of 110.450. In the finals, she was able to edge out rival Aliya Garayeva for the bronze medal. After her final ribbon routine, she kissed the carpet. As soon as the overall scores appeared, she shed tears of joy when she saw that she had won the bronze medal with a total score of 111.700. Charkashyna retired from competition at the end of the 2012 season.

== Later career ==
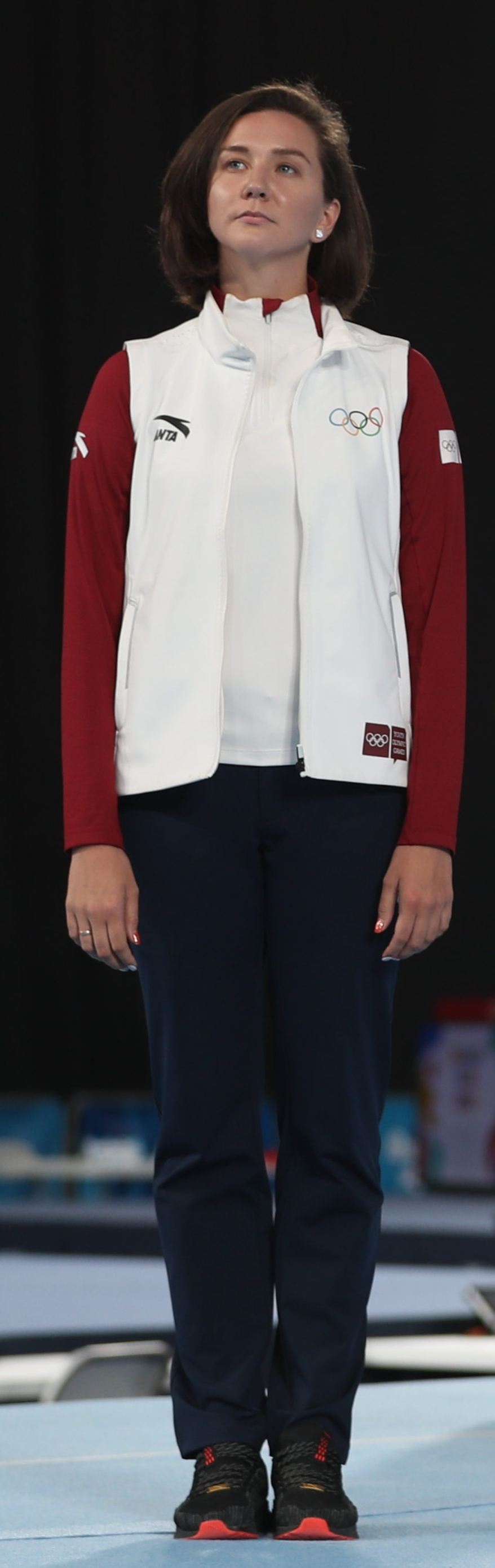
Charkashyna in her role as an FIG Athletes' Commission representative and Athlete Role Model during a victory ceremony of the 2018 Summer Youth Olympics.

Charkashyna worked as a rhythmic gymnastics coach and judge. In 2013, she became an RSW brand ambassador. That same year, after the World Championships held in Kyiv, Ukraine, Charkashyna was elected as the rhythmic gymnastics representative on the FIG Athletes' Commission. Charkashyna held this position from 2014 to 2017. She then became the FIG Athletes' Commission president, for the term of 2017 to 2020. In 2019, Charkashyna commented on sexual abuse in gymnastics, saying that abuse is horrible, but she believes the problem is not widespread and some cases are "an opportunity to earn money."

== Personal life ==
Charkashyna is married to a former Belarusian football player, Victor Molashko.

On January 16, 2018, Charkashyna gave birth to baby girl, Vera.

== Routine music information ==
Year	Apparatus	Music title
2012	Hoop	Primavera Porteña by Astor Piazzolla
2012	Ball	Frozen in time by Secret Garden
2012	Clubs	Caravan by Raimond Pauls
2012	Ribbon	Love Story by Francis Lai
2012	Gala	Gorod by Elena Vaenga
2011	Hoop	Mission Impossible by Maxime Rodriguez
2011	Ball	Naprasnie Slova by Alexander Malinin, instrumental version arranged especially for routine
2011	Clubs	Green Hornet music from Kill Bill by Al Hirt
2011	Ribbon	?
2011	Gala	La Monture by Julie Zenatti
2010	Hoop	Sunrise, Sunset by Roby Lakatos
2010	Ball	Embrace music from Breathe by Nicholas Gunn
2010	Rope	Belarus folk
2010	Ribbon	?
2009	Hoop	Sunrise, Sunset by Roby Lakatos
2009	Ball	Embrace music from Breathe by Nicholas Gunn
2009	Rope	Tango by Konstantin Meladze
2009	Ribbon	Weary Sun by Jerzy Peterburgski
2008	Hoop	Leelos Tune by Maksim
2008	Rope	Felicia music from Tango Forever by Luis Bravo
2008	Clubs	Czardas (Monti, Czardas Pr Violon & Piano) from Classic Meets Cuba by Klazz Brothers & Cuba Percussion
2008	Ribbon	Tsyganochka
2007	Hoop	Against The Wind by Keiko Matsui
2007	Rope	Felicia music Tango Forever by Luis Bravo
2007	Clubs	Lo Que Vendra by Astor Piazzolla
2007	Ribbon	?
2006	Rope	Chappa by Didulya
2006	Ball	No Stop City by New Tango Orquesta
2006	Clubs	Batwannis Beek by REG Project
2006	Ribbon	?
2005	Rope	Chappa by Didulya
2005	Ball	Czardas (remix) by Vittorio Monti
2005	Clubs	Batwannis Beek by REM Project
2005	Ribbon	Croatian Rhapsody by Maksim Mrvica
2004	Hoop	Ov Haiots Ashkhar by Ara Ghevorkian
2004	Ball	Czardas (remix) by Vittorio Monti
2004	Clubs	Batwannis Beek by REM Project
2004	Ribbon	Winter by Bond
2003	Hoop	Vive el Verano by Paulina Rubio
2003	Ball	Czardas (remix) by Vittorio Monti
2003	Clubs	Batwannis Beek by REM Project
2003	Ribbon	?

== Detailed Olympic results ==
Year	Competition description	Location	Music	Apparatus	Score-final	Score-qualifying
2012	Olympics	London		All-around	111.700	110.450
2012	Olympics	London	Love Story by Francis Lai	Ribbon	28.075	26.550
2012	Olympics	London	Frozen in time by Secret Garden	Ball	28.000	28.400
2012	Olympics	London	Primavera Porteña by Astor Piazzolla	Hoop	28.100	28.050
2012	Olympics	London	Caravan by Raimond Pauls	Clubs	27.525	27.450
