= Daria Kondakova =

Russian rhythmic gymnast

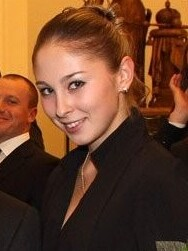
- Kondakova in 2010

Personal information
- Full name: Daria Vladimirovna Kondakova
- Nickname: Dasha
- Born: 30 July 1991 (age 35) Sochi, Krasnodar Krai
- Height: 169 cm (5 ft 7 in)

Gymnastics career
- Discipline: Rhythmic gymnastics
- Country represented: Russia
- Club: Dinamo Dmitrov
- Head coach: Irina Viner
- Assistant coach: Anna Shumilova
- Former coach: Natalia Razgonjuk
- Choreographer: Veronica Shatkova
- Eponymous skills: Pivot Turn revolutions (pivot turn with forward free leg to half free leg position)
- Retired: 2012
- World ranking: 3 (2012 Season); 1 (2011 Season); 2 (2010 Season); 5 (2009 Season)
Medal record
Representing Russia
Rhythmic Gymnastics
World Championships
Gold medal – first place	2009 Mie	Team
Gold medal – first place	2010 Moscow	Rope
Gold medal – first place	2010 Moscow	Team
Gold medal – first place	2011 Montpellier	Team
Silver medal – second place	2009 Mie	All-around
Silver medal – second place	2009 Mie	Rope
Silver medal – second place	2009 Mie	Hoop
Silver medal – second place	2010 Moscow	All-around
Silver medal – second place	2010 Moscow	Hoop
Silver medal – second place	2010 Moscow	Ribbon
Silver medal – second place	2011 Montpellier	All-around
Silver medal – second place	2011 Montpellier	Hoop
Silver medal – second place	2011 Montpellier	Ball
Silver medal – second place	2011 Montpellier	Clubs
Silver medal – second place	2011 Montpellier	Ribbon
European Championships
Gold medal – first place	2011 Minsk	Team
Silver medal – second place	2010 Bremen	All-around
Silver medal – second place	2011 Minsk	Hoop
Silver medal – second place	2011 Minsk	Ribbon
Junior European Championships
Gold medal – first place	2006 Moscow	Team
Gold medal – first place	2006 Moscow	Ribbon
Grand Prix Final
Silver medal – second place	2009 Berlin	All-around
Silver medal – second place	2009 Berlin	Rope
Silver medal – second place	2009 Berlin	Ball
Silver medal – second place	2010 Berlin	All-around
Silver medal – second place	2010 Berlin	Rope
Silver medal – second place	2010 Berlin	Ribbon
Bronze medal – third place	2009 Berlin	Ribbon
Summer Universiade
Bronze medal – third place	2009 Belgrade	Ball
Bronze medal – third place	2009 Belgrade	Rope
Bronze medal – third place	2009 Belgrade	Ribbon

Daria Vladimirovna Kondakova (Russian: Дарья Владимировна Кондакова; born 30 July 1991) is a Russian retired individual rhythmic gymnast. She is a three-time (2011, 2010, 2009) World all-around silver medalist, the 2010 European all-around silver medalist and two-time (2010, 2009) Grand Prix Final all-around silver medalist. She was coached by Anna Shumilova. She now works as a rhythmic gymnastics coach and choreographer.

== Career ==
As a junior, Kondakova won gold in all-around at the 2006 Holon Junior Grand Prix and Calais International tournament. She also won gold at the 2006 European Junior Championships in ribbon as well as the junior team event. She briefly competed as a part of the Russian national group until 2008.

Kondakova's individual breakthrough came in 2009 when she won the all around silver medal at the Worlds Championships in Mie just behind teammate and 2008 Olympic champion Evgenia Kanaeva. She is a three-time World Championship silver medalist in all-around for three consecutive years, having won the silver medal in four individual apparatus in clubs, hoop, ribbon and ball. In 2010, Kondakova repeated her success as the all-around silver medalist for World Cup events in Pesaro and Portimao as well as in Grand Prix and international tournaments. At the 2011 World Championships in Montpellier, France, she won the silver medal in the all-around and in all four individual apparatus, 0.05 points behind Kanaeva.

=== 2012 season and injury ===
In 2012, Kondakova opted to participate at the London test qualifications for the 2012 Summer Olympics, winning the qualifications event. At the World Cup event in Penza, she won gold in ball apparatus as well as the all around. In Sofia and Pesaro, she won the silver medal in all-around behind Evgenia Kanaeva. Kondakova sustained a knee injury and was replaced by Alexandra Merkulova at the 2012 European Championships. At the 2012 Moscow Grand Prix, she won the all-around competition.

Irina Viner, the Russian head coach and President of the Russian Federation of Rhythmic Gymnastics, said the issue of participation in the Olympics remained open and would be resolved only after the June Grand Prix in Austria and the World Cup in Belarus in July. Kondakova underwent minor surgery for her knee in Germany. A conference in June 2012 by Irina Viner she said that a relapse of an old Anterior cruciate ligament (ACL) injury prevented Kondakova from competing: "Only a miracle could help Kondakova to recover in time for Olympic Games. We are now trying all possible ways for Kondakova to recover. She is not ready to compete at the World Cup. She will continue training after the World Cup (in Minsk) but it's not certain if it will be enough preparation up to August 9." Viner said that Alexandra Merkulova and Daria Dmitrieva would compete for the second Olympic berth.

== Post-Retirement and Coaching career ==
Kondakova retired from rhythmic gymnastics shortly after her knee surgery. Her coach Anna Shumilova said “She had a very serious injury, the recovery from which takes about half a year, It’s too late to start all over again.”

Kondakova has begun working as coach following her retirement, as well as choreographing for routines and music. She is coaching Iuliia Bravikova.

her past students/clients have included:

- Patricia Bezzoubenko
- Maria Titova
- Victoria Veinberg Filanovsky

== Personal life ==
Kondakova was born in Sochi, Russia.

== Routine music information ==
Year	Apparatus	Music title
2012	Hoop	The Gypsies; Journey Across Europe / Fanatico Master music from Oxford / KOI by John Corigliano / Edvin Marton & Ari Zakaryan
2012	Ball (second)	La Voce Del Silenzio / Se Bruciasse La Citta by Massimo Ranieri, Silvia Mezzanotte, Linda Valori
2012	Ball (first)	Una Patada En Los Huevos music from la piel que habito by Alberto Iglesias
2012	Clubs	Asturias by David Garrett
2012	Ribbon	Night on Bald Mountain music from Saturday Night Fever by David Shire
2011	Hoop	The Gypsies; Journey Across Europe / Fanatico Master music from Oxford / KOI by John Corigliano / Edvin Marton & Ari Zakaryan
2011	Ball	Stop by Sam Brown
2011	Clubs	Summer music from Encore by David Garrett
2011	Ribbon	Delicado/Tico Tico music from Grandes Exitos Raul Di Blasio
2010	Hoop	Wall Breached / To Jerusalem / Better Man music from Kingdom of Heaven by Harry Gregson-Williams
2010	Ball	Scherzo (Symphony nr. 9 in D Minor) by Anton Bruckner
2010	Rope	The Firebird by Igor Stravinsky
2010	Ribbon (second)	Walpurgis Night (Danse de Phryne) from Faust by Charles Gounod
2010	Ribbon (first)	Concerto de Berlin by Vladimir Cosma
2009	Hoop	Dance Of The Soviet Sailors music from The Red Poppy by Reinhold Gliere
2009	Ball (second)	Por una Cabeza by Itzhak Perlman
2009	Ball (first)	Anyuta by Valeri Gavrilin
2009	Rope	Quixote music from Born by Bond
2009	Ribbon	La Habanera by Yello
