= Yelyzaveta Karabash =

Ukrainian rhythmic gymnast

- Born: 21 June 1985 (age 41) Dnipropetrovsk, Ukrainian SSR, Soviet Union
- Height: 178 cm (5 ft 10 in)

Gymnastics career
- Discipline: Rhythmic gymnastics
- Country represented: Ukraine
- Club: Deriugins School
- Head coach: Albina Deriugina
- Assistant coach: Irina Deriugina
- Retired: yes
Medal record
Rhythmic gymnastics
Representing Ukraine
World Championships
Gold medal – first place	2002 New Orleans	5 ribbons
European Championships
Silver medal – second place	2001 Geneva	5 clubs

Yelyzaveta Karabash (born 21 June 1985) is a Ukrainian retired rhythmic gymnast.

She competed at the Olympic Games in Athens as a member of the Ukrainian group. In the group all-around, the Ukrainian team, which was also represented by Olena Dzyubchuk, Maria Bila, Yulia Chernova, Inha Kozhokina and Oksana Paslas, took 9th place in qualification and did not reach the final. Ukraine scored 42.150 points and lost by 2.450 points the 8th and last place for the final to Spain.
