= Yulia Chernova =

Ukrainian rhythmic gymnast

- Born: 2 March 1986 (age 40) Mykolaiv, Ukrainian SSR, Soviet Union
- Height: 174 cm (5 ft 9 in)

Gymnastics career
- Discipline: Rhythmic gymnastics
- Country represented: Ukraine
- Club: Deriugins School
- Head coach: Albina Deriugina
- Assistant coach: Irina Deriugina
- Retired: yes

Yulia Chernova (born 2 March 1986) is a Ukrainian retired rhythmic gymnast.

She competed at the Olympic Games in Athens as a member of the Ukrainian group. In the group all-around, the Ukrainian team, which was also represented by Olena Dzyubchuk, Maria Bila, Yelyzaveta Karabash, Inga Kozhokina and Oksana Paslas, took 9th place in qualification and did not reach the final. Ukraine scored 42.150 points and lost by 2.450 points the 8th and last place for the final to Spain.
