= Daria Kushnerova =

Ukrainian rhythmic gymnast

- Born: 2 November 1992 (age 33) Kyiv, Ukraine
- Height: 154 cm (5 ft 1 in)

Gymnastics career
- Discipline: Rhythmic gymnastics
- Country represented: Ukraine
- Club: Deriugins School
- Head coach: Albina Deriugina
- Assistant coach: Irina Deriugina
Medal record
Rhythmic Gymnastics
Representing Ukraine
European Championships
Bronze medal – third place	2009 Baku	Team
Junior European Championships
Bronze medal – third place	2006 Moscow	Clubs
Bronze medal – third place	2006 Moscow	Ribbon

Daria Kushnerova (Ukrainian: Дарія Кушнерова, born 2 November 1992) is a retired individual rhythmic gymnast.

== Career ==
=== Junior ===
In 2006, Daria represented her club Deriugins School at the Aeon Cup in junior competition, winning a silver medal in all-around event.

Later she competed at the 2006 Rhythmic Gymnastics European Championships in junior individual competition, receiving two bronze medals in clubs and ribbon events and finishing 4th in team event.

In 2007, she competed at the Deriugina Cup as a serie of Rhythmic Gymnastics World Cup in juniors competition, winning gold medals in all-around competition, hoop and ball events and a silver medal in rope event.

At the 2007 Aeon Cup, Daria as a member of Deriugins School won a silver medal in junior all-around competition.

=== Senior ===
In 2009, Daria won a bronze medal at the 2009 Rhythmic Gymnastics European Championships in team event with Alina Maksymenko and Anna Bessonova.
