= Anastasiia Mulmina =

Ukrainian rhythmic gymnast (born 1997)

- Full name: Anastasiia Kostiantynivna Mulmina
- Nicknames: Mulya, Mulychka
- Born: 27 April 1997 (age 29) Nikopol, Dnipropetrovsk Oblast, Ukraine
- Height: 170 cm (5 ft 7 in)

Gymnastics career
- Discipline: Rhythmic gymnastics
- Country represented: Ukraine; (2009 - present)
- College team: Kyiv National University of Physical Education and Sport of Ukraine
- Club: Deriugins School
- Head coach: Irina Deriugina
Medal record
Group rhythmic gymnastics
Representing Ukraine
Summer Universiade
Gold medal – first place	2015 Gwangju	6 Clubs / 2 Hoops
Silver medal – second place	2015 Gwangju	Group All-around
Silver medal – second place	2015 Gwangju	5 Ribbons
Junior European Championships
Bronze medal – third place	2012 Nizhy Novgorod	Ball

Anastasiia Kostiantynivna Mulmina (Ukrainian: Анастасія Костянтинівна Мульміна, born 27 April 1997) is a Ukrainian retired rhythmic gymnast. She is the 2012 European Junior bronze medalist in ball.

== Career ==
=== Junior ===
In 2009, Mulmina moved from Nikopol, Dnipropetrovsk Oblast, into the School of Olympic Reserve until in 2011, she began training under the Deriugins School (also known as the Deriugina School). She competed in level 4 (Gymnast born 1996~1997) at the 2009 Pader-Gymnastics Cup in Paderborn, Germany, finished 3rd in the all-around ahead of Azeri gymnast Lala Yusifova. On April 1–4, Mulmina competed at the 2011 Junior Irina Deleanu Trophy finished 4th in all-around, she qualified to 4 apparatus finals: she ranked 3rd in ball and hoop, 2nd in ribbon, 4th in clubs.

On March 16–18, Mulmina won team silver medal at the 2012 Kyiv Junior World Cup with Eleonora Romanova. Then Mulmina and Eleonora Romanova competed at the 2012 European Junior Championships were Team Ukraine finished 4th, she qualified to 2 event finals taking a bronze medal in ball and finished 6th in clubs. On June 14–17, Mulmina burst onto the junior international scene at the 2012 Junior Irina Deleanu Trophy where she won gold in the all-around and event finals in hoop, ball, clubs and ribbon. On September 28–30, Mulmina together with teammates Ganna Rizatdinova and Viktoria Mazur represented Team Deriugins School at the Aeon Cup in Tokyo, Japan, Mulmina finished 4th in junior individual all-around finals behind Azeri gymnast Marina Durunda with team Ukraine taking 4th in the overall standings.

=== Senior ===
Mulmina debuted as a Senior in the 2013 Season, she won the all-around bronze medal at the Ukrainian National Championships behind Viktoriia Mazur. On March 9–10, Mulmina competed at the Schmiden Gymnastik International 2013 (Internationales Turnier Fellbach-Schmiden), she qualified to 4 apparatus finals: she won bronze medal in ribbon and finished 5th in hoop, 4th in ball, 6th in clubs. In 2014, she competed at the Miss Valentine Cup finishing 9th in the all-around and won silver medal in ribbon final. On March 8–9, She finished 15th in the all-around at the 2014 Thiais Grand Prix. She competed at the 2014 World Cup series finishing 13th in the all-around in Lisboa, 35th in Pesaro and 32nd in Minsk. She finished 3rd in the all-around at the Ukrainian National Championships ahead of Eleonora Romanova.

In 2015, Mulmina started her season competing at the 2015 L.A. Lights finishing 9th in the all-around. On March 14–15, she competed at the 2015 Baltic Hoop finishing 9th in all-around. On March 28–29, she competed at the 2015 Dalia Kutkaite Cup finishing 2nd in the all-around ahead of Mariya Trubach. On May 15–16, Mulmina competed in senior International tournament at the Holon Grand Prix taking bronze in all-around, silver in ball and clubs final. She later began competing as a member of the Ukrainian Group. She was a member of the Ukrainian Group (with Oleksandra Gridasova, Olena Dmytrash, Valeriia Gudym, Yevgeniya Gomon) that competed at the 2015 Summer Universiade in Gwangju, South Korea. They won silver medals in Group all-around, 5 ribbons and a gold medal in 6 clubs + 2 hoops. Mulmina competed as an individual gymnast at the 2015 Ukrainian National Championships where she won the all-around bronze medal.
