= Olena Dzyubchuk =

Ukrainian rhythmic gymnast

- Full name: Olena Volodymyrivna Dzyubchuk
- Born: 19 May 1985 (age 41) Simferopol, Ukrainian SSR, Soviet Union
- Height: 179 cm (5 ft 10 in)

Gymnastics career
- Discipline: Rhythmic gymnastics
- Country represented: Ukraine; (2001–2004)
- Club: Deriugins School
- Head coach: Albina Deriugina
- Assistant coach: Irina Deriugina
Medal record
Group rhythmic gymnastics
Representing Ukraine
World Championships
| Gold medal – first place | 2001 Madrid | Team |
| Gold medal – first place | 2002 New Orleans | 5 ribbons |
European Championships
| Silver medal – second place | 2001 Geneva | 5 clubs |

Olena Dzyubchuk (born 19 May 1985) is a Ukrainian retired rhythmic gymnast.

== Personal life ==
Dzyubchuk was born on 19 May 1985, in the city of Simferopol. She was engaged in rhythmic gymnastics at the Dynamo Sports School in Simferopol. She trained under Lyubov Serebryanskaya, later under Oksana Rizatdinova. Later she joined the Deriugins school in Kyiv.

== Career ==
In 2001, as part of the Ukrainian team, she won the gold medal at the World Championship in Madrid in the team all-around.

In 2002, as part of the Ukrainian group, she won gold with 5 ribbons at the World Championships in New Orleans.

In 2004, Dzyubchuk competed at the Olympic Games in Athens as a member of the Ukrainian group. In the group all-around the Ukrainian team, which was also represented by Mariya Bilaya, Yuliya Chernova, Yelyzaveta Karabash, Inga Kozhokina and Oksana Paslas, took 9th place in qualification and did not reach the final. Ukraine scored 42.150 points and lost by 2.450 points the 8th and last place for the final to Spain.

== Competitive highlights ==
| Year | Event | Team | AA | Hoop | Ball | Clubs | Ribb. |
International
| 1999 | Aeon Cup | | 2nd J | | | | |
