= Maria Bila =

Ukrainian rhythmic gymnast

- Born: 4 January 1987 (age 39) Kharkiv, Ukrainian SSR, Soviet Union
- Height: 173 cm (5 ft 8 in)

Gymnastics career
- Discipline: Rhythmic gymnastics
- Country represented: Ukraine
- Club: Deriugins School
- Head coach: Albina Deriugina
- Assistant coach: Irina Deriugina
- Retired: yes

Maria Bila (born 4 January 1987) is a Ukrainian retired rhythmic gymnast.

She competed at the Olympic Games in Athens as a member of the Ukrainian group. In the group all-around the Ukrainian team, which was also represented by Olena Dzyubchuk, Yuliya Chernova, Yelyzaveta Karabash, Inga Kozhokina and Oksana Paslas, took 9th place in qualification and did not reach the final. Ukraine scored 42.150 points and lost by 2.450 points the 8th and last place for the final to Spain.
