= Olena Diachenko =

Ukrainian rhythmic gymnast

- Full name: Olena Ihorivna Diachenko
- Alternative name: Alyona Igorevna Dyachenko
- Nickname: Olenka
- Born: June 15, 2001 (age 25) Kyiv, Ukraine
- Height: 176 cm (5 ft 9 in)

Gymnastics career
- Discipline: Rhythmic gymnastics
- Country represented: Ukraine; (2014 - 2019)
- Club: Deriugins School
- Head coach: Irina Deriugina
- Assistant coach: Ireesha Blokhina
- Retired: 2020
- World ranking: 19 WC 18 WCC (2017 Season)
Medal record
Rhythmic gymnastics
Representing Ukraine
Grand Prix Final
Bronze medal – third place	2017 Eilat	Hoop
Bronze medal – third place	2017 Eilat	Ball
Summer Universiade
Silver medal – second place	2019 Naples	Group All-around
Silver medal – second place	2019 Naples	5 Balls
Silver medal – second place	2019 Naples	3 Hoops + 4 Clubs

Olena Ihorivna Diachenko (Ukrainian: Олена Ігорівна Д'яченко; born 15 June 2001) is a retired Ukrainian individual rhythmic gymnast. She is the two-time (2015–16) Ukrainian Junior National champion.

== Career ==
=== Junior ===
Diachenko began appearing in international junior competitions in 2013. In 2015 season, she competed in numerous Junior World Cup events in Lisbon, Budapest, Pesaro, Sofia. Diachenko along with seniors Ganna Rizatdinova and Viktoria Mazur competed at the annual 2015 Aeon Cup where Team Deriugins School won the silver and with Diachenko finishing 7th in junior individual all-around finals.

In 2016 season, Diachenko started her season competing at the 2016 L.A Lights followed by competition at the 2016 Valentine Cup in Tartu, Estonia. She then competed at the Junior World Cup events in Pesaro, Guadalajara, Budapest, Sofia. Diachenko repeated as the Ukrainian Junior National champion. At the 2016 European Junior Championships Diachenko finished 6th with Team Ukraine; she qualified to 3 individual finals finishing 7th in hoop, 6th in clubs and 8th in ball. On September 9–11, Diachenko together with seniors Ganna Rizatdinova and Viktoria Mazur represented team Deriugina school at the annual 2016 Aeon Cup in Tokyo, where they won the team bronze and with Diachenko finishing 4th in the junior individual all-around.

=== Senior ===
Diachenko appeared in her first senior international competition at the Miss Valentine Cup finishing 4th in the all-around. On March 17–19, Diachenko competed at the Kyiv Grand Prix finishing 7th in the all-around. Her next competition was at Thiais Grand Prix where she finished 11th in the all-around. On March 31 - April 2, Diacehnko then competed at the 2017 Grand Prix Marbella finishing 11th in the all-around and qualified to 2 apparatus final. Diachenko appeared in her first World Cup event at the 2017 Pesaro World Cup where she finished 19th in the all-around. She then competed at the 2017 Tashkent World Cup finishing 14th in the all-around and qualified to the ball final. Her next competition was at the 2017 Baku World Cup where she finished 10th in the all-around. On May 19–21, Diachenko along with teammates Viktoria Mazur and Yeva Meleshchuk represented the individual seniors for Ukraine at the 2017 European Championships. On June 23–25, Diachenko competed at the 2017 Grand Prix Holon finishing 7th in the all-around. On July 7–9, Diachenko finished 6th in the all-around behind Sabina Ashirbayeva at the 2017 Berlin World Challenge Cup, she qualified in ball final finishing in 6th and won her first World Cup medal, a bronze in hoop. Diachenko competed at the quadrennial held 2017 World Games in Wrocław, Poland from July 20–30, however she did not advance to any of the apparatus finals. On August 5–7, Duachenko finished 9th in the all-around at the 2017 Minsk World Challenge Cup, she qualified in 2 apparatus finals finishing 4th in hoop and 8th in ball. On August 30 - September 3, at the 2017 World Championships in Pesaro, Italy; Diachenko finished 19th in the all-around finals.

In 2018, On March 15–18, Diachenko started the season competing at the 2018 Kyiv Grand Prix where she finished 10th in the all-around. On March March 24–25; she then finished 15th in the all-around at the 2018 Thiais Grand Prix. On April 7–8, she competed at the RG Tournament Irina Cup in Warsaw, Poland where she finished 4th in the all-around. On April 27–29, Diachenko then competed in World Cup event at the 2018 Baku World Cup where she won finished 13th in the all-around. On May 16–17, Diachenko competed at the 2018 Holon Grand Prix finishing 13th in the all-around, she qualified in 2 apparatus finals finishing 6th in hoop and 9th in ribbon.

She retired from competition and became a coach in China, at 2020. Her most notable student is the olympic gymnast Wang Zilu.

== Routine music information ==
Year	Apparatus	Music title
2019
2019	Hoop	Escape from Slavery by PP Music
2019	Ball	I Will Always Love You by Whitney Houston
2019	Clubs	Represent Cuba (Feat. Heather Hadley) by Orishas
2019	Ribbon	Romani Holiday (Antonius Remix) by Hans Zimmer
2018
2018	Hoop	Pulling a Thread by The Chamber Orchestra of London and Andrew Skeet
2018	Ball	I Will Always Love You by Whitney Houston
2018	Clubs	Represent Cuba (Feat. Heather Hadley) by Orishas
2018	Ribbon	Romani Holiday (Antonius Remix) by Hans Zimmer
2017
2017	Hoop (first)	E.T. by Katy Perry ft. Kanye West
2017	Hoop (second)	Rising Above by Adam Drake, Tom Jenkins
2017	Ball	Hello by Adele
2017	Clubs	Capriccio Espagnol by Nikolai Rimsky-Korsakov
2017	Ribbon	Codigo de Barra by Bajofondo
2016
2016	Rope	Chandelier (Piano Version) by Sia
2016	Hoop	Obertura by Forever Tango
2016	Ball	Clair de Lune by Charles Gerhardt, National Philharmonic Orchestra & Skaila Kanga
2016	Clubs	Voces del Danubio by Luis Cobos
