= Viktoria Mazur =

Ukrainian rhythmic gymnast (born 1994)

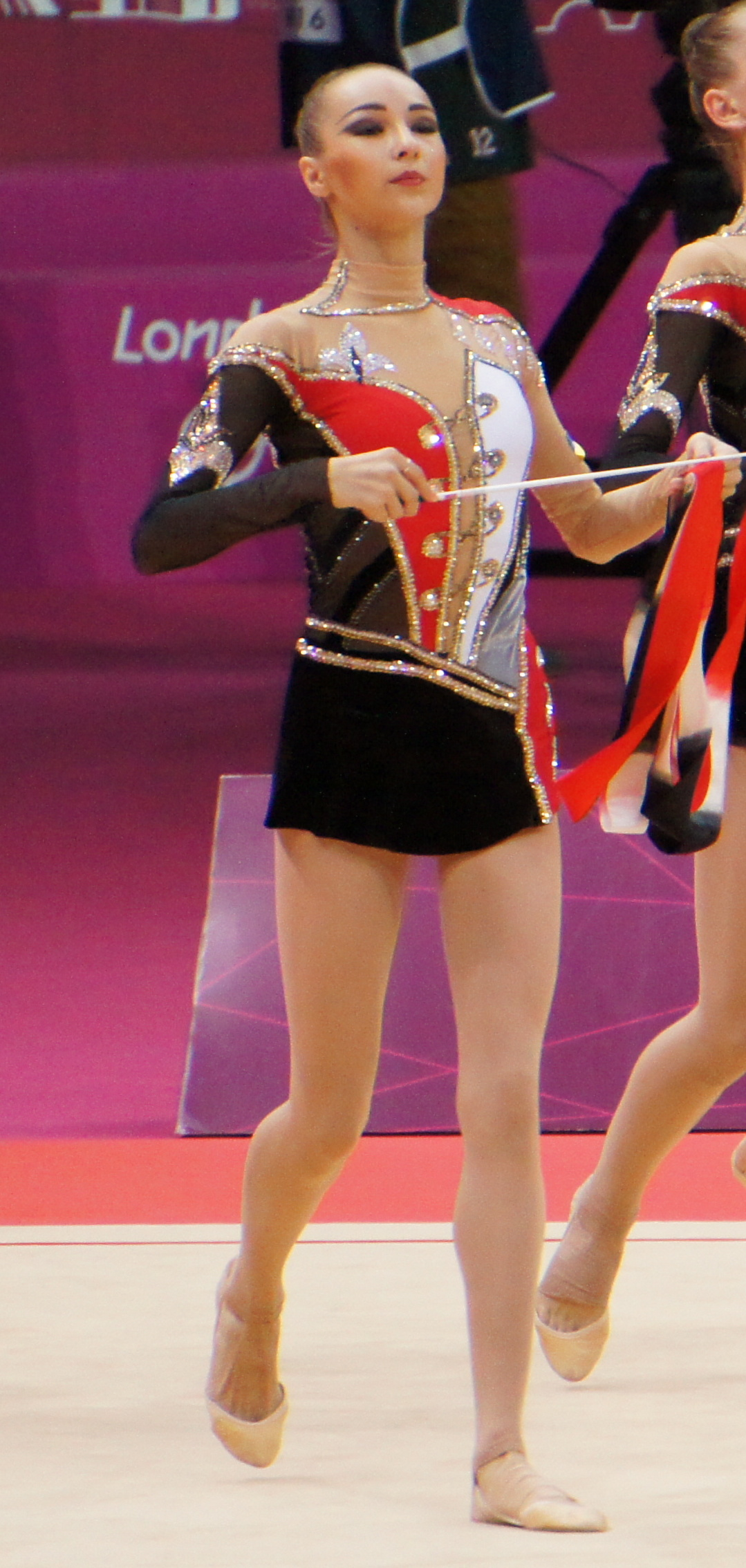

Personal information
- Full name: Viktoria Oleksiivna Mazur
- Alternative name: Viktoriia Mazur
- Nickname: Vika
- Born: 15 October 1994 (age 32) Luhansk, Ukraine
- Height: 169 cm (5 ft 7 in)

Gymnastics career
- Discipline: Rhythmic gymnastics
- Country represented: Ukraine; (2008-2017)
- Club: Deriugina school
- Head coach: Albina Deriugina
- Assistant coach: Irina Deriugina
- Choreographer: Irina Grischenko
- Retired: yes
- World ranking: 18 WC 36 WCC (2017 Season); 23 (2016 Season); 22 (2015 Season); 16 (2014 season); 22 (2013 Season); 40 (2012 Season); 24 (2011 Season)
Medal record
Representing Ukraine
Rhythmic Gymnastics
World Championships
| Bronze medal – third place | 2011 Montpellier | Team |
| Bronze medal – third place | 2013 Kyiv | 10 Clubs |
| Bronze medal – third place | 2014 Izmir | Team |
| Bronze medal – third place | 2015 Stuttgart | Team |
European Championships
| Silver medal – second place | 2013 Vienna | Team |
| Bronze medal – third place | 2015 Minsk | Team |
Junior European Championships
| Bronze medal – third place | 2008 Torino | Team |
Summer Universiade
| Silver medal – second place | 2013 Kazan | Group All-around |
| Bronze medal – third place | 2013 Kazan | 10 Clubs |
| Bronze medal – third place | 2013 Kazan | 2 Ribbon + 3 Balls |
Gymnasiade
| Silver medal – second place | 2009 Doha | Team |

Viktoria Oleksiivna Mazur (Ukrainian: Вікторія Олексіївна Мазур; born 15 October 1994) is a retired Ukrainian rhythmic gymnast who competed in individual and group rhythmic gymnastics.

== Career ==
Mazur began competing on the international junior level in 2007. At the 2008 European Junior Championships she was a member of the bronze medal-winning Team Ukraine.

Mazur debuted as a senior in 2010. She competed at her first World Championships in 2011 in Montpellier, France, where Team Ukraine won the bronze medal. She was a member of the Ukrainian group that competed at the 2012 London Olympics and finished fifth in all-around.

In 2013, Mazur was eighth at the Moscow Grand Prix behind Azeri gymnast Marina Durunda. At the Holon Grand Prix senior international division, she won the bronze medal in all-around. She competed at the 2013 European Championships and together with Ganna Rizatdinova and Alina Maksymenko won Ukraine the Team silver medal. She also qualified for the hoop final and finished seventh. Mazur returned to competing with the Ukrainian Group at the 2013 Summer Universiade, winning the silver in Group all-around and bronze medals in 10 clubs and 2 ribbon / 3 balls. Mazur, together with Maksymenko and Rizatdinova, appeared in an editorial on the 2013 August edition of Ukraine Vogue. She was a member of the Ukrainian group that won bronze in 10 Clubs at the 2013 World Championships in Kyiv, Ukraine. At the World Club Championship, the 2013 Aeon Cup in Tokyo, Mazur competed with Rizatdinova and junior Eleonora Romanova and won the team silver representing the Deriugins School.

In 2014, Mazur started her season competing at the 2014 L.A. Lights, she then competed at the 2014 Miss Valentine Cup in Tartu, Estonia, she became 2014 "Miss Valentine" and the winner of the individual all-around. she also won the gold medal in ball final. She competed at the 2014 Debrecen World Cup finishing 9th in the all-around and won her first World Cup medal, a silver medal in hoop final. Mazur finished a distant 23rd in the all-around at the 2014 Stuttgart World Cup after a series of multiple mistakes from all her apparatus routines. Mazur then competed at the 2014 Holon Grand Prix where she finished 6th in all-around, she qualified to 4 event finals and won bronze medal in hoop. Mazur finished 9th in all-around at the 2014 Lisboa World Cup. On 9–11 May Mazur competed at the 2014 Corbeil-Essonnes World Cup and finished 29th in all-around. On 10–15 June Mazur competed at the 2014 European Championships and finished 14th in all-around. On 8–10 August Mazur competed at the 2014 Sofia World Cup finishing 15th in all-around and placed 7th in hoop finals. On 22–28 September Mazur, along with teammates Ganna Rizatdinova and Eleonora Romanova, represented Ukraine at the 2014 World Championships where they took the Team bronze with a total of 135.515 points. Mazur finished 18th in the all-around finals.

In 2015 Season, Mazur's first competition was at the 2015 L.A. Lights where she finished 4th in the all-around. She finished 4th in all-around at the 2015 Valentine Cup and won silver in clubs, bronze in ribbon. On 21–22 March Mazur competed at the 2015 Thiais Grand Prix finishing 16th in the all-around. On 27–29 March Mazur came 22nd in the all-around at the 2015 Lisboa World Cup. Mazur with teammates (Ganna Rizatdinova, Eleonora Romanova) competed at the 2015 European Championships where Team Ukraine won bronze. In July, Mazur finished 11th in the all-around at the 2015 Summer Universiade. In August, Mazur then competed at the 2015 Ukrainian National Championships where she won the all-around silver medal behind Ganna Rizatdinova. At the 2015 Budapest World Cup, Mazur finished 10th in all-around, her highest all-around placement for the 2015 Season. On 9–13 September Mazur, together with teammates Ganna Rizatdinova and Eleonora Romanova, competed at the 2015 World Championships in Stuttgart, with Team Ukraine taking bronze. Mazur qualified to the all-around finals finishing in 22nd place. On 2–4 October Mazur, together with teammates Ganna Rizatdinova and junior Olena Diachenko, represented Team Deriugins School at the 2015 Aeon Cup in Tokyo Japan, Mazur finished 9th in the individual all-around finals behind Italian Veronica Bertolini and with team Ukraine taking silver in the overall standings.

In 2016 Season, Mazur started her competitions at the 2016 Valentine Cup in Tartu, Estonia where she won silver in hoop, ball and bronze in ribbon. On 26–28 February Mazur competed at the 2016 Espoo World Cup finishing 14th in the all-around. On 17–20 March Mazur competed at the 2016 Lisboa World Cup where she finished 11th in the all-around and qualified to ball final. At the 30th Thiais Grand Prix event in Paris, she finished 13th in the all-around. On 1–3 April she competed at the 2016 Pesaro World Cup where she finished 16th in the all-around. On 6–8 May Mazur competed at the Brno Grand Prix where she finished 10th in the all-around. On 27–29 May Mazur then finished 14th in the all-around at the 2016 Sofia World Cup. On 3–5 June Mazur finished 13th in the all-around at the 2016 Guadalajara World Cup with a total of 69.550 points. On 17–19 June Mazur then competed at the 2016 European Championships where she finished in 16th place. On 1–3 July Mazur competed at the 2016 Berlin World Cup finishing 10th in the all-around. On 9–11 September Mazur together with teammates Ganna Rizatdinova and junior Olena Diachenko represented team Deriugina school at the annual 2016 Aeon Cup in Tokyo, where they won the team bronze and with Mazur finishing 14th in the all-around.

In 2017, Mazur started the post-Olympics season competing at the Miss Valentine Cup, where she won the all-around gold with a total of 64.750 points. On 17–19 March Mazur competed at the Kyiv Grand Prix finishing 5th in the all-around. On 24–26 March Mazur competed at the Thiais Grand Prix finishing 6th in the all-around, she qualified to 3 event finals taking silver in ball, placed 5th in hoop and 8th in clubs. From 31 March to 2 April Mazur competed at the 2017 Grand Prix Marbella finishing 10th in the all-around and qualified to 2 apparatus final. On 7–9 April Mazur competed at the 2017 Pesaro World Cup finishing 12th in the all-around. Her next event, Mazur again finished 12th in the all-around at 2017 Tashkent World Cup. On 5–7 May Mazur competed at the 2017 Sofia World Cup finishing 11th in the all-around. On 19–21 May Mazur along with teammates Olena Diachenko and Yeva Meleschchuk represented the individual seniors for Ukraine at the 2017 European Championships, she qualified in 2 apparatus finals. Her next event at the 2017 World Challenge Cup Guadalajara, Mazur finished 11th the all-around, she qualified in 1 apparatus final in clubs and won the bronze medal - her first world cup medal. On 23–25 June Mazur competed at the 2017 Grand Prix Holon finishing 9th in the all-around. Mazur competed at the quadrennial held 2017 World Games in Wrocław, Poland from 20–30 July, qualifying in 3 apparatus finals but did not medal. From 30 August to 3 September, at the 2017 World Championships in Pesaro, Italy; Mazur finished 17th in the all-around finals. Shortly after Worlds, she announced her retirement.

== Music used for routines ==
| Year | Apparatus | Music Title |
|---|---|---|
| 2017 | Hoop | "Vidlik" by Onuka |
| 2017 | Ball | "Goldeneye" by Tina Turner |
| 2017 | Clubs | "Still Loving You" by Scorpions |
| 2017 | Ribbon | "Scared Money", "The House Always Wins", "Agent Shavers" by Christophe Beck |
| 2016 | Hoop (2nd) | "Swan Lake" performed by Tbilisi Symphony Orchestra |
| 2016 | Hoop (1st) | "Liebestraum" by Bert Landers |
| 2016 | Ball | Say Something by A Great Big World & Christina Aguilera |
| 2016 | Clubs | "The Drums Of War", "Take You Down" music from The Man from U.N.C.L.E. by Daniel Pemberton |
| 2016 | Ribbon (2nd) | "Catgroove" by Parov Stelar |
| 2016 | Ribbon (1st) | "Final Frontier" by Thomas Bergersen |
| 2015 | Hoop | "Liebestraum" by Bert Landers |
| 2015 | Ball | "Ty Rozhdena Trepat' Mne Nervy" by Log Dog |
| 2015 | Clubs | "The 2nd Law: Unsustainable" by Muse |
| 2015 | Ribbon | "Final Frontier" by Thomas Bergersen |
| 2014 | Hoop | "Man With the Hex" by Atomic Fireballs |
| 2014 | Ball | "Ty Rozhdena Trepat' Mne Nervy" by Log Dog |
| 2014 | Clubs (New) | "The 2nd Law: Unsustainable" by Muse |
| 2014 | Clubs (First) | "Sail (Glitch Hop Remix Mongoose)" by AWOLNATION |
| 2014 | Ribbon | "Francesca da Rimini, Op. 32" by Daniel Barenboim, Chicago Symphony Orchestra |

== Detailed Olympic results ==
| Year | Competition Description | Location | Music | Apparatus | Score-Final | Score-Qualifying |
|---|---|---|---|---|---|---|
| 2012 | Olympics | London | | Group All-around | 54.375 | 54.150 |
| 2012 | Olympics | London | Grand Guignol music from Mar Dulce by Bajofondo Tango Club | 5 Balls | 27.200 | 27.050 |
| 2012 | Olympics | London | Espana Cani / Espana Cani by Manhattan Pops Orchestra / Trio Norte | 3 Ribbons / 2 Hoops | 27.175 | 27.100 |
