= Inga Kozhokhina =

Ukrainian rhythmic gymnast

- Full name: Inha Andriïvna Kozhokhina
- Born: 26 January 1987 (age 39) Kharkiv, Ukrainian SSR, Soviet Union
- Height: 5 ft 6.5 in (169 cm)

Gymnastics career
- Discipline: Rhythmic gymnastics
- Country represented: Ukraine (2004-2005 (?))
- Club: Spartak
Medal record
Representing Ukraine
Group rhythmic gymnastics
Summer Universiade
Gold medal – first place	2007 Bangkok	5 Ropes
Silver medal – second place	2007 Bangkok	Group All-around

Inha Andriïvna Kozhokhina (Інга Андріївна Кожохіна, born 26 January 1987 in Kharkiv) is a Ukrainian group rhythmic gymnast representing her nation at international competitions.

She participated at the 2004 Summer Olympics in the all-around event together with Maria Bila, Yulia Chernova, Olena Dzyubchuk, Yelyzaveta Karabash and Oksana Paslas finishing 9th. She competed at world championships, including at the 2005 World Rhythmic Gymnastics Championships.
