= Oksana Paslas =

Ukrainian rhythmic gymnast

- Born: 6 June 1986 (age 40) Lviv, Ukrainian SSR, Soviet Union
- Height: 5 ft 4 in (163 cm)

Gymnastics career
- Discipline: Rhythmic gymnastics
- Country represented: Ukraine (2004-2005 (?))

Oksana Paslas (Оксана Паслась; born 6 June 1986) was a Ukrainian group rhythmic gymnast representing her nation at international competitions.

She participated at the 2004 Summer Olympics in the all-around event together with Maria Bila, Yulia Chernova, Olena Dzyubchuk, Yelyzaveta Karabash and Inga Kozhokhina finishing 9th. She competed at world championships, including at the 2005 World Rhythmic Gymnastics Championships.
