= Ukrainian Federation of Rhythmic Gymnastics =

Sports governing body in Ukraine

- Type: Rhythmic gymnastics
- Headquarters: Kyiv, Ukraine
- Region served: Ukraine
- Official language: Ukrainian
- President: Albina Deriuhina
- Vice-President: Irina Deriugina
- Affiliations: (Europe)
- Website: ukraine-rg.com.ua

Ukrainian Federation of Rhythmic Gymnastics is a national governing body of rhythmic gymnastics in Ukraine.

In Ukraine the sport is known rather as Artistic Gymnastics (Ukrainian: Художня гімнастика).

The major training center is the Deriugins School of Gymnastics in Kyiv.

== See also ==
- Deriugins School
