= Eleonora Romanova =

Ukrainian-Russian rhythmic gymnast (born 1998)

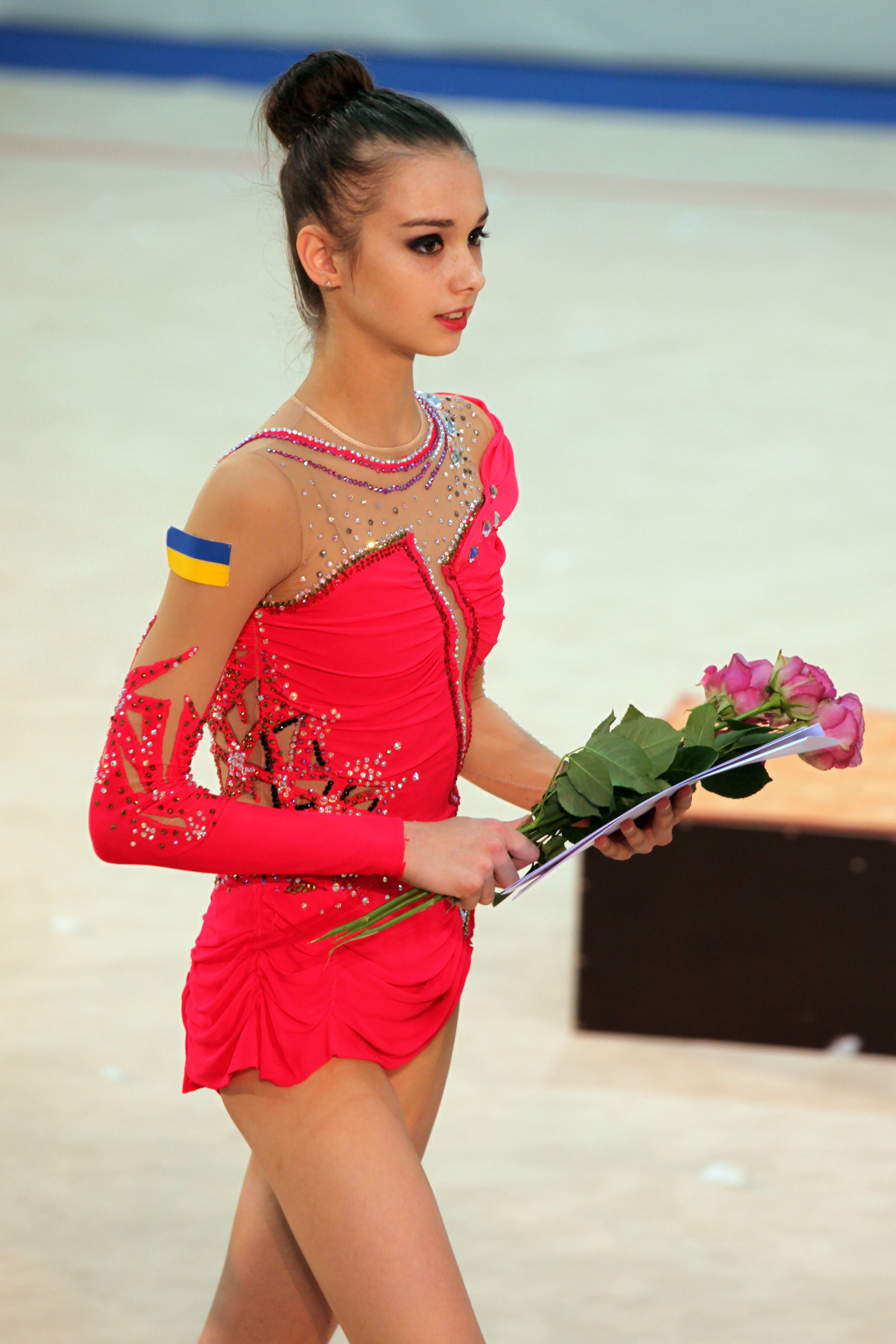
- Romanova at the 2014 Grand Prix Final

Personal information
- Full name: Eleonora Alekseevna Romanova
- Alternative name: Eleonora Oleksiivna Romanova
- Nickname: Elya
- Born: 17 August 1998 (age 28) Krasnodon, Luhansk region
- Height: 178 cm (5 ft 10 in)

Gymnastics career
- Discipline: Rhythmic gymnastics
- Country represented: Russia
- Former countries represented: Ukraine
- Gym: Novogorsk
- Head coach: Irina Viner
- Assistant coach: Evgenia Kanaeva
- Former coach: Irina Deriugina
- World ranking: 20 (2015 Season); 50 (2014 season)
Medal record
Representing Ukraine
Rhythmic Gymnastics
World Championships
Bronze medal – third place	2014 Izmir	Team
Bronze medal – third place	2015 Stuttgart	Team
European Championships
Bronze medal – third place	2015 Minsk	Team

Eleonora Alekseevna Romanova (Russian: Элеоно́ра Алексе́евна Рома́нова; Ukrainian: Елеонора Олексіївна Романова, born 17 August 1998) is a Russian (since September 2016) and former Ukrainian individual rhythmic gymnast. She is the 2013 Ukrainian national junior champion.

== Career ==
=== Junior ===
Romanova began appearing in international junior competitions in the 2011 Season. She won team silver at the 2012 Kyiv World Cup. Romanova together with teammate Anastasiia Mulmina competed at the 2012 European Junior Championships, she qualified to 2 event finals (6th in hoop and 8th in ribbon).

In 2013 Season, Romanova started her season competing at the 2013 Moscow Grand Prix where she won the all-around silver medal behind Russia's Yulia Bravikova. She won the all-around bronze at the 2013 Irina Deleanu Cup and won the Ukrainian National Junior championships. Romanova briefly competed as member of the Ukrainian group that competed at the 2013 European Junior Championships in Vienna, Austria. On October 25–27, Romanova competed at the World Club Championship, the 2013 Aeon Cup in Tokyo, Japan representing team Deriugina school where she won the junior all-around bronze medal and (together with Senior teammates Ganna Rizatdinova and Viktoria Mazur) won the team bronze.

=== Senior ===
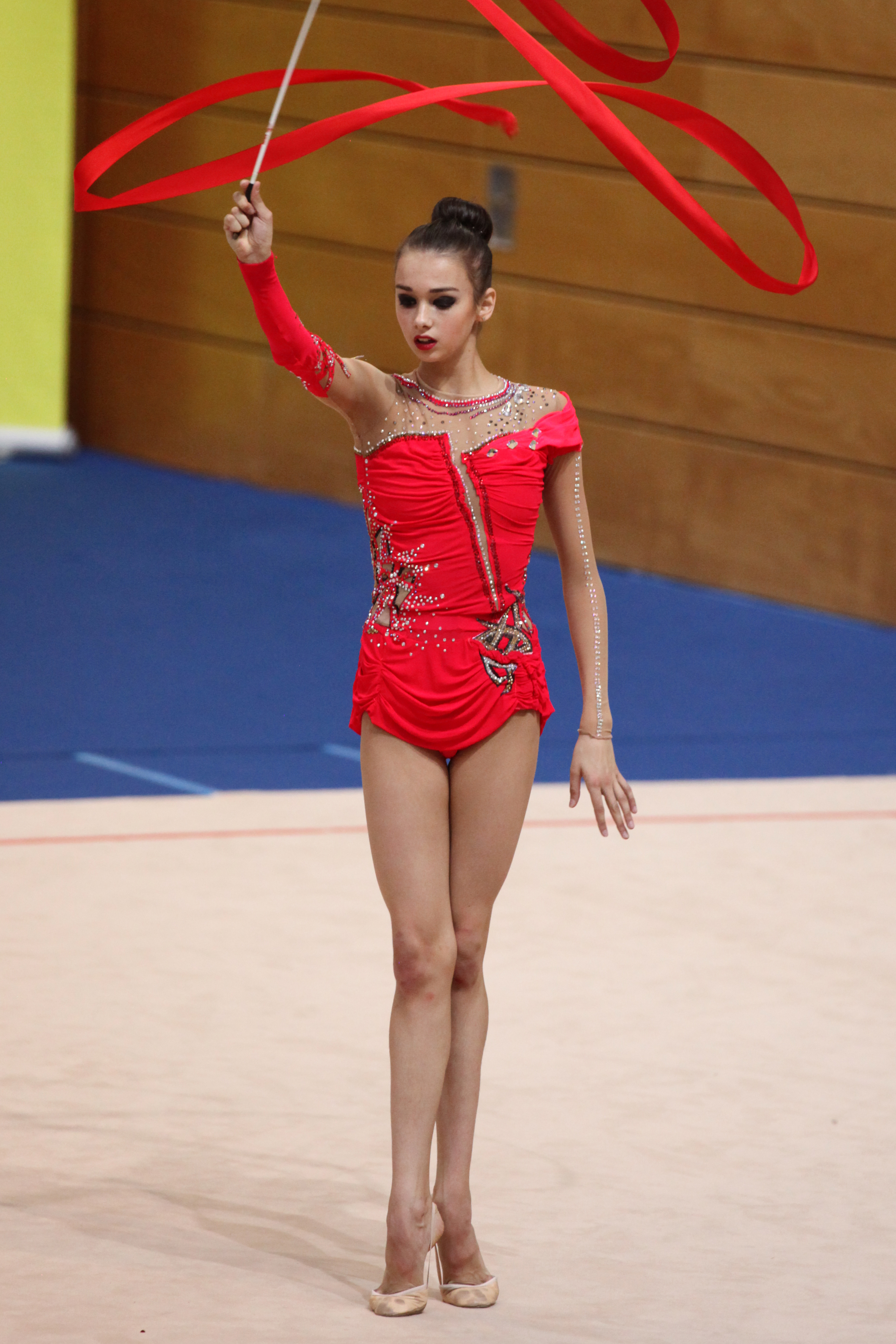
Romanova at the 2014 Grand Prix Final

In 2014 Season, Romanova competed in the senior international division at the 2014 Holon Grand Prix finishing 7th in all-around, she qualified to 2 event finals (bronze in ball, 7th in hoop). Romanova appeared in her first World Cup assignment at the 2014 Minsk World Cup finishing 18th in all-around and went to qualify in the clubs final. She finished 4th in all-around at the Ukrainian National Championships behind Anastasiia Mulmina. On September 22–28, Romanova (along with teammates Ganna Rizatdinova and Viktoria Mazur) represented Ukraine at the 2014 World Championships where they took the Team bronze with a total of 135.515 points. On October 17–19, Romanova traveled in Tokyo for the 2014 Aeon Cup, representing team Deriugina school club (together with teammates Ganna Rizatdinova and junior Mariia Mulyk) won the team bronze. She finished 9th in the All-around finals behind Azerbaijan's Marina Durunda. Romanova competed at the 2014 Grand Prix Final in Innsbruck where she finished 6th in all-around. She qualified to all 4 event finals, finishing 6th in hoop, clubs, ribbon and 5th in ball.

In 2015 Season, Romanova's first competition was at the 2015 L.A. Lights where she finished 5th in the all-around. At the 2015 Valentine Cup, she won bronze medals in the all around, hoop, ball and placed 4th in clubs and ribbon. On March 14–15, Romanova competed at the 2015 Baltic Hoop finishing 5th in all-around, she took silver in ball and bronze in hoop finals. On March 27–29, Romanova competed at the 2015 Lisboa World Cup finishing 11th in the all-around. On April 10–12, Romanova finished 16th in the all-around at the 2015 Pesaro World Cup. Romanova with teammates (Ganna Rizatdinova, Viktoria Mazur) competed at the 2015 European Championships where Team Ukraine won bronze. Romanova competed at the 2015 Holon Grand Prix finishing 12th in all-around and qualified to 1 event final. On June 15–21, Romanova competed at the inaugural 2015 European Games where she finished 16th in the all-around. In August, Romanova finished 18th in the all-around at the 2015 Sofia World Cup behind Varvara Filiou. On September 9–13, Romanova (together with teammates Ganna Rizatdinova and Viktoria Mazur) competed at the 2015 World Championships in Stuttgart, with Team Ukraine taking bronze. Romanova also dramatically qualifies to the individual all-around finals (0,008 points ahead of Viktoria Mazur), but misses it due to the foot injury (she was substituted by Viktoria Mazur).

In February 2016, Romanova unexpectedly disappeared from the Deriugina School of Rhythmic Gymnastics and the Ukrainian Rhythmic Gymnastics National Team (which led to a scandal in the Ukrainian RG Federation). The Ukrainian media said that parents took her away from Ukraine and that she allegedly decided to change her nationality to compete for the Russian Federation. However, in late 2016 it was confirmed that Romanova was granted Russian citizenship. Romanova is currently trained by Evgenia Kanaeva, and was originally set to compete for Russia in 2017 - however, since Ukraine disagreed with letting her change nationality, Romanova is to wait until 2018 when her current FIG License expires before she is allowed to compete for Russia where she will renew her FIG License.

== Routine music information ==
Year	Apparatus	Music title
2015	Ball	Seven Nation Army By The White Stripes
2015	Hoop	Theme From Love Story by 101 Strings Orchestra
2015	Clubs	Dance Of The Comedians by The Manhattan Pops Orchestra
2015	Ribbon	Grand Guignol by Bajofondo
2014	Ball	Seven Nation Army By The White Stripes
2014	Hoop	Do You Only Wanna Dance by Julio Daviel Big Band (Conducted By Ángel Peña)
2014	Clubs	Sweet Dreams (Cazette Mix, Scott Remedy Edit) by Tanghetto, Avicii
2014	Ribbon	Pa'Bailar by Bajofondo
2013	Ball	Angry Birds Main Theme By London Philharmonic Orchestra, Andrew Skeet
2013	Hoop	Do You Only Wanna Dance by Julio Daviel Big Band (Conducted By Ángel Peña)
2013	Clubs	?
2013	Ribbon	Pa'Bailar by Bajofondo

== Competitive Highlights ==
International: Senior
Year	Event	AA	Team	Hoop	Ball	Clubs	Ribbon
2015	World Championships	25th (Q)	3rd		18th (Q)	29th (Q)	26th (Q)
2015	Sofia World Cup	18th		18th (Q)	13th (Q)	23rd (Q)	17th (Q)
2015	MTK Budapest Cup	7th		4th	5th	10th (Q)	19th (Q)
2015	European Games	16th		16th (Q)	19th (Q)	12th (Q)	15th (Q)
2015	Holon Grand Prix	12th		15th (Q)	12th (Q)	7th	13th (Q)
2015	European Championships		3rd	26th (Q)	9th (Q)		10th (Q)
2015	Pesaro World Cup	16th		11th (Q)	10th (Q)	14th (Q)	19th (Q)
2015	Lisboa World Cup	11th		15th (Q)	9th (Q)	9th (Q)	19th (Q)
2015	Baltic Hoop	5th		3rd	2nd	5th	6th
2015	Valentine Cup	3rd		3rd	3rd	4th	4th
2015	2015 L.A. Lights	5th	3rd				
2014	Grand Prix Final	6th		6th	5th	6th	6th
2014	2014 Aeon Cup	9th	3rd				
2014	World Championships		3rd	22nd (Q)	27th (Q)		
2014	Sofia World Cup	23rd		33rd (Q)	17th (Q)	13th (Q)	23rd (Q)
2014	Minsk World Cup	18th		25th (Q)	12th (Q)	8th	29th (Q)
2014	Grand Prix Holon	7th		3rd	7th		
International: Junior
Year	Event	AA	Team	Hoop	Ball	Clubs	Ribbon
2013	Aeon Cup	3rd	3rd				
2013	Bucharest World Cup	3rd		5th	6th	2nd	2nd
2013	Lisboa World Cup		5th	3rd	2nd		
2013	Grand Prix Moscow	2nd					
2012	European Junior Championships		4th	6th			8th
2012	Spring Cup		1st	1st	1st	1st	2nd
2012	International Tournament of Benidorm		1st				
2012	Kyiv World Cup		2nd	2nd			3rd
National
Year	Event	AA	Team	Ball	Ribbon	Hoop	Clubs
2015	Ukrainian Championships	WD					
2014	Ukrainian Championships	4th					
2013	Ukrainian Junior Championships	1st					
2012	Ukrainian Junior Championships	2nd					
Q = Qualifications (Did not advance to Event Final due to the 2 gymnast per country rule, only Top 8 highest score); WD = Withdrew; NT = No Team Competition

== See also ==
- Nationality changes in gymnastics
