= Samira Mustafaeva =

Russian/Azerbaijani rhythmic gymnast

Samira Arastunovna Mustafaeva
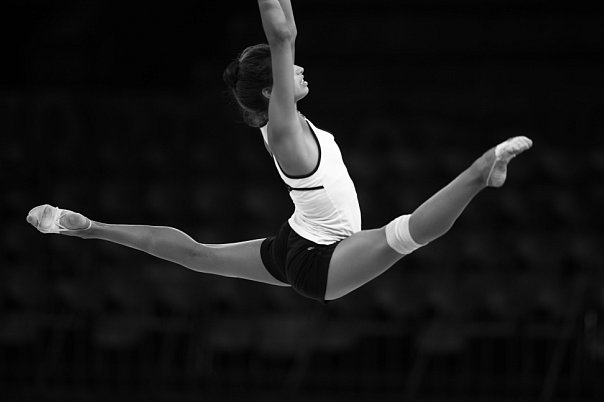

Personal information
- Born: January 15, 1993 (age 33) Saint-Petersburg, Russia

Samira Arastunovna Mustafaeva (Russian: Мустафаева Самира Арастуновна, born January 15, 1993, in Saint-Petersburg) is a Russian and Azerbaijani rhythmic gymnast. She is a multiple time medalist of the World Team Championships, a champion in St. Petersburg, “Master of Sport” in Russia, and a world-class gymnast according to FIG. She was part of the national team of Azerbaijan, and later became part of the Russian national team. She retired from her career in professional rhythmic gymnastics in 2013.

== Rhythmic gymnastics career ==
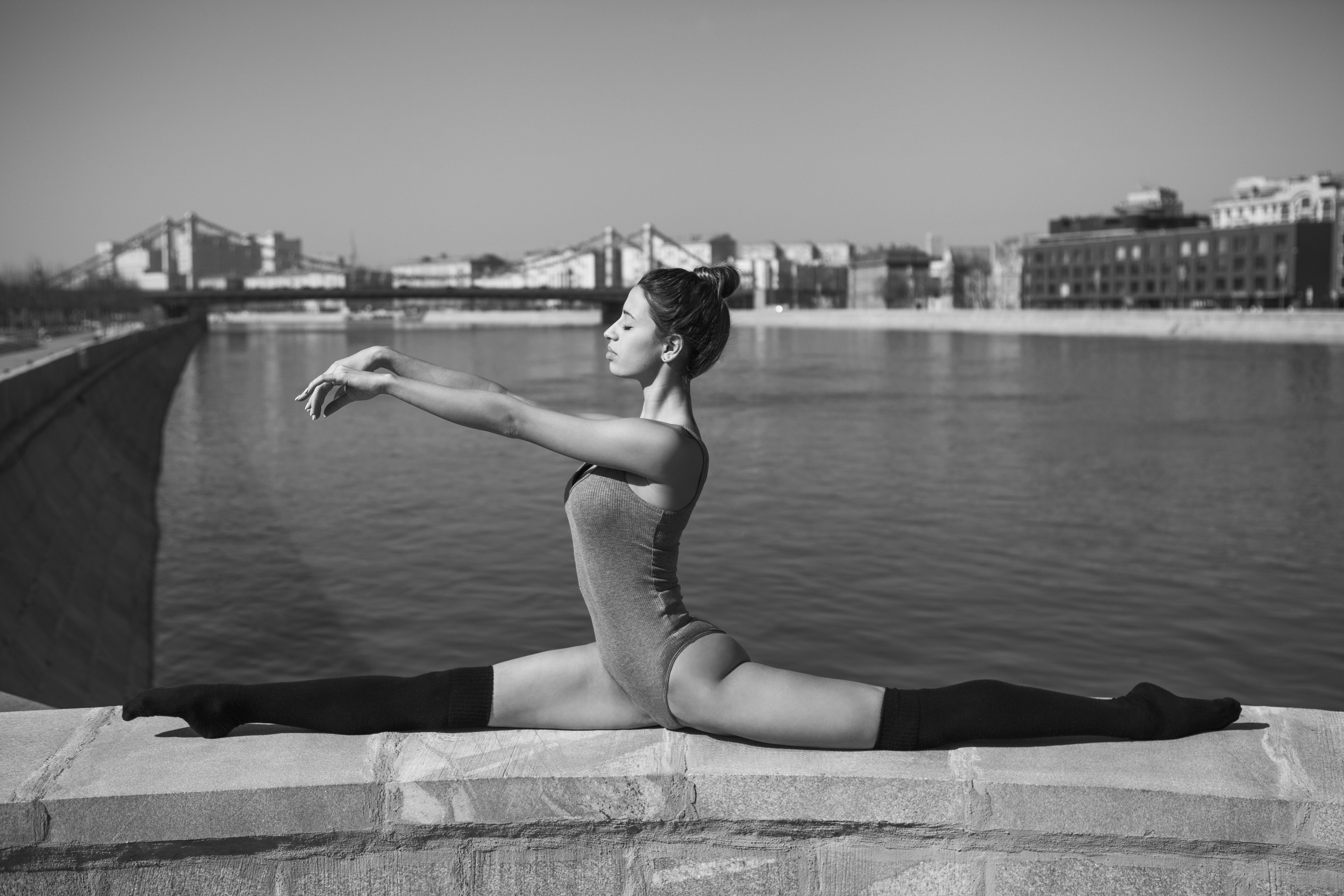
Mustafaeva in Moscow

Samira Mustafaeva was born in Saint-Petersburg, on January 15, 1993. She graduated from Lesgaft National State University of Physical Education, Sport and Health, St. Petersburg. She was introduced to the sport when she was 5 years old. In 2006, at the Olympics, she was noticed by the Russian National team coach, Zaripova Amina Vasilovna. Mustafaeva was invited to the training camp in Moscow in the Olympic village for two weeks. Based on her skills shown there, she was then invited to continue training in Moscow.

The turning point in her career occurred in 2007, after meeting with I. A. Viner-Usmanova in Novogorsk. Mustafaeva began to represent the National team of Azerbaijan, participate in the World Cup, as well as the World and European Championships. During this time Mustafaeva became a double bronze medalist amongst her club in the 2008 AEON Cup in Japan, in team and individual competitions.

In 2008, Samira Mustafayeva won two silver medals with separate apparatuses (hoop and ball) at a competition in Chieti, Italy.

In 2009, she won the bronze of the World Cup in Japan (team all-round) and bronze medal during the international tournament in Slovakia (ribbon) and won a medal together with Byelorussian and Russian gymnasts in the central sports complex of Bratislava. Mustafaeva also earned a bronze medal at the world Cup in Moscow (2010, team all-round).

In 2012, Mustafaeva began to compete for the Saint Petersburg National team in group exercises under the guidance of Bystrova Inna Valentinovna. She joined the national team of Azerbaijan and later, the Russian national team. In 2012, she became a rhythmic gymnastics champion of Russia (ball).

In 2013, she retired from her career in professional sports. Today, Mustafaeva is the founder of SMSTRETCHING, which has five fitness studios in Moscow and one in Los Angeles.

== Rhythmic gymnastic achievements ==
- 2008, Tokio, Japan, AEON Cup. Juniors, Individual All-around, Junior - bronze, team all-round - bronze;
- 2009, Mie, Japan, World Rhythmic Gymnastics Championships, team all-round - bronze;
- 2010, Moscow, Russia, World Rhythmic Gymnastics Championships, team all-round - bronze;
- 2012, Kazan, Russia, Russian Rhythmic Gymnastics Championship. Group exercise. Group all-around-bronze. Apparatus finals: gold (ball); bronze (Hoop, ribbon).
- 2012, Vitoria, Brazil, International Rhythmic Gymnastics Competition. All-around - gold. Apparatus finals: gold (ball); gold (hoop, ribbon);
- 2013, Kazan, Russia, Russian Rhythmic Gymnastics Championship. Group exercise. Apparatus finals: silver (clubs).
