= Aeon Cup =

Rhythmic gymnastics competition

ÆON CUP
- Genre: sporting event
- Frequency: annual
- Locations: Tokyo, Japan
- Inaugurated: 1994

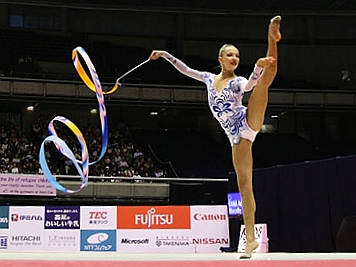
Melitina Staniouta at the 2008 Aeon Cup

The Aeon Cup (stylized as ÆON CUP; Japanese: イオンカップ), also known as the Worldwide Rhythmic Gymnastics Club Championships (世界新体操クラブ選手権), is an international rhythmic gymnastics competition hosted by the Japanese Rhythmic Gymnastics Federation.

== History ==
The event was founded in 1994 and takes its name from its sponsor, Aeon Co., Ltd. The president of Aeon (then Jusco) at the time proposed the event to promote "peace through sports". Athletes from both Serbia and Bosnia shook hands with each other during the inaugural event despite the ongoing Yugoslav Wars.

The event format has varied over time; for example, the 2000 Aeon Cup used a knockout format with four rounds of competition.

The event paused for two years due to the COVID-19 pandemic.

== Format ==
The Aeon Cup is contested between rhythmic gymnastics clubs from different countries. No flags or national anthems are featured at the award ceremony. Japan enters two clubs.

Each team includes two senior and one junior gymnasts. In addition to a club title, two all-around titles (a senior and a junior) are awarded. The top club of the Japanese Rhythmic Gymnastics Club Championships, as well as the clubs representing the same federations as the top 5 clubs the previous year, move directly to the finals, while all other gymnasts participate in qualifications. Another three club teams, four seniors, and two juniors qualify to the final round. Prize money is paid to the top three clubs and the top six senior individuals.

A portion of the event's proceeds are donated to the United Nations High Commissioner for Refugees.

== Times and venue ==
Tokyo Metropolitan Gymnasium entrance

The tournament is held annually at the Tokyo Metropolitan Gymnasium.

== Reception ==
According to TV Asahi, the Aeon Cup is regarded as one of the three major global rhythmic gymnastics competitions, alongside the World Rhythmic Gymnastics Championships and the European Championships.

== Results ==
=== Club medalists ===
Ed.	Year	Venue	Gold	Silver	Bronze	Ref.
1	1994	Tokyo; Metropolitan; Gymnasium				
2	1995	Tokyo; Metropolitan; Gymnasium	(Bulgaria) Levski	(Belarus) Dynamo Minsk	(Russia) Intercross	
3	1996	Tokyo; Metropolitan; Gymnasium	(Russia) Intercross	(Bulgaria) Levski	(Belarus) Dynamo Minsk	
4	1997	Tokyo; Metropolitan; Gymnasium	(Russia) Interfin	(Ukraine) Gratsi	(Bulgaria) Levski	
5	1998	Tokyo; Metropolitan; Gymnasium	(Belarus) Dynamo Minsk	(Russia) Interfin	(Ukraine) Derugina School	
6	1999	Tokyo; Metropolitan; Gymnasium	(Russia) Gazprom	(Belarus) Dynamo Minsk		
7	2000	Tokyo; Metropolitan; Gymnasium	(Russia) Gazprom	(Russia) MGFSO	(Belarus) Dynamo Minsk	
8	2001	Tokyo; Metropolitan; Gymnasium	(Russia) Gazprom	(Ukraine) Derugina School	(Belarus) Dynamo Minsk	
9	2002	Tokyo; Metropolitan; Gymnasium	(Russia) Gazprom	(Ukraine) Derugina School	(Belarus) Dynamo Minsk	
10	2003	Tokyo; Metropolitan; Gymnasium	(Russia) Gazprom	(Belarus) Dynamo Minsk	(Ukraine) Derugina School	
11	2004	Tokyo; Metropolitan; Gymnasium	(Russia) Gazprom	(Ukraine) Derugina School	(Belarus) Dynamo Minsk	
12	2005	Tokyo; Metropolitan; Gymnasium	(Russia) Gazprom	(Ukraine) Derugina School	(Belarus) Dynamo Minsk	
13	2006	Sun Arena, Ise	(Russia) Gazprom	(Ukraine) Derugina School	(Belarus) Dynamo Minsk	
14	2007	Tokyo; Metropolitan; Gymnasium	(Russia) Gazprom	(Ukraine) Derugina School	(Belarus) Dynamo Minsk	
15	2008	Tokyo; Metropolitan; Gymnasium	(Russia) Gazprom	(Ukraine) Derugina School	(Bulgaria) SC Iliana	
16	2010	Tokyo; Metropolitan; Gymnasium	(Russia) Gazprom	(Belarus) Dynamo Minsk	(Ukraine) Derugina School	
17	2011	Tokyo; Metropolitan; Gymnasium	(Russia) Gazprom	(Belarus) Dynamo Minsk	(Ukraine) Derugina School	
18	2012	Yoyogi Nat'l Gym.	(Russia) Gazprom	(Belarus) Dynamo Minsk	(Ukraine) Derugina School	
19	2013	Tokyo; Metropolitan; Gymnasium	(Russia) Gazprom	(Belarus) Dynamo Minsk	(Ukraine) Derugina School	
20	2014	Tokyo; Metropolitan; Gymnasium	(Russia) Gazprom	(Belarus) Dynamo Minsk	(Ukraine) Derugina School	
21	2015	Tokyo; Metropolitan; Gymnasium	(Russia) Gazprom	(Ukraine) Derugina School	(Belarus) Dynamo Minsk	
22	2016	Tokyo; Metropolitan; Gymnasium	(Russia) Gazprom	(Belarus) Dynamo Minsk	(Ukraine) Derugina School	
23	2017	Tokyo; Metropolitan; Gymnasium	(Russia) Gazprom	(Uzbekistan) Garmonia Elite	(Japan) Aeon R.G. Club [ja]	
24	2018	Takasaki; Arena [ja]	(Russia) Gazprom	(Belarus) Dynamo Minsk	Team Israel	
25	2019	Takasaki; Arena [ja]	(Russia) Gazprom	(Ukraine) Derugina School	(Belarus) Dynamo Minsk	
26	2022	Tokyo; Metropolitan; Gymnasium	(Italy) S.G. Fabriano	(Ukraine) Derugina School	(United States) NSR/Burlo Club	
27	2023	Tokyo; Metropolitan; Gymnasium	(Germany) TSV Schmiden	(Ukraine) Derugina School	Team Israel	
28	2024	Tokyo; Metropolitan; Gymnasium	(United States) Burlo/Pacific Club	(Ukraine) Derugina School	(Italy) Ginnastica Fabriano	
29	2025	Tokyo; Metropolitan; Gymnasium	(Ukraine) Derugina School	(Individual Neutral Athletes) AIN2	(United States) Burlo/Pacific Club	
30	2026	Tokyo; Metropolitan; Gymnasium	(Russia) Sky Grace	(United States) Burlo/Pacific Club	(Ukraine) Derugina School	

=== Individual all-around medalists ===
==== Senior ====
Ed.	Year	Gold	Silver	Bronze	Ref.
1	1994				
2	1995	(Bulgaria) Maria Petrova	(Ukraine) Ekaterina Serebrianskaya	(Ukraine) Elena Vitrichenko	
3	1996	(Ukraine) Ekaterina Serebrianskaya	(Belarus) Larisa Lukyanenko	(Bulgaria) Stella Salapatiyska (Ukraine) Elena Vitrichenko	
4	1997	(Russia) Natalia Lipkovskaya	(Ukraine) Ekaterina Serebrianskaya	(Ukraine) Elena Vitrichenko	
5	1998	(Russia) Alina Kabaeva	(Russia) Assel Mustafina	(Belarus) Evgenia Pavlina	
6	1999	(Russia) Alina Kabaeva	(Russia) Yulia Barsukova	(Belarus) Yulia Raskina	
7	2000	(Russia) Yulia Barsukova	(Belarus) Yulia Raskina (Russia) Irina Tchachina	None awarded	
8	2001	(Russia) Alina Kabaeva	(Russia) Irina Tchachina	(Ukraine) Tamara Yerofeeeva	
9	2002	(Russia) Alina Kabaeva	(Russia) Irina Tchachina	(Ukraine) Tamara Yerofeeeva	
10	2003	(Russia) Irina Tchachina	(Russia) Alina Kabaeva	(Ukraine) Anna Bessonova	
11	2004	(Russia) Alina Kabaeva	(Russia) Irina Tchachina	(Ukraine) Anna Bessonova	
12	2005	(Russia) Olga Kapranova	(Russia) Vera Sessina	(Ukraine) Anna Bessonova	
13	2006	(Russia) Vera Sessina	(Russia) Alina Kabaeva	(Belarus) Inna Zhukova	
14	2007	(Russia) Olga Kapranova	(Russia) Vera Sessina	(Ukraine) Anna Bessonova	
15	2008	(Russia) Evgenia Kanaeva	(Ukraine) Anna Bessonova	(Ukraine) Natalia Godunko	
16	2010	(Russia) Evgenia Kanaeva	(Russia) Daria Kondakova	(Belarus) Melitina Staniouta	
17	2011	(Russia) Evgenia Kanaeva	(Russia) Daria Kondakova	(Ukraine) Alina Maksymenko	
18	2012	(Russia) Daria Dmitrieva	(Ukraine) Anna Rizatdinova	(Belarus) Melitina Staniouta	
19	2013	(Russia) Yana Kudryavtseva	(Belarus) Melitina Staniouta	(Russia) Margarita Mamun	
20	2014	(Russia) Margarita Mamun	(Russia) Yana Kudryavtseva	(Belarus) Melitina Staniouta	
21	2015	(Russia) Margarita Mamun	(Ukraine) Anna Rizatdinova	(Russia) Alexandra Soldatova	
22	2016	(Russia) Margarita Mamun	(Ukraine) Anna Rizatdinova	(Russia) Alexandra Soldatova	
23	2017	(Russia) Dina Averina	(Russia) Yulia Bravikova	(Belarus) Katsiaryna Halkina	
24	2018	(Russia) Dina Averina	(Russia) Arina Averina	(Israel) Linoy Ashram	
25	2019	(Russia) Dina Averina	(Russia) Arina Averina	(Ukraine) Vlada Nikolchenko	
26	2022	(Italy) Sofia Raffaeli	(Ukraine) Viktoriia Onopriienko	(Italy) Milena Baldassarri	
27	2023	(Germany) Darja Varfolomeev	(Ukraine) Viktoriia Onopriienko	(Italy) Sofia Raffaeli	
28	2024	(Italy) Sofia Raffaeli	(Individual Neutral Athletes) Alina Harnasko	(Ukraine) Taisiia Onofriichuk	
29	2025	(Ukraine) Taisiia Onofriichuk	(United States) Rin Keys	(Romania) Amalia Lică	
30	2026	(Russia) Sofiia Ilteriakova	(Russia) Mariia Borisova	(United States) Megan Chu	

==== Junior ====
Ed.	Year	Gold	Silver	Bronze	Ref.
1	1994				
2	1995	(Russia) Anna Chichova	(Bulgaria) Teodora Alexandrova	(Belarus) Valeria Vatkina	
3	1996	(Russia) Alina Kabaeva	(North Korea) Yun Myongran	(Ukraine) Tamara Erofeeva	
4	1997	(Russia) Alina Kabaeva	(Ukraine) Anna Bessonova	(Belarus) Elona Ossiadovskaya	
5	1998	(Russia) Zarina Gizikova	(Belarus) Elona Ossiadovskaya	(Ukraine) Anna Bessonova	
6	1999	(Russia) Zarina Gizikova	(Ukraine) Olena Dzyubchuk	(Belarus) Alyona Gnezditskaya	
7	2000	(Russia) Olessia Manouilova (Russia) Dinara Gimatova	None awarded	(Belarus) Alyona Gnezditskaya	
8	2001	(Russia) Olga Peskicheva	(Belarus) Valeria Kurilskaya	(Ukraine) Anna Feteyeva	
9	2002	(Russia) Olga Peskicheva	(Belarus) Valeria Kurilskaya	(Czech Republic) Dominika Červenková	
10	2003	(Russia) Evgenia Kanaeva	(Belarus) Ekaterina Bezverkhaya	(Ukraine) Galina Shyrkina	
11	2004	(Russia) Evgenia Kanaeva	(Belarus) Maria Yushkevich	(Kazakhstan) Mizana Ismailova	
12	2005	(Russia) Evgenia Kanaeva	(Belarus) Maria Yushkevich	(Ukraine) Maryna Boyko	
13	2006	(Belarus) Anastasia Ivankova	(Ukraine) Daria Kushnerova	(Russia) Ekaterina Donich	
14	2007	(Russia) Alexandra Ermakova	(Ukraine) Daria Kushnerova	(Japan) Kana Yokoyama	
15	2008	(Russia) Daria Dmitrieva	(Belarus) Melitina Staniouta	(Azerbaijan) Samira Mustafaeva	
16	2010	(Russia) Daria Svatkovskaya	(Belarus) Arina Charopa	(Ukraine) Viktoriia Shynkarenko	
17	2011	(Russia) Alexandra Soldatova	(Japan) Kaho Minagawa	(Belarus) Elena Bolotina	
18	2012	(Belarus) Katsiaryna Halkina	(Russia) Yulia Bravikova	(Ukraine) Anastasia Mulmina	
19	2013	(Russia) Yulia Bravikova	(Belarus) Hanna Bazhko	(Ukraine) Eleonora Romanova	
20	2014	(Russia) Veronika Poliakova	(Belarus) Mariya Trubach	(Azerbaijan) Zhala Piriyeva	
21	2015	(Russia) Alina Ermolova	(Uzbekistan) Sabina Tashkenbaeva	(Azerbaijan) Zhala Piriyeva	
22	2016	(Russia) Maria Sergeeva	(Belarus) Alina Harnasko	(Israel) Karin Kantorovich	
23	2017	(Russia) Anastasia Sergeeva	(Belarus) Anastasiia Salos	(Uzbekistan) Takhmina Ikromova	
24	2018	(Russia) Anastasia Sergeeva	(Japan) Aino Yamada	(Belarus) Yana Striga	
25	2019	(Italy) Sofia Raffaeli	(Ukraine) Nikol Krasiuk	(Russia) Sofia Agafonova	
26	2022	(Ukraine) Taisiia Onofriichuk	(United States) Rin Alessia Keys	(Italy) Lorjen D'Ambrogio	
27	2023	(Germany) Lada Pusch	(Ukraine) Taisiia Onofriichuk	(United States) Rin Keys	
28	2024	(Ukraine) Taisiia Redka	(United States) Natalie de la Rosa	(Individual Neutral Athletes) Nicole Liauta	
29	2025	(Individual Neutral Athletes) Kseniia Savinova	(Kyrgyzstan) Asel Arapova	(Italy) Ginevra Bindi	
30	2026	(Russia) Iana Zaikina	(United States) Anna Filipp	(Israel) Mariia Miachina	
