= Hanna Rizatdinova =

Ukrainian rhythmic gymnast (born 1993)

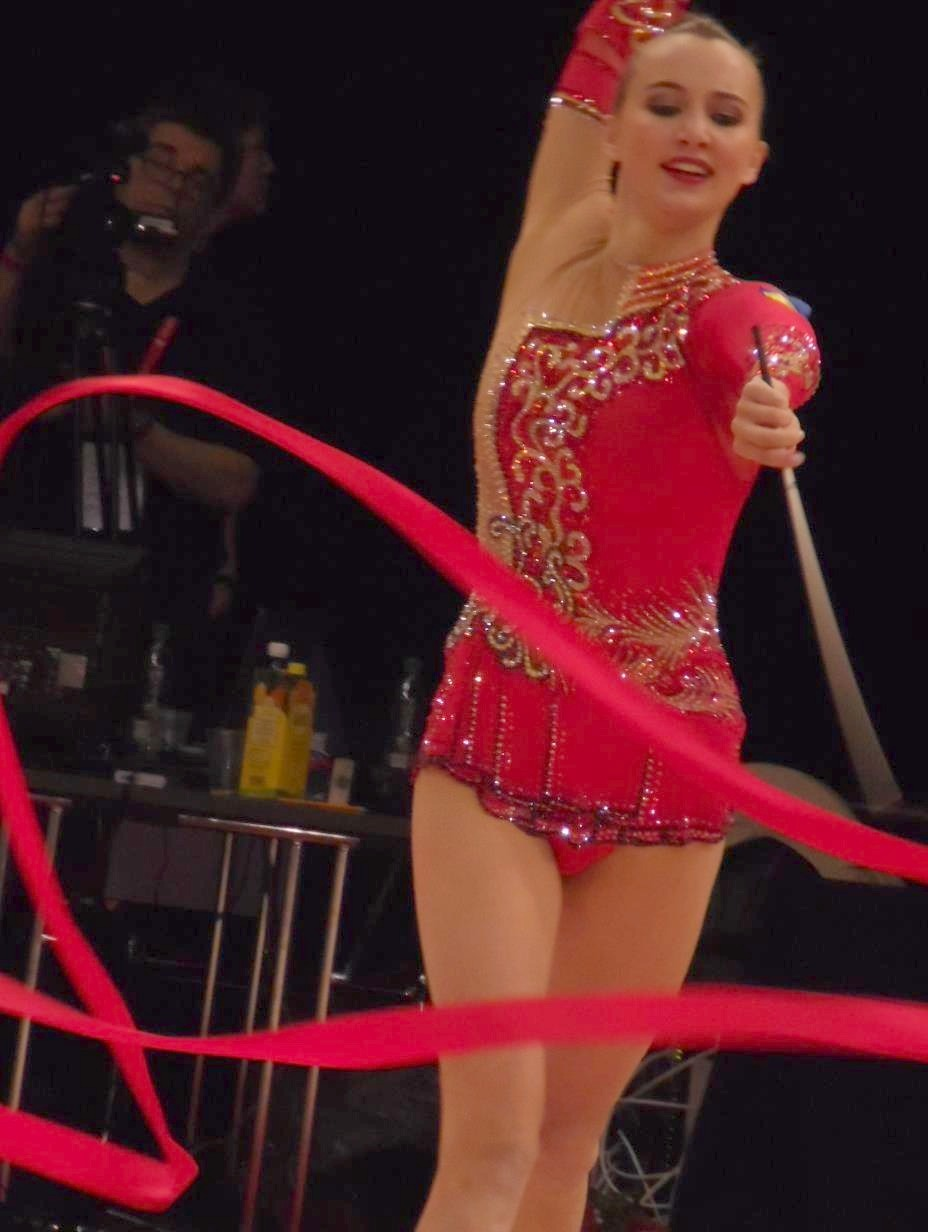
- Rizatdinova at the 2013 Miss Valentine

Personal information
- Full name: Hanna Serhiivna Rizatdinova
- Alternative names: Ganna, Anna
- Born: 16 July 1993 (age 33) Simferopol, Autonomous Republic of Crimea, Ukraine
- Height: 173 cm (5 ft 8 in)

Gymnastics career
- Discipline: Rhythmic gymnastics
- Country represented: Ukraine
- Club: Deriugina school
- Head coach: Albina Deriugina
- Assistant coaches: Irina Deriugina and Iryna Blokhina
- Choreographer: Iryna Blokhina
- Retired: 2017
- World ranking: 4 (2016 season); 8 (2015 season); 4 (2014 season); 2 (2013 season); 6 (2012 season); 21 (2011 season)
Medal record
International gymnastics competitions
Event	1st	2nd	3rd
Olympic Games	0	0	1
World Championships	1	2	9
European Games	0	2	0
European Championships	0	3	4
World Games	1	2	0
Summer Universiade	1	3	4
Gymnasiade	1	3	0
Total	4	15	18
Rhythmic Gymnastics
Representing Ukraine
Olympic Games
Bronze medal – third place	2016 Rio de Janeiro	All-around
World Championships
Gold medal – first place	2013 Kyiv	Hoop
Silver medal – second place	2013 Kyiv	All-around
Silver medal – second place	2013 Kyiv	Ribbon
Bronze medal – third place	2011 Montpellier	Team
Bronze medal – third place	2014 Izmir	All-around
Bronze medal – third place	2014 Izmir	Clubs
Bronze medal – third place	2014 Izmir	Ribbon
Bronze medal – third place	2014 Izmir	Team
Bronze medal – third place	2015 Stuttgart	Hoop
Bronze medal – third place	2015 Stuttgart	Ribbon
Bronze medal – third place	2015 Stuttgart	Clubs
Bronze medal – third place	2015 Stuttgart	Team
European Games
Silver medal – second place	2015 Baku	Ball
Silver medal – second place	2015 Baku	Clubs
European Championships
Silver medal – second place	2013 Vienna	Team
Silver medal – second place	2013 Vienna	Ribbon
Silver medal – second place	2015 Minsk	Clubs
Bronze medal – third place	2011 Minsk	Team
Bronze medal – third place	2014 Baku	All-around
Bronze medal – third place	2015 Minsk	Team
Bronze medal – third place	2016 Holon	All-around
Junior European Championships
Bronze medal – third place	2008 Turin	Team
World Games
Gold medal – first place	2013 Cali	Hoop
Silver medal – second place	2013 Cali	Ball
Silver medal – second place	2013 Cali	Clubs
Summer Universiade
Gold medal – first place	2015 Gwangju	Clubs
Silver medal – second place	2013 Kazan	Clubs
Silver medal – second place	2015 Gwangju	All-around
Silver medal – second place	2015 Gwangju	Ball
Bronze medal – third place	2013 Kazan	All-around
Bronze medal – third place	2013 Kazan	Hoop
Bronze medal – third place	2013 Kazan	Ball
Bronze medal – third place	2015 Gwangju	Ribbon
Gymnasiade
Gold medal – first place	2009 Doha	Hoop
Silver medal – second place	2009 Doha	Team
Silver medal – second place	2009 Doha	Rope
Silver medal – second place	2009 Doha	All-around
Event	1st	2nd	3rd
Grand Prix	5	6	4
World Cup Series	17	25	28
Total	22	31	32
- Awards: Longines Prize for Elegance (2013)

Hanna Serhiivna Rizatdinova (Note: Alternatively spelled as Ganna Rizatdinova or Anna Rizatdinova.) (Ukrainian: Ганна Сергіївна Різатдінова; born 16 July 1993) is a Ukrainian individual rhythmic gymnast. In the all-around event, she is the 2016 Olympic bronze medalist, a two-time World all-around medalist (silver in 2013, bronze in 2014), and a two-time (2014, 2016) European all-around bronze medalist. She is also the 2013 World hoop champion.

== Career ==
Rizatdinova started to train gymnastics in Simferopol and was coached by her mother Oksana Rizatdinova. She won the silver all-around medal at the 2008 Kyiv Junior World Cup behind Russian gymnast Daria Dmitrieva. She was part of the Ukraine team that won bronze at the 2008 European Junior Championships in Turin.

As a senior, Rizatdinova won bronze with Team Ukraine at the 2011 World Championships and 2011 European Championships.

Rizatdinova had a successful World Cup series at the 2012 Deriugina Cup in Kyiv. She won the bronze in the all-around and in the hoop final, and silver for the ball and clubs final. She then competed at the 2012 European Championships and finished 8th in the all-around.

Rizatdinova represented Ukraine in the individual all-around event at the 2012 Summer Olympics, where she placed 10th in the finals.

=== 2013 ===
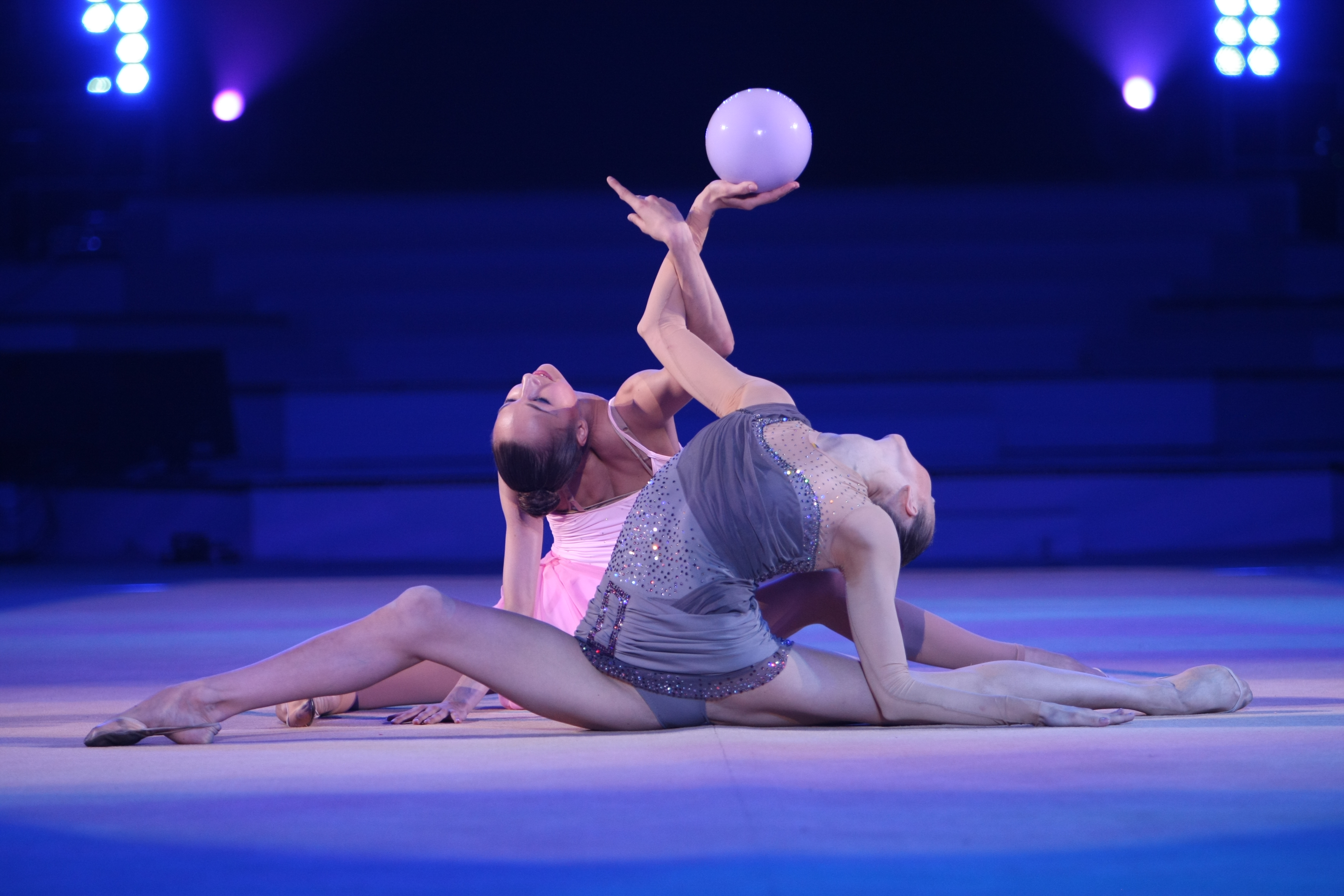
Rizatdinova and Viktoria Mazur at the 2011 LG Whisen All-star Gala

Rizatdinova returned to competition in the 2013 Season under the new Code of Points system. She won the 2013 LA Lights and won the gold in all-around at the first World Cup series held in Tartu, Estonia. At the second World Cup in Lisbon, Portugal, Rizatdinova won the bronze medal in All-around behind Russians Margarita Mamun and Alexandra Merkulova. She won another pair of silver medal in clubs, a ball final and a bronze medal in the hoop final. Rizatdinova competed at the 2013 Pesaro World Cup where she won a bronze medal in ribbon and clubs. She finished 5th in all-around at the 2013 Sofia World Cup, she shared the bronze medal in clubs with Son Yeon-Jae and won silver in clubs and ribbon (tied with Margarita Mamun). Hanna won her second World Cup All-around gold in 2013 Corbeil-Essonnes beating gymnasts Melitina Staniouta of Belarus and Margarita Mamun of Russia. She won gold in clubs, silver in hoop and ribbon, bronze in ball final. Rizatdinova then competed at the 2013 European Championships in Vienna, Austria and (together with her teammates Alina Maksymenko and Viktoria Mazur) won the Team silver medal. She won silver in the ribbon final. At the 2013 Summer Universiade in Kazan, she won the bronze medal in all-around. In the event finals, she shared the silver medal with teammate Alina Maksymenko and won bronze in ball and clubs (also tied with Alina Maksymenko). Rizatdinova together with Maksymenko and Mazur appeared in an editorial on the 2013 August edition of Ukraine Vogue. Rizatdinova competed at the 2013 World Games in Cali where she won gold in hoop and silver medals in ball, clubs. She then competed at the 2013 World Championships in Kyiv, Ukraine where she qualified to 4 event finals. She won gold in hoop beating newly turned Russian senior Yana Kudryavtseva and her teammate Margarita Mamun, it was Ukraine's first gold medal since Anna Bessonova became the World Champion in 2007, Rizatdinova also won silver in ribbon, placed 6th in ball and 4th in clubs final. Rizatdinova won the All-around silver at the 2013 World Championships with an overall score of 73.041 ahead of Belarusian Melitina Staniouta. She was awarded the Longines Prize for Elegance in rhythmic gymnastics event. On October 25–27, Rizatdinova competed at the World Club Championship, the 2013 Aeon Cup in Tokyo, Japan representing team Deriugina school (together with teammates Viktoria Mazur and junior Eleonora Romanova) won the team silver. She finished 4th in the All-around finals behind Melitina Staniouta of Belarus.

=== 2014 ===
In 2014 Season, Rizatdinova began competing at the 2014 LA Lights and won the all-around silver medal behind Melitina Staniouta. She finished 5th in all-around at the 2014 Thiais Grand Prix, won silver in ball, bronze in clubs, hoop and gold in ribbon (tied with Melitina Staniouta of Belarus). Rizatdinova won the All-around silver medal behind Russian debutante Aleksandra Soldatova at the 2014 Debrecen World Cup after missing a ball routine element and dropping the apparatus. Qualifying to all 4 event finals, she won the gold medal in ball, silver in clubs, placed 4th in ribbon and 6th in hoop. She finished 5th in All-around at the 2014 Stuttgart World Cup, qualifying to 4 event finals: she won bronze in ball (tied with Mamun), placed 4th in hoop, 7th in clubs and 8th in ribbon. Rizatdinova's next event was at the 2014 Pesaro World Cup where she won the all-bronze behind Kudryavtseva and Mamun, in the event finals: she won bronze in hoop and ribbon. On 9–11 May Rizatdinova won the all-around bronze at the 2014 Corbeil-Essonnes World Cup, she qualified to 4 event finals and won gold in hoop, ball and bronze in ribbon. On 10–15 June Rizatdinova competed at the 2014 European Championships and won the all-around bronze medal. On 22–28 September Rizatdinova (along with teammates Viktoria Mazur and Eleonora Romanova) represented Ukraine at the 2014 World Championships where they took the Team bronze with a total of 135.515 points. She qualified to all event finals and won 2 bronze medals (clubs, ribbon) and placed 4th (in hoop, clubs). In the All-around, Rizatdinova won the all-around bronze medal with a total of 72.449 points putting her ahead of Korean Son Yeon-Jae. On 17–19 October Rizatdinova traveled in Tokyo for the 2014 Aeon Cup, representing the Deriugina school club team (together with teammates Eleonora Romanova and junior Mariia Mulyk), and won the team bronze. She finished 4th in the All-around finals behind Melitina Staniouta of Belarus.

=== 2015 ===
In 2015 Season, Rizatdinova's first competition was at the 2015 L.A. Lights where she won the all-around gold ahead of Belarusians Melitina Staniouta and Katsiaryna Halkina. She then swept the gold medals at the 2015 Valentine Cup in the all-around and all event finals. On 13–15 March Rizatdinova then took the silver medal at the Trophy de Barcelona in the all-around. On 21–22 March Rizatdinova won the all-around gold at the 2015 Thiais Grand Prix, in event finals, she took gold in hoop, ribbon, clubs (tied with Marina Durunda) and silver in ball. On 10–12 April Rizatdinova placed 4th in all-around at the 2015 Pesaro World Cup, she qualified to 4 event finals taking silver in ribbon, bronze in clubs and finishing 4th in hoop, ball. Rizatdinova with teammates (Viktoria Mazur, Eleonora Romanova) competed at the 2015 European Championships where Team Ukraine won bronze, Rizatdinova qualified to all 4 event finals: silver in clubs, 5th in hoop, 4th in ball, and 7th in ribbon. Rizatdinova competed at the 2015 Holon Grand Prix finishing 4th in all-around behind Russian Aleksandra Soldatova. She qualified to all apparatus finals: winning gold in ribbon, silver in clubs, placed 4th in hoop, and 7th in ball. On 15–21 June Rizatdinova competed at the inaugural 2015 European Games where she finished 4th in the all-around behind Belarusian Melitina Staniouta, she qualified to all 4 apparatus finals: taking silver medals (in ball, clubs), she finished 6th in hoop and 5th in ribbon. Her next competition was at the 2015 Summer Universiade in Gwangju, Korea were Rizatdinova won the all-around silver medal behind Korean Son Yeon-Jae. She qualified to all event apparatus winning gold in clubs, silver in ball, bronze in ribbon and 4th in hoop. In August, Rizatdinova competed at the 2015 Budapest World Cup finishing 5th in all-around behind Aleksandra Soldatova, Rizatdinova qualified to 4 apparatus finals finishing 4th in hoop, ball, a silver in clubs and in her last event, she won gold in ribbon ahead of Russian Margarita Mamun. In her next competition at the 2015 Sofia World Cup, Rizatdinova won the all-around bronze medal ahead of Melitina Staniouta. She qualified to all apparatus finals taking bronze in hoop, ball, clubs and ribbon. On 9–13 September Rizatdinova (together with teammates Viktoria Mazur, and Eleonora Romanova) competed at the 2015 World Championships in Stuttgart, with Team Ukraine winning the bronze medal. Rizatdinova also qualified to all apparatus finals taking bronze medals in hoop, clubs, ribbon and finished 4th in ball. In the all-around finals; Rizatdinova dropped her clubs out of the carpet in her last throw ending her hopes for a medal finish, she eventually finished 5th behind Georgia's Salome Pazhava. On 2–4 October Rizatdinova together with teammates Viktoria Mazur and junior Olena Diachenko represented Team Deriugins School at the 2015 Aeon Cup in Tokyo Japan, Rizatdinova won silver in the individual all-around finals with a total of 73.616 and with team Ukraine taking silver in the overall standings.

=== 2016 ===
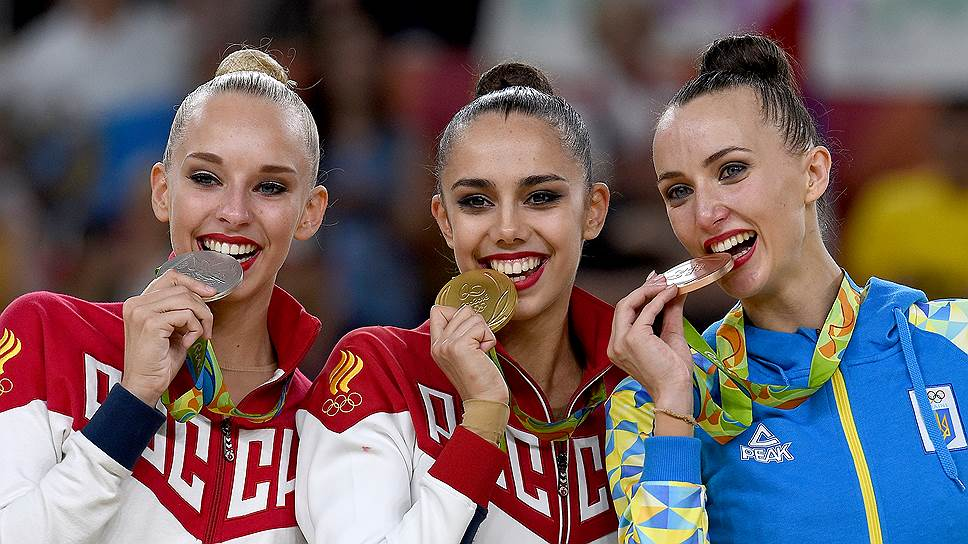
Rizatdinova (right) on the Olympic podium with her bronze medal

In 2016, Rizatdinova started her season with an all-around gold medal win at the 2016 L.A. Lights. In February, Rizatdinova followed it with another gold medal win in all-around at the 2016 Valentine Cup in Tartu, Estonia. On 26–28 February Rizatdinova competed at the 2016 Espoo World Cup and took bronze in the all-around; in apparatus finals, she won gold in ribbon, hoop, silver in clubs and bronze in ball. On 17–20 March Rizatdinova then competed at the 2016 Lisboa World Cup where she won the all-around silver with a total of 73.700 points. In apparatus finals, she won gold in clubs, ribbon, silver in hoop, 9th in ball due to the ball going outside the lines, picking up a new ball, and not completing a mastery. At the 30th Thiais Grand Prix event in Paris, Rizatdinova finished 4th in the all-around behind Melitina Staniouta, she qualified 3 apparatus finals taking silver in clubs, bronze in ribbon and placed 6th in ball. On 1–3 April Rizatdinova competed at the 2016 Pesaro World Cup where she won the all-around bronze with a total of 74.550 points. In event finals: she won gold in ball, ribbon, silver in hoop and 9th after a drop in her mastery and in her dance steps in clubs. On 6–8 May Rizatdinova won the all-around gold at the Corbeil-Essonnes International Tournament with a total of 74.165 points; she also won gold in all 4 apparatus finals. Rizatdinova then won silver in the all-around at the 2016 Sofia World Cup, and in the apparatus finals she won gold in hoop, silver in ball, clubs and 4th in ribbon. On 3–5 June Rizatdinova then won silver in the all-around at the 2016 Guadalajara World Cup with a new PB score of 75.150 points, she won silver in ball, bronze in hoop, clubs and placed 5th in ribbon. On 17–19 June Rizatdinova competed at the 2016 European Championships where she won the All-around bronze medal scoring a total of 75.299 points behind Margarita Mamun. On 1–3 July Rizatdinova competed at the 2016 Berlin World Cup where she finished 5th in the all-around after dropping her ball in a risk element; a roll out of carpet and mistakes in her clubs routine, she qualified to 3 apparatus taking gold in clubs, hoop(tied with Melitina Staniouta) and silver in ribbon. Rizatdinova competed at the 2016 Rio Olympics, on 20 August at the rhythmic gymnastics individual all-around final, she won the bronze medal with a total of 73.583, edging out Korean Son Yeon-Jae. On 9–11 September Rizatdinova together with teammates Viktoria Mazur and junior Olena Diachenko represented team Deriugina school at the annual 2016 Aeon Cup in Tokyo, where they won the team bronze and with Rizatdinova finishing 2nd in the all-around.

=== 2017 ===
In 2017, the post-Olympic season with a new code of points, Rizatdinova was scheduled to compete at the Kyiv Grand Prix. However, she withdrew from the competition after her hoop routine. Later that year, she was invited as an honorary guest to the 2017 World Championships in Pesaro, Italy, and it was discovered that she was 7 months pregnant. A couple of weeks later, she confirmed her pregnancy via Instagram.

== Early and personal life ==
Rizatdinova was born in Simferopol, Crimea. Since 2011, Rizatdinova lives in Kyiv. Her mother heads a Simferopol rhythmic gymnastics school. Both her parents grew up in Russia before they moved to Crimea. Her father is of Kazan Tatar descent.

During late 2013 and early 2014 Euromaidan-protest in Kyiv, Rizatdinova and her teammates changed training halls several times "because the coaches did not know where it would be safer" and their main training centre October Palace became occupied by protesters. Rizatdinova admitted that during Euromaidan, "we were very terrified".

Roughly three months after the March 2014 annexation of Crimea by Russia (Note: Crimea is currently under dispute by Russia and Ukraine.) , on 24 June 2014, Rizatdinova stated that she was "outraged" and found the annexation to be "unpleasant and terrifying", because she did not believe that Crimea was part of Russia. She also vowed never to compete for Russia.

Rizatdinova is the ex-wife of Oleksandr Onyshchenko. In 2017, their son Roman was born.

== Routine music information ==
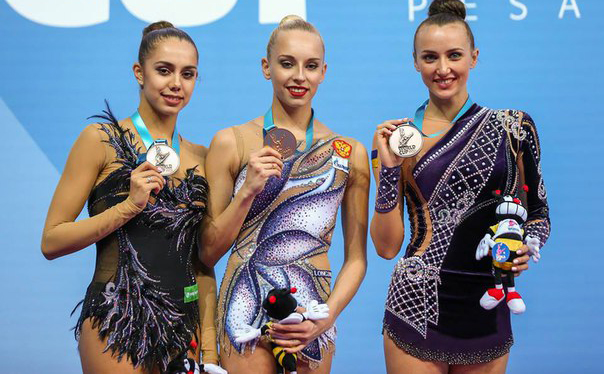
Rizatdinova at the 2016 Pesaro World Cup podium.

Year	Apparatus	Music title
2016	Hoop	España Caní, España Caní by Manhattan Pops Orchestra, Trio Norté
2016	Ball	I Put a Spell on You music from Fifty Shades of Grey by Annie Lennox
2016	Clubs	They Don't Care About Us by Olodum, Michael Jackson, David Garrett
2016	Ribbon	Tomorrow Never Comes, Time To Go Crazy by Rishi & Harshil
2015	Hoop	Rhapsody In Blue by George Gershwin
2015	Ball	Canção Do Mar (Chill Guitar Mix), Canção Do Mar by Blue System, Dulce Pontes
2015	Clubs	Found (Grand Version) by Kerry Muzzey
2015	Ribbon	Carmen Suite by Rodion Shchedrin
2014	Hoop	Caruso by Luciano Pavarotti
2014	Ball	Weather Storm by Craig Armstrong
2014	Clubs	The Wheat by Hans Zimmer
2014	Ribbon	Carmen's Entrance and Habanera by Rodion Shchedrin
2013	Hoop	Moonlight Sonata by Dave Moore, Dick Heckstall-Smith
2013	Ball (second)	Billie Jean by Michael Jackson, AyseDeniz
2013	Ball (first)	"Basic Instinct Main Theme", "An Unending Story" by Jerry Goldsmith
2013	Clubs	Létoile by Parov Stelar and Max The Sax
2013	Ribbon	Besame Mucho (remix) by Sean Finn and Picco ft. Carolina Lopez
2012	Hoop	The Fast And The Furious: Tokyo Drift by Brian Tyler
2012	Ball	The Promise by Secret Garden
2012	Clubs	Black Gold by Armand Amar
2012	Ribbon (second)	Smooth Criminal by 2 Cellos (Sulic & Hauser)
2011	Hoop	The Fast And The Furious: Tokyo Drift by Brian Tyler
2011	Clubs	"I am not ready to die" music from The Island OST by Steve Jablonsky
2011	Ball	The Promise by Secret Garden
2011	Ribbon	Emigrant by Tanghetto
2010	Hoop	The Fast And The Furious: Tokyo Drift by Brian Tyler
2010	Rope	Plaza of Execution / Leave No Witnesses / The Ride / The Fencing Lesson music from The Mask of Zorro by James Horner
2010	Ball	Introduction: Moderato Assai - Allegro Ma Non Troppo music from Swan Lake by Tchaikovsky
2010	Ribbon	Hopak (Ukrainian Folk)

== Detailed Olympic results ==
Year	Competition Description	Location	Music	Apparatus	Score-Final	Score-Qualifying
2016	Olympics	Rio de Janeiro		All-around	73.583	73.932
2016	Olympics	Rio de Janeiro	Tomorrow Never Comes, Time To Go Crazy by Rishi & Harshil	Ribbon	18.483	18.500
2016	Olympics	Rio de Janeiro	They Don't Care About Us by Olodum, Michael Jackson, David Garrett	Clubs	18.450	18.466
2016	Olympics	Rio de Janeiro	I Put a Spell on You music from Fifty Shades of Grey by Annie Lennox	Ball	18.450	18.566
2016	Olympics	Rio de Janeiro	España Caní, España Caní by Manhattan Pops Orchestra, Trio Norté	Hoop	18.200	18.400

Year	Competition Description	Location	Music	Apparatus	Score-Final	Score-Qualifying
2012	Olympics	London		All-around	107.400	108.850
2012	Olympics	London	Smooth Criminal by 2 Cellos (Sulic & Hauser)	Ribbon	26.500	26.950
2012	Olympics	London	The Promise by Secret Garden	Ball	27.050	26.800
2012	Olympics	London	The Fast And The Furious: Tokyo Drift by Brian Tyler	Hoop	26.750	27.350
2012	Olympics	London	Black Gold by Armand Amar	Clubs	27.100	27.750
