= Alina Maksymenko =

Ukrainian rhythmic gymnast (born 1991)

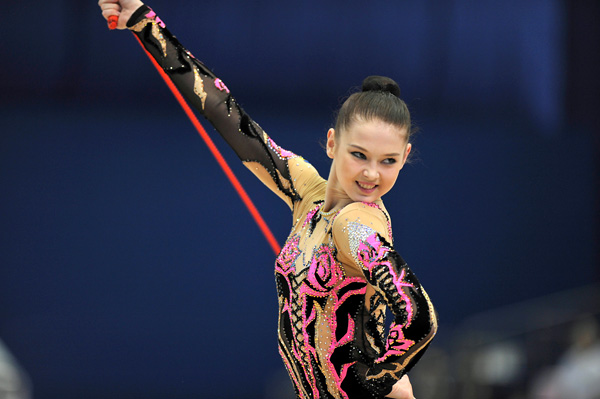
- Maksymenko performs with rope at 2009 World Championships at Mie, Japan

Personal information
- Full name: Alina Oleksandrivna Maksymenko
- Born: 10 July 1991 (age 35) Zaporizhzhia, Ukrainian SSR, Soviet Union
- Height: 174 cm (5 ft 9 in)

Gymnastics career
- Discipline: Rhythmic gymnastics
- Country represented: Ukraine
- Club: Deriugins School
- Head coach: Albina Deriugina
- Assistant coach: Irina Deriugina
- Choreographer: Irina Grischenko
- Retired: 2013
- World ranking: 9 (2013 Season); 16 (2012 Season); 14 (2011 Season)
Medal record
Rhythmic Gymnastics
Representing Ukraine
World Championships
Bronze medal – third place	2011 Montpellier	Team
Bronze medal – third place	2013 Kyiv	Clubs
European Championships
Silver medal – second place	2013 Vienna	Team
Bronze medal – third place	2009 Baku	Team
Bronze medal – third place	2011 Minsk	Team
Bronze medal – third place	2011 Minsk	Clubs
World Cup Final
Bronze medal – third place	2008 Benidorm	3 hoops/ 4 clubs
Bronze medal – third place	2008 Benidorm	5 ropes
World Games
Bronze medal – third place	2013 Cali	Ball
Bronze medal – third place	2013 Cali	Clubs
Summer Universiade
Silver medal – second place	2011 Shenzhen	Hoop
Silver medal – second place	2013 Kazan	Clubs
Bronze medal – third place	2011 Shenzhen	Clubs
Bronze medal – third place	2013 Kazan	Hoop

Alina Oleksandrivna Maksymenko (Ukrainian: Аліна Олександрівна Максименко, born 10 July 1991) is a retired individual rhythmic gymnast.

== Career ==
=== Junior ===
She competed at the 2006 Deriugina cup and won a silver medal in the all-around behind Daria Kushnerova.

=== Senior ===
In 2007, she made a debut at the World Championships in Patras, Greece, where she was a part of the Ukrainian senior group (Olena Dmytrash, Polina Kondaurova, Viera Perederiy, Oksana Petulko, Vita Zubchenko) that finished 8th in Group All-around.

In 2008, Maksymenko participated as a member of the Ukrainian Group at the 2008 Summer Olympics in Beijing, China. They finished eighth in the group all-around finals.

At the 2009 World Championships in Ise, Mie, Japan, Maksymenko began competing as an individual gymnast and placed 16th in the all-around final. She competed at the 2009 World Games in Kaohsiung, Taiwan and placed 5th in Hoop, 6th in Ribbon, 7th in Rope, and 8th in Ball. At the 2010 World Championships in Moscow, Russia, she placed 5th in the all-around final. She was also one of the only two gymnasts to qualify for all of the event finals (the other being Aliya Garayeva). She was 4th in Rope final, 5th in Hoop, 6th in Ball, and 8th in Ribbon.

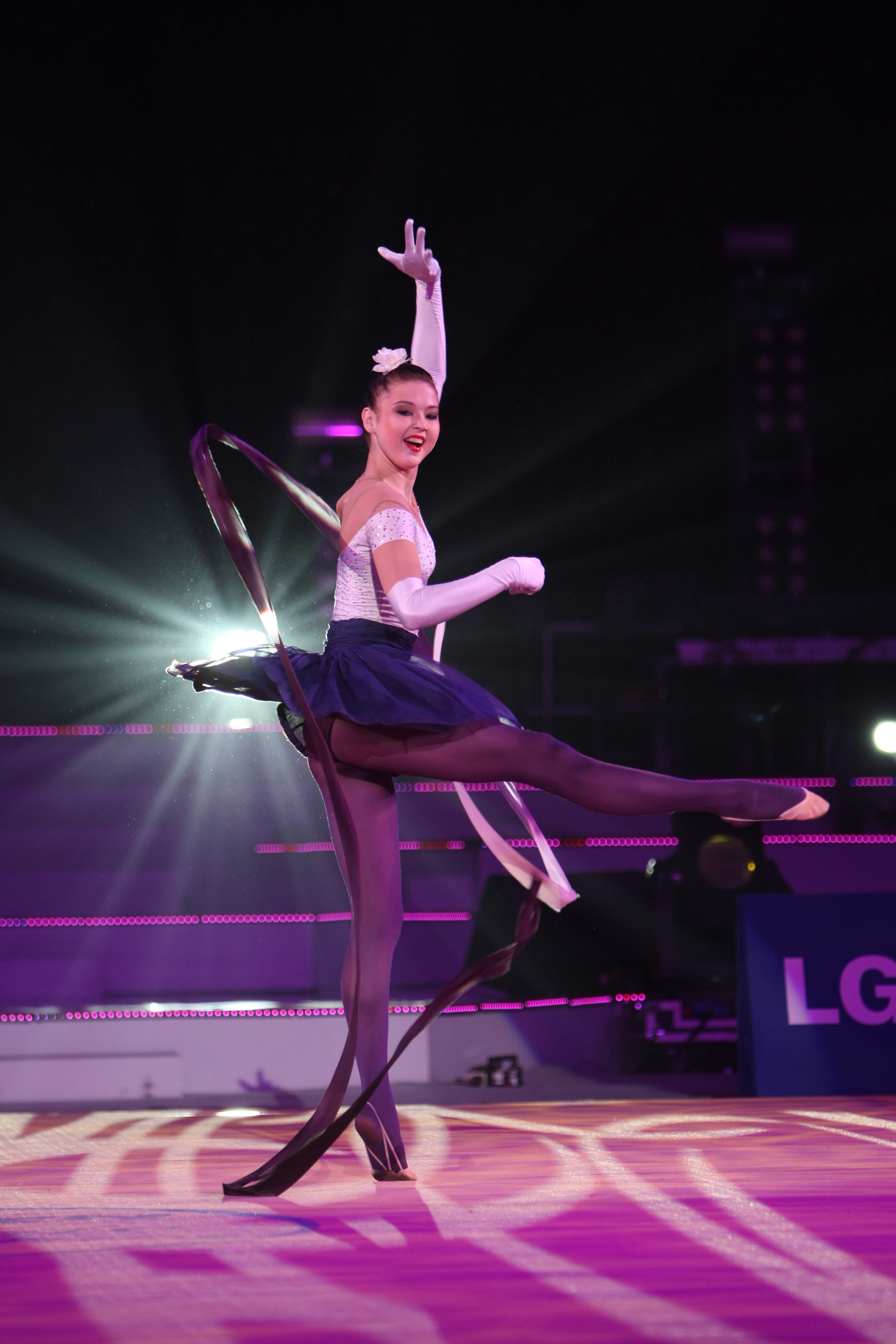
Maksymenko at the 2011 LG WHISEN Rhythmic All Stars Gala

Maksymenko won three gold and one silver medal at the Deriugina World Cup 2011. At the 2011 Universiade held in Shenzhen, she won the silver medal in the hoop final (28.100) and the bronze medal in the clubs final. Maksymenko also helped Ukraine win the team bronze medal at the 2011 World Championships in Montpellier, France. She placed 5th in the all-around final and qualified for the London 2012 Olympics.

She started her 2012 season competing at the LA Lights in Los Angeles, but struggled with her new routines and finished behind fellow Ukrainian Ganna Rizatdinova in all-around. She then competed at the 2012 Deriugina Cup and took silver in all-around behind Russian gymnast Daria Dmitrieva. Maksymenko competed in the individual all-around event at the 2012 Summer Olympics in London where her fashion style caught attention. She qualified for the finals and finished 6th overall.

At the 2013 LA Lights, she won the silver medal in the all-around behind teammate Ganna Rizatdinova. She then competed at the 2013 Holon Grand Prix, where she finished 12th in all-around and won gold in clubs final. She finished 5th in all-around in her first World Cup competition of the season in Lisbon, Portugal. At the 2013 Irina Deleanu Cup, she won the silver in all-around and bronze in clubs. She won another bronze medal in the hoop final at the Pesaro World Cup. She withdrew from the Sofia World Cup due to an aggravated injury. Maksymenko then competed at the 2013 European Championships in Vienna, Austria, and together with her teammates Ganna Rizatdinova and Viktoria Mazur won the Team silver medal. Maksymenko competed at the International Trophy "Ciutat de Barcelona", where she won silver in the all-around behind Russian gymnast Alexandra Merkulova. At the 2013 Summer Universiade in Kazan, she finished 4th in all-around behind teammate Ganna Rizatdinova. She won silver in the hoop (tied with teammate Rizatdinova) and bronze in the clubs (also tied with Rizatdinova). Maksymenko, together with Rizatdinova and Mazur, appeared in an editorial in the August 2013 edition of Ukraine Vogue. Maksymenko competed at the 2013 World Games in Cali, where she won bronze medals in ball and clubs. Maksymenko won a bronze in Clubs at the 2013 World Championships in Kyiv, Ukraine. Maksymenko finished 7th in the All-around at the 2013 World Championships. Maksymenko completed her career at the end of the 2013 season and accepted the invitation of her coaches in the Deriugins School to work as a coach.

== Personal life ==
Maksymenko can speak Ukrainian, English, and Russian. Since 2023, she has been working at iSTAR Academy in West Sussex, Great Britain. She is currently a coach of senior national group that competed at 2024 European Championships.

== Routine Music Information ==
Year	Apparatus	Music title
2013	Hoop	"Taken 2 (Main Theme)", "Murad Arrives", "In The Van", "Love The Way You Lie" by Nathaniel Mechaly, Eminem, Rihanna
2013	Ball	"Gratta Keka" by Appart
2013	Clubs	"Fever" by A Fine Frenzy
2013	Ribbon	"Taiko Music", "African Djembe Drums", "Chinese Music of Beijing", "Loud Taiko Drumming of Japan", "Sogoni Coun" by Drums Of The World, Madou Djembe
2012	Hoop	"Mercy In Darkness","Archangel","Titan Dune" by Two Steps from Hell
2012	Ball	"Mission Impossible Theme" by David Garrett
2012	Clubs (New)	"Tamacun", "Diablo Rojo" by Rodrigo Y Gabriela
2012	Clubs (First)	"Angry Birds Main Theme" by London Philharmonic Orchestra & Andrew Skeet
2012	Ribbon	"Asturias" by Joja Wendt
2011	Hoop	"Technologique Park" by Orbital
2011	Ball	"Private Investigation" by Dire Straits
2011	Clubs	"No Hay Problema" by Pink Martini
2011	Ribbon	"España Caní", "España Caní" by Manhattan Pops Orchestra, Trio Norté

== Detailed Olympic results ==
Year	Competition Description	Location	Music	Apparatus	Score-Final	Score-Qualifying
2012	Olympics	London		All-around	109.625	110.025
2012	Olympics	London	Asturias by Joja Wendt	Ribbon	27.450	26.800
2012	Olympics	London	Mission Impossible Theme by David Garrett	Ball	26.675	28.125
2012	Olympics	London	Mercy In Darkness, Archangel, Titan Dune by Two Steps From Hell	Hoop	27.950	27.300
2012	Olympics	London	Tamacun, Diablo Rojo by Rodrigo y Gabriela	Clubs	27.550	27.800

Year	Competition Description	Location	Music	Apparatus	Score-Final	Score-Qualifying
2008	Olympics	Beijing		Group All-around	31.100	31.625
2008	Olympics	Beijing	Summer by Antonio Vivaldi	5 Ropes	15.975	15.800
2008	Olympics	Beijing	Theme music from Avrora by Valeri Tishler	3 Hoops / 2 Clubs	15.125	15.825
