= Deriugins School =

Gymnastics club in Kyiv, Ukraine

Olympic medal record

Rhythmic gymnastics

Aeon Cup
Gold medal – first place	2025	
Silver medal – second place	2001	
Silver medal – second place	2004	
Silver medal – second place	2005	
Silver medal – second place	2006	
Silver medal – second place	2007	
Silver medal – second place	2008	
Silver medal – second place	2015	
Silver medal – second place	2019	
Silver medal – second place	2022	
Silver medal – second place	2023	
Silver medal – second place	2024	
Bronze medal – third place	1999	
Bronze medal – third place	2003	
Bronze medal – third place	2010	
Bronze medal – third place	2011	
Bronze medal – third place	2014	
Bronze medal – third place	2016	
Bronze medal – third place	2026	

The Deriugina School, also known as the Deriugins' School, is a rhythmic gymnastics club in Kyiv, Ukraine. It was run for many years by the mother and daughter team of Albina Deriugina, who was the head coach for many years and died in 2023 at the age of 91, and Irina Deriugina, who acted as the assistant coach and later became the head coach. Irina's daughter, Iryna Blokhina, works in the school as a senior choreographer.

Every year since 1992 the club plays host to the biggest rhythmic gymnastics competition in Ukraine, The Deriugina Cup (Кубок Дерюгіної).

The main training centre of the club is the October Palace in Kyiv.

== History ==
In the 1970s Deriugina gymnasts comprised the majority of the Soviet team with the Deriugina gymnasts becoming Soviet, European and World champions. During this era the most notable individual gymnast was, Irina Deriugina — the 1977 and 1979 World champion. The school was very strong in the groups discipline during this period with European and World titles for the group, consisting of Viktoria Serykh, Olga Plokhova, Ludmila Yevtushenko, Olga Shchegoleva, Zhanna Vasyura and Irina Deriugina.

Ten years after the school's initial success, it had a few more champions to give. Aleksandra Timoshenko become the Bronze medal winner at the 1988 Olympics and the Champion at 1992 Olympics. She became the role model for the über-waif rhythmic gymnast look. Along with Timoshenko, the school produced Oksana Skaldina who went on to claim the bronze medal at the 1992 Summer Olympics, with Timoshenko taking the gold.

Throughout the 1990s the Deriugina School produced numerous champions and gymnasts of interest. Gymnasts such as Ekaterina Serebrianskaya and Elena Vitrichenko dominated the mid-1990s. The school had a big emergence of talent in the late 1990s and early 2000s led by Tamara Yerofeeva and the daughter of Viktoria Serykh, Anna Bessonova.

During the late 2013/early 2014 Euromaidan-protest in Kyiv, the school changed training halls several times and their main training centre October Palace became occupied by protesters. According to Deriugins School pupil Ganna Rizatdinova after Euromaidan they discovered that school equipment "like a TV set and a kettle, balls and clubs" had disappeared; "it was a strange kind of robbery. We don’t know who did it.”

In the early 2020s, former gymnasts Natalia Godunko and Valeriya Yuzvyak alleged that the Deriuginas were psychologically and physically abusive. Godunko alleged that she had undergone mental abuse and witnessed physical abuse against other gymnasts, that extreme weight control caused a gymnast to be hospitalized, and that the coaches did not believe gymnasts when they were in pain or injured. Yuzvyak said that gymnasts were often subject to obscenities and physical violence during training.

== Notable alumni ==
- Irina Deriugina - 1977 All around World Champion, 1979 All around World Champion.
- Olexandra Tymoshenko - 1992 All around Olympic Champion, 1988 All around European Champion (shared with Adriana Dunavska &
- Oksana Skaldina - 1991 All around World Champion, 1992 All around Olympic bronze medalist
- Ekaterina Serebrianskaya - 1995 European Cup Final Champion, 1995 All around World Champion (with Maria Petrova), 1996 All around European Champion, 1996 All around Olympic Champion.
- Victoria Stadnik - 1995 World Championships Teams Competition bronze medalist.
- Tamara Yerofeeva - 2001 All around World Champion, 2002 World Cup Final All around winner, 2002 All around European Silver medalist, 2001 All around World Universiade winner
- Anna Bessonova - 2007 All around World Champion, two-time All around Olympic bronze medalist (2004 Athens, 2008 Beijing)
- Natalia Godunko - 2005 European Champion in ribbon and 2006 World Cup Final Champion in rope.
- Alina Maksymenko - 2013 World Championship 3rd in final clubs.
- Ganna Rizatdinova - 2016 Olympic bronze medalist, 2013 World All around silver medalist, Gold medal in hoop.
- Viktoriia Mazur - 3 time World Team Competition bronze medalist.
- Anastasiia Mulmina - 3 time Universiade medalist
- Eleonora Romanova - 2014 World Championships Teams Competition bronze medalist (with Ganna Rizatdinova and Viktoria Mazur).
- Olena Diachenko - 2 time Grand Prix Final medalist
- Kateryna Lutsenko - 2 time Universiade medalist
- Viktoriia Onopriienko
- Taisiia Onofriichuk

== See also ==
- Ukrainian Federation of Rhythmic Gymnastics
