= Albina Deriugina =

Soviet and Ukrainian gymnastics coach (1932–2023)

Deriugina in her youth

Albina Nikolaevna Deriugina (Ukrainian: Альбі́на Микола́ївна Дерю́гіна, romanized: Albina Mykolayivna Deriuhina, 16 March 1932 – 29 March 2023) was a Soviet and Ukrainian rhythmic gymnastics coach. She trained her daughter Irina Deriugina to Olympic success and the two then became a very successful coaching team. She was made a Hero of Ukraine in 2002.

== Career ==
Albina Deriugina was born 1932 in Makiivka. She married Ivan Deriuhin (an Olympic gold medallist in modern pentathlon) and they brought up a daughter, Irina Deriugina. Albina became the Soviet rhythmic gymnastics coach and coached Iryna to all-round gold medals at both the 1977 World Rhythmic Gymnastics Championships and 1979 World Rhythmic Gymnastics Championships.

After Iryna stepped down from competition at the age of 24, mother and daughter combined as a highly successful coaching team, creating a private school and training athletes who won a total of 120 gold medals. The Deriuginas coached among others Hanna Rizatdinova.

== Accolades ==
Albina Deriugina is regarded as a legendary figure in gymnastics. In 1995, Irina Deriugina established the Deriugina Cup, an international gymnastics competition in Kyiv, in tribute to her mother.

She was made a Hero of Ukraine, the highest civilian award in Ukraine, in 2002. In 2015, the National Olympic Committee of Ukraine celebrated its 25th anniversary and presented Deriugina with its highest award, the NOC medal.
