= List of gymnasts at the 2012 Summer Olympics =

This is a list of the gymnasts who represented their country at the 2012 Summer Olympics in London from 27 July to 12 August 2012. Gymnasts across three disciplines (artistic gymnastics, rhythmic gymnastics, and trampoline) participated in the Games.

== Women's artistic gymnastics ==
	Name	Country	Date of birth (Age)
Youngest competitor	Anne Kuhm	France	17 December 1996 (age 15)
Oldest competitor	Oksana Chusovitina	Germany	19 June 1975 (age 37)

NOC	Name	Birth date	Hometown
Argentina	Valeria Pereyra	12 February 1996 (aged 16)	Buenos Aires, Argentina
Australia	Georgia Bonora	19 May 1990 (aged 22)	Fitzroy, Victoria
Australia	Ashleigh Brennan	18 January 1991 (aged 21)	Melbourne, Victoria
Australia	Emily Little	29 March 1994 (aged 18)	Subiaco, Western Australia
Australia	Larrissa Miller	12 June 1992 (aged 20)	Melbourne, Victoria
Australia	Lauren Mitchell	23 July 1991 (aged 21)	Subiaco, Western Australia
Austria	Barbara Gasser	30 August 1989 (aged 22)	Bregenz, Austria
Belarus	Nastassia Marachkouskaya	19 September 1990 (aged 21)	Minsk, Belarus
Belgium	Gaelle Mys	16 November 1991 (aged 20)	Ghent, Belgium
Brazil	Harumy de Freitas	24 June 1995 (aged 17)	Curitiba, Brazil
Brazil	Daiane dos Santos	10 February 1983 (aged 29)	Porto Alegre, Brazil
Brazil	Ethiene Franco	27 April 1992 (aged 20)	Curitiba, Brazil
Brazil	Daniele Hypólito	8 September 1984 (aged 27)	Santo André, Brazil
Brazil	Bruna Leal	24 April 1993 (aged 19)	Rio de Janeiro, Brazil
Bulgaria	Ralitsa Mileva	22 December 1993 (aged 18)	Sofia, Bulgaria
Canada	Ellie Black	8 September 1995 (aged 16)	Halifax, Nova Scotia
Canada	Victoria Moors	5 November 1996 (aged 15)	Surrey, British Columbia
Canada	Dominique Pegg	24 May 1995 (aged 17)	London, Ontario
Canada	Brittany Rogers	8 June 1993 (aged 19)	Coquitlam, British Columbia
Canada	Kristina Vaculik	9 July 1992 (aged 20)	Toronto, Ontario
Chile	Simona Castro	11 January 1989 (aged 23)	Santiago, Chile
China	Deng Linlin	21 April 1992 (aged 20)	Fuyang, Anhui
China	He Kexin	1 January 1992 (aged 20)	Beijing, China
China	Huang Qiushuang	28 May 1992 (aged 20)	Xiangyang, Hubei
China	Sui Lu	1 April 1992 (aged 20)	Zhuzhou, Hunan
China	Yao Jinnan	8 February 1995 (aged 17)	Fuzhou, Fujian
Colombia	Jessica Gil Ortiz	7 December 1990 (aged 21)	Miami, Florida
Croatia	Tina Erceg	3 May 1988 (aged 24)	Split, Croatia
Czech Republic	Kristýna Pálešová	22 February 1991 (aged 21)	Ivančice, Czech Republic
Dominican Republic	Yamilet Peña	14 December 1992 (aged 19)	Santo Domingo, Dominican Republic
Egypt	Sherine El-Zeiny	23 February 1991 (aged 21)	Amsterdam, Netherlands
Egypt	Salma Mohamed	1 October 1991 (aged 20)	Giza, Egypt
Finland	Annika Urvikko	17 November 1990 (aged 21)	Tampere, Finland
France	Mira Boumejmajen	6 June 1995 (aged 17)	Vierzon, France
France	Youna Dufournet	19 October 1993 (aged 18)	Saumur, France
France	Anne Kuhm	17 December 1996 (aged 15)	Haguenau, France
France	Aurélie Malaussena	17 October 1993 (aged 18)	Grasse, France
France	Sophia Serseri	1 December 1995 (aged 16)	Chenôve, France
Germany	Janine Berger	21 April 1996 (aged 16)	Dillingen an der Donau, Germany
Germany	Kim Bui	20 January 1989 (aged 23)	Tübingen, Germany
Germany	Oksana Chusovitina	19 June 1975 (aged 37)	Bukhara, Uzbekistan
Germany	Nadine Jarosch	28 April 1995 (aged 17)	Bielefeld, Germany
Germany	Elisabeth Seitz	4 November 1993 (aged 18)	Heidelberg, Germany
Great Britain	Imogen Cairns	26 January 1989 (aged 23)	Bristol, England
Great Britain	Jennifer Pinches	25 May 1994 (aged 18)	Royal Tunbridge Wells, England
Great Britain	Rebecca Tunney	26 October 1996 (aged 15)	Ashton-under-Lyne, England
Great Britain	Beth Tweddle	1 April 1985 (aged 27)	Bunbury, England
Great Britain	Hannah Whelan	1 July 1992 (aged 20)	Stockport, England
Greece	Vasiliki Millousi	4 May 1984 (aged 28)	Athens, Greece
Guatemala	Ana Sofía Gómez	24 November 1995 (aged 16)	Guatemala City, Guatemala
Hong Kong	Wong Hiu Ying	11 May 1987 (aged 25)	Hong Kong
Hungary	Dorina Böczögő	15 February 1992 (aged 20)	Orosháza, Hungary
Israel	Valeria Maksyuta	27 September 1987 (aged 24)	Kyiv, Ukraine
Italy	Giorgia Campana	16 May 1995 (aged 17)	Rome, Italy
Italy	Erika Fasana	17 February 1996 (aged 16)	Como, Italy
Italy	Carlotta Ferlito	15 February 1995 (aged 17)	Milan, Italy
Italy	Vanessa Ferrari	10 November 1990 (aged 21)	Genivolta, Italy
Italy	Elisabetta Preziosa	21 September 1993 (aged 18)	Saronno, Italy
Japan	Yu Minobe	23 February 1990 (aged 22)	Komatsu, Japan
Japan	Yuko Shintake	20 April 1991 (aged 21)	Osaka, Japan
Japan	Rie Tanaka	11 June 1987 (aged 25)	Iwade, Japan
Japan	Asuka Teramoto	19 November 1995 (aged 16)	Komaki, Japan
Japan	Kōko Tsurumi	28 September 1992 (aged 19)	Saitama, Japan
Kazakhstan	Moldir Azimbay	2 December 1995 (aged 16)	Shymkent, Kazakhstan
Lithuania	Laura Švilpaitė	7 January 1994 (aged 18)	Vilnius, Lithuania
Mexico	Elsa García	8 February 1990 (aged 22)	Monterrey, Nuevo León
Netherlands	Céline van Gerner	1 December 1994 (aged 17)	Zwolle, Netherlands
Poland	Marta Pihan-Kulesza	23 July 1987 (aged 25)	Szczecin, Poland
Portugal	Zoi Lima	7 October 1991 (aged 20)	Toronto, Ontario
Puerto Rico	Lorena Quiñones	26 July 1996 (aged 16)	Humacao, Puerto Rico
Romania	Diana Bulimar	22 August 1995 (aged 16)	Timișoara, Romania
Romania	Diana Chelaru	15 August 1993 (aged 18)	Onești, Romania
Romania	Larisa Iordache	19 June 1996 (aged 16)	Bucharest, Romania
Romania	Sandra Izbașa	18 June 1990 (aged 22)	Bucharest, Romania
Romania	Cătălina Ponor	20 August 1987 (aged 24)	Constanța, Romania
Russia	Ksenia Afanasyeva	13 September 1991 (aged 20)	Tula, Russia
Russia	Anastasia Grishina	16 January 1996 (aged 16)	Moscow, Russia
Russia	Viktoria Komova	30 January 1995 (aged 17)	Voronezh, Russia
Russia	Aliya Mustafina	30 September 1994 (aged 17)	Yegoryevsk, Russia
Russia	Maria Paseka	19 July 1995 (aged 17)	Moscow, Russia
Singapore	Lim Heem Wei	12 April 1989 (aged 23)	Singapore
Slovakia	Mária Homolová	29 September 1987 (aged 24)	Zvolen, Slovakia
Slovenia	Saša Golob	17 August 1991 (aged 20)	Ljubljana, Slovenia
South Korea	Heo Seon-mi	15 January 1995 (aged 17)	Seoul, South Korea
Spain	Ana María Izurieta	13 January 1993 (aged 19)	Guayaquil, Ecuador
Sweden	Jonna Adlerteg	6 June 1995 (aged 17)	Västerås, Sweden
Switzerland	Giulia Steingruber	24 March 1994 (aged 18)	Gossau, Switzerland
Turkey	Göksu Üçtaş	30 August 1990 (aged 21)	Şahinbey, Turkey
Ukraine	Natalia Kononenko	25 August 1994 (aged 17)	Kyiv, Ukraine
United States	Gabby Douglas	31 December 1995 (aged 16)	Newport News, Virginia
United States	McKayla Maroney	9 December 1995 (aged 16)	Aliso Viejo, California
United States	Aly Raisman	25 May 1994 (aged 18)	Needham, Massachusetts
United States	Kyla Ross	24 October 1996 (aged 15)	Honolulu, Hawaii
United States	Jordyn Wieber	12 July 1995 (aged 17)	DeWitt, Michigan
Uzbekistan	Luiza Galiulina	23 June 1992 (aged 20)	Tashkent, Uzbekistan
Venezuela	Jessica López	22 January 1986 (aged 26)	Caracas, Venezuela
Vietnam	Đỗ Thị Ngân Thương	10 March 1989 (aged 23)	Hanoi, Vietnam
Vietnam	Phan Thị Hà Thanh	16 October 1991 (aged 20)	Haiphong, Vietnam

== Men's artistic gymnastics ==
	Name	Country	Date of birth (Age)
Youngest competitor	Oleg Stepko	Ukraine	25 March 1994 (aged 18)
Oldest competitor	Yordan Yovchev	Bulgaria	24 February 1973 (aged 39)

NOC	Name	Date of birth (Age)	Hometown
Argentina	Federico Molinari	11 January 1984 (aged 28)	Rosario, Argentina
Armenia	Artur Davtyan	8 August 1992 (aged 19)	Yerevan, Armenia
Australia	Joshua Jefferis	29 August 1985 (aged 26)	Brisbane, Queensland
Austria	Fabian Leimlehner	17 September 1987 (aged 24)	Liestal, Switzerland
Azerbaijan	Shakir Shikhaliyev	19 November 1990 (aged 21)	Baku, Azerbaijan
Bangladesh	Syque Caesar	22 August 1990 (aged 21)	Port St. Lucie, Florida
Belarus	Dmitry Kasperovich	15 October 1977 (aged 34)	Minsk, Belarus
Belgium	Jimmy Verbaeys	26 August 1993 (aged 18)	Uccle, Belgium
Brazil	Diego Hypólito	19 June 1986 (aged 26)	Rio de Janeiro, Brazil
Brazil	Sérgio Sasaki	31 March 1992 (aged 20)	São Bernardo do Campo, Brazil
Brazil	Arthur Zanetti	16 April 1990 (aged 22)	São Caetano do Sul, Brazil
Bulgaria	Yordan Yovchev	24 February 1973 (aged 39)	Plovdiv, Bulgaria
Canada	Nathan Gafuik	12 June 1985 (aged 27)	Calgary, Alberta
Chile	Tomás González	22 November 1985 (aged 26)	Santiago, Chile
China	Chen Yibing	19 December 1984 (aged 27)	Tianjin, China
China	Feng Zhe	19 November 1987 (aged 24)	Chengdu, Sichuan
China	Guo Weiyang	1 February 1988 (aged 24)	Yuxi, Yunnan
China	Zhang Chenglong	12 May 1989 (aged 23)	Binzhou, Shandong
China	Zou Kai	25 February 1988 (aged 24)	Luzhou, China
Colombia	Jorge Hugo Giraldo	5 September 1979 (aged 32)	Medellín, Colombia
Croatia	Filip Ude	3 June 1986 (aged 26)	Čakovec, Croatia
Czech Republic	Martin Konečný	6 August 1984 (aged 27)	Prague, Czech Republic
Egypt	Mohamed El-Saharty	26 July 1990 (aged 22)	Giza, Egypt
France	Pierre-Yves Bény	12 February 1983 (aged 29)	Lille, France
France	Yann Cucherat	2 October 1979 (aged 32)	Lyon, France
France	Gaël da Silva	30 December 1984 (aged 27)	Vaulx-en-Velin, France
France	Hamilton Sabot	31 May 1987 (aged 25)	Cagnes-sur-Mer, France
France	Cyril Tommasone	4 July 1987 (aged 25)	Lyon, France
Germany	Philipp Boy	23 July 1987 (aged 25)	Schwedt, Germany
Germany	Fabian Hambüchen	25 October 1987 (aged 24)	Wetzlar, Germany
Germany	Sebastian Krimmer	21 June 1990 (aged 22)	Stuttgart, Germany
Germany	Marcel Nguyen	8 September 1987 (aged 24)	Munich, Germany
Germany	Andreas Toba	7 October 1990 (aged 21)	Gehrden, Germany
Great Britain	Sam Oldham	17 February 1993 (aged 19)	Nottingham, England
Great Britain	Daniel Purvis	13 November 1990 (aged 21)	Liverpool, England
Great Britain	Louis Smith	22 April 1989 (aged 23)	Peterborough, England
Great Britain	Kristian Thomas	14 February 1989 (aged 23)	Wolverhampton, England
Great Britain	Max Whitlock	13 January 1993 (aged 19)	Hemel Hempstead, England
Greece	Vlasios Maras	31 March 1983 (aged 29)	Athens, Greece
Greece	Vasileios Tsolakidis	9 September 1979 (aged 32)	Thessaloniki, Greece
Hong Kong	Shek Wai Hung	10 October 1991 (aged 20)	Hong Kong
Hungary	Krisztián Berki	18 March 1985 (aged 27)	Budapest, Hungary
Hungary	Vid Hidvégi	23 August 1986 (aged 25)	Budapest, Hungary
Ireland	Kieran Behan	19 April 1989 (aged 23)	Croydon, England
Israel	Felix Aronovich	18 July 1988 (aged 24)	Odesa, Ukraine
Israel	Alexander Shatilov	22 March 1987 (aged 25)	Herzliya, Israel
Italy	Matteo Angioletti	8 November 1980 (aged 31)	Monza, Italy
Italy	Alberto Busnari	4 October 1978 (aged 33)	Melzo, Italy
Italy	Matteo Morandi	8 October 1981 (aged 30)	Vimercate, Italy
Italy	Paolo Ottavi	7 January 1986 (aged 26)	Ascoli Piceno, Italy
Italy	Enrico Pozzo	12 February 1981 (aged 31)	Biella, Italy
Japan	Ryōhei Katō	9 September 1993 (aged 18)	Tokyo, Japan
Japan	Kazuhito Tanaka	16 May 1985 (aged 27)	Wakayama, Japan
Japan	Yusuke Tanaka	29 November 1989 (aged 22)	Saitama, Japan
Japan	Kōhei Uchimura	3 January 1989 (aged 23)	Isahaya, Japan
Japan	Koji Yamamuro	17 January 1989 (aged 23)	Koga, Japan
Kazakhstan	Stepan Gorbachev	2 October 1983 (aged 28)	Almaty, Kazakhstan
Latvia	Dmitrijs Trefilovs	13 May 1987 (aged 25)	Riga, Latvia
Lithuania	Rokas Guščinas	6 January 1991 (aged 21)	Kaunas, Lithuania
Mexico	Daniel Corral	25 January 1990 (aged 22)	Ensenada, Baja California
Netherlands	Epke Zonderland	16 April 1986 (aged 26)	Lemmer, Netherlands
Poland	Roman Kulesza	2 March 1983 (aged 29)	Gdańsk, Poland
Portugal	Manuel Campos	12 July 1981 (aged 31)	Porto, Portugal
Puerto Rico	Tommy Ramos	29 April 1986 (aged 26)	Bayamón, Puerto Rico
Romania	Cristian Bățagă	10 April 1988 (aged 24)	Târgu Mureș, Romania
Romania	Marius Berbecar	15 May 1985 (aged 27)	Bistrița, Romania
Romania	Ovidiu Buidoso	13 July 1987 (aged 25)	Bocșa, Romania
Romania	Vlad Cotuna	4 November 1990 (aged 21)	Timișoara, Romania
Romania	Flavius Koczi	26 August 1987 (aged 24)	Reșița, Romania
Russia	Denis Ablyazin	3 August 1992 (aged 19)	Penza, Russia
Russia	Aleksandr Balandin	20 June 1989 (aged 23)	Petrozavodsk, Russia
Russia	David Belyavskiy	23 February 1992 (aged 20)	Votkinsk, Russia
Russia	Emin Garibov	8 September 1990 (aged 21)	Moscow, Russia
Russia	Igor Pakhomenko	10 June 1992 (aged 20)	Novosibirsk, Russia
Slovakia	Samuel Piasecký	31 October 1984 (aged 27)	Košice, Slovakia
South Korea	Kim Hui-hun	22 November 1991 (aged 20)	Seoul, South Korea
South Korea	Kim Ji-hoon	9 August 1984 (aged 27)	Seoul, South Korea
South Korea	Kim Seung-il	9 May 1985 (aged 27)	Seoul, South Korea
South Korea	Kim Soo-myun	4 November 1986 (aged 25)	Pohang, South Korea
South Korea	Yang Hak-seon	6 December 1992 (aged 19)	Seoul, South Korea
Spain	Isaac Botella	12 June 1984 (aged 28)	Elche, Spain
Spain	Javier Gómez Fuertes	5 December 1986 (aged 25)	Mataró, Spain
Spain	Fabián González	8 May 1992 (aged 20)	Palma de Mallorca, Spain
Spain	Rubén López	28 November 1990 (aged 21)	Sabadell, Spain
Spain	Sergio Muñoz	30 August 1989 (aged 22)	Soria, Spain
Switzerland	Claudio Capelli	16 November 1986 (aged 25)	Bern, Switzerland
Tunisia	Wajdi Bouallègue	9 February 1982 (aged 30)	Tunis, Tunisia
Ukraine	Nikolai Kuksenkov	2 June 1989 (aged 23)	Kyiv, Ukraine
Ukraine	Vitaliy Nakonechnyi	2 August 1986 (aged 25)	Kalush, Ukraine
Ukraine	Igor Radivilov	19 October 1992 (aged 19)	Mariupol, Ukraine
Ukraine	Oleg Stepko	25 March 1994 (aged 18)	Zaporizhzhia, Ukraine
Ukraine	Oleg Verniaiev	29 September 1993 (aged 18)	Donetsk, Ukraine
United States	Jake Dalton	19 August 1991 (aged 20)	Reno, Nevada
United States	Jonathan Horton	31 December 1985 (aged 26)	Houston, Texas
United States	Danell Leyva	30 October 1991 (aged 20)	Miami, Florida
United States	Sam Mikulak	13 October 1992 (aged 19)	Newport Coast, California
United States	John Orozco	30 December 1992 (aged 19)	The Bronx, New York
Vietnam	Phạm Phước Hưng	16 June 1988 (aged 24)	Hanoi, Vietnam

== Rhythmic gymnasts ==
=== Individual ===
	Name	Country	Date of birth (Age)
Youngest competitor	Jana Berezko-Marggrander	Germany	17 October 1995 (aged 16)
Oldest competitor	Julieta Cantaluppi	Italy	24 January 1985 (aged 27)

NOC	Name	Date of birth (Age)	Hometown
Australia	Janine Murray	10 March 1990 (aged 22)	Harare, Zimbabwe
Austria	Caroline Weber	31 May 1986 (aged 26)	Dornbirn, Austria
Azerbaijan	Aliya Garayeva	1 January 1988 (aged 24)	Yekaterinburg, Russia
Belarus	Liubov Charkashyna	23 December 1987 (aged 24)	Brest, Belarus
Belarus	Melitina Staniouta	15 November 1993 (aged 18)	Minsk, Belarus
Bulgaria	Silvia Miteva	24 June 1986 (aged 26)	Ruse, Bulgaria
China	Deng Senyue	5 February 1992 (aged 20)	Baise, Guangxi
Cyprus	Chrystalleni Trikomiti	30 November 1993 (aged 18)	Larnaca, Cyprus
Egypt	Yasmine Rostom	25 July 1993 (aged 19)	Alexandria, Egypt
France	Delphine Ledoux	15 May 1985 (aged 27)	Calais, France
Germany	Jana Berezko-Marggrander	17 October 1995 (aged 16)	Tolyatti, Russia
Great Britain	Francesca Jones	9 November 1990 (aged 21)	Kettering, England
Israel	Neta Rivkin	19 June 1991 (aged 21)	Petah Tikva, Israel
Italy	Julieta Cantaluppi	24 January 1985 (aged 27)	Como, Italy
Kazakhstan	Anna Alyabyeva	13 November 1993 (aged 18)	Nur-Sultan, Kazakhstan
Poland	Joanna Mitrosz	21 August 1988 (aged 23)	Gdynia, Poland
Russia	Darya Dmitriyeva	22 June 1993 (aged 19)	Irkutsk, Russia
Russia	Evgeniya Kanaeva	2 April 1990 (aged 22)	Omsk, Russia
South Korea	Son Yeon-jae	28 May 1994 (aged 18)	Seoul, South Korea
Spain	Carolina Rodríguez	24 May 1986 (aged 26)	León, Spain
Ukraine	Alina Maksymenko	10 July 1991 (aged 21)	Zaporizhzhia, Ukraine
Ukraine	Ganna Rizatdinova	16 July 1993 (aged 19)	Simferopol, Crimea
United States	Julie Zetlin	30 June 1990 (aged 22)	Silver Spring, Maryland
Uzbekistan	Ulyana Trofimova	28 February 1990 (aged 22)	Navoiy, Uzbekistan

=== Group ===
	Name	Country	Date of birth (Age)
Youngest competitor	Aliaksandra Narkevich	Belarus	22 December 1995 (aged 16)
Oldest competitor	Romina Laurito	Italy	4 May 1987 (aged 25)

NOC	Name	Date of birth (Age)	Hometown
Belarus	Maryna Hancharova	27 February 1990 (aged 22)	Minsk, Belarus
Belarus	Anastasia Ivankova	22 November 1991 (aged 20)	Minsk, Belarus
Belarus	Nataliya Leshchyk	25 July 1995 (aged 17)	Minsk, Belarus
Belarus	Aliaksandra Narkevich	22 December 1995 (aged 16)	Minsk, Belarus
Belarus	Ksenia Sankovich	27 July 1990 (aged 22)	Minsk, Belarus
Belarus	Alina Tumilovich	21 April 1990 (aged 22)	Minsk, Belarus
Bulgaria	Reneta Kamberova	12 September 1990 (aged 21)	Pazardzhik, Bulgaria
Bulgaria	Mihaela Maevska	4 October 1990 (aged 21)	Sofia, Bulgaria
Bulgaria	Tsvetelina Naydenova	28 April 1994 (aged 18)	Sofia, Bulgaria
Bulgaria	Elena Todorova	1 July 1994 (aged 18)	Targovishte, Bulgaria
Bulgaria	Hristiana Todorova	28 November 1994 (aged 17)	Sofia, Bulgaria
Bulgaria	Katrin Velkova	16 August 1991 (aged 20)	Sofia, Bulgaria
Canada	Katrina Cameron	9 May 1995 (aged 17)	Mississauga, Ontario
Canada	Rose Cossar	4 July 1991 (aged 21)	Toronto, Ontario
Canada	Alexandra Landry	10 February 1994 (aged 18)	Montreal, Quebec
Canada	Anastasiya Muntyanu	13 October 1994 (aged 17)	Chernivtsi, Ukraine
Canada	Anjelika Reznik	25 June 1995 (aged 17)	Almaty, Kazakhstan
Canada	Kelsey Titmarsh	27 December 1993 (aged 18)	Toronto, Ontario
Germany	Mira Bimperling	31 March 1994 (aged 18)	Saarlouis, Germany
Germany	Judith Hauser	23 September 1992 (aged 19)	Pforzheim, Germany
Germany	Nicole Müller	14 November 1994 (aged 17)	Hamburg, Germany
Germany	Camilla Pfeffer	24 January 1993 (aged 19)	Filderstadt, Germany
Germany	Cathrin Puhl	4 April 1994 (aged 18)	Lebach, Germany
Germany	Sara Radman	20 July 1993 (aged 19)	Bad Urach, Germany
Great Britain	Georgina Cassar	9 September 1993 (aged 18)	Welwyn Garden City, England
Great Britain	Jade Faulkner	21 December 1993 (aged 18)	Coventry, England
Great Britain	Francesca Fox	13 June 1992 (aged 20)	Trowbridge, England
Great Britain	Lynne Hutchison	10 November 1994 (aged 17)	Tokyo, Japan
Great Britain	Louisa Pouli	29 January 1993 (aged 19)	Corfu, Greece
Great Britain	Rachel Smith	3 January 1993 (aged 19)	Coventry, England
Greece	Eleni Doika	15 November 1995 (aged 16)	Corfu, Greece
Greece	Alexia Kyriazi	15 December 1995 (aged 16)	Marousi, Greece
Greece	Evdokia Loukagkou	26 September 1995 (aged 16)	Thessaloniki, Greece
Greece	Stavroula Samara	8 July 1994 (aged 18)	Thessaloniki, Greece
Greece	Vasileia Zachou	24 April 1994 (aged 18)	Larissa, Greece
Greece	Marianthi Zafeiriou	29 January 1994 (aged 18)	Marousi, Greece
Israel	Moran Buzovski	23 March 1992 (aged 20)	Petah Tikva, Israel
Israel	Viktoriya Koshel	14 April 1991 (aged 21)	Donetsk, Ukraine
Israel	Noa Palatchy	24 May 1994 (aged 18)	Rishon LeZion, Israel
Israel	Marina Shults	18 December 1994 (aged 17)	Chelyabinsk, Russia
Israel	Polina Zakaluzny	21 February 1992 (aged 20)	Ukraine
Israel	Eliora Zholkovski	5 March 1993 (aged 19)	Holon, Israel
Italy	Elisa Blanchi	13 October 1987 (aged 24)	Velletri, Italy
Italy	Romina Laurito	4 May 1987 (aged 25)	Gallarate, Italy
Italy	Marta Pagnini	21 January 1991 (aged 21)	Florence, Italy
Italy	Elisa Santoni	10 December 1987 (aged 24)	Rome, Italy
Italy	Anzhelika Savrayuk	23 August 1989 (aged 22)	Lutsk, Ukraine
Italy	Andreea Stefanescu	13 December 1993 (aged 18)	Iași, Romania
Japan	Natsuki Fukase	10 April 1994 (aged 18)	Akita, Japan
Japan	Airi Hatakeyama	16 August 1994 (aged 17)	Tama, Japan
Japan	Rie Matsubara	21 October 1993 (aged 18)	Gifu, Japan
Japan	Rina Miura	9 May 1994 (aged 18)	Koganei, Japan
Japan	Nina Saeedyokota	2 March 1994 (aged 18)	Tokyo, Japan
Japan	Kotono Tanaka	18 August 1991 (aged 20)	Beppu, Japan
Russia	Anastasia Bliznyuk	28 June 1994 (aged 18)	Zaporizhzhia, Ukraine
Russia	Uliana Donskova	24 August 1992 (aged 19)	Kamensk-Shakhtinsky, Russia
Russia	Ksenia Dudkina	25 February 1995 (aged 17)	Omsk, Russia
Russia	Alina Makarenko	14 January 1995 (aged 17)	Elista, Russia
Russia	Anastasia Nazarenko	17 January 1993 (aged 19)	Kaliningrad, Russia
Russia	Karolina Sevastyanova	25 April 1995 (aged 17)	Kyiv, Ukraine
Spain	Loreto Achaerandio	13 September 1991 (aged 20)	Madrid, Spain
Spain	Sandra Aguilar	9 August 1992 (aged 19)	Madrid, Spain
Spain	Elena López	4 October 1994 (aged 17)	Valencia, Spain
Spain	Lourdes Mohedano	17 June 1995 (aged 17)	Córdoba, Spain
Spain	Alejandra Quereda	24 July 1992 (aged 20)	Alicante, Spain
Spain	Lidia Redondo	7 March 1992 (aged 20)	Granada, Spain
Ukraine	Olena Dmytrash	1 December 1991 (aged 20)	Bila Tserkva, Ukraine
Ukraine	Yevgeniya Gomon	25 March 1995 (aged 17)	Zaporizhzhia, Ukraine
Ukraine	Valeriia Gudym	1 March 1995 (aged 17)	Kyiv, Ukraine
Ukraine	Viktoriya Lenyshyn	25 May 1991 (aged 21)	Lviv, Ukraine
Ukraine	Viktoria Mazur	15 October 1994 (aged 17)	Luhansk, Ukraine
Ukraine	Svitlana Prokopova	3 January 1993 (aged 19)	Donetsk, Ukraine

== Male trampoline gymnasts ==
	Name	Country	Date of birth (Age)
Youngest competitor	Blake Gaudry	Australia	29 November 1991 (aged 20)
Oldest competitor	Yuriy Nikitin	Ukraine	15 July 1978 (aged 34)

NOC	Name	Date of birth (Age)	Hometown
Australia	Blake Gaudry	29 November 1991 (aged 20)	Baulkham Hills, New South Wales
Belarus	Viachaslau Modzel	25 May 1987 (aged 25)	Vitebsk, Belarus
Canada	Jason Burnett	16 December 1986 (aged 25)	Etobicoke, Ontario
China	Dong Dong	13 April 1989 (aged 23)	Zhengzhou, Henan
China	Lu Chunlong	8 April 1989 (aged 23)	Jiangyin, Jiangsu
Denmark	Peter Jensen	5 March 1980 (aged 32)	Copenhagen, Denmark
France	Grégoire Pennes	7 January 1984 (aged 28)	Paris, France
Germany	Henrik Stehlik	29 December 1980 (aged 31)	Salzgitter, Germany
Italy	Flavio Cannone	5 November 1981 (aged 30)	Ponte San Pietro, Italy
Japan	Masaki Ito	2 November 1988 (aged 23)	Nerima, Japan
Japan	Yasuhiro Ueyama	16 October 1984 (aged 27)	Sennan, Japan
Portugal	Diogo Ganchinho	12 September 1987 (aged 24)	Santo Estêvão, Portugal
Russia	Nikita Fedorenko	6 September 1991 (aged 20)	Saratov, Russia
Russia	Dmitry Ushakov	15 August 1988 (aged 23)	Yeysk, Russia
Ukraine	Yuriy Nikitin	15 July 1978 (aged 34)	Kharkiv, Ukraine
United States	Steven Gluckstein	24 June 1990 (aged 22)	Red Bank, New Jersey

== Female trampoline gymnasts ==
	Name	Country	Date of birth (Age)
Youngest competitor	Savannah Vinsant	United States	25 June 1993 (aged 19)
Oldest competitor	Anna Dogonadze	Germany	15 February 1973 (aged 39)

NOC	Name	Birth Date and Age	Hometown
Belarus	Tatsiana Piatrenia	18 October 1981 (aged 30)	Mogilev, Belarus
Canada	Karen Cockburn	2 October 1980 (aged 31)	Toronto, Ontario
Canada	Rosannagh MacLennan	28 August 1988 (aged 23)	King, Ontario
China	He Wenna	19 January 1989 (aged 23)	Xinluo, Fujian
China	Huang Shanshan	18 January 1986 (aged 26)	Fuzhou, Fujian
Czech Republic	Zita Frydrychová	3 December 1991 (aged 20)	Liberec, Czech Republic
Georgia	Luba Golovina	20 April 1990 (aged 22)	Tbilisi, Georgia
Germany	Anna Dogonadze	15 February 1973 (aged 39)	Mtskheta, Georgia
Great Britain	Kat Driscoll	13 March 1986 (aged 26)	Chatham, England
Japan	Ayano Kishi	29 October 1992 (aged 19)	Musashino, Japan
Netherlands	Andrea Lenders	29 December 1980 (aged 31)	Groningen, Netherlands
Portugal	Ana Rente	27 April 1988 (aged 24)	Coimbra, Portugal
Russia	Victoria Voronina	24 February 1988 (aged 24)	Taganrog, Russia
Ukraine	Maryna Kyiko	7 January 1987 (aged 25)	Kyiv, Ukraine
United States	Savannah Vinsant	25 June 1993 (aged 19)	Lafayette, Louisiana
Uzbekistan	Ekaterina Khilko	25 March 1982 (aged 30)	Tashkent, Uzbekistan
