= Gymnastics at the 2012 Summer Olympics – Women's rhythmic group all-around =

Women's rhythmic group all-around at the Games of the XXX Olympiad
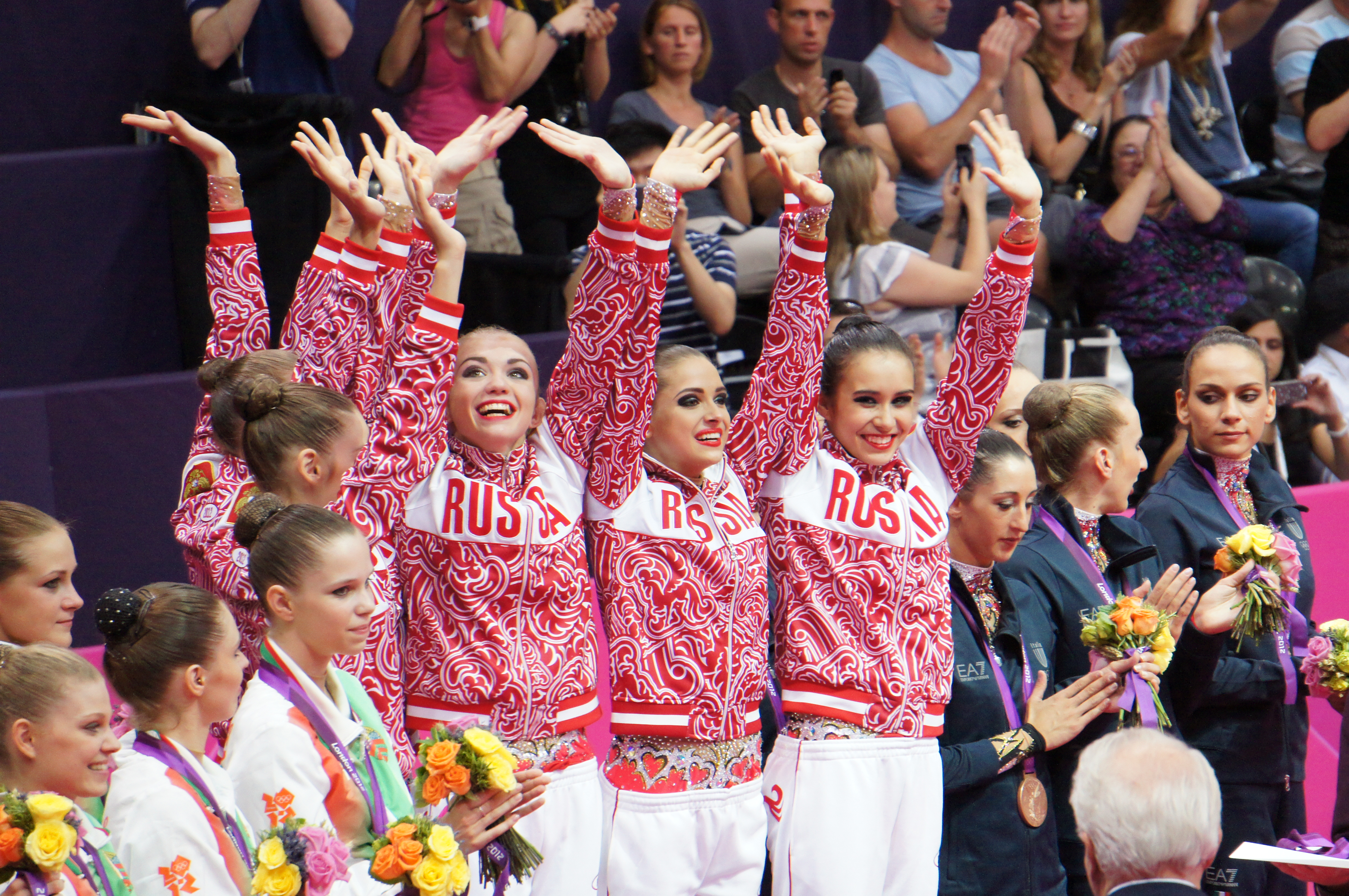
- Women's rhythmic group all-around victory ceremony
- Venue: Wembley Arena
- Date: 9–12 August
- Competitors: 72 from 12 nations
- Winning score: 57.000

Medalists
1st place, gold medalist(s)		Anastasia Bliznyuk; Uliana Donskova; Ksenia Dudkina; Alina Makarenko; Anastasia Nazarenko; Karolina Sevastyanova	Russia
2nd place, silver medalist(s)		Maryna Hancharova; Anastasia Ivankova; Nataliya Leshchyk; Aliaksandra Narkevich; Ksenia Sankovich; Alina Tumilovich	Belarus
3rd place, bronze medalist(s)		Elisa Blanchi; Romina Laurito; Marta Pagnini; Elisa Santoni; Anzhelika Savrayuk; Andreea Stefanescu	Italy

The women's rhythmic group all-around competition at the 2012 Summer Olympics was held at the Wembley Arena from 9–12 August.

== Competition format ==
The competition consisted of a qualification round and a final round. The top eight teams in the qualification round advanced to the final. In each round, the teams performed two routines (one with balls, one with ribbons and hoops), with the scores added to give a total.

== Qualification results ==
Position	Gymnast	5		3 + 2		Total
Position	Gymnast	Score	Penalty	Score	Penalty	Total
1	Russia; Anastasia Bliznyuk; Uliana Donskova; Ksenia Dudkina; Alina Makarenko; Anastasia Nazarenko; Karolina Sevastyanova	28.375		28.000		56.375
2	Italy; Elisa Blanchi; Romina Laurito; Marta Pagnini; Elisa Santoni; Anzhelika Savrayuk; Andreea Stefanescu	28.100		27.700		55.800
3	Belarus; Maryna Hancharova; Anastasia Ivankova; Nataliya Leshchyk; Aliaksandra Narkevich; Ksenia Sankovich; Alina Tumilovich	27.900		26.850		54.750
4	Bulgaria; Reneta Kamberova; Mihaela Maevska; Tsvetelina Naydenova; Elena Todorova; Hristiana Todorova; Katrin Velkova	27.250		27.375		54.625
5	Spain; Loreto Achaerandio; Sandra Aguilar; Elena López; Lourdes Mohedano; Alejandra Quereda; Lidia Redondo	27.150		27.400		54.550
6	Ukraine; Olena Dmytrash; Yevgeniya Gomon; Valeriia Gudym; Viktoriya Lenyshyn; Viktoria Mazur; Svitlana Prokopova	27.050		27.100		54.150
7	Israel; Moran Buzovski; Viktoriya Koshel; Noa Palatchy; Marina Shults; Polina Zakaluzny; Eliora Zholkovski	26.500		26.600		53.100
8	Japan; Natsuki Fukase; Airi Hatakeyama; Rie Matsubara; Rina Miura; Nina Saeedyokota; Kotono Tanaka	26.725		26.300	0.40	53.025
9	Greece; Eleni Doika; Alexia Kyriazi; Evdokia Loukagkou; Stavroula Samara; Vasileia Zachou; Marianthi Zafeiriou	25.875		26.000		51.875
10	Germany; Mira Bimperling; Judith Hauser; Nicole Müller; Camilla Pfeffer; Cathrin Puhl; Sara Radman	24.500		25.150	0.05	49.650
11	Canada; Katrina Cameron; Rose Cossar; Alexandra Landry; Anastasiya Muntyanu; Anjelika Reznik; Kelsey Titmarsh	24.050		23.975		48.025
12	Great Britain; Georgina Cassar; Jade Faulkner; Francesca Fox; Lynne Hutchison; Louisa Pouli; Rachel Smith	24.150		23.850	0.05	48.000

== Final results ==
Position	Gymnast	5		3 + 2		Total
Position	Gymnast	Score	Penalty	Score	Penalty	Total
1st place, gold medalist(s)	Russia; Anastasia Bliznyuk; Uliana Donskova; Ksenia Dudkina; Alina Makarenko; Anastasia Nazarenko; Karolina Sevastyanova	28.700		28.300		57.000
2nd place, silver medalist(s)	Belarus; Maryna Hancharova; Anastasia Ivankova; Nataliya Leshchyk; Aliaksandra Narkevich; Ksenia Sankovich; Alina Tumilovich	27.825		27.675		55.500
3rd place, bronze medalist(s)	Italy; Elisa Blanchi; Romina Laurito; Marta Pagnini; Elisa Santoni; Anzhelika Savrayuk; Andreea Stefanescu	28.125		27.325	0.20	55.450
4	Spain; Loreto Achaerandio; Sandra Aguilar; Elena López; Lourdes Mohedano; Alejandra Quereda; Lidia Redondo	27.400		27.550		54.950
5	Ukraine; Olena Dmytrash; Yevgeniya Gomon; Valeriia Gudym; Viktoriya Lenyshyn; Viktoria Mazur; Svitlana Prokopova	27.200		27.175		54.375
6	Bulgaria; Reneta Kamberova; Mihaela Marvska; Tsvetelina Naydenova; Elena Todorova; Hristiana Todorova; Katrin Velkova	27.950		26.425		54.375
7	Japan; Natsuki Fukase; Airi Hatakeyama; Rie Matsubara; Rina Miura; Nina Saeedyokota; Kotono Tanaka	27.000		27.100		54.100
8	Israel; Moran Buzovski; Viktoriya Koshel; Noa Palatchy; Marina Shults; Polina Zakaluzny; Eliora Zholkovski	26.725		26.675		53.400
