= Israel at the 2012 Summer Olympics =

- IOC code: ISR
- NOC: Olympic Committee of Israel
- Website: www.olympicsil.co.il (in Hebrew and English)

in London
- Competitors: 37 in 9 sports
- Flag bearers: Shahar Tzuberi (opening); Neta Rivkin (closing)
- Medals: Gold 0 Silver 0 Bronze 0 Total 0

Summer Olympics appearances (overview)
- 1952; 1956; 1960; 1964; 1968; 1972; 1976; 1980; 1984; 1988; 1992; 1996; 2000; 2004; 2008; 2012; 2016; 2020; 2024; 2028

Israel competed at the 2012 Summer Olympics in London, from 27 July to 12 August 2012. This was the nation's fifteenth appearance at the Summer Olympics.

The Olympic Committee of Israel sent 37 athletes to the Games, 19 men and 18 women, to compete in 9 sports. The nation's team size was smaller by six athletes from the previous games (in contrast to 43 athletes who competed in Beijing, which was the nation's largest delegation to that point). This was also the youngest delegation in Israel's Olympic history, with about half the team under the age of 23, and many of the team members were expected to reach their peak in time for the 2016 Summer Olympics in Rio de Janeiro. Sixteen athletes had competed in Beijing, including windsurfer and bronze medalist Shahar Tzuberi, who was the nation's flag bearer at the opening ceremony.

Judoka Ariel Ze'evi, four-time European champion and bronze medalist at the 2004 Summer Olympics, became the third Israeli athlete in history to compete at four Olympic games, and was also the oldest athlete on the team, at age 35. Six athletes made their third Olympic appearance: tennis men's doubles team Jonathan Erlich and Andy Ram, synchronized swimming pair Anastasia Gloushkov and Inna Yoffe, and sailors Gideon Kliger, world bronze medalist in the men's 470 class, and Vered Buskila in the women's 470 class.

According to Zvi Warshaviak, the head of the Israel Olympic Committee, approximately eight athletes were considered medal contenders in sailing, gymnastics, judo, and shooting; however, none of them reached their expectations in the results, and Israel failed to win a single medal for the first time since 1988. Windsurfer Lee Korzits, backstroke swimmer Yakov-Yan Toumarkin, floor gymnast Alexander Shatilov, and rhythmic gymnast Neta Rivkin qualified successfully for the final rounds of their respective sports, but missed out of the medal standings.

Prior to the Olympics, the BBC's list of countries competing, did not list Jerusalem as Israel's capital, however listed East Jerusalem as the capital of Palestine. The BBC eventually listed Jerusalem as the capital after mass complaints from the Prime Ministers Office.

== Competitors ==
Sport	Men	Women	Total
Athletics	2	1	3
Badminton	1	0	1
Gymnastics	2	8	10
Judo	4	1	5
Sailing	3	4	7
Shooting	1	0	1
Swimming	4	1	5
Synchronized swimming	0	2	2
Tennis	2	1	3
Total	19	18	37

== Athletics ==
Key

- Note – Ranks given for track events are within the athlete's heat only
- Q = Qualified for the next round
- q = Qualified for the next round as a fastest loser or, in field events, by position without achieving the qualifying target
- NR = National record
- N/A = Round not applicable for the event
- Bye = Athlete not required to compete in round

Men

Athlete	Event	Heat		Semifinal		Final	
Athlete	Event	Result	Rank	Result	Rank	Result	Rank
Donald Sanford	400 m	45.71 NR	5	Did not advance			
Zohar Zemiro	Marathon	—N/a				2:34:59	81

Women

Athlete	Event	Qualification		Final	
Athlete	Event	Distance	Position	Distance	Position
Jillian Schwartz	Pole vault	4.40	18	Did not advance	

== Badminton ==
Athlete	Event	Group stage			Elimination	Quarterfinal	Semifinal	Final / BM	
Athlete	Event	Opposition Score	Opposition Score	Rank	Opposition Score	Opposition Score	Opposition Score	Opposition Score	Rank
Misha Zilberman	Men's singles	Jørgensen (DEN); L 13–21, 12–21	Wong (SIN); L 9–21, 15–21	3	Did not advance				

== Gymnastics ==
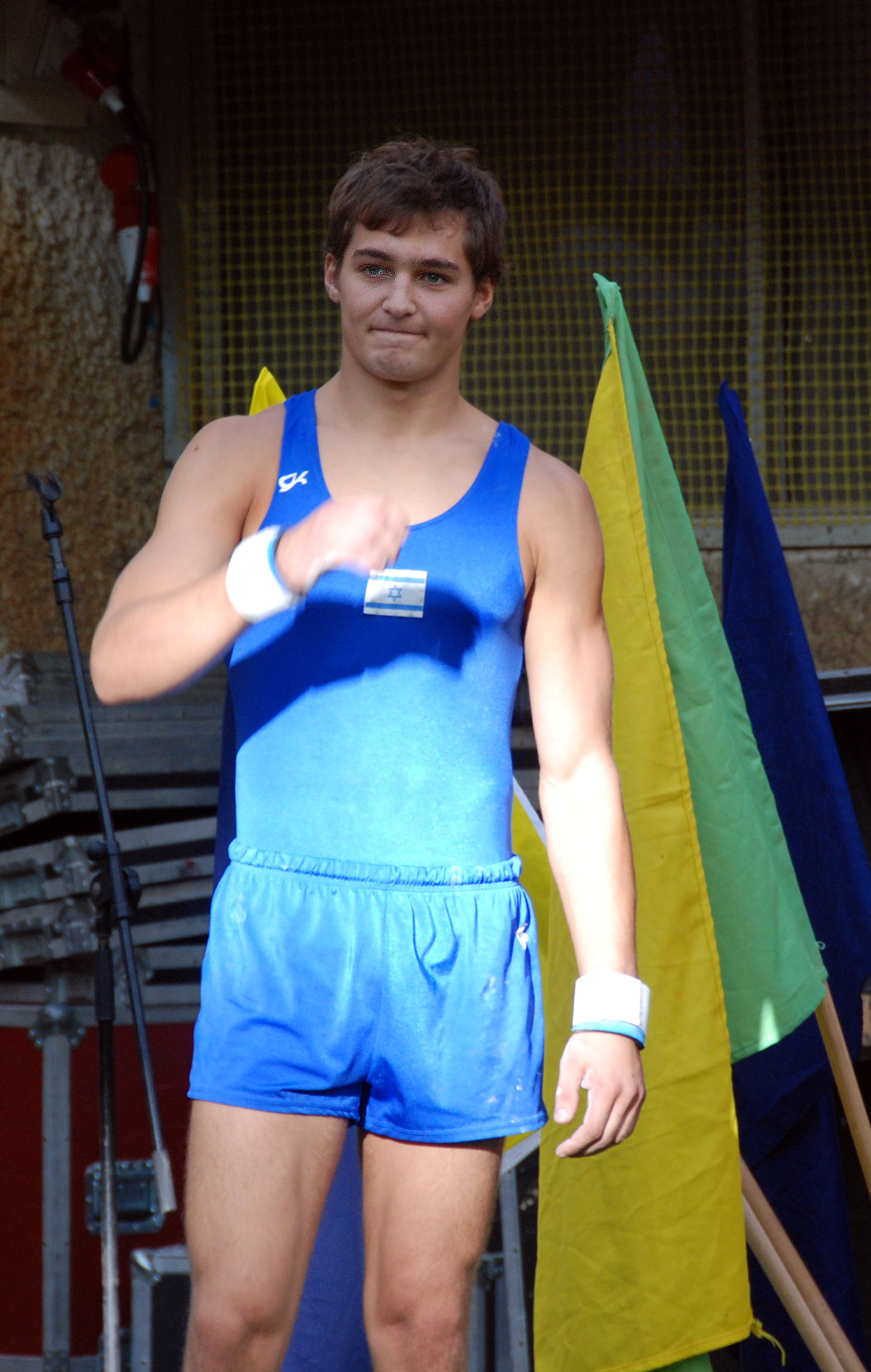
Gymnast Alexander Shatilov

=== Artistic ===
Men

Athlete	Event	Qualification								Final							
Athlete	Event	Apparatus						Total	Rank	Apparatus						Total	Rank
Athlete	Event	F	PH	R	V	PB	HB	Total	Rank	F	PH	R	V	PB	HB	Total	Rank
Felix Aronovich	All-around	14.033	13.433	14.100	13.900	14.233	13.500	83.199	32	Did not advance							
Alexander Shatilov	All-around	15.633	14.133	14.033	15.533	14.700	14.000	89.032	12 Q	15.600	14.266	14.200	15.133	14.400	14.833	88.432	12
Alexander Shatilov	Floor	15.633	—N/a					15.633	4 Q	15.333	—N/a					15.333	6

Women

Athlete	Event	Qualification						Final					
Athlete	Event	Apparatus				Total	Rank	Apparatus				Total	Rank
Athlete	Event	V	UB	BB	F	Total	Rank	F	V	UB	BB	Total	Rank
Valeria Maksyuta	All-around	12.800	9.433	10.533	12.933	45.699	59	Did not advance					

=== Rhythmic ===
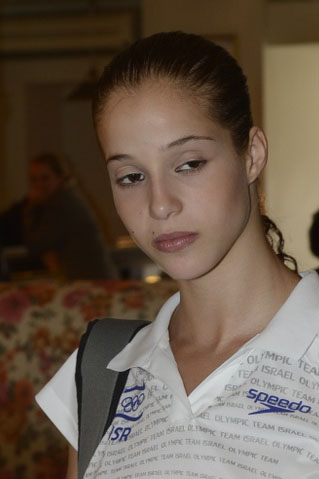
Moran Buzovsky

Athlete	Event	Qualification						Final					
Athlete	Event	Hoop	Ball	Clubs	Ribbon	Total	Rank	Hoop	Ball	Clubs	Ribbon	Total	Rank
Neta Rivkin	Individual	27.450	26.200	27.525	27.725	108.900	9 Q	27.350	26.850	27.800	27.000	109.000	7

Athlete	Event	Qualification				Final			
Athlete	Event	5 balls	3 ribbons 2 hoops	Total	Rank	5 balls	3 ribbons 2 hoops	Total	Rank
Moran Buzovsky; Victoria Koshel; Noa Palathcy; Marina Shultz; Polina Zakaluzny; Eliora Zholkovski	Team	26.500	26.600	53.100	7 Q	26.725	26.675	53.400	8

== Judo ==
Athlete	Event	Round of 64	Round of 32	Round of 16	Quarterfinals	Semifinals	Repechage	Final / BM	
Athlete	Event	Opposition Result	Opposition Result	Opposition Result	Opposition Result	Opposition Result	Opposition Result	Opposition Result	Rank
Artiom Arshansky	Men's −60 kg	Bye	Mooren (NED); W 0001–0001	Hiraoka (JPN); L 0000–0012	Did not advance				
Golan Pollack	Men's −66 kg	Larose (FRA); L 0000–0001	Did not advance						
Soso Palelashvili	Men's −73 kg	Bye	Huysuz (TUR); W 0010–0000	Nakaya (JPN); L 0000–0101	Did not advance				
Ariel Ze'evi	Men's −100 kg	—N/a	Peters (GER); L 0000–1000	Did not advance					
Alice Schlesinger	Women's −63 kg	—N/a	Bye	Drexler (AUT); W 0010-0002	Žolnir (SLO); L 0000-1100	Did not advance	Émane (FRA); L 0002-0010	Did not advance	7

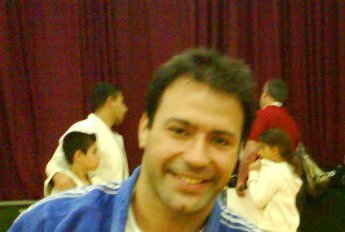
Judoka Ariel Ze'evi

== Sailing ==
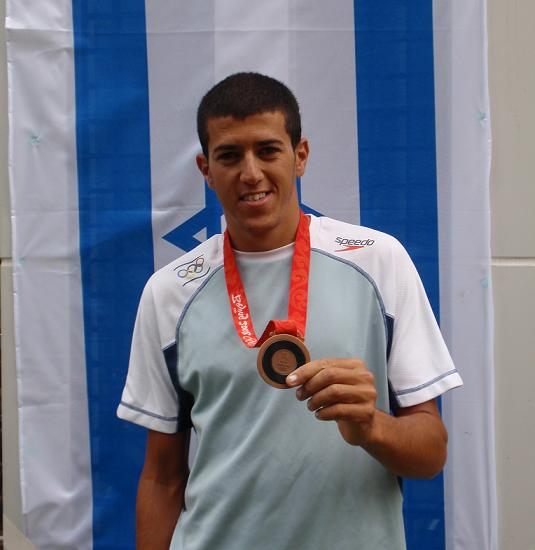
Windsurfer Shahar Tzuberi

Men

Athlete	Event	Race											Net points	Final rank
Athlete	Event	1	2	3	4	5	6	7	8	9	10	M*	Net points	Final rank
Shahar Tzuberi	RS:X	12	8	17	10	~~39~~; ~~BFD~~	12	35	34	26	1	EL	155	19
Gideon Kliger; Eran Sela	470	17	11	17	11	2	14	5	12	~~28~~; ~~OCS~~	23	EL	112	15

Women

Athlete	Event	Race											Net points	Final rank
Athlete	Event	1	2	3	4	5	6	7	8	9	10	M*	Net points	Final rank
Lee Korzits	RS:X	1	3	7	2	2	~~11~~	2	1	9	11	18	56	6
Nufar Edelman	Laser Radial	33	33	33	~~34~~	29	3	34	28	18	26	EL	237	30
Vered Buskila; Gil Cohen	470	3	~~21~~; ~~DSQ~~	10	19	4	14	12	15	12	17	EL	105	15

Notes

- M = Medal race. Only the top 10 competitors participated in the final medal race.
- EL = Eliminated – did not advance into the medal race
- BFD = Black flag disqualification (under rule 30.3).
- DSQ = Disqualified after a protest
- OCS = On the course side of the starting line at the starting signal and failed to start, or broke rule 30.1

== Shooting ==
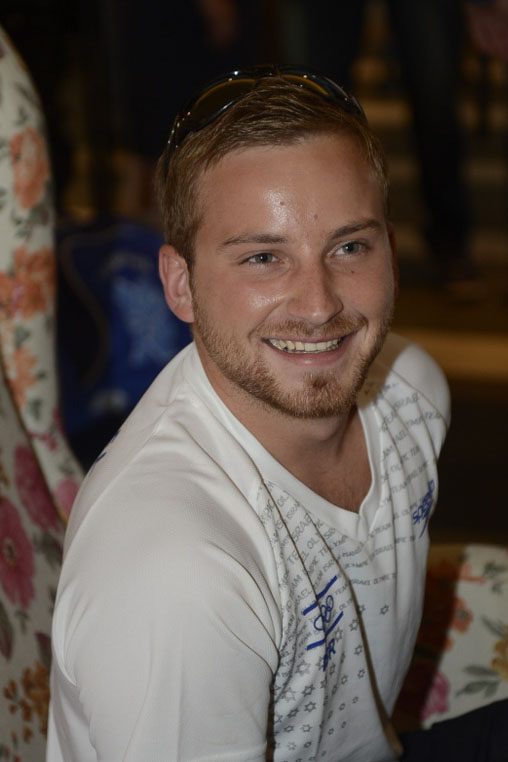
Sharpshooter Sergey Richter

Men

Athlete	Event	Qualification		Final	
Athlete	Event	Points	Rank	Points	Rank
Sergey Richter	10 m air rifle	595	9	Did not advance	
Sergey Richter	50 m rifle prone	587	44	Did not advance	

== Swimming ==
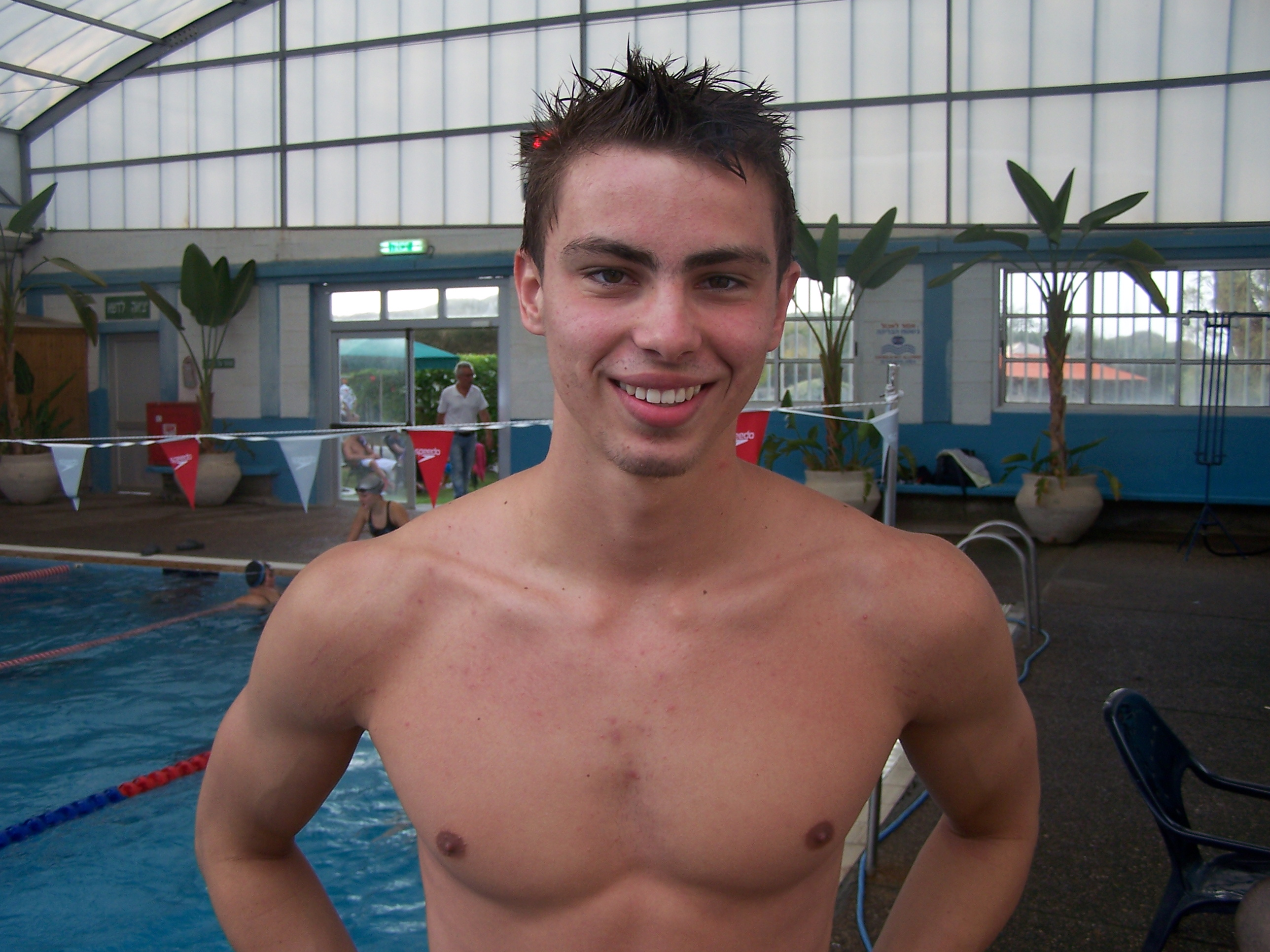
Swimmer Yakov Toumarkin

Men

Athlete	Event	Heat		Semifinal		Final	
Athlete	Event	Time	Rank	Time	Rank	Time	Rank
Nimrod Shapira Bar-Or	200 m freestyle	1:48.60	21	Did not advance			
Imri Ganiel	100 m breaststroke	1:02.07	32	Did not advance			
Gal Nevo	200 m butterfly	1:59.98	32	Did not advance			
Gal Nevo	200 m individual medley	1:59.56	12 Q	1:59.17	10	Did not advance	
Gal Nevo	400 m individual medley	4:14.77	10	—N/a		Did not advance	
Yakov-Yan Toumarkin	100 m backstroke	54.91	24	Did not advance			
Yakov-Yan Toumarkin	200 m backstroke	1:57.33 NR	8 Q	1:57.33 =NR	8 Q	1:57.62	7

Women

Athlete	Event	Heat		Semifinal		Final	
Athlete	Event	Time	Rank	Time	Rank	Time	Rank
Amit Ivry	100 m butterfly	58.78	18	Did not advance			
Amit Ivry	200 m individual medley	2:13.29 NR	12 Q	2:13.31	13	Did not advance	

== Synchronized swimming ==
Athlete	Event	Technical routine		Free routine (preliminary)			Free routine (final)		
Athlete	Event	Points	Rank	Points	Total (technical + free)	Rank	Points	Total (technical + free)	Rank
Anastasia Gloushkov; Inna Yoffe	Duet	83.400	17	83.520	166.920	17	did not advance		

== Tennis ==
Athlete	Event	Round of 64	Round of 32	Round of 16	Quarterfinals	Semifinals	Final / BM	
Athlete	Event	Opposition Score	Opposition Score	Opposition Score	Opposition Score	Opposition Score	Opposition Score	Rank
Jonathan Erlich; Andy Ram	Men's doubles	—N/a	Granollers / M. López (ESP); W 7–6^{(7–5)}, 7–6^{(7–3)}	Federer / Wawrinka (SUI); W 1–6, 7–6^{(7–5)}, 6–3	M. Bryan / B. Bryan (USA); L 7–6^{(7–4)}, 7–6^{(12–10)}	Did not advance		
Shahar Pe'er	Women's singles	Sharapova (RUS); L 2–6, 0–6	Did not advance					

== See also ==
- Israel at the 2012 Summer Paralympics
