= Greece at the 2012 Summer Olympics =

- IOC code: GRE
- NOC: Hellenic Olympic Committee
- Website: www.hoc.gr (in Greek and English)

in London
- Competitors: 103 in 19 sports
- Flag bearers: Alexandros Nikolaidis (opening); Spyridon Gianniotis (closing)
- Medals Ranked 75th: Gold 0 Silver 0 Bronze 2 Total 2

Summer Olympics appearances (overview)
- 1896; 1900; 1904; 1908; 1912; 1920; 1924; 1928; 1932; 1936; 1948; 1952; 1956; 1960; 1964; 1968; 1972; 1976; 1980; 1984; 1988; 1992; 1996; 2000; 2004; 2008; 2012; 2016; 2020; 2024; 2028

Other related appearances
- 1906 Intercalated Games

Greece competed at the 2012 Summer Olympics in London, United Kingdom, from 27 July to 12 August 2012. The Hellenic Olympic Committee sent a total of 103 athletes to the Games in London, 65 men and 38 women, to compete in 19 sports. Men's water polo was the only team event in which Greece was represented at these Olympic Games.

As the progenitor nation of the Olympic games and in keeping with tradition, Greece entered first during the opening ceremony, led by taekwondo jin Alexandros Nikolaidis, two-time Olympic silver medalist in men's super heavyweight division.

Greece failed to win a gold or a silver medal for the first time since 1988 Summer Olympics in Seoul. Only two bronze medals were awarded to the team: one in judo, by Ilias Iliadis, an Olympic gold medalist at the 2004 Summer Olympics in Athens, and the other in rowing, by Alexandra Tsiavou (sixth in Beijing), and Christina Giazitzidou.

Several athletes missed out of the medal standings in the finals, including swimmer Spyridon Gianniotis (fourth in the open water marathon), the Men's coxless four team (finished in the fourth place), Vassiliki Vougiouka (missed out the semi-finals in fencing), sailor Byron Kokkalanis, (sixth in men's windsurfing) and gymnast Vasileios Tsolakidis (sixth in men's parallel bars).

== Medalists ==
Medal	Name	Sport	Event	Date
Bronze	Ilias Iliadis	Judo	Men's 90 kg	1 August
Bronze	Christina Giazitzidou; Alexandra Tsiavou	Rowing	Women's lightweight double sculls	4 August

Medals by sport
Sport	1st place, gold medalist(s)	2nd place, silver medalist(s)	3rd place, bronze medalist(s)	Total
Judo	0	0	1	1
Rowing	0	0	1	1
Total	0	0	2	2

== Competitors ==
The following is the list of number of competitors participating in the Games and selected biographies.

Sport	Men	Women	Total
Archery	0	1	1
Athletics	11	12	23
Canoeing	1	0	1
Cycling	4	0	4
Diving	1	0	1
Fencing	0	1	1
Gymnastics	2	7	9
Judo	1	1	2
Rowing	8	2	10
Sailing	9	2	11
Shooting	2	1	3
Swimming	8	6	14
Synchronized swimming	0	2	2
Table tennis	2	0	2
Taekwondo	1	0	1
Volleyball	0	2	2
Water polo	13	0	13
Weightlifting	1	0	1
Wrestling	1	1	2
Total	65	38	103

== Archery ==
Greece qualified one archer.

Athlete	Event	Ranking round		Round of 64	Round of 32	Round of 16	Quarterfinals	Semifinals	Final / BM	
Athlete	Event	Score	Seed	Opposition Score	Opposition Score	Opposition Score	Opposition Score	Opposition Score	Opposition Score	Rank
Evangelia Psarra	Women's individual	636	43	Devi (IND) (22); L 4–6	did not advance					

== Athletics ==
Greek athletes achieved qualifying standards in the following athletics events (up to a maximum of 3 athletes in each event at the 'A' Standard, and 1 at the 'B' Standard):

Key

- Note–Ranks given for track events are within the athlete's heat only
- Q = Qualified for the next round
- q = Qualified for the next round as a fastest loser or, in field events, by position without achieving the qualifying target
- NR = National record
- N/A = Round not applicable for the event
- Bye = Athlete not required to compete in round

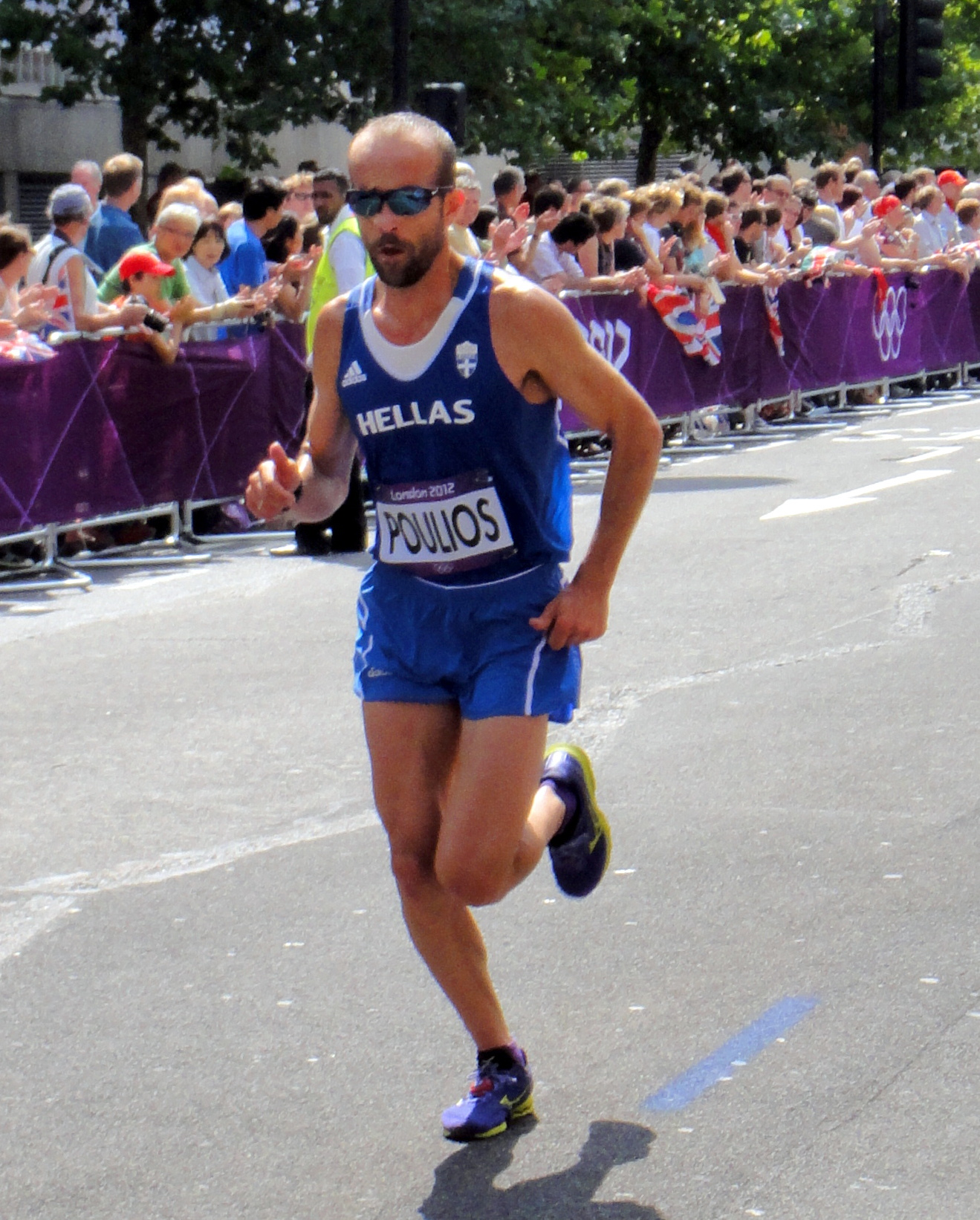
Konstantinos Poulios finished eightieth in men's marathon.

Men
Track & road events

Athlete	Event	Heat		Semifinal		Final	
Athlete	Event	Result	Rank	Result	Rank	Result	Rank
Konstadinos Douvalidis	110 m hurdles	13.40	2 Q	13.77	7	Did not advance	
Periklis Iakovakis	400 m hurdles	50.27	5	Did not advance			
Alexandros Papamichail	20 km walk	—N/a				1:21:12 NR	15
Alexandros Papamichail	50 km walk	—N/a				3:49:56 NR	25
Konstantinos Poulios	Marathon	—N/a				2:33:17	80
Lykourgos-Stefanos Tsakonas	200 m	20.56	4 q	20.52=PB	5	Did not advance	

Field events

Athlete	Event	Qualification		Final	
Athlete	Event	Distance	Position	Distance	Position
Konstadinos Baniotis	High jump	2.21	25	Did not advance	
Konstadinos Filippidis	Pole vault	5.60	3 q	5.65	6
Spyridon Lebesis	Javelin throw	82.40	5 Q	81.91	7
Alexandros Papadimitriou	Hammer throw	67.19	37	Did not advance	
Michalis Stamatogiannis	Shot put	19.24	25	Did not advance	
Louis Tsatoumas	Long jump	7.53	29	Did not advance	

Women
Track & road events

Athlete	Event	Heat		Quarterfinal		Semifinal		Final	
Athlete	Event	Result	Rank	Result	Rank	Result	Rank	Result	Rank
María Belibasáki	100 m	Bye		11.63	6	Did not advance			
María Belibasáki	200 m	23.36	4	—N/a		Did not advance			
Eléni Filándra	800 m	2:02.29	3 Q	—N/a		2:04.42	8	Did not advance	
Konstadina Kefala	Marathon	—N/a						3:01.18	104
Déspina Zapounídou	20 km walk	—N/a						1.35.19	44

Field events

Athlete	Event	Qualification		Final	
Athlete	Event	Distance	Position	Distance	Position
Nikoleta Kyriakopoulou	Pole vault	4.25	19	Did not advance	
Stélla-Iró Ledáki	Pole vault	4.50 =PB	13	Did not advance	
Savva Lika	Javelin throw	57.06	27	Did not advance	
Niki Paneta	Triple jump	13.66	24	Did not advance	
Athanasia Perra	Triple jump	11.93	33	Did not advance	
Katerina Stefanidi	Pole vault	4.25	24	Did not advance	
Antonia Stergiou	High jump	1.93 SB	13	Did not advance	

Combined events – Heptathlon

Athlete	Event	100H	HJ	SP	200 m	LJ	JT	800 m	Final	Rank
Sofia Ifantidou	Result	13.82	1.68	12.96	25.91	5.81	56.96 OR	2:22.03	5947	24
Sofia Ifantidou	Points	1004	830	725	805	792	995	796	5947	24

== Canoeing ==
=== Slalom ===
Greece has qualified boats for the following events

Athlete	Event	Preliminary						Semifinal		Final	
Athlete	Event	Run 1	Rank	Run 2	Rank	Best	Rank	Time	Rank	Time	Rank
Christos Tsakmakis	Men's C-1	165.79	17	105.22	13	105.22	15	Did not advance			

== Cycling ==
=== Road ===
Athlete	Event	Time	Rank
Ioannis Tamouridis	Men's road race	5:58:24	110

=== Track ===
Sprint

Athlete	Event	Qualification		Round 1	Repechage 1	Round 2	Repechage 2	Quarterfinals	Semifinals	Final	
Athlete	Event	Time Speed (km/h)	Rank	Opposition Time Speed (km/h)	Opposition Time Speed (km/h)	Opposition Time Speed (km/h)	Opposition Time Speed (km/h)	Opposition Time Speed (km/h)	Opposition Time Speed (km/h)	Opposition Time Speed (km/h)	Rank
Zafeiris Volikakis	Men's sprint	10.663; 67.523	17	Baugé (FRA); DSQ	Did not advance						

Keirin

Athlete	Event	1st Round	Repechage	2nd Round	Final
Athlete	Event	Rank	Rank	Rank	Rank
Christos Volikakis	Men's keirin	6 R	1 Q	6	9

=== Mountain biking ===
Athlete	Event	Time	Rank
Periklis Ilias	Men's cross-country	1:38:51	33

== Diving ==
Athlete	Event	Preliminaries		Semifinals		Final	
Athlete	Event	Points	Rank	Points	Rank	Points	Rank
Stefanos Paparounas	Men's 3 m springboard	366.10	26	Did not advance			

== Fencing ==
Greece qualified 1 fencer.

Athlete	Event	Round of 32	Round of 16	Quarterfinal	Semifinal	Final	
Athlete	Event	Opposition Score	Opposition Score	Opposition Score	Opposition Score	Opposition Score	Rank
Vassiliki Vougiouka	Women's sabre	Bond-Williams (GBR); W 15–8	Socha (POL); W 15–7	Kim J-y (KOR); L 12–15	Did not advance		

== Gymnastics ==
=== Artistic ===
Greece qualified three athletes.

Men

Athlete	Event	Qualification								Final							
Athlete	Event	Apparatus						Total	Rank	Apparatus						Total	Rank
Athlete	Event	F	PH	R	V	PB	HB	Total	Rank	F	PH	R	V	PB	HB	Total	Rank
Vlasios Maras	Parallel bars	—N/a				13.400	—N/a	13.400	64	Did not advance							
Vlasios Maras	Horizontal bar	—N/a					14.300	14.300	35	Did not advance							
Vasileios Tsolakidis	Parallel bars	—N/a				15.466	—N/a	15.466	7 Q	—N/a				15.300	—N/a	15.300	6

Women

Athlete	Event	Qualification						Final					
Athlete	Event	Apparatus				Total	Rank	Apparatus				Total	Rank
Athlete	Event	F	V	UB	BB	Total	Rank	F	V	UB	BB	Total	Rank
Vasiliki Millousi	All-around	12.933	12.800	13.425	14.366	53.524	34	Did not advance					

=== Rhythmic ===
Athlete	Event	Qualification				Final			
Athlete	Event	5 balls	3 ribbons 2 hoops	Total	Rank	5 balls	3 ribbons 2 hoops	Total	Rank
Eleni Doika; Alexia Kyriazi; Evdokia Loukagkou; Stavroula Samara; Vasileia Zachou; Marianthi Zafeiriou	Team	25.875	26.000	51.875	9	Did not advance			

== Judo ==
Greece qualified 2 judokas.

Athlete	Event	Round of 32	Round of 16	Quarterfinals	Semifinals	Repechage	Final / BM	
Athlete	Event	Opposition Result	Opposition Result	Opposition Result	Opposition Result	Opposition Result	Opposition Result	Rank
Ilias Iliadis	Men's −90 kg	Randl (SVK); W 0111–0002	Bauža (LTU); W 0100–0003	Denisov (RUS); L 0000–0020	Did not advance	Anthony (AUS); W 1000–0000	Camilo (BRA); W 0011–0002	3rd place, bronze medalist(s)
Ioulieta Boukouvala	Women's −57 kg	Lupetey (CUB); L 0001–0011	Did not advance					

== Rowing ==
Greece qualified the following boats.

Men

Athlete	Event	Heats		Repechage		Semifinals		Final	
Athlete	Event	Time	Rank	Time	Rank	Time	Rank	Time	Rank
Apostolos Gkountoulas; Nikolaos Gkountoulas	Pair	6:21.46	3 SA/B	Bye		7:07.15	5 FB	6:53.69	9
Eleftherios Konsolas; Panagiotis Magdanis	Lightweight double sculls	6:42.13	5 R	6:31.13	1 SA/B	6:40.89	4 FB	6:31.71	8
Ioannis Christou; Stergios Papachristos; Ioannis Tsilis; Georgios Tziallas	Four	5:57.71	3 SA/B	Bye		6:02.61	2 FA	6:11.43	4

Women

Athlete	Event	Heats		Repechage		Semifinals		Final	
Athlete	Event	Time	Rank	Time	Rank	Time	Rank	Time	Rank
Christina Giazitzidou; Alexandra Tsiavou	Lightweight double sculls	7:03.66	1 SA/B	Bye		7:09.01	2 FA	7:12.09	3rd place, bronze medalist(s)

Qualification Legend: FA=Final A (medal); FB=Final B (non-medal); FC=Final C (non-medal); FD=Final D (non-medal); FE=Final E (non-medal); FF=Final F (non-medal); SA/B=Semifinals A/B; SC/D=Semifinals C/D; SE/F=Semifinals E/F; QF=Quarterfinals; R=Repechage

== Sailing ==
Greece qualified 1 boat for each of the following events

Men

Athlete	Event	Race											Net points	Final rank
Athlete	Event	1	2	3	4	5	6	7	8	9	10	M*	Net points	Final rank
Byron Kokkalanis	RS:X	4	11	6	2	~~16~~	15	3	11	4	9	12	77	6
Evangelos Cheimonas	Laser	13	19	21	41	~~50~~; ~~DSQ~~	33	15	30	15	19	EL	206	26
Ioannis Mitakis	Finn	4	21	10	8	~~25~~; ~~OCS~~	10	20	19	7	9	EL	108	14
Panagiotis Kampouridis; Efstathios Papadopoulos	470	14	7	20	15	18	~~28~~; ~~DSQ~~	27	19	8	20	EL	148	19
Aimilios Papathanasiou; Antonis Tsotras	Star	3	16	7	12	7	15	~~17~~; ~~BFD~~	17; DSQ	17; OCS	12	EL	106	14

Women

Athlete	Event	Race											Net points	Final rank
Athlete	Event	1	2	3	4	5	6	7	8	9	10	M*	Net points	Final rank
Angeliki Skarlatou	RS:X	14	12	21	11	19	16	19	~~27~~; ~~OCS~~	15	7	EL	134	16
Anna Agrafioti	Laser Radial	28	29	30	32	~~34~~	34	15	34	23	32	EL	257	33

Open

Athlete	Event	Race																Net points	Final rank
Athlete	Event	1	2	3	4	5	6	7	8	9	10	11	12	13	14	15	M*	Net points	Final rank
Dionisios Dimou; Michail Pateniotis	49er	18	~~20~~	19	16	19	20	19	17	20	19	18	16	16	20	5	EL	242	20

M = Medal race; EL = Eliminated – did not advance into the medal race

== Shooting ==
Greece qualified for three quota places in shooting;

Athlete	Event	Qualification		Final	
Athlete	Event	Points	Rank	Points	Rank
Nikolaos Mavrommatis	Men's skeet	119	9	Did not advance	
Efthimios Mitas	Men's skeet	114	25	Did not advance	
Athina Douka	Women's 10 m air pistol	369	42	Did not advance	

== Swimming ==
Greek swimmers achieved qualifying standards in the following events (up to a maximum of 2 swimmers in each event at the Olympic Qualifying Time (OQT), and potentially 1 at the Olympic Selection Time (OST)):

Men

Athlete	Event	Heat		Semifinal		Final	
Athlete	Event	Time	Rank	Time	Rank	Time	Rank
Stefanos Dimitriadis	100 m butterfly	54.20	40	Did not advance			
Stefanos Dimitriadis	200 m butterfly	1:58.79	23	Did not advance			
Ioannis Drymonakos	200 m butterfly	1:56.97	16 Q	1:58.05	15	Did not advance	
Ioannis Drymonakos	400 m individual medley	4:17.04	17	—N/a		Did not advance	
Kristian Golomeev	100 m freestyle	50.08	31	Did not advance			
Spyridon Gianniotis	10 km open water	—N/a				1:50:05.3	4
Aristeidis Grigoriadis	100 m backstroke	54.52	17 Q	54.20	14	Did not advance	
Ioannis Kalargaris	50 m freestyle	22.80	30	Did not advance			
Panagiotis Samilidis	100 m breaststroke	1:01.20	22	Did not advance			
Panagiotis Samilidis	200 m breaststroke	2:14.82	27	Did not advance			
Andreas Vazaios	200 m individual medley	2:01.23	26	Did not advance			

Women

Athlete	Event	Heat		Semifinal		Final	
Athlete	Event	Time	Rank	Time	Rank	Time	Rank
Theodora Drakou	50 m freestyle	25.13	13 Q	25.28	16	Did not advance	
Marianna Lymperta	10 km open water	—N/a				2:04:26.5	22
Nery Mantey Niangkouara	50 m freestyle	25.40	21	Did not advance			
Nery Mantey Niangkouara	100 m freestyle	56.63	32	Did not advance			
Kristel Vourna	100 m butterfly	58.74	16 Q	58.31 NR	12	Did not advance	
Theodora Drakou; Theodora Giareni; Martha Matsa; Nery Mantey Niangkouara; Kristel Vourna	4 × 100 m freestyle relay	3:45.55	16	—N/a		Did not advance	

== Synchronized swimming ==
Greece qualified 2 quota places in synchronized swimming.

Athlete	Event	Technical routine		Free routine (preliminary)			Free routine (final)		
Athlete	Event	Points	Rank	Points	Total (technical + free)	Rank	Points	Total (technical + free)	Rank
Evangelia Platanioti; Despoina Solomou	Duet	89.200	8	88.840	178.040	8 Q	89.360	178.560	8

== Table tennis ==
Greece qualified two athletes for singles table tennis events. Based on their world rankings as of 16 May 2011 Kalinikos Kreanga and Panagiotis Gionis qualified for the men's event.

Athlete	Event	Preliminary round	Round 1	Round 2	Round 3	Round 4	Quarterfinals	Semifinals	Final / BM	
Athlete	Event	Opposition Result	Opposition Result	Opposition Result	Opposition Result	Opposition Result	Opposition Result	Opposition Result	Opposition Result	Rank
Panagiotis Gionis	Men's singles	Bye		Assar (EGY); W 4–0	Kishikawa (JPN); L 3–4	Did not advance				
Kalinikos Kreanga	Men's singles	Bye		Saive (BEL); W 4–1	Maze (DEN); L 1–4	Did not advance				

== Taekwondo ==
Alexandros Nikolaidis had ensured a quota place for Greece in the men's +80 kg by reaching the top 3 of the 2011 WTF World Qualification Tournament.

Athlete	Event	Round of 16	Quarterfinals	Semifinals	Repechage	Bronze medal	Final	
Athlete	Event	Opposition Result	Opposition Result	Opposition Result	Opposition Result	Opposition Result	Opposition Result	Rank
Alexandros Nikolaidis	Men's +80 kg	Tanrıkulu (TUR); L 3–7	Did not advance					

== Volleyball ==
=== Beach ===
Athlete	Event	Preliminary round	Standing	Round of 16	Quarterfinals	Semifinals	Final	
Athlete	Event	Opposition Score	Standing	Opposition Score	Opposition Score	Opposition Score	Opposition Score	Rank
Maria Tsiartsiani; Vassiliki Arvaniti	Women's	Pool B Kuhn – Zumkehr (SUI); L 0 – 2 (13–21, 19–21); Vasina – Vozakova (RUS); W 2 – 1 (18–21, 21–13, 15–12); Xue – Zhang (CHN); L 0 – 2 (17–21, 16–21)	4	Did not advance				19

== Water polo ==
Greece has qualified a men's team.

=== Men's tournament ===
Team roster

The following is the Greek roster in the men's water polo tournament of the 2012 Summer Olympics.

№	Name	Pos.	Height	Weight	Date of birth	2012 club
1	Nikolaos Deligiannis	GK	1.90 m (6 ft 3 in)	95 kg (209 lb)	3 September 1976	(Greece) Olympiacos
2	Emmanouil Mylonakis	D	1.85 m (6 ft 1 in)	75 kg (165 lb)	9 April 1985	(Greece) NO Vouliagmeni
3	Andreas Miralis	D	1.83 m (6 ft 0 in)	89 kg (196 lb)	21 September 1987	(Greece) NO Patras
4	Konstantinos Kokkinakis	CB	1.93 m (6 ft 4 in)	107 kg (236 lb)	9 October 1975	(Greece) Panathinaikos
5	Theodoros Chatzitheodorou	D	1.90 m (6 ft 3 in)	100 kg (220 lb)	1 October 1976	(Greece) NC Chios
6	Argyris Theodoropoulos	D	1.87 m (6 ft 2 in)	95 kg (209 lb)	13 January 1981	(Greece) NC Chios
7	Christos Afroudakis	D	1.88 m (6 ft 2 in)	88 kg (194 lb)	23 May 1984	(Greece) NO Vouliagmeni
8	Evangelos Delakas	CB	1.90 m (6 ft 3 in)	88 kg (194 lb)	8 February 1985	(Greece) Olympiacos
9	Georgios Afroudakis	CF	1.94 m (6 ft 4 in)	103 kg (227 lb)	17 October 1976	(Greece) Panathinaikos
10	Ioannis Fountoulis	D	1.87 m (6 ft 2 in)	86 kg (190 lb)	25 May 1988	(Greece) Olympiacos
11	Konstantinos Mourikis	CF	1.98 m (6 ft 6 in)	115 kg (254 lb)	11 July 1988	(Greece) Olympiacos
12	Manthos Voulgarakis	CF	1.88 m (6 ft 2 in)	104 kg (229 lb)	14 March 1980	(Greece) NO Vouliagmeni
13	Filippos Karampetsos	GK	1.92 m (6 ft 4 in)	95 kg (209 lb)	22 October 1974	(Greece) NC Chios

Head coach: Dragan Andrić

Group play

Team	Pld	W	D	L	GF	GA	GD	Pts	Qualification
Croatia	5	5	0	0	50	29	+21	10	Quarterfinals
Italy	5	3	1	1	40	36	+4	7	Quarterfinals
Spain	5	3	0	2	52	42	+10	6	Quarterfinals
Australia	5	2	0	3	40	44	−4	4	Quarterfinals
Greece	5	1	1	3	41	43	−2	3	
Kazakhstan	5	0	0	5	24	53	−29	0	

29 July 2012; 10:00	Report	Greece	6–8	Croatia	Water Polo Arena, London; Referees: Adrian Alexandrescu (ROU), György Juhász (HUN)
29 July 2012; 10:00	Report	Score by quarters: 2–1, 1–2, 2–2, 1–3			Water Polo Arena, London; Referees: Adrian Alexandrescu (ROU), György Juhász (HUN)
29 July 2012; 10:00	Report	Fountoulis, Mourikis 2	Goals	three players 2	Water Polo Arena, London; Referees: Adrian Alexandrescu (ROU), György Juhász (HUN)

31 July 2012; 15:30	Report	Greece	7–7	Italy	Water Polo Arena, London; Referees: Marijo Brguljan (MNE), Mihajlo Ćirić (SRB)
31 July 2012; 15:30	Report	Score by quarters: 2–1, 1–2, 2–3, 2–1			Water Polo Arena, London; Referees: Marijo Brguljan (MNE), Mihajlo Ćirić (SRB)
31 July 2012; 15:30	Report	Fountoulis, Afroudakis 2	Goals	Presciutti 2	Water Polo Arena, London; Referees: Marijo Brguljan (MNE), Mihajlo Ćirić (SRB)

2 August 2012; 11:20	Report	Kazakhstan	4–11	Greece	Water Polo Arena, London; Referees: Ulrich Spiegel (GER), Brian Littlejohn (GBR)
2 August 2012; 11:20	Report	Score by quarters: 1–2, 0–4, 1–3, 2–2			Water Polo Arena, London; Referees: Ulrich Spiegel (GER), Brian Littlejohn (GBR)
2 August 2012; 11:20	Report	Ukumanov 2	Goals	Fountoulis 5	Water Polo Arena, London; Referees: Ulrich Spiegel (GER), Brian Littlejohn (GBR)

4 August 2012; 14:10	Report	Greece	9–11	Spain	Water Polo Arena, London; Referees: Marijo Brguljan (MNE), Adrian Alexandrescu (ROU)
4 August 2012; 14:10	Report	Score by quarters: 3–4, 2–4, 2–1, 2–2			Water Polo Arena, London; Referees: Marijo Brguljan (MNE), Adrian Alexandrescu (ROU)
4 August 2012; 14:10	Report	Delakas 3	Goals	three players 3	Water Polo Arena, London; Referees: Marijo Brguljan (MNE), Adrian Alexandrescu (ROU)

6 August 2012; 11:20	Report	Greece	8–13	Australia	Water Polo Arena, London; Referees: Mihajlo Ćirić (SRB), Sergi Sanchez (ESP)
6 August 2012; 11:20	Report	Score by quarters: 2–3, 3–5, 1–3, 2–2			Water Polo Arena, London; Referees: Mihajlo Ćirić (SRB), Sergi Sanchez (ESP)
6 August 2012; 11:20	Report	Chatzitheodorou 3	Goals	Howden 3	Water Polo Arena, London; Referees: Mihajlo Ćirić (SRB), Sergi Sanchez (ESP)

== Weightlifting ==
Athlete	Event	Snatch		Clean & jerk		Total	Rank
Athlete	Event	Result	Rank	Result	Rank	Total	Rank
David Kavelasvili	Men's −94 kg	170	11	200	13	370	13

== Wrestling ==
Greece qualified in the following events.

Key:

- VT - Victory by Fall.
- PP - Decision by Points - the loser with technical points.
- PO - Decision by Points - the loser without technical points.

Men's freestyle

Athlete	Event	Qualification	Round of 16	Quarterfinal	Semifinal	Repechage 1	Repechage 2	Final / BM	
Athlete	Event	Opposition Result	Opposition Result	Opposition Result	Opposition Result	Opposition Result	Opposition Result	Opposition Result	Rank
Olegk Motsalin	−74 kg	Bye	Tigiev (UZB); L 0–3 ^{PO}	Did not advance					11

Women's freestyle

Athlete	Event	Qualification	Round of 16	Quarterfinal	Semifinal	Repechage 1	Repechage 2	Final / BM	
Athlete	Event	Opposition Result	Opposition Result	Opposition Result	Opposition Result	Opposition Result	Opposition Result	Opposition Result	Rank
Maria Prevolaraki	−55 kg	Bye	Ratkevich (AZE); L 0–3 ^{PO}	Did not advance					15
