= Eleni Doika =

Greek rhythmic gymnast (born 1995)

- Born: 15 November 1995 (age 30) Corfu, Greece
- Height: 168 cm (5 ft 6 in)

Gymnastics career
- Discipline: Rhythmic gymnastics
- Country represented: Greece (2011-2016)

Eleni Doika (born 15 November 1995) is a Greek former group rhythmic gymnast. She represented Greece at the 2012 and 2016 Summer Olympics. She also competed at the 2011, 2013, 2014 and 2015 World Rhythmic Gymnastics Championships.

== Gymnastics career ==
Doika began rhythmic gymnastics in 2001. She competed at her first World Championships in 2011 with the Greek national group and helped them place 11th in the all-around. As a result, they qualified for the 2012 Olympic Test Event. There, Doika and the Greek group tied with France for the bronze medal and earned a berth for the 2012 Summer Olympics.

Doika represented Greece at the 2012 Summer Olympics alongside Alexia Kyriazi, Evdokia Loukagkou, Stavroula Samara, Vasileia Zachou, and Marianthi Zafeiriou. The group finished ninth in the qualification round, missing out on the top eight final.

Doika competed with the Greek group that finished 11th in the all-around at the 2013 World Championships. She competed at the 2014 European Championships with the Greek group that finished 10th in the all-around. They then finished 12th at the 2014 World Championships. She represented Greece at the 2015 European Games and helped the group finish 12th.

Doika and the Greek group finished 14th in the all-around at the 2015 World Championships and qualified for the 2016 Olympic Test Event. There, Doika and the Greek group won the bronze medal behind Germany and Uzbekistan and qualified for the 2016 Summer Olympics. They then finished eighth in the all-around at the 2016 European Championships.

Doika competed at the 2016 Summer Olympics in Rio de Janeiro alongside Ioanna Anagnostopoulou, Zoi Kontogianni, Michaela Metallidou, and Stavroula Samara. The group finished 13th in qualification and did not advance to the final.

As of 2025, Doika is a rhythmic gymnastics coach.
