= 2011 World Rhythmic Gymnastics Championships =

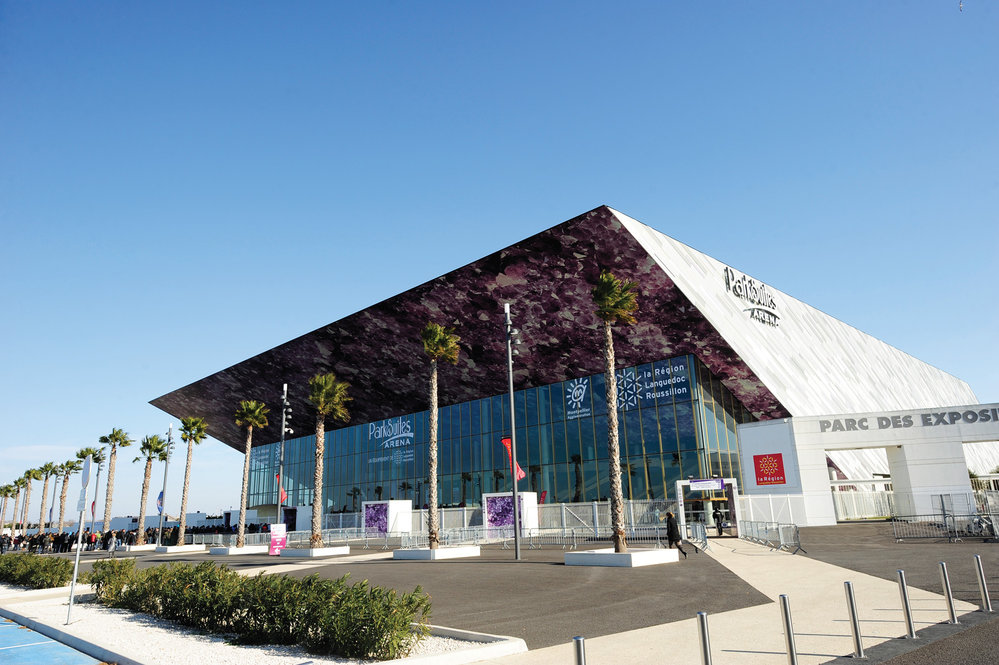
- Arena Montpellier, where the competition took place
- Venue: Arena Montpellier
- Location: Montpellier, France
- Start date: 19 September 2011
- End date: 25 September 2011

The 2011 World Rhythmic Gymnastics Championships was held in Montpellier, France, from September 19–25, 2011 at the Arena Montpellier. Only the top 24 groups from the 2010 World Rhythmic Gymnastics Championships were allowed to take part in the group competition this time. These championships were the first qualifying event for the 2012 Olympics which was held in London. In the group all-around competition, the top 6 teams qualified directly for the Group Competition at the 2012 Olympics, while teams placed 7th to 12th will get a second chance to qualify at the London test event in January 2012 for additional four spots. In Individual all-around, the top 15 gymnasts in the World Championships earned a place in the Olympic competition for their respective countries (subject to a maximum of two per country) with further 5 places to be decided at the test event (maximum one per country).

== Schedule ==
19.09.2011 Monday

- 10:00 - 13:30 Qualification (CI) - Individuals Group 1 & 2 (Hoop and Ball)
- 14:30 - 15:00 Opening ceremony
- 15:00 - 18:30 Qualification (CI) - Individuals Group 3 & 4 (Hoop and Ball)

20.09.2011 Tuesday

- 10:00 - 13:30 Qualification (CI) - Individuals Group 4 & 3 (Hoop and Ball)
- 15:00 - 18:30 Qualification (CI) - Individuals Group 2 & 1 (Hoop and Ball)
- 20:00 - 20:30 Individual Final (CIII) Hoop
- 20:30 - 21:00 Individual Final (CIII) Ball
- 21:00 - 21:15 Award ceremony Finals Hoop and Ball

21.09.2011 Wednesday

- 10:00 - 13:30 Qualification (CI) - Individuals Group 1 & 2 (Clubs and Ribbon)
- 15:00 - 18:30 Qualification (CI) - Individuals Group 3 & 4 (Clubs and Ribbon)

22.09.2011 Thursday

- 10:00 - 13:30 Qualification (CI) - Individuals Group 4 & 3 (Clubs and Ribbon)
- 15:00 - 18:30 Qualification (CI) - Individuals Group 2 & 1 (Clubs and Ribbon)
- 20:00 - 20:30 Individual Final (CIII) Clubs
- 20:30 - 21:00 Individual Final (CIII) Ribbon
- 21:00 - 21:15 Award ceremony Finals Clubs and Ribbon
- 21:15 - 21:25 Award ceremony Teams

23.09.2011 Friday

- 16:30 - 19:00 Individual All-Around Final (CII) Group B (rank 13-24)
- 20:00 - 22:30 Individual All-Around Final (CII) Group B (rank 1-12)
- 22:30 - 22:40 Longines Prize of Elegance
- 22:40 - 22:55 Award ceremony Individual All-Around

24.09.2011 Saturday

- 15:00 - 19:00 Group All-Around (CI)
- 19:00 - 19:15 Award ceremony Group All-Around

25.09.2011 Sunday

- 14:00 - 14:40 Group Final (CIII) 5 Balls
- 14:40 - 14:50 Award ceremony Group Final 5 Balls
- 15:00 - 15:40 Group Final (CIII) 3 Ribbons and 2 Hoops
- 15:40 - 15:50 Award ceremony Group Final 3 Ribbons and 2 Hoops
- 16:15 - 17:50 Gala and Closing ceremony

== Medal winners ==
Event	Gold	Silver	Bronze
Team Competition
All-Around	Russia Yevgeniya Kanayeva; Daria Kondakova; Daria Dmitrieva; Alexandra Merkulova	Belarus Liubov Charkashyna; Melitina Staniouta; Aliaksandra Narkevich; Hanna Rabtsava	Ukraine Alina Maksymenko; Ganna Rizatdinova; Viktoria Mazur; Victoriia Shynkarenko
Individual Finals
Hoop	Yevgeniya Kanayeva (RUS)	Daria Kondakova (RUS)	Neta Rivkin (ISR)
Ball	Yevgeniya Kanayeva (RUS)	Daria Kondakova (RUS)	Liubov Charkashyna (BLR)
Clubs	Yevgeniya Kanayeva (RUS)	Daria Kondakova (RUS)	Silviya Miteva (BUL)
Ribbon	Yevgeniya Kanayeva (RUS)	Daria Kondakova (RUS)	Silviya Miteva (BUL)
All-Around	Yevgeniya Kanayeva (RUS)	Daria Kondakova (RUS)	Aliya Garayeva (AZE)
Groups Finals
All-Around	Italy; Elisa Blanchi; Romina Laurito; Marta Pagnini; Elisa Santoni; Anzhelika Savrayuk; Andreea Stefanescu	Russia; Uliana Donskova; Ksenia Dudkina; Olga Ilina; Alina Makarenko; Anastasia Nazarenko; Natalia Pichuzhkina	Bulgaria; Reneta Kamberova; Mihaela Maevska; Tsvetelina Naydenova; Elena Todorova; Hristiana Todorova; Katrin Velkova
5 Balls	Russia; Uliana Donskova; Ksenia Dudkina; Olga Ilina*; Alina Makarenko; Anastasia Nazarenko; Natalia Pichuzhkina	Italy; Elisa Blanchi; Romina Laurito; Marta Pagnini; Elisa Santoni; Anzhelika Savrayuk; Andreea Stefanescu*	Bulgaria; Reneta Kamberova; Mihaela Maevska; Tsvetelina Naydenova; Elena Todorova; Hristiana Todorova; Katrin Velkova*
3 Ribbons + 2 Hoops	Bulgaria; Reneta Kamberova; Mihaela Maevska; Tsvetelina Naydenova*; Elena Todorova; Hristiana Todorova; Katrin Velkova	Italy; Elisa Blanchi; Romina Laurito; Marta Pagnini*; Elisa Santoni; Anzhelika Savrayuk; Andreea Stefanescu	Israel; Moran Buzovski; Viktoriya Koshel; Noa Palatchy; Marina Shults*; Polina Zakaluzny; Eliora Zholhovsky

* reserve gymnast

== Individual ==
=== Teams Competition and Individual Qualification ===
The competition was held from September 19 to September 22.

Nation/Gymnasts	Hoop (rhythmic gymnastics)	Ball (rhythmic gymnastics)	Clubs (rhythmic gymnastics)	Ribbon (rhythmic gymnastics)	Total
Russia (1)	87.350	83.525	85.625	87.075	290.275
Alexandra Merkulova			28.050		28.050 (127)
Daria Kondakova	29.250	29.000	28.375	29.150	87.400 (2)
Yevgeniya Kanayeva	29.300	29.275	29.200	29.150	87.775 (1)
Daria Dmitrieva	28.800	25.250		28.775	82.825 (8)
Belarus (2)	80.775	82.525	81.900	78.600	272.500
Aliaksandra Narkevich		26.775	26.550		53.325 (120)
Melitina Staniouta	27.375	27.800	27.450	25.550	82.625 (9)
Liubov Charkashyna	27.650	27.950	27.900	27.100	83.500 (4)
Hanna Rabtsava	25.750			25.950	51.700 (121)
Ukraine (3)	79.100	80.775	80.600	80.175	269.675
Alina Maksymenko	27.775	27.400	27.850	27.800	83.425 (5)
Ganna Rizatdinova	25.975	26.850	26.600	26.750	80.200 (15)
Viktoriia Shynkarenko			26.150		26.150 (128)
Viktoria Mazur	25.350	26.525		25.625	77.500 (23)
Azerbaijan (4)	79.125	79.175	78.550	77.650	264.825
Anna Gurbanova	25.500	25.625	25.500	24.525	76.625 (27)
Zeynab Javadli	25.450	25.600	25.400	25.150	76.450 (29)
Aliya Garayeva	28.175	27.950	27.650	27.975	84.100 (3)
Bulgaria (5)	77.300	76.125	78.300	75.375	260.275
Anastasiya Kisse	24.850	23.750	25.300	24.050	74.200 (42)
Tsvetelina Stoyanova	24.975	24.950	25.475	23.075	75.400 (32)
Silviya Miteva	27.475	27.425	27.525	28.250	83.250 (6)
Uzbekistan (6)	76.150	77.075	74.550	76.150	256.550
Zamirajon Sanokulova	24.050	24.500	23.325	24.050	72.600 (57)
Djamila Rakhmatova	24.700	25.375	25.300	24.650	75.375 (33)
Ulyana Trofimova	27.400	27.200	25.925	27.450	82.050 (10)
Italy (7)	76.400	75.875	76.375	76.350	256.300
Alessia Marchetto	24.900	24.200	24.550	24.500	73.950 (46)
Federica Febbo	25.425	25.325	25.625	25.450	76.500 (28)
Julieta Cantaluppi	26.075	26.350	26.200	26.400	78.950 (18)
South Korea (8)	75.975	75.525	76.250	74.700	255.000
Gim Yun-hee	24.700	24.525	24.350	24.800	74.025 (44)
Shin Soo-ji	24.550	24.450	24.700	23.100	73.700 (49)
Son Yeon-jae	26.725	26.550	27.200	26.800	80.725 (14)
Kazakhstan (9)	75.900	76.475	74.400	73.925	254.250
Anna Alyabyeva	26.800	27.125	26.450	27.075	81.000 (12)
Mizana Ismailova	25.100	24.850	24.600	23.750	74.550 (41)
Madina Mukanova	24.000	24.500	23.350	23.100	71.850 (64)
Poland (10)	75.975	73.625	76.675	74.100	253.925
Marta Jasinska	24.350	23.350	24.375	23.100	72.075 (62)
Anna Czarniecka	24.550	23.775	25.150	23.900	73.600 (50)
Joanna Mitrosz	27.075	26.500	27.150	27.100	81.325 (11)
Spain (11)	76.150	75.250	76.250	74.450	253.700
Julia Uson Carvajal	24.400	25.050	24.675	24.400	74.125 (43)
Natalia García Timofeeva	25.475	24.300	25.100	24.100	74.875 (36)
Carolina Rodriguez Ballesteros	26.275	25.900	26.475	25.950	78.700 (19)
Japan (12)	76.125	75.175	76.125	74.400	253.300
Runa Yamaguchi	25.500	25.750	25.350	25.700	76.950 (26)
Yuria Onuki	25.225	24.850	25.625	23.950	75.700 (31)
Hiromi Nakatsu	25.400	24.575	25.150	24.750	75.300 (34)
China (13)	74.800	75.700	76.150	72.700	252.950
Hou Yanan			24.700		24.700 (129)
Peng Linyi	24.900	25.050	24.850	22.400	74.800 (38)
Deng Senyue	25.550	26.350	26.600	26.300	79.250 (17)
Yang Yuqing	24.350	24.300		24.000	72.650 (56)
Austria (14)	74.250	74.575	74.050	71.750	249.325
Caroline Weber	26.450	26.550	26.250	26.450	79.450 (16)
Selina Poestinger	23.750	23.625	23.450	22.700	70.825 (74)
Nicol Ruprecht	24.050	24.400	24.350	22.600	72.800 (54)
Hungary (15)	74.075	72.375	71.750	68.775	245.075
Fanni Forray	23.700	22.550	23.250	23.600	70.550 (77)
Anna Szaloki	24.175	23.575	22.625	19.350	70.375 (79)
Dora Vass	26.200	26.250	25.875	25.825	78.325 (20)
United States (16)	73.625	74.725	71.675	70.850	244.675
Shelby Kisiel	24.250	24.725	24.475	22.850	73.450 (52)
Julie Zetlin	25.275	25.650	23.850	24.200	75.125 (35)
Polina Kozitsky	24.100	24.350	23.350	23.800	72.250 (59)
Mexico (17)	71.850	71.925	72.850	71.550	241.425
Rut Castillo Galindo	23.350	23.575	24.025	23.550	71.150 (71)
Veronica Navarro	23.400	23.625	24.000	23.700	71.325 (68)
Cynthia Valdez Perez	25.100	24.725	24.825	24.300	74.650 (40)
Estonia (18)	72.975	71.750	73.375	68.200	241.175
Olga Bogdanova	23.800	23.475	24.000	22.375	71.275 (69)
Viktoria Bogdanova	24.625	24.625	24.475	22.750	73.725 (48)
Mari Liis Siimon	24.550	23.650	24.900	23.075	73.100 (53)
Turkey (19)	71.825	71.050	72.225	69.700	238.850
Asya Nur Taş	23.075	23.025	23.450	23.625	70.150 (81)
Burcin Neziroglu	24.150	23.300	24.625	22.925	72.075 (63)
Gozde Ozkebapci	24.600	24.725	24.150	23.150	73.475 (51)
Canada (20)	71.075	70.675	72.000	66.450	237.250
Mariam Chamilova	23.925	23.375	23.950	23.500	71.375 (67)
Maria Kitkarska	23.150	23.400	23.825	21.450	70.375 (80)
Nerissa Mo	24.000	23.900	24.225	21.500	72.125 (60)
Egypt (21)	71.700	70.025	69.475	66.500	234.950
Alia Yassin Elkatib	23.450	23.375	22.975	21.100	69.800 (82)
Mariz Farid Shawki	24.200	22.950	23.500	21.650	70.650 (76)
Yasmin Mohamed Rostom	24.050	23.700	23.000	23.750	71.500 (66)
Finland (22)	70.500	68.375	69.550	69.125	234.825
Inessa Rif	22.725	21.300	22.900	21.425	67.050 (102)
Jouki Tikkanen	24.075	24.275	23.950	24.400	72.750 (55)
Silja Ahonen	23.700	22.800	22.700	23.300	69.800 (84)
Australia (23)	68.850	68.825	68.400	69.775	231.325
Taylor Tirahardjo		22.250	22.800		45.050 (123)
Janine Murray	23.475	23.050	22.800	24.200	70.725 (75)
Danielle Prince	22.775	23.525	22.800	23.300	69.625 (86)
Jaelle Cohen	22.600			22.275	44.875 (124)
Czech Republic (24)	69.850	67.900	68.625	66.725	231.000
Tereza Wagnerová	21.350	21.550	22.300	20.900	65.200 (108)
Nataly Hamříková	23.500	23.400	21.200	22.125	69.025 (87)
Monika Míčková	25.000	22.950	25.125	23.700	73.825 (47)
Brazil (25)	70.775	65.725	66.900	67.475	229.150
Natalia Azevedo Gaudio	23.775	20.850	20.875	22.350	67.000 (103)
Angélica Kvieczynski	24.750	23.425	23.925	22.275	72.100 (61)
Simone Luiz	22.250	21.450	22.100	22.850	67.200 (101)
Slovakia (26)	70.150	66.375	68.025	65.400	227.675
Jana Duchnovska	23.400	22.525	21.600		67.525 (99)
Ivana Dermekova	22.650	20.825	22.625	21.450	66.725 (105)
Natalia Okaliova	24.100	23.025	23.800	22.400	70.925 (103)
Marianna Podlucka				21.550	21.550 (130)
United Kingdom (27)	68.275	66.100	67.200	65.750	226.150
Mimi-Isabella Cesar	21.575	21.350	20.475	20.700	63.625 (112)
Keziah Gore	22.900	22.100	22.900	21.500	67.900 (96)
Francesca Jones	23.800	22.650	23.825	23.550	71.175 (70)
Sweden (28)	68.850	65.950	67.975	63.400	224.375
Anastassia Johansson	23.150	22.025	22.550	21.150	67.725 (98)
Mikaela Lindholm	22.900	21.275	22.400	21.600	66.900 (104)
Jennifer Pettersson	22.800	22.650	23.025	20.650	68.475 (91)
South Africa (29)	66.900	65.750	46.375	66.350	223.775
Grace Legote	22.250	21.800	23.225	21.900	67.375 (100)
Aimee Van Rooyen	22.200	22.250	23.150	22.850	68.250 (94)
Julene Van Rooyen	22.450	21.700	0.000	21.600	65.750 (107)
Lithuania (30)	67.875	63.700	66.425	60.550	220.200
Brigita Kreivytė		21.050	21.450		42.50 (125)
Neda Šerniutė	23.325	22.700	22.825	21.200	68.850 (88)
Modesta Kudzmanaitė	23.100	19.950	22.150	20.950	66.200 (106)
Ugne Markevičiūtė	21.450			18.400	39.850 (126)
Colombia (31)	60.300	56.850	59.675	55.750	197.975
Wendy J. Cifuentes Trujillo	19.400	19.100	18.900	18.600	57.400 (118)
Tania Torres Raymond	18.600	17.500	18.875	17.100	54.975 (119)
Carolina Velez Ramirez	22.300	20.250	21.900	20.050	64.450 (109)
Other	---	---	---	---	---
Delphine Ledoux (FRA)	26.250	27.100	26.775	26.900	80.775 (13)
Alexandra Piscupescu (ROU)	24.900	26.050	25.850	26.300	78.200 (21)
Chrystalleni Trikomiti (CYP)	25.950	25.900	25.450	26.125	77.975 (22)
Varvara Filiou (GRE)	25.800	25.900	25.350	25.800	77.500 (24)
Laura Jung (GER)	25.850	21.775	25.700	25.625	77.175 (25)
Tjaša Šeme (SLO)	24.475	25.050	25.175	24.650	74.875 (37)
Artemi Gavezou Castro (GRE)	24.725	24.700	24.550	24.150	73.975 (45)
Tharatip Sridee (THA)	24.050	23.525	24.200	24.150	72.400 (58)
Jana Gamalejeva (LAT)	24.750	23.525	23.300	23.525	71.800 (65)
Elisabeth de Leeuw (BEL)	23.800	23.200	23.950	23.200	70.950 (72)
Lilit Harutyunyan (ARM)	22.975	23.575	23.900	22.600	70.450 (78)
Darya Shara (ARG)	23.350	23.025	23.150	23.300	69.800 (83)
Ana Carrasco Pini (ARG)	23.300	22.275	23.300	23.150	69.750 (85)
Milena Milacic (MNE)	22.850	21.550	22.425	23.350	68.625 (89)
Mirjana Sekovanic (CRO)	23.150	21.775	23.600	20.600	68.525 (90)
Tijana Krsmanovic (SRB)	22.850	20.375	22.925	22.650	68.425 (92)
Natalija Janusa (LAT)	22.925	22.100	23.275	21.250	68.300 (93)
Anyavarin Supateeralert (THA)	22.750	22.350	22.750	22.550	68.050 (95)
Andreina Acevedo Martinez (VEN)	23.150	21.650	22.450	22.200	67.800 (97)
Linda E. Sandoval Maldonado (GUA)	21.250	21.050	22.525	22.025	65.800 (107)
Nicole Bierbach (NAM)	21.750	21.550	20.550	20.950	64.250 (111)
Katherine Arias (VEN)	21.350	20.125	21.450	20.450	63.250 (113)
Valeska L. Gonzalez Olivares (CHI)	21.200	20.850	20.950	20.300	63.000 (114)
Matea Stojakovic (CRO)	20.450	20.350	20.450	20.650	61.550 (115)
Cristina F. Bello Contreras (CHI)	20.500	19.625	19.700	18.575	59.825 (116)
Fiona Pallares Quinn (AND)	19.050	18.050	20.125	18.475	57.650 (117)

=== Hoop ===
The final was held on Tuesday, 20 September at 20:00 local time.

Place	Name	Dif.	Art.	Exe.	Pen.	Total
1st place, gold medalist(s)	Yevgeniya Kanayeva (RUS)	9.900	9.800	9.600		29.300
2nd place, silver medalist(s)	Daria Kondakova (RUS)	9.650	9.800	9.600		29.050
3rd place, bronze medalist(s)	Neta Rivkin (ISR)	9.400	9.400	9.200		28.000
4	Silviya Miteva (BUL)	9.200	9.400	9.350		27.950
5	Alina Maksymenko (UKR)	9.250	9.350	9.200		27.800
6	Liubov Charkashyna (BLR)	9.375	9.300	9.000		27.675
7	Aliya Garayeva (AZE)	9.100	9.375	9.150		27.625
8	Ulyana Trofimova (UZB)	9.200	9.050	8.775	0.05	26.975

=== Ball ===
The final was held on Tuesday, 20 September at 20:30 local time.

Place	Name	Dif.	Art.	Exe.	Pen.	Total
1st place, gold medalist(s)	Yevgeniya Kanayeva (RUS)	9.950	9.900	9.750		29.600
2nd place, silver medalist(s)	Daria Kondakova (RUS)	9.875	9.900	9.550		29.325
3rd place, bronze medalist(s)	Liubov Charkashyna (BLR)	9.500	9.500	9.450		28.450
4	Silviya Miteva (BUL)	9.450	9.450	9.400		28.300
5	Alina Maksymenko (UKR)	9.325	9.400	9.250		27.975
6	Aliya Garayeva (AZE)	9.350	9.200	9.050		27.600
7	Neta Rivkin (ISR)	9.250	9.125	9.000		27.375
8	Melitina Staniouta (BLR)	9.100	9.200	9.050		27.350

=== Clubs ===
The final was held on Thursday, 22 September at 20:00 local time.

Place	Name	Dif.	Art.	Exe.	Pen.	Total
1st place, gold medalist(s)	Yevgeniya Kanayeva (RUS)	9.900	9.900	9.800		29.600
2nd place, silver medalist(s)	Daria Kondakova (RUS)	9.700	9.900	9.700		29.300
3rd place, bronze medalist(s)	Silviya Miteva (BUL)	9.400	9.500	9.400		28.300
4	Aliya Garayeva (AZE)	9.400	9.450	9.250		28.100
5	Neta Rivkin (ISR)	9.300	9.350	9.300		27.950
6	Alina Maksymenko (UKR)	9.225	9.400	9.250		27.875
7	Melitina Staniouta (BLR)	9.150	9.400	9.300		27.850
8	Liubov Charkashyna (BLR)	9.000	9.250	8.850		27.100

=== Ribbon ===
The final was held on Thursday, 22 September at 20:30 local time.

Place	Name	Dif.	Art.	Exe.	Pen.	Total
1st place, gold medalist(s)	Yevgeniya Kanayeva (RUS)	9.850	9.900	9.650		29.400
2nd place, silver medalist(s)	Daria Kondakova (RUS)	9.700	9.900	9.650		29.250
3rd place, bronze medalist(s)	Silviya Miteva (BUL)	9.450	9.500	9.350		28.300
4	Alina Maksymenko (UKR)	9.350	9.400	9.350		28.100
5	Aliya Garayeva (AZE)	9.250	9.375	9.350		27.975
6	Liubov Charkashyna (BLR)	9.100	9.300	9.200		27.600
7	Ulyana Trofimova (UZB)	8.900	9.100	8.900		26.900
8	Neta Rivkin (ISR)	8.600	9.100	8.800	0.05	26.450

=== All-around ===
The final was held on Friday, 23 September at 16:30 local time.
The top 15 gymnasts earned a quota place for their respective countries at the 2012 Olympics.

Place	Name	Hoop (rhythmic gymnastics)	Ball (rhythmic gymnastics)	Clubs (rhythmic gymnastics)	Ribbon (rhythmic gymnastics)	Total
1st place, gold medalist(s)	Yevgeniya Kanayeva (RUS)	29.200 (2)	28.550 (1)	29.400 (1)	29.500 (1)	116.650
2nd place, silver medalist(s)	Daria Kondakova (RUS)	29.450 (1)	28.500 (2)	29.350 (2)	29.300 (2)	116.600
3rd place, bronze medalist(s)	Aliya Garayeva (AZE)	28.175 (4)	27.700 (6)	28.125 (4)	28.450 (3)	112.450
4	Liubov Charkashyna (BLR)	27.900 (5)	28.200 (4)	28.000 (6)	28.100 (4)	112.200
5	Alina Maksymenko (UKR)	28.350 (3)	27.425 (9)	28.050 (5)	27.750 (6)	111.575
6	Melitina Staniouta (BLR)	26.950 (9)	27.725 (5)	27.925 (8)	27.650 (7)	110.250
7	Silviya Miteva (BUL)	25.600 (20)	28.325 (3)	28.350 (3)	27.950 (5)	110.225
8	Joanna Mitrosz (POL)	27.400 (7)	27.125 (11)	27.350 (9)	27.125 (11)	109.000
9	Ulyana Trofimova (UZB)	27.400 (7)	27.550 (7)	26.125 (15)	27.300 (10)	108.375
10	Neta Rivkin (ISR)	26.300 (16)	27.200 (10)	28.000 (6)	26.425 (15)	107.925
11	Son Yeon-jae (KOR)	26.625 (10)	27.075 (12)	27.150 (10)	26.900 (12)	107.750
12	Delphine Ledoux (FRA)	27.500 (6)	26.950 (13)	25.625 (22)	27.450 (8)	107.525
13	Deng Senyue (CHN)	26.475 (12)	26.700 (14)	26.175 (14)	26.550 (13)	105.900
14	Julieta Cantaluppi (ITA)	26.325 (15)	26.700 (14)	26.075 (17)	26.475 (14)	105.575
15	Caroline Weber (AUT)	26.550 (11)	26.350 (16)	26.475 (12)	26.125 (17)	105.500
16	Anna Alyabyeva (KAZ)	23.700 (24)	27.550 (7)	26.500 (11)	27.450 (8)	105.200
17	Alexandra Piscupescu (ROU)	26.350 (14)	26.350 (16)	26.000 (19)	26.250 (16)	104.950
18	Ganna Rizatdinova (UKR)	26.375 (13)	26.000 (18)	26.225 (13)	25.100 (24)	103.700
19	Laura Jung (GER)	26.125 (17)	25.575 (24)	26.050 (18)	25.775 (19)	103.525
20	Dora Vass (HUN)	25.750 (19)	25.900 (20)	25.750 (21)	25.725 (22)	103.125
21	Chrystalleni Trikomiti (CYP)	25.950 (18)	25.950 (19)	25.250 (24)	25.750 (20)	102.900
22	Runa Yamaguchi (JPN)	25.200 (21)	25.850 (22)	25.500 (23)	25.950 (18)	102.500
23	Varvara Filiou (GRE)	25.075 (22)	25.800 (20)	26.075 (17)	25.700 (23)	102.375
24	Carolina Rodriguez Ballesteros (ESP)	23.800 (23)	25.900 (20)	26.100 (16)	25.750 (20)	101.550

== Groups ==
=== Gymnasts ===
The following gymnasts took part in the group competition.

Nation	Name	Nation	Name	Nation	Name	Nation	Name
(Austria)	Barbara Sophie Lanzer	(China)	Bai Xiaoyue	(Hungary)	Julianna Buda	(Poland)	Monika Raszke
(Austria)	Sophia Lindtner	(China)	Chen Sheng	(Hungary)	Judith Hauser	(Poland)	Patrycja Romik
(Austria)	Claudia Linert	(China)	Shu Siyao	(Hungary)	Barbara Katona	(Poland)	Natalia Sobolewska
(Austria)	Lisa Nais	(China)	Yang Ye	(Hungary)	Fanni Kohlhoffer	(Poland)	Aleksandra Wojcik
(Austria)	Anna Ruprecht	(China)	Zhang Ling	(Hungary)	Anna Korom	(Poland)	Katarzyna Zuchlinska
(Austria)	Natascha Wegscheider	(China)	Zhao Jingnan	(Hungary)	Daria Topic	(Russia)	Uliana Donskova
(Azerbaijan)	Sabina Abbasova	(Spain)	Loreto Achaerandio	(Israel)	Moran Buzovski	(Russia)	Ksenia Dudkina
(Azerbaijan)	Jeyla Guliyeva	(Spain)	Sandra Aguilar	(Israel)	Viktoriya Koshel	(Russia)	Olga Ilina
(Azerbaijan)	Aelita Khalafova	(Spain)	Elena Lopez	(Israel)	Noa Palatchy	(Russia)	Alina Makarenko
(Azerbaijan)	Anastasiya Prasolova	(Spain)	Lourdes Mohedano	(Israel)	Marina Shults	(Russia)	Anastasia Nazarenko
(Azerbaijan)	Stefani Trayanova	(Spain)	Alejandra Quereda	(Israel)	Polina Zakaluzny	(Russia)	Natalia Pichuzhkina
(Azerbaijan)	Yevgeniya Zhidkova	(Spain)	Lidia Redondo	(Israel)	Eliora Zholkovsky	(Switzerland)	Capucine Jelmi
(Belarus)	Maryna Hancharova	(Finland)	Jenna Alavahtola	(Italy)	Elisa Blanchi	(Switzerland)	Stephanie Kälin
(Belarus)	Anastasiya Ivankova	(Finland)	Elisa Lehtonen	(Italy)	Romina Laurito	(Switzerland)	Nathanya Köhn
(Belarus)	Nataliya Leshchyk	(Finland)	Julia Maki	(Italy)	Marta Pagnini	(Switzerland)	Marine Périchon
(Belarus)	Yana Lukavets	(Finland)	Laura Mettinen	(Italy)	Elisa Santoni	(Switzerland)	Carol Rohatsch
(Belarus)	Kseniya Sankovich	(Finland)	Salla H. J. Vikkula	(Italy)	Anzhelika Savrayuk	(Switzerland)	Lisa Tacchelli
(Belarus)	Alina Tumilovich	(Finland)	Lotta Virtanen	(Italy)	Andreea Stefanescu	(Ukraine)	Olena Dmytrash
(Brazil)	Dayane Amaral	(France)	Samantha Ay	(Japan)	Yuka Endo	(Ukraine)	Yevgeniya Gomon
(Brazil)	Debora Andreazi Falda	(France)	Noémie Balthazard	(Japan)	Airi Hatakeyama	(Ukraine)	Valeriya Gudym
(Brazil)	Bianca Mendonça	(France)	Océanie Charoy	(Japan)	Rie Matsubara	(Ukraine)	Viktoriya Lenshyn
(Brazil)	Luisa Matsuo	(France)	Mélanie Haag	(Japan)	Rina Miura	(Ukraine)	Svitlana Prokopova
(Brazil)	Drielly Neves Daltoe	(France)	Jeanne Isenmann	(Japan)	Nina Saeed-Yokota	(Ukraine)	Anastasiya Shykharyeva
(Brazil)	Eliane Rosa Sampaio	(France)	Léa Peinoit	(Japan)	Kotono Tanaka	(United States)	Jessica Bogdanov
(Bulgaria)	Reneta Kamberova	(Germany)	Mira Bimperling	(Kazakhstan)	Valeriya Danilina	(United States)	Megan Frohlich
(Bulgaria)	Mihaela Maevska	(Germany)	Nicole Mueller	(Kazakhstan)	Viktoriya Fedonyuk	(United States)	Aimee Gupta
(Bulgaria)	Tsvetelina Naydenova	(Germany)	Camilla Pfeffer	(Kazakhstan)	Akbota Kalimzhanova	(United States)	Michelle Przybylo
(Bulgaria)	Elena Todorova	(Germany)	Cathrin Puhl	(Kazakhstan)	Yuliya Semenova	(United States)	Sofya Roytburg
(Bulgaria)	Hristiana Todorova	(Germany)	Sara Radman	(Kazakhstan)	Darya Shevchenko	(United States)	Sydney Sachs
(Bulgaria)	Katrin Velkova	(Germany)	Regina Sergeeva	(Kazakhstan)	Aliya Tleubayeva	(Uzbekistan)	Firuza Aminova
(Canada)	Katrina Cameron	(Greece)	Eleni Doika	(South Korea)	Choi Hyeon-hee	(Uzbekistan)	Luiza Ganieva
(Canada)	Rose Cossar	(Greece)	Alexia Kyriazi	(South Korea)	Kim Hye-jin	(Uzbekistan)	Olga Kiryakova
(Canada)	Alexandra Landry	(Greece)	Evdokia Loukagou	(South Korea)	Lee Kyung-un	(Uzbekistan)	Zarina Kurbonova
(Canada)	Anastasiya Muntyanu	(Greece)	Stavroula Samara	(South Korea)	Lee Da-ae	(Uzbekistan)	Ekaterina Safronova
(Canada)	Anjelika Reznik	(Greece)	Vasileia Zachou	(South Korea)	Seol Hee-moon	(Uzbekistan)	Yayra Serjanova
(Canada)	Kelsey Titmarsh	(Greece)	Marianthi Zafeiriou	(Poland)	Zuzanna Klajman		

=== All-around ===
The competition was held on Saturday, 24 September at 15:00 local time.
The top 6 teams qualified for the 2012 Olympics. The teams ranked 7th-12th qualified for the test event.

Place	Nation	5	3 + 2	Total
1st place, gold medalist(s)	Italy	27.350 (2)	27.800 (1)	55.150
2nd place, silver medalist(s)	Russia	27.250 (3)	27.600 (2)	54.850
3rd place, bronze medalist(s)	Bulgaria	26.800 (4)	27.325 (3)	54.125
4	Belarus	27.525 (1)	25.325 (12)	52.850
5	Japan	26.250 (6)	26.475 (6)	52.725
6	Germany	26.200 (7)	26.475 (5)	52.675
7	Ukraine	26.000 (9)	25.850 (9)	51.850
8	Switzerland	25.525 (11)	26.300 (7)	51.825
9	France	26.125 (8)	25.650 (10)	51.775
10	Israel	25.025 (14)	26.675 (4)	51.700
11	Greece	25.825 (10)	25.050 (15)	50.875
12	Spain	26.500 (5)	24.000 (17)	50.500
13	Azerbaijan	25.350 (12)	25.100 (13)	50.450
14	Hungary	25.050 (13)	25.100 (14)	50.150
15	Poland	24.450 (17)	25.500 (11)	49.950
16	China	23.900 (19)	25.950 (8)	49.850
17	Canada	24.775 (15)	24.175 (16)	48.950
18	Uzbekistan	24.225 (18)	23.575 (19)	47.800
19	Austria	23.825 (21)	23.775 (18)	47.600
20	United States	24.775 (15)	21.650 (24)	46.425
21	South Korea	23.850 (20)	22.550 (20)	46.400
22	Brazil	23.650 (22)	21.875 (23)	45.525
23	Finland	22.650 (23)	21.950 (22)	44.600
24	Kazakhstan	20.450 (24)	22.200 (21)	42.650

=== 5 Balls ===
The final will be held on Sunday, 25 September at 14:00 local time.

Place	Name	Dif.	Art.	Exe.	Pen.	Total
1st place, gold medalist(s)	Russia	9.250	9.600	9.150		28.000
2nd place, silver medalist(s)	Italy	8.750	9.350	8.900		27.000
3rd place, bronze medalist(s)	Bulgaria	8.800	9.350	8.800		26.950
4	Belarus	8.750	9.275	8.750		26.775
5	Japan	8.775	9.100	8.700		26.575
6	Spain	8.775	9.000	8.750		26.525
7	Germany	8.750	9.050	8.700		26.500
8	France	8.500	8.900	8.600		26.000

=== 3 Ribbons + 2 Hoops ===
The final will be held on Sunday, 25 September at 15:00 local time.

Place	Name	Dif.	Art.	Exe.	Pen.	Total
1st place, gold medalist(s)	Bulgaria	8.900	9.400	9.100		27.400
2nd place, silver medalist(s)	Italy	8.600	9.400	8.725		26.725
3rd place, bronze medalist(s)	Israel	8.750	9.200	8.725		26.675
4	Switzerland	8.500	8.800	8.550		25.850
5	Germany	8.450	8.800	8.325		25.575
6	Russia	8.450	8.900	7.850	0.20	25.000
7	Japan	8.400	8.550	7.950	0.40	24.500
8	China	8.075	8.100	7.500	0.05	23.625

== Medal table ==
Rank	Nation	Gold	Silver	Bronze	Total
1	Russia	7	6	0	13
2	Italy	1	2	0	3
3	Bulgaria	1	0	4	5
4	Belarus	0	1	1	2
5	Israel	0	0	2	2
6	Azerbaijan	0	0	1	1
6	Ukraine	0	0	1	1
Totals (7 entries)		9	9	9	27
