= Polina Zakaluzny =

Israeli rhythmic gymnast

- פולינה זקלוז'ני
- Born: February 21, 1992 (age 34)

Gymnastics career
- Discipline: Rhythmic gymnastics
- Country represented: Israel
Medal record
Representing Israel
Group Rhythmic Gymnastics
World Championships
| Bronze medal – third place | 2011 Montpellier | Hoop & Ribbon |

Polina Zakaluzny (Hebrew: פולינה זקלוז'ני; born February 21, 1992) is an Israeli rhythmic gymnast.

She and her Israeli teammates placed 5th in the 2009 World Rhythmic Gymnastics Championships in both Hoops and All-Around in Mie, Japan.

She won a bronze medal at the 2011 World Rhythmic Gymnastics Championships, Women's Groups 2 hoops + 3 ribbons, in September 2011 in Montpellier, France.

She was part of the 2012 Olympic team that reached the team final. Her teammates were Viktoriya Koshel, Noa Palatchy, Moran Buzovski and Marina Shults.
