= Alia Yassin Elkatib =

Egyptian rhythmic gymnast

- Born: August 17, 1995 (age 31)

Gymnastics career
- Discipline: Rhythmic gymnastics
- Country represented: Egypt (2011)

Alia Yassin Elkatib is an Egyptian individual rhythmic gymnast. She represented her nation at international competitions.

She competed at world championships, including at the 2011 World Rhythmic Gymnastics Championships.
