= Inna Yoffe =

Israeli synchronized swimmer

Personal information
- Native name: אינה יופה
- Nationality: Israeli
- Born: February 8, 1988 (age 38) Soviet Union
- Height: 5 ft 3 in (160 cm)
- Weight: 108 lb (49 kg)

Sport
- Sport: Swimming
- Strokes: Synchronised swimming
- Club: Maccabi Kiriyat Ha-Yovel, Jerusalem

Inna Yoffe (Hebrew: אינה יופה; born February 8, 1988) is an Israeli Olympic synchronized swimmer.

== Biography ==
Yoffe is Jewish, and was born in the Soviet Union. She and the Israeli synchronized swimming team train in Jerusalem. She swims for the Maccabi Kiryat-HaYovel club of Jerusalem.

== Synchronized swimming career ==
In 2003, she and partner Anastasia Gloushkov placed 15th in the World Championship duet event (where at age 15, she was the youngest competitor), and sixth in the World Youth Championship.

At the 2004 European Championships in Madrid, Spain, she and Gloushkov finished 9th in duet.

She competed on behalf of Israel at the 2004 Summer Olympics in Athens, Greece in the synchronized swimming duet, in which she came in 17th, along with her partner Gloushkov. She was the youngest member of the Israeli delegation at 16 years of age.

She competed on behalf of Israel at the 2008 Summer Olympics in Beijing, China, in the synchronized swimming duet, in which she and Gloushkov came in 15th. At the 2010 European Championships in Budapest, Hungary, they were 7th in the duet.

She and Gloushkov placed 14th in the synchronized swimming technical duets competition in the 2011 FINA World Aquatics Championships in Shanghai, China. The pair qualified to represent Israel at the 2012 Summer Olympics in London, finishing in 17th place.
