= Louisa Pouli =

Greek-born British rhythmic gymnast

Louisa Pouli (born 29 January 1993 Corfu, Greece) is a competitor in rhythmic gymnastics. Pouli represented Great Britain in the team event at the 2012 London Olympics.

== Life ==
Pouli was born in Corfu, Greece. She started her Rhythmic gymnastics career at the age of four. Pouli trained and competed in Greece until the age of 15. She later moved to Great Britain to pursue her career and become something more than what circumstances in Greece offered her. Louisa soon thrived in England and was chosen to become part of the Group Project which soon became the Team to represent Great Britain at the Olympic Games 2012. She now attends Middlesex university in Hendon, London and studies Dance Performance.

== Television ==
Pouli has made several appearances on television including The One Show, Question of Sport, Dancing on Ice and A League of their own in which she and the remaining members of the rhythmic gymnastic team taught James Corden, John Bishop and Georgie Thompson.
