= Evdokia Loukagkou =

Greek rhythmic gymnast (born 1995)

- Ευδοκία Λουκάγκου
- Born: 26 September 1995 (age 30) Thessaloniki, Greece
- Height: 188 cm (6 ft 2 in)

Gymnastics career
- Discipline: Rhythmic gymnastics
- Country represented: Greece
- Retired: yes

Evdokia Loukagkou (born 26 September 1995) is a Greek rhythmic gymnast. She participated in the London 2012 Olympic Games.

== Career ==
Loukagkou was born and raised in Thessaloniki. At the age of five, she began to train at the AO DIbuy Club in Thessaloniki, and in 2009 she became a member of the Greek national rhythmic gymnastics team.

She participated in the 2012 Olympics in London, the United Kingdom with the Greek group. The other group members were Eleni Doika, Alexia Kyriazi, Stavroula Samara, Vasileia Zachou and Marianthi Zafeiriou. They scored 51.875 points in the qualifying round and ended in 9th place.
