= Elena Todorova =

Bulgarian rhythmic gymnast (born 1994)

- Born: 1 July 1994 (age 32) Targovishte, Bulgaria

Gymnastics career
- Discipline: Rhythmic gymnastics
- Country represented: Bulgaria (2007–2012)
- Retired: yes
Medal record
Group Rhythmic Gymnastics
Representing Bulgaria
World Championships
Gold medal – first place	2011 Montpellier	3 Ribbons/2 Hoop
Bronze medal – third place	2010 Moscow	5 Hoops
Bronze medal – third place	2011 Montpellier	Group all-around
Bronze medal – third place	2011 Montpellier	5 Balls
European Championships
Silver medal – second place	2012 N.Novgorod	3 ribbons + 2 hoops
Bronze medal – third place	2012 N.Novgorod	5 balls
Junior European Championships
Silver medal – second place	2007 Baku	10 Clubs

Elena Todorova (Bulgarian: Елена Тодорова; born 1 July 1994) is a Bulgarian retired group rhythmic gymnast. She competed at the 2012 Summer Olympics and won several medals at the World and European championships.

== Personal life ==
Todorova was born in Targovishte. She was given a pet rabbit by her teammates for her 17th birthday in 2011, and she admired Ukrainian gymnast Anna Bessonova.

== Career ==
Todorova began rhythmic gymnastics in her hometown when she was four years old. She continued training in Targovishte until she was 11, when she transferred to the Levski club.

In 2007, she competed as part of the junior group at the European Championships, where she was the reserve gymnast for both routines. The Bulgarian group won silver in the 10 clubs final.

In the 2009 season, junior groups only competed with 5 ribbons. In April, Todorova competed with the junior group at the International Tournament in Portimão, where they won bronze in the final. She was a starting member at the 2009 European Championships, where the Bulgarian junior group qualified in third but finished in 6th in the final.

At the 2010 European Championships, Todorova competed as a member of the senior group. She was a starting member for the 5 hoops routine and reserve for the mixed apparatus routine. The Bulgarian group finished 6th in the all-around and reached both apparatus finals. Later in the year, they were 5th in the all-around at the World Championships and won bronze in the 5 hoops final.

In 2011, there was no senior group competition at the European Championships, but Todorova was part of the group at the 2011 World Championships. They won bronze in the all-around as well as with 5 balls, and they won gold in the mixed apparatus final.

The next year, Todorova competed at the 2012 European Championships in June; despite being in pain from an old leg injury, she performed in both group routines. The Bulgarian group finished 4th in the all-around, and in the event finals, they won silver in the mixed apparatus routine and bronze with 5 balls. In August, at the 2012 Summer Olympics, the Bulgarian group qualified to the final in 4th place and finished the final in 6th.

Todorova, along with Katrin Velkova, was removed from the national group in March 2013.
