= Jade Faulkner =

British rhythmic gymnast

Jade Faulkner (born 21 December 1993) is a British competitor in rhythmic gymnastics. Born in Coventry, West Midlands, England, Jade Faulkner represented Great Britain in the team event at the 2012 London Olympics. She represented Nigeria at the 2018 Commonwealth Games after changing nation representation.

She currently is a rhythmic gymnastics coach at Olympic Stars, a professional centre of rhythmic gymnastics and ballet in Doha, Qatar.
