= Viktoriya Lenyshyn =

Ukrainian rhythmic gymnast (born 1991)

- Born: 25 May 1991 (age 35)

Gymnastics career
- Discipline: Rhythmic gymnastics
- Country represented: Ukraine; (2010-2012 (?))

Viktoriya Lenyshyn (Ukrainian: Вікторія Андріївна Ленишин; born 25 May 1991, in Lviv) is a Ukrainian group rhythmic gymnast. She represents her nation at international competitions.

She participated at the 2012 Summer Olympics in London. She also competed at world championships, including at the 2010 and 2011 World Rhythmic Gymnastics Championships.
