= Nicole Müller (gymnast, born 1994) =

German rhythmic gymnast

Nicole Mueller
- Born: 14 November 1994 (age 31)

Gymnastics career
- Discipline: Rhythmic gymnastics
- Country represented: Germany (2011–2012 (?))

Nicole Müller (born 14 November 1994) was a German group rhythmic gymnast. She represented her nation at international competitions.

She participated at the 2012 Summer Olympics in London. She also competed at world championships, including at the 2011 World Rhythmic Gymnastics Championships.
