= Rachel Smith (gymnast) =

British rhythmic gymnast

- Full name: Rachel Megan Smith
- Born: 3 January 1993 (age 33) Wyken, Coventry, England
- Height: 1.75 m (5 ft 9 in)

Gymnastics career
- Discipline: Rhythmic gymnastics
- Country represented: United Kingdom
- Club: City of Coventry RGC
- Head coach: Sarah Moon
- Former coach: Marion Sands/Hannah Walker
- Choreographer: Ellen Watson
- Retired: 2013

Rachel Smith (born 3 January 1993) is a rhythmic gymnast. She has competed for Great Britain at European and World championships for rhythmic gymnastics as an individual gymnast and the GBR RG team and also captained the team which competed for Team GB at the 2012 Summer Olympics in London.

== Early life ==
Smith was born on 3 January 1993 in Wyken, Coventry, England to father Robert Smith and mother Vanessa Smith. She attended Ravensdale Primary School, where she began her gymnastics career.

== Gymnastics career ==
Smith started gymnastics at the age of 6 at Ravensdale Primary School, where she was spotted as talented and sent to the City of Coventry RGC, the local gymnastics club. From here she trialled for the Great Britain gymnastics squad located at Lilleshall National Sports Centre, where she was accepted into the performance squad at the age of 8. Smith competed in her first international competition in Russia when she was 9. She has competed at European and World Championships as both an individual and group competitor, as well as competing at the London 2012 Olympic Games. Smith retired in 2013 after a long and illustrious career.
