= Eliora Zholkovsky =

Israeli rhythmic gymnast

- אליאורה ז'ולקובסקי
- Born: 5 March 1993 (age 33) Holon, Israel

Gymnastics career
- Discipline: Rhythmic gymnastics
- Country represented: Israel (2010-2012 (?))
Medal record
Representing Israel
Group Rhythmic Gymnastics
World Championships
| Bronze medal – third place | 2011 Montpellier | Hoop & Ribbon |

Eliora Zholkovsky (Hebrew: אליאורה ז'ולקובסקי; born 5 March 1993) is an Israeli group rhythmic gymnast. She represents her nation at international competitions.

She participated in the 2012 Summer Olympics in London. She also competed at world championships, including at the 2010 and 2011 World Rhythmic Gymnastics Championships.
