= Katrin Velkova =

Bulgarian rhythmic gymnast (born 1991)

- Born: 16 August 1991 (age 35)

Gymnastics career
- Discipline: Rhythmic gymnastics
- Country represented: Bulgaria (2010–2012)
Medal record
Group Rhythmic Gymnastics
Representing Bulgaria
World Championships
Gold medal – first place	2011 Montpellier	3 Ribbons/2 Hoop
Bronze medal – third place	2010 Moscow	5 Hoops
Bronze medal – third place	2011 Montpellier	Group all-around
Bronze medal – third place	2011 Montpellier	5 Balls
European Championships
Silver medal – second place	2012 N.Novgorod	3 ribbons + 2 hoops
Bronze medal – third place	2012 N.Novgorod	5 balls

Katrin Velkova (Bulgarian: Катрин Велкова) (born 16 August 1991) is a Bulgarian former group rhythmic gymnast. She competed at the 2012 Summer Olympics and also won medals at both the World and European championships.

== Personal life ==
Velkova married Marko Kossev, a sambo world champion, in September 2012. Her gymnastics teammates were her bridesmaids.

== Career ==
Velkova began training in gymnastics when she was 7. She initially found it stressful to work with Iliana Raeva, the coach of the national group at the time, and she left on her first day of training after Raeva demanded she repeat an exercise a hundred times, which Velkova was not able to do.

She began to compete as part of the senior national group in 2010. At the European Championships that year, the group placed 6th in the all-around; Velkova competed in both routines. Later that year, at the World Championships, they won bronze in the 5 hoops final after coming 5th in the all-around.

The next year, at the 2011 World Championships, Velkova won bronze in the all-around with her teammates. They also won another bronze in the 5 balls event final, and they won gold with 3 ribbons + 2 hoops.

Her last year of competing was 2012. She competed in the groups mixed apparatus routine at the 2012 European Championships, where they finished 4th in the all-around. However, they won medals in both event finals, silver with 3 ribbons + 2 hoops and bronze with 5 balls. Later that year, she was part of the Bulgarian group that competed at the 2012 Summer Olympics, where they qualified to the group final in 4th and finished in 6th place.

After she retired from competing, she became a coach and founded her own rhythmic gymnastics club.
