= Marina Shults =

Israeli rhythmic gymnast

- מרינה שולץ
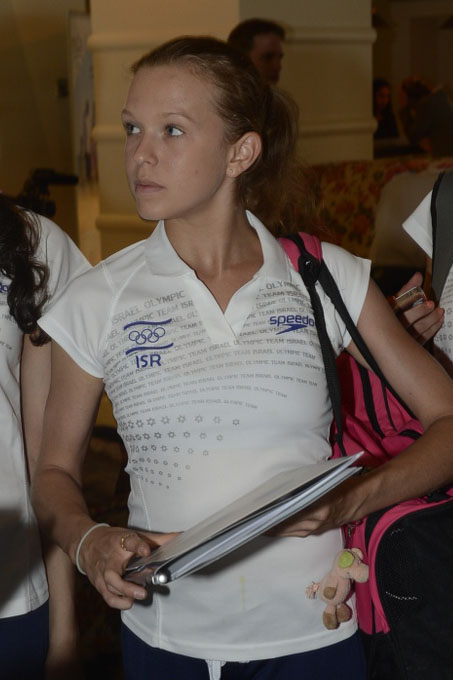

Personal information
- Alternative name: Marina Shulz
- Born: 18 December 1994 (age 31) Chelyabinsk, Russia

Gymnastics career
- Discipline: Rhythmic gymnastics
- Country represented: Israel (2010-2012 (?))
Medal record
Representing Israel
Group Rhythmic Gymnastics
World Championships
Bronze medal – third place	2011 Montpellier	Hoop & Ribbon

Marina Shults (Hebrew: מרינה שולטס; born 18 December 1994 in Chelyabinsk) is an Israeli group rhythmic gymnast. She represents her nation at international competitions.

She participated at the 2012 Summer Olympics in London. She also competed at world championships, including at the 2010 and 2011 World Rhythmic Gymnastics Championships.
