= Moran Buzovski =

Israeli rhythmic gymnast (born 1992)

- מורן בוזובסקי
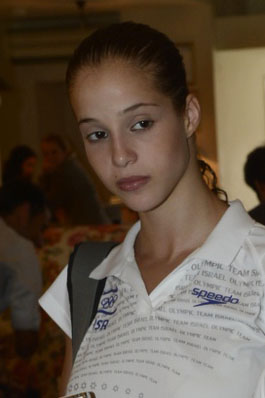
- Moran Buzovski at a consolidation event of the Olympic Committee of Israel in Eilat, 2012

Personal information
- Born: March 23, 1992 (age 34) Petah Tikva, Israel
- Height: 5 ft 8 in (173 cm)

Gymnastics career
- Discipline: Rhythmic gymnastics
- Country represented: Israel
- Club: Maccabi Petah Tikva
- Head coaches: Ela Samofalo; Raya Irgo (national)
Medal record
Representing Israel
Rhythmic Gymnastics
World Championships
Bronze medal – third place	2011 Montpellier	Hoop & Ribbon

Moran Buzovski (Hebrew: מורן בוזובסקי; born March 23, 1992) is a retired Israeli rhythmic gymnast, and a member of the National Israeli Rhythmic Gymnastics Team.

== Early life ==
Buzovski was born in Petah Tikva, Israel. She has a twin sister named Sharon.

== Career ==
Buzovki started training in 1996 and belongs to the club Maccabi Petah Tikva. She started training unintentionally, at the age of 4, when her mother was looking for a hobby for her and her twin sister. She originally was meant to participate in floor gymnastics, but they arrived at the training ground at the wrong time, while a rhythmic gymnastics session was taking place. The coach, Yelena Zlickman encouraged the mother to enroll her twins for a trial. Sharon quit shortly after starting, but Moran stayed on to train.

She competed as part of the Israeli team at the 2012 Summer Olympics and served as captain.

Following her retirement as an athlete, Buzovski has become a trainer in Maccabi Tel-Aviv and in B-MOR schools she founded.
