= Viktoriya Koshel =

Israeli rhythmic gymnast

- ויקטוריה קושל
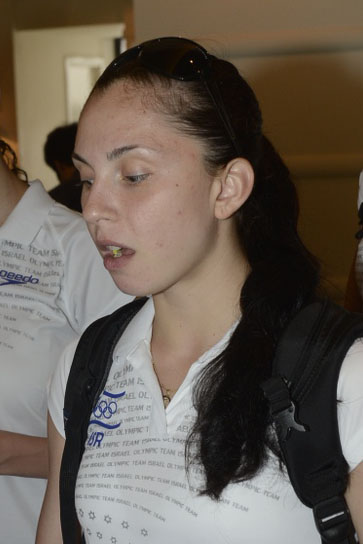
- Victoria Koshel, 2012

Personal information
- Born: 14 April 1991 (age 35)

Gymnastics career
- Discipline: Rhythmic gymnastics
- Country represented: Israel; (2010-2012 (?))
Medal record
Representing Israel
Group Rhythmic Gymnastics
World Championships
Bronze medal – third place	2011 Montpellier	Hoop & Ribbon

Viktoriya Koshel (Hebrew: ויקטוריה קושל; born 14 April 1991) is an Israeli group rhythmic gymnast. She represents her nation at international competitions.

She participated at the 2012 Summer Olympics in London. She also competed at world championships, including at the 2010 and 2011 World Rhythmic Gymnastics Championships.
