= Noa Palatchy =

Israeli rhythmic gymnast

- נועה פלטשי
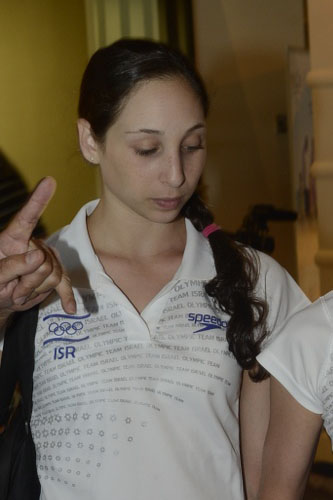

Personal information
- Born: 24 June 1994 (age 32)

Gymnastics career
- Discipline: Rhythmic gymnastics
- Country represented: Israel (2010-2012 (?))
Medal record
Group Rhythmic Gymnastics
Representing Israel
World Championships
Bronze medal – third place	2011 Montpellier	Hoop & Ribbon

Noa Palatchy (Hebrew: נועה פלטשי; born 24 June 1994) is an Israeli group rhythmic gymnast. She represents her nation at international competitions.

She participated at the 2012 Summer Olympics in London. She also competed at world championships, including at the 2010 and 2011 World Rhythmic Gymnastics Championships.
