= Marianthi Zafeiriou =

Greek rhythmic gymnast (born 1994)

- Born: 29 January 1994 (age 32)

Gymnastics career
- Discipline: Rhythmic gymnastics
- Country represented: Greece (2010-2012 (?))

Marianthi Zafeiriou (born 29 January 1994) is a Greek group rhythmic gymnast. She represents her nation at international competitions.

She participated at the 2012 Summer Olympics in London. She also competed at world championships, including at the 2010 and 2011 World Rhythmic Gymnastics Championships.
