= Alexia Kyriazi =

Greek rhythmic gymnast

- Born: December 15, 1995 (age 30)

Gymnastics career
- Discipline: Rhythmic gymnastics
- Country represented: Greece (2011-2012 (?))

Alexia Kyriazi (born 15 December 1995) is a Greek group rhythmic gymnast.

She represents her nation at international competitions. She participated at the 2012 Summer Olympics in London. She also competed at world championships, including at the 2011 World Rhythmic Gymnastics Championships.
