= Vasileia Zachou =

Greek rhythmic gymnast (born 1994)

- Born: 24 April 1994 (age 32)

Gymnastics career
- Discipline: Rhythmic gymnastics
- Country represented: Greece; (2011–2012 (?))

Vasileia Zachou (born 24 April 1994) is a Greek group rhythmic gymnast. She represented her nation at international competitions.

She participated at the 2012 Summer Olympics in London. She also competed at world championships, including at the 2011 World Rhythmic Gymnastics Championships.
