= Belarus at the 2012 Summer Olympics =

- IOC code: BLR
- NOC: Belarus Olympic Committee
- Website: www.noc.by (in Russian and English)

in London
- Competitors: 166 in 20 sports
- Flag bearers: Max Mirnyi (opening); Raman Piatrushenka (closing)
- Medals Ranked 29th: Gold 2 Silver 5 Bronze 3 Total 10

Summer Olympics appearances (overview)
- 1996; 2000; 2004; 2008; 2012; 2016; 2020; 2024; 2028

Other related appearances
- Russian Empire (1900–1912); Poland (1924–1936); Soviet Union (1952–1988); Unified Team (1992); Individual Neutral Athletes (2024)

Belarus competed at the 2012 Summer Olympics in London, United Kingdom, from 27 July to 12 August 2012. This was the nation's fifth appearance at the Summer Olympics in the post-Soviet era. The Belarus Olympic Committee sent a total of 166 athletes to the Games, 90 men and 76 women, to compete in 20 sports.

Belarus left London with a total of 10 medals (2 gold, 5 silver, and 3 bronze), their lowest in Summer Olympic history. Most of these medals were awarded to athletes in sprint canoeing. Sergei Martynov, who won gold for the first time, became the most successful Belarusian shooter in history, with a total of three Olympic medals. Three Belarusian athletes set the nation's historical record to win Olympic medals for the first time in their sporting events, including swimmer Aliaksandra Herasimenia, who took two silver in women's freestyle events. Tennis players and Grand Slam titleholders Max Mirnyi and Victoria Azarenka, who also won the bronze in women's singles, became Belarus's first ever Olympic champions in the mixed doubles event, after beating Great Britain's Andy Murray and Laura Robson. For the first time in its history, Belarus, however, did not win an Olympic medal in athletics and wrestling.

Originally, Belarus had won three gold medals in the nation's total medal count. On 13 August 2012, the International Olympic Committee stripped shot putter Nadzeya Astapchuk of her gold medal after testing positive for the anabolic steroid metenolone, and the gold medal was subsequently awarded to silver medalist Valerie Adams from New Zealand.

== Medalists ==
Medals by sport
Sport	1st place, gold medalist(s)	2nd place, silver medalist(s)	3rd place, bronze medalist(s)	Total
Canoeing	0	2	1	3
Gymnastics	0	1	1	2
Swimming	0	2	0	2
Tennis	1	0	1	2
Shooting	1	0	0	1
Total	2	5	3	10

Medal	Name	Sport	Event	Date
Gold	Sergei Martynov	Shooting	Men's 50 m rifle prone	3 August
Gold	Max Mirnyi; Victoria Azarenka	Tennis	Mixed doubles	5 August
Silver	Aliaksandra Herasimenia	Swimming	Women's 100 m freestyle	2 August
Silver	Aliaksandra Herasimenia	Swimming	Women's 50 m freestyle	4 August
Silver	Andrei Bahdanovich; Aliaksandr Bahdanovich	Canoeing	Men's C-2 1000 m	9 August
Silver	Raman Piatrushenka; Vadzim Makhneu	Canoeing	Men's K-2 200 m	11 August
Silver	Maryna Hancharova; Anastasia Ivankova; Nataliya Leshchyk; Aliaksandra Narkevich; Ksenia Sankovich; Alina Tumilovich	Gymnastics	Women's rhythmic group all-around	12 August
Bronze	Victoria Azarenka	Tennis	Women's singles	4 August
Bronze	Volha Khudzenka; Iryna Pamialova; Nadzeya Papok; Maryna Pautaran	Canoeing	Women's K-4 500 m	8 August
Bronze	Liubov Charkashyna	Gymnastics	Women's rhythmic individual all-around	11 August

== Delegation ==
Belarus Olympic Committee selected a team of 166 athletes, 90 men and 76 women, to compete in 20 sports, surpassing the record by just a single athlete short in Atlanta. Men's football was the only team-based sport in which Belarus had its representation in these Olympic games. There was only a single competitor in archery, and in badminton. Athletics was the largest team by sport, with a total of 49 competitors.

The Belarusian team featured five Olympic champions from Beijing (hammer throwers Aksana Miankova, sprint canoeing brothers Andrei and Aliaksandr Bahdanovich, and sprint kayakers Raman Piatrushenka, and Vadzim Makhneu). Shooters Sergei Martynov and Kanstantsin Lukashyk, and single sculls rower Ekaterina Karsten, competed at their sixth Olympic games, although they first appeared as part of either the Soviet Union (Martynov in 1988) or the Unified Team (Karsten and Lukashyk in 1992). Table tennis player Vladimir Samsonov became the fourth Belarusian athlete to compete at fifth Olympics. Meanwhile, trap shooter Andrei Kavalenka, at age 57, was the oldest athlete of the team, while rhythmic gymnast Nataliya Leshchyk was the youngest at age 17.

Professional tennis player Max Mirnyi, who won nine Grand Slam titles (including two from the U.S. Open) in his career, and competed at his fourth Olympics, became Belarus' flag bearer at the opening ceremony. Karsten, who won a total of five Olympic medals, served as the nation's team captain.

The following is the list of number of competitors participating in the Games. Note that reserves in fencing, field hockey, football, and handball are not counted as athletes:

Sport	Men	Women	Total
Archery	0	1	1
Athletics	14	35	49
Badminton	0	1	1
Boxing	3	0	3
Canoeing	7	5	12
Cycling	3	6	9
Diving	2	0	2
Equestrian	1	1	2
Fencing	3	0	3
Football	18	0	18
Gymnastics	2	9	11
Judo	2	0	2
Modern pentathlon	2	2	4
Rowing	4	1	5
Sailing	1	1	2
Shooting	8	1	9
Swimming	4	4	8
Table tennis	1	2	3
Tennis	2	1	3
Weightlifting	4	4	8
Wrestling	9	2	11
Total	90	76	166

== Archery ==
Athlete	Event	Ranking round		Round of 64	Round of 32	Round of 16	Quarterfinals	Semifinals	Final / BM	
Athlete	Event	Score	Seed	Opposition Score	Opposition Score	Opposition Score	Opposition Score	Opposition Score	Opposition Score	Rank
Katsiaryna Muliuk-Timofeyeva	Women's individual	644	33	Sichenikova (UKR) (32); W 6–4	Ki B-B (KOR) (1); L 2–6	Did not advance				

== Athletics ==
Belarus sent a total of 49 track and field athletes to the London games, after having achieved the required qualifying standards in their respective events (up to a maximum of three athletes in each event at the "A" standard, and one at the "B" standard). Hammer thrower and two-time Olympic medalist Ivan Tsikhan, was initially selected to the team, but IAAF decided to withdraw him from the competition, as a re-test of his sample from Athens was positive. On August 13, International Olympic Committee decided the shot putter Nadzeya Astapchuk, the nation's only track and field medalist, to strip off her gold medal at the London games after she was tested positive for the anabolic steroid metenolone.

Key

- Note–Ranks given for track events are within the athlete's heat only
- Q = Qualified for the next round
- q = Qualified for the next round as a fastest loser or, in field events, by position without achieving the qualifying target
- NR = National record
- N/A = Round not applicable for the event
- Bye = Athlete not required to compete in round

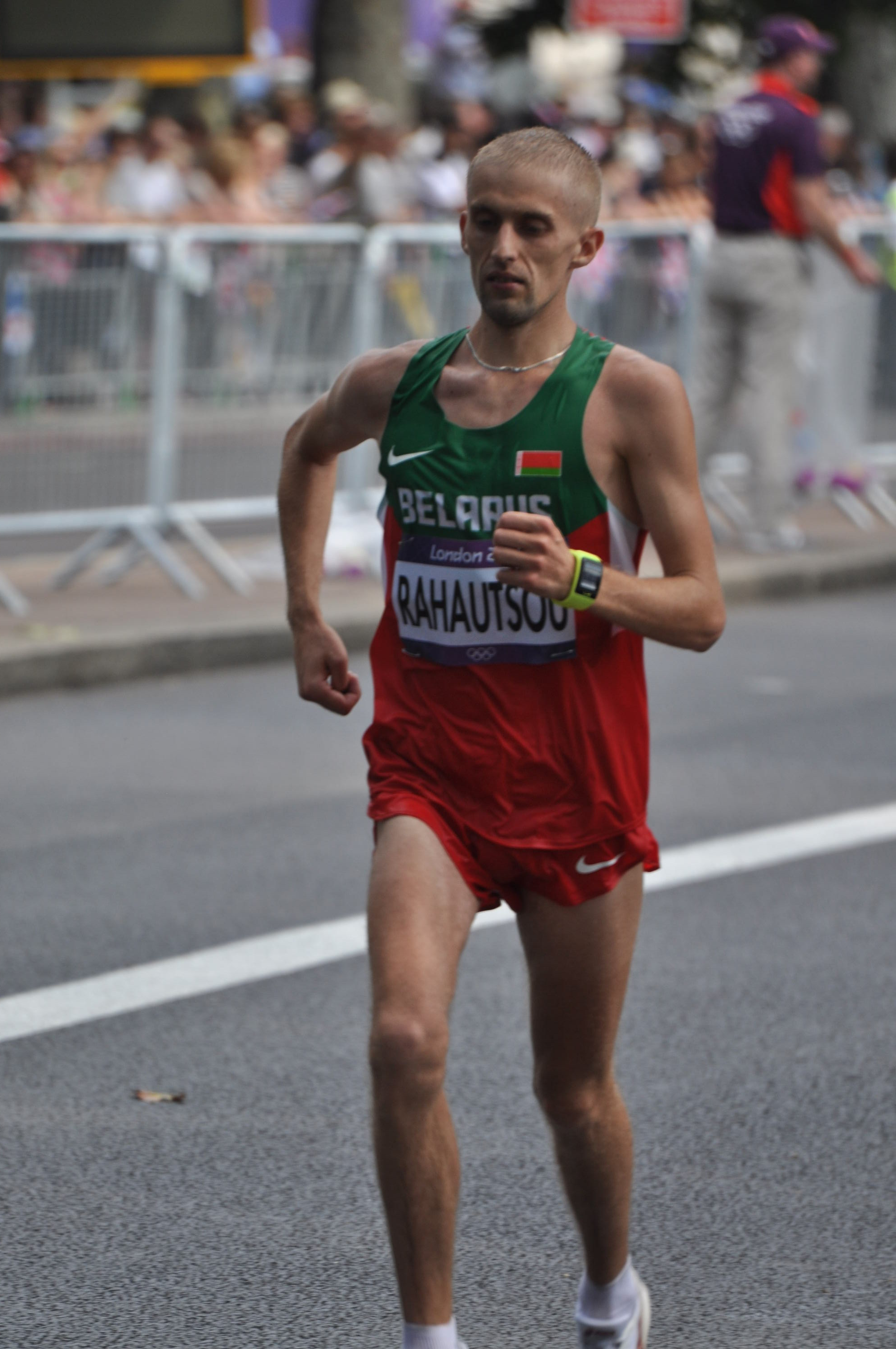
Stsiapan Rahautsou in men's marathon

Men
Track & road events

Athlete	Event	Heat		Semifinal		Final	
Athlete	Event	Result	Rank	Result	Rank	Result	Rank
Anis Ananenka	800 m	1:49.61	7	Did not advance			
Maksim Lynsha	110 m hurdles	13.47	3 Q	13.45	7	Did not advance	
Stsiapan Rahautsou	Marathon	—N/a				2:23:23	64
Dzianis Simanovich	20 km walk	—N/a				1:20:42	12
Ivan Trotski	20 km walk	—N/a				1:21:23	16
Ivan Trotski	50 km walk	—N/a				3:46:09	14

Field events

Athlete	Event	Qualification		Final	
Athlete	Event	Distance	Position	Distance	Position
Andrei Churyla	High jump	NM	—	Did not advance	
Uladzimir Kazlou	Javelin throw	80.06	15	Did not advance	
Pavel Kryvitski	Hammer throw	71.49	28	Did not advance	
Pavel Lyzhyn	Shot put	20.57	6 q	20.69	8
Andrei Mikhnevich	Shot put	19.89	17	Did not advance	
Dzmitry Platnitski	Triple jump	16.62	12 q	16.19	12
Valery Sviatokha	Hammer throw	74.69	12 q	73.13	11
Stanislau Tsivonchyk	Pole vault	5.20	23	Did not advance	

Combined events – Decathlon

Athlete	Event	100 m	LJ	SP	HJ	400 m	110H	DT	PV	JT	1500 m	Final	Rank
Eduard Mikhan	Result	10.74	6.94	14.75	1.93	48.42	14.15	44.42	4.40	55.69	4:38.06	7928	17
Eduard Mikhan	Points	919	799	774	740	889	955	755	731	673	693	7928	17

Women
Track & road events

Athlete	Event	Heat		Quarterfinal		Semifinal		Final	
Athlete	Event	Result	Rank	Result	Rank	Result	Rank	Result	Rank
Maryna Arzamasava	800 m	2:08.45	4	—N/a		Did not advance			
Yuliya Balykina	100 m	Bye		11.70	7	Did not advance			
Hanna Drabenia	20 km walk	—N/a						1:31:58	25
Volha Dubouskaya	Marathon	—N/a						2:39:12	78
Natallia Kareiva	1500 m	4:06.87	3 Q	—N/a		4:02.37	6 q	4:11.58	7
Sviatlana Kouhan	Marathon	—N/a						2:30:26	34
Sviatlana Kudzelich	3000 m steeplechase	9:54.77	14	—N/a				Did not advance	
Katsiaryna Paplauskaya	100 m hurdles	DSQ		—N/a		Did not advance			
Nastassia Staravoitava	Marathon	—N/a						2:30:25	33
Alina Talai	100 m hurdles	12.71	1 Q	—N/a		12.84	4	Did not advance	
Sviatlana Usovich	400 m	52.40	5	—N/a		Did not advance			
Nastassia Yatsevich	20 km walk	—N/a						1:35:41	48
Volha Astashka; Yuliya Balykina; Katsiaryna Hanchar; Hanna Liapeshka; Alena Neumiarzhitskaya; Katsiaryna Shumak; Alina Talai	4 × 100 m relay	43.90	7	—N/a				Did not advance	
Iryna Khliustava; Alena Kiyevich; Hanna Tashpulatava; Ilona Usovich; Sviatlana Usovich; Yulyana Yushchanka	4 × 400 m relay	3:26.52	5	—N/a				Did not advance	

Field events

Athlete	Event	Qualification		Final	
Athlete	Event	Distance	Position	Distance	Position
Nadzeya Astapchuk	Shot put	20.76	1 Q	~~21.36~~	DSQ*
Yanina Karolchyk-Pravalinskaya	Shot put	17.87	18	Did not advance	
Alena Matoshka	Hammer throw	67.03	30	Did not advance	
Aksana Miankova	Hammer throw	73.10	8 Q	74.40	7
Natallia Mikhnevich	Shot put	18.60	10 q	18.42	11
Nastassia Mironchyk-Ivanova	Long jump	6.66	6 q	6.72	7
Maryna Novik	Javelin throw	54.31	33	Did not advance	
Kseniya Pryiemka-Dziatsuk	Triple jump	NM	—	Did not advance	
Veronika Shutkova	Long jump	6.40	12 q	6.54	10
Anastasiya Shvedova	Pole vault	4.40	17	Did not advance	
Sviatlana Siarova	Discus throw	56.70	33	Did not advance	
Volha Sudarava	Long jump	6.38	14	Did not advance	

* Initially awarded gold in the shot put, Astapchuk was disqualified, and stripped of her medal, following positive drugs tests during the Games.

Combined events – Heptathlon

Athlete	Event	100H	HJ	SP	200 m	LJ	JT	800 m	Final	Rank
Yana Maksimava	Result	13.97	1.89	14.09	25.43	5.99	42.33	2:13.37	6198	17
Yana Maksimava	Points	983	1093	800	848	846	712	916	6198	17

== Badminton ==
Athlete	Event	Group Stage			Round of 16	Quarterfinal	Semifinal	Final / BM	
Athlete	Event	Opposition Score	Opposition Score	Rank	Opposition Score	Opposition Score	Opposition Score	Opposition Score	Rank
Alesia Zaitsava	Women's singles	Nedelcheva (BUL); L 7–21, 19–21	Firdasari (INA); L 10–21, 21–16, 14–21	3	Did not advance				

== Boxing ==
Men

Athlete	Event	Round of 32	Round of 16	Quarterfinals	Semifinals	Final	
Athlete	Event	Opposition Result	Opposition Result	Opposition Result	Opposition Result	Opposition Result	Rank
Vazgen Safaryants	Lightweight	Bye	Han S-C (KOR); L 13–13^{+}	Did not advance			
Mikhail Dauhaliavets	Light heavyweight	Hvodzyk (UKR); L 10–18	Did not advance				
Siarhei Karneyeu	Heavyweight	—N/a	Castillo (ECU); W 21–12	Mammadov (AZE); L 19–19^{+}	Did not advance		

== Canoeing ==
=== Sprint ===
Belarus has so far qualified boats for the following events

Men

Athlete	Event	Heats		Semifinals		Final	
Athlete	Event	Time	Rank	Time	Rank	Time	Rank
Dzianis Harazha	C-1 200 m	41.290	2 Q	41.427	2 FA	43.545	5
Aleh Yurenia	K-1 1000 m	3:36.012	3 Q	3:29.825	2 FA	3:32.396	6
Aliaksandr Zhukovski	C-1 1000 m	4:06.190	3 Q	3:54.002	4 FA	3:51.166	7
Aliaksandr Bahdanovich; Andrei Bahdanovich	C-2 1000 m	3:42.599	3 Q	3:36.540	2 FA	3:35.206	2nd place, silver medalist(s)
Vadzim Makhneu; Raman Piatrushenka	K-2 200 m	33.129	1 Q	32.641	1 FA	34.266	2nd place, silver medalist(s)

Women

Athlete	Event	Heats		Semifinals		Final	
Athlete	Event	Time	Rank	Time	Rank	Time	Rank
Marharyta Tsishkevich	K-1 200 m	43.841	5 Q	43.033	8	Did not advance	
Marharyta Tsishkevich	K-1 500 m	2:01.216	6 Q	DSQ		Did not advance	
Volha Khudzenka; Maryna Pautaran	K-2 500 m	1:44.568	4 Q	1:43.152	5 FB	1:44.407	9
Volha Khudzenka; Iryna Pamialova; Nadzeya Papok; Maryna Pautaran	K-4 500 m	1:33.676	3 Q	1:30.883	2 FA	1:31.400	3rd place, bronze medalist(s)

Qualification Legend: FA = Qualify to final (medal); FB = Qualify to final B (non-medal)

== Cycling ==
=== Road ===
Men

Athlete	Event	Time	Rank
Yauheni Hutarovich	Men's road race	5:46:37	53
Vasil Kiryienka	Men's road race	Did not finish	
Vasil Kiryienka	Men's time trial	54:30.29	12
Branislau Samoilau	Men's road race	Did not finish	
Alena Amialiusik	Women's road race	3:35:36	15

=== Track ===
Sprint

Athlete	Event	Qualification		Round 1	Repechage 1	Round 2	Repechage 2	Quarterfinals	Semifinals	Final	
Athlete	Event	Time Speed (km/h)	Rank	Opposition Time Speed (km/h)	Opposition Time Speed (km/h)	Opposition Time Speed (km/h)	Opposition Time Speed (km/h)	Opposition Time Speed (km/h)	Opposition Time Speed (km/h)	Opposition Time Speed (km/h)	Rank
Olga Panarina	Women's sprint	11.080; 64.981	5	Lee H-j (KOR); W 11.608; 62.026	Bye	Krupeckaitė (LTU); L	Sullivan (CAN); Hansen (NZL); W 11.443; 62.920	Pendleton (GBR); L	Did not advance	5th place final Krupeckaitė (LTU); Guerra (CUB); Shulika (UKR); L	8

Pursuit

Athlete	Event	Qualification		Semifinals		Final	
Athlete	Event	Time	Rank	Opponent Results	Rank	Opponent Results	Rank
Alena Dylko; Aksana Papko; Tatsiana Sharakova	Women's team pursuit	3:22.850	8 Q	New Zealand; 3:21.942	8	Germany; 3:20.245	7

* Maryia Lohvinava was reserve for the women's team pursuit but did not compete.

Keirin

Athlete	Event	1st Round	Repechage	2nd Round	Final
Athlete	Event	Rank	Rank	Rank	Rank
Olga Panarina	Women's keirin	6 R	5	Did not advance	15

Omnium

Athlete	Event	Flying lap		Points race		Elimination race	Individual pursuit		Scratch race	Time trial		Total points	Rank
Athlete	Event	Time	Rank	Points	Rank	Rank	Time	Rank	Rank	Time	Rank	Total points	Rank
Tatsiana Sharakova	Women's omnium	14.701	12	28	2	15	3:38.301	5	12	36.748	13	59	9

== Diving ==
Belarus has qualified in the following events.

Men

Athlete	Event	Preliminaries		Semifinals		Final	
Athlete	Event	Points	Rank	Points	Rank	Points	Rank
Timofei Hordeichik	10 m platform	350.05	31	Did not advance			
Vadim Kaptur	10 m platform	420.60	21	Did not advance			

== Equestrian ==
Eventing

Athlete	Horse	Event	Dressage		Cross-country			Jumping						Total	
Athlete	Horse	Event	Dressage		Cross-country			Qualifier			Final			Total	
Athlete	Horse	Event	Penalties	Rank	Penalties	Total	Rank	Penalties	Total	Rank	Penalties	Total	Rank	Penalties	Rank
Aliaksandr Faminou	Pasians	Individual	63.78	68	52.80	116.50	57	34.00	150.50	52	Did not advance			150.50	52
Alena Tseliapushkina	Passat	Individual	69.10	70	Eliminated			Did not advance							

== Fencing ==
Belarus has qualified 3 fencers.

Men

Athlete	Event	Round of 64	Round of 32	Round of 16	Quarterfinal	Semifinal	Final / BM	
Athlete	Event	Opposition Score	Opposition Score	Opposition Score	Opposition Score	Opposition Score	Opposition Score	Rank
Aliaksandr Buikevich	Individual sabre	Bye	Apithy (FRA); W 15–11	Dumitrescu (ROU); L 6–15	Did not advance			
Dmitri Lapkes	Individual sabre	Bye	Beaudry (CAN); W 15–10	Morehouse (USA); L 13–15	Did not advance			
Valery Pryiemka	Individual sabre	Honeybone (GBR); W 9–15	Montano (ITA); L 9–15	Did not advance				
Aliaksandr Buikevich; Dmitri Lapkes; Aliaksei Likhacheuski; Valery Pryiemka	Team sabre	—N/a			Italy; L 44–45	Classification semi-final Germany; L 40–45	7th place final United States; W 45–35	7

== Football ==
Belarus men's football team qualified for the event after win a play-off of the 2011 UEFA European Under-21 Football Championship.

- Men's team event – 1 team of 18 players

=== Men's tournament ===
Team roster

The following is the Belarus squad in the men's football tournament of the 2012 Summer Olympics.

Coach: Georgi Kondratiev

No.	Pos.	Player	Date of birth (age)	Caps	Goals	2012 club
1	GK	Alyaksandr Hutar	18 April 1989 (aged 23)			(Football Federation of Belarus) BATE Borisov
2	MF	Stanislaw Drahun* (c)	4 June 1988 (aged 24)			(Football Federation of Belarus) Dinamo Minsk
3	DF	Ihar Kuzmyanok	6 July 1990 (aged 22)			(Football Federation of Belarus) Gomel
4	DF	Syarhey Palitsevich	9 April 1990 (aged 22)			(Football Federation of Belarus) Dinamo Minsk
5	MF	Dzmitry Baha	4 January 1990 (aged 22)			(Football Federation of Belarus) BATE Borisov
6	DF	Alyaksey Hawrylovich	5 January 1990 (aged 22)			(Football Federation of Belarus) Naftan Novopolotsk
7	DF	Maksim Vitus	February 11, 1989 (aged 23)			(Football Federation of Belarus) Neman Grodno
8	FW	Sergei Kornilenko*	14 June 1983 (aged 29)			(Russian Football Union) Krylia Sovetov
9	FW	Uladzimir Khvashchynski	10 May 1990 (aged 22)			(Football Federation of Belarus) Brest
10	MF	Renan Bressan*	3 November 1988 (aged 23)			(Football Federation of Belarus) BATE Borisov
11	FW	Andrey Varankow	8 February 1989 (aged 23)			(Football Federation of Belarus) Neman Grodno
12	DF	Alyaksey Kazlow	11 July 1989 (aged 23)			(Football Federation of Belarus) Torpedo Zhodino
13	MF	Illya Aleksiyevich	10 February 1991 (aged 21)			(Football Federation of Belarus) BATE Borisov
14	FW	Yahor Zubovich	1 June 1989 (aged 23)			(Football Federation of Belarus) Naftan Novopolotsk
15	MF	Artsyom Salavey	1 November 1990 (aged 21)			(Football Federation of Belarus) Torpedo Zhodino
16	MF	Mikhail Gordeichuk	23 October 1989 (aged 22)			(Football Federation of Belarus) Belshina Bobruisk
17	DF	Dzyanis Palyakow	17 April 1991 (aged 21)			(Football Federation of Belarus) BATE Borisov
18	GK	Andrey Shcharbakow	31 January 1991 (aged 21)			(Football Federation of Belarus) BATE Borisov
19	FW	Maksim Skavysh	13 November 1989 (aged 22)			(Football Federation of Belarus) Belshina Bobruisk

* Over-aged player.

Group play

Pos	Team	Pld	W	D	L	GF	GA	GD	Pts	Qualification
1	Brazil	3	3	0	0	9	3	+6	9	Advance to knockout stage
2	Egypt	3	1	1	1	6	5	+1	4	Advance to knockout stage
3	Belarus	3	1	0	2	3	6	−3	3	
4	New Zealand	3	0	1	2	1	5	−4	1	

Source: FIFA
Rules for classification: Group stage tiebreakers
26 July 2012
19:45

Belarus	1–0	New Zealand
Baha 45+1'	Report

City of Coventry Stadium, Coventry
Attendance: 14,457
Referee: Bakary Gassama (Gambia)

29 July 2012
15:00

Brazil	3–1	Belarus
Pato 15'; Neymar 65'; Oscar 90+3'	Report	Bressan 8'

Old Trafford, Manchester
Attendance: 66,212
Referee: Yuichi Nishimura (Japan)

1 August 2012
14:30

Egypt	3–1	Belarus
Salah 56'; Mohsen 73'; Aboutrika 79'	Report	Varankow 87'

Hampden Park, Glasgow
Attendance: 8,732
Referee: Roberto García (Mexico)

== Gymnastics ==
=== Artistic ===
Men

Athlete	Event	Qualification								Final							
Athlete	Event	Apparatus						Total	Rank	Apparatus						Total	Rank
Athlete	Event	F	PH	R	V	PB	HB	Total	Rank	F	PH	R	V	PB	HB	Total	Rank
Dzmitry Kaspiarovich	Vault	—N/a			16.333	—N/a		16.333	9	Did not advance							

Women

Athlete	Event	Qualification						Final					
Athlete	Event	Apparatus				Total	Rank	Apparatus				Total	Rank
Athlete	Event	F	V	UB	BB	Total	Rank	F	V	UB	BB	Total	Rank
Nastassia Marachkouskaya	Vault	—N/a	13.800	—N/a		13.800	10	Did not advance					
Nastassia Marachkouskaya	Balance beam	—N/a			13.558	13.800	35	Did not advance					

=== Rhythmic ===
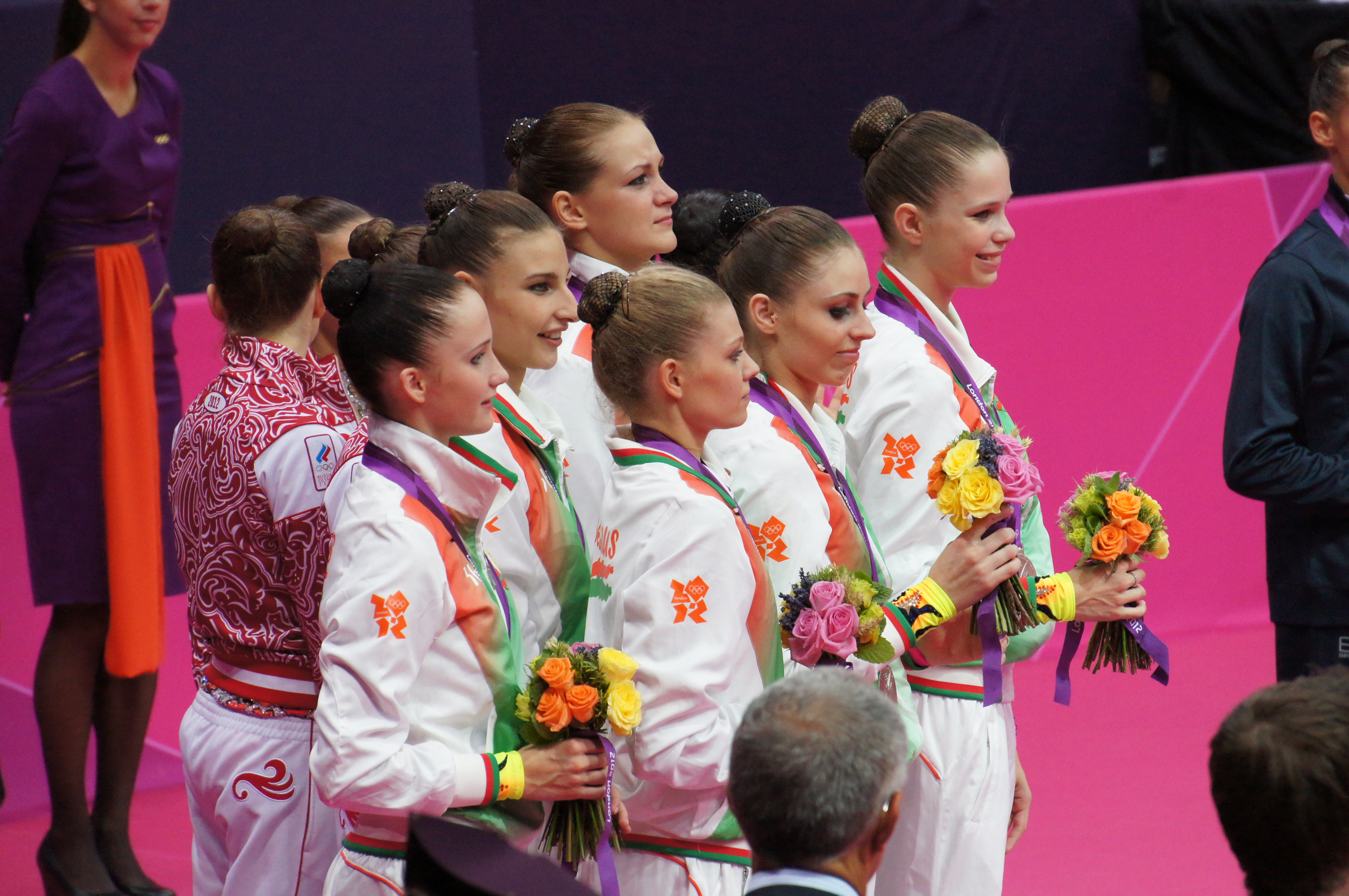
Belarus takes the silver medal in team-all around rhythmic gymnastics.

Athlete	Event	Qualification						Final					
Athlete	Event	Hoop	Ball	Clubs	Ribbon	Total	Rank	Hoop	Ball	Clubs	Ribbon	Total	Rank
Liubov Charkashyna	Individual	28.050	28.400	27.450	26.550	110.450	5 Q	28.100	28.000	27.525	28.075	111.700	3rd place, bronze medalist(s)
Melitina Staniouta	Individual	27.500	26.700	27.600	26.875	108.675	12	Did not advance					

Athlete	Event	Qualification				Final			
Athlete	Event	5 balls	3 ribbons 2 hoops	Total	Rank	5 balls	3 ribbons 2 hoops	Total	Rank
Maryna Hancharova; Anastasia Ivankova; Nataliya Leshchyk; Aliaksandra Narkevich; Ksenia Sankovich; Alina Tumilovich	Group	27.900	26.850	54.750	3 Q	27.825	27.675	55.500	2nd place, silver medalist(s)

=== Trampoline ===
Athlete	Event	Qualification		Final	
Athlete	Event	Score	Rank	Score	Rank
Viachaslau Modzel	Men's	103.880	12	Did not advance	
Tatsiana Piatrenia	Women's	104.755	3	55.670	5

== Judo ==
Men

Athlete	Event	Round of 32	Round of 16	Quarterfinals	Semifinals	Repechage	Final / BM	
Athlete	Event	Opposition Result	Opposition Result	Opposition Result	Opposition Result	Opposition Result	Opposition Result	Rank
Yauhen Biadulin	Men's −100 kg	Schmidt (ARG); W 1001–0000	Khaibulaev (RUS); L 0003–0111	Did not advance				
Ihar Makarau	Men's +100 kg	El Shehaby (EGY); W 0021–0002	Kamikawa (JPN); W 0011–0001	Kim S-M (KOR); L 0002–0011	Did not advance	Brayson (CUB); W 1001–0000	Tölzer (GER); L 0001–1000	5

== Modern pentathlon ==
Belarus has qualified four athletes in modern pentathlon.

Athlete	Event	Fencing (épée one touch)			Swimming (200 m freestyle)			Riding (show jumping)			Combined: shooting/running (10 m air pistol)/(3000 m)			Total points	Final rank
Athlete	Event	Results	Rank	MP points	Time	Rank	MP points	Penalties	Rank	MP points	Time	Rank	MP Points	Total points	Final rank
Dzmitry Meliakh	Men's	17–18	=13	808	2:03.67	13	1316	172	31	1028	11:33.18	33	2228	5380	30
Stanislau Zhurauliou	Men's	20–15	=6	880	2:06.80	21	1280	80	19	1120	10:58.10	20	2368	5648	16
Anastasiya Prokopenko	Women's	15–20	=25	760	2:28.50	33	1020	60	12	1140	11:06.00 OR	1	2336	5256	6
Hanna Vasilionak	Women's	16–19	=22	784	2:32.87	36	968	184	31	1016	12:49.61	29	1924	4692	32

== Rowing ==
Belarus has qualified 2 boats.

Men

Athlete	Event	Heats		Repechage		Semifinals		Final	
Athlete	Event	Time	Rank	Time	Rank	Time	Rank	Time	Rank
Aliaksandr Kazubouski; Vadzim Lialin; Dzainis Mihal; Stanislau Shcharbachenia	Four	5:53.26	3 SA/B	Bye		6:05.26	5 FB	6:09.31	7

Women

Athlete	Event	Heats		Repechage		Quarterfinals		Semifinals		Final	
Athlete	Event	Time	Rank	Time	Rank	Time	Rank	Time	Rank	Time	Rank
Ekaterina Karsten-Khodotovitch	Single sculls	7:30.31	1 QF	Bye		7:42.00	2 SA/B	7:44.94	3 FA	8:02.86	5

Qualification Legend: FA=Final A (medal); FB=Final B (non-medal); FC=Final C (non-medal); FD=Final D (non-medal); FE=Final E (non-medal); FF=Final F (non-medal); SA/B=Semifinals A/B; SC/D=Semifinals C/D; SE/F=Semifinals E/F; QF=Quarterfinals; R=Repechage

== Sailing ==
Belarus has so far qualified 1 boat for each of the following events

Men

Athlete	Event	Race											Net points	Final rank
Athlete	Event	1	2	3	4	5	6	7	8	9	10	M*	Net points	Final rank
Mikalai Zhukavets	RS:X	26	22	23	14	26	16	27	21	~~DNF~~	28	EL	167	27

Women

Athlete	Event	Race											Net points	Final rank
Athlete	Event	1	2	3	4	5	6	7	8	9	10	M*	Net points	Final rank
Tatiana Drozdovskaya	Laser Radial	10	7	23	16	16	13	19	16	~~DSQ~~	18	EL	138	15

M = Medal race; EL = Eliminated – did not advance into the medal race

== Shooting ==
Belarus has ensured seven quota places in the shooting events at the Games.

Men

Athlete	Event	Qualification		Final	
Athlete	Event	Points	Rank	Points	Rank
Vitali Bubnovich	50 m rifle 3 positions	1164	17	Did not advance	
Vitali Bubnovich	10 m air rifle	595	11	Did not advance	
Illia Charheika	10 m air rifle	597	5 Q	698.6	7
Yury Dauhapolau	10 m air pistol	571	30	Did not advance	
Andrei Kavalenka	Trap	101	34	Did not advance	
Andrei Kazak	50 m pistol	547	31	Did not advance	
Kanstantsin Lukashyk	50 m pistol	547	30	Did not advance	
Kanstantsin Lukashyk	10 m air pistol	582	11	Did not advance	
Sergei Martynov	50 m rifle prone	600	1 Q	705.5	1st place, gold medalist(s)
Yury Shcherbatsevich	50 m rifle 3 positions	1171	4 Q	1267.3	8
Yury Shcherbatsevich	50 m rifle prone	591	30	Did not advance	

Women

Athlete	Event	Qualification		Final	
Athlete	Event	Points	Rank	Points	Rank
Viktoria Chaika	25 m pistol	578	25	Did not advance	
Viktoria Chaika	10 m air pistol	385	6 Q	485.2	5

== Swimming ==
Belarus sent a total of 8 swimmers at the London games, after having achieved qualifying standards in their respective events (up to a maximum of 2 swimmers in each event at the Olympic Qualifying Time (OQT), and 1 at the Olympic Selection Time (OST)): Belarus left London with a remarkable milestone in swimming, winning two silver medals by Aliaksandra Herasimenia in the women's 50 m freestyle and 100 m freestyle events, respectively.

Men

Athlete	Event	Heat		Semifinal		Final	
Athlete	Event	Time	Rank	Time	Rank	Time	Rank
Pavel Sankovich	100 m backstroke	54.53 NR	18	Did not advance			
Pavel Sankovich	100 m butterfly	53.47	33	Did not advance			
Yury Suvorau	400 m individual medley	4:23.06 NR	=26	—N/a		Did not advance	
Yauhen Tsurkin	100 m freestyle	50.53	34	Did not advance			
Uladzimir Zhyharau	1500 m freestyle	15:48.67	30	—N/a		Did not advance	

Women

Athlete	Event	Heat		Semifinal		Final	
Athlete	Event	Time	Rank	Time	Rank	Time	Rank
Aliaksandra Herasimenia	50 m freestyle	24.76	5 Q	24.45 NR	2 Q	24.28 NR	2nd place, silver medalist(s)
Aliaksandra Herasimenia	100 m freestyle	53.63	4 Q	53.78	7 Q	53.38	2nd place, silver medalist(s)
Aliaksandra Herasimenia	100 m butterfly	58.50	13 Q	58.41	13	Did not advance	
Sviatlana Khakhlova	50 m freestyle	25.36	20	Did not advance			
Aksana Dziamidava; Aliaksandra Herasimenia; Sviatlana Khakhlova; Yuliya Khitraya	4 × 100 m freestyle relay	3:40.67	13	—N/a		Did not advance	

== Table tennis ==
Belarus has qualified two athletes for singles table tennis events. Based on their world rankings as of 16 May 2011 Vladimir Samsonov has qualified for the men's event and Viktoria Pavlovich for the women's.

Athlete	Event	Preliminary round	Round 1	Round 2	Round 3	Round 4	Quarterfinals	Semifinals	Final / BM	
Athlete	Event	Opposition Result	Opposition Result	Opposition Result	Opposition Result	Opposition Result	Opposition Result	Opposition Result	Opposition Result	Rank
Vladimir Samsonov	Men's singles	Bye			Henzell (AUS); W 4–3	Zhang J (CHN); L 3–4	Did not advance			
Viktoria Pavlovich	Women's singles	Bye			Silbereisen (GER); W 4–2	Wang Y (SIN); L 3–4	Did not advance			
Aleksandra Privalova	Women's singles	Bye	Xing H (CGO); W 4–2	Liu J (AUT); L 2–4	Did not advance					

== Tennis ==
Belarus has qualified three athletes for tennis events. After losing to U.S. tennis star Serena Williams in the semi-finals, Victoria Azarenka managed to win the bronze medal in the women's singles against Russia's Maria Kirilenko. The following day, Azarenka and her partner Max Mirnyi defeated Great Britain's Andy Murray, men's singles champion, and his partner Laura Robson to win the gold medal during the final match in the first ever mixed doubles event. Azarenka and Mirnyi, not only claimed the title, but also set the nation's historical milestone to their sport.

Athlete	Event	Round of 64	Round of 32	Round of 16	Quarterfinals	Semifinals	Final / BM	
Athlete	Event	Opposition Score	Opposition Score	Opposition Score	Opposition Score	Opposition Score	Opposition Score	Rank
Alexander Bury; Max Mirnyi	Men's doubles	—N/a	Bhupathi / Bopanna (IND); L 7–6^{(7-4)}, 6–7^{(7-4)}, 8-6	Did not advance				
Victoria Azarenka	Women's singles	Begu (ROU); W 6–1, 3–6, 6–1	Martínez (ESP); W 6–1, 6–2	Petrova (RUS); W 7–6^{(8–6)}, 6–4	Kerber (GER); W 6–4, 7–5	S. Williams (USA); L 1–6, 2–6	Kirilenko (RUS); W 6–3, 6–4	3rd place, bronze medalist(s)
Victoria Azarenka; Max Mirnyi	Mixed doubles	—N/a		Kerber / Petzschner (GER); W 6–2, 6–2	Paes / Mirza (IND); W 7–5, 7–6^{(7–5)}	Raymond / M. Bryan (USA); W 3–6, 6–4, [10–7]	Robson / Murray (GBR); W 2–6, 6–3, [10–8]	1st place, gold medalist(s)

== Weightlifting ==
Belarus has qualified 4 men and 4 women.

Men

Athlete	Event	Snatch		Clean & Jerk		Total	Rank
Athlete	Event	Result	Rank	Result	Rank	Total	Rank
Andrei Rybakou	−85 kg	~~175~~	DNF	—	—	—	DNF
Mikalai Novikau	−85 kg	167	6	196	9	363	8
Aliaksandr Makaranka	−94 kg	175	=7	209	11	384	10
Yauheni Zharnasek	+105 kg	196	7	230	9	426	9

Women

Athlete	Event	Snatch		Clean & Jerk		Total	Rank
Athlete	Event	Result	Rank	Result	Rank	Total	Rank
Nastassia Novikava	−58 kg	103	=4	127	7	230	7
Dzina Sazanavets	−69 kg	115	=1	141	4	256	4
Maryna Shkermankova	−69 kg	~~113~~	~~=4~~	~~143~~	~~=2~~	~~256~~	DSQ
Iryna Kulesha	−75 kg	~~121~~	~~3~~	~~148~~	~~3~~	~~269~~	DSQ

== Wrestling ==
Belarus has qualified eleven quotas.

Key:

- VT - Victory by Fall.
- PP - Decision by Points - the loser with technical points.
- PO - Decision by Points - the loser without technical points.

Men's freestyle

Athlete	Event	Qualification	Round of 16	Quarterfinal	Semifinal	Repechage 1	Repechage 2	Final / BM	
Athlete	Event	Opposition Result	Opposition Result	Opposition Result	Opposition Result	Opposition Result	Opposition Result	Opposition Result	Rank
Ali Shabanau	−66 kg	Bye	Frayer (USA); W 3–0 ^{PO}	Hasanov (AZE); L 1–3 ^{PP}	Did not advance				10
Soslan Gattsiev	−84 kg	Bye	Louafi (ALG); W 3–1 ^{PP}	Zvirbulis (LAT); W 3–1 ^{PP}	Espinal (PUR); L 1–3 ^{PP}	Bye		Marsagishvili (GEO); L 1–3 ^{PP}	5
Ruslan Sheikhau	−96 kg	Bye	Gazyumov (AZE); L 0–3 ^{PO}	Did not advance					17
Alexei Shemarov	−120 kg	Bye	Ligeti (HUN); W 3–1 ^{PP}	Dlagnev (USA); L 1–3 ^{PP}	Did not advance				8

Men's Greco-Roman

Athlete	Event	Qualification	Round of 16	Quarterfinal	Semifinal	Repechage 1	Repechage 2	Final / BM	
Athlete	Event	Opposition Result	Opposition Result	Opposition Result	Opposition Result	Opposition Result	Opposition Result	Opposition Result	Rank
Elbek Tazhyieu	−55 kg	Bye	Hasegawa (JPN); L 0–3 ^{PO}	Did not advance					16
Aliaksandr Kikiniou	−74 kg	Bye	Dilmukhamedov (KAZ); W 3–0 ^{PO}	Julfalakyan (ARM); L 0–3 ^{PO}	Did not advance	Bye	Kobonov (KGZ); W 3–0 ^{PO}	Ahmadov (AZE); L 1–3 ^{PP}	5
Alim Selimau	−84 kg	Bye	Khugayev (RUS); L 0–3 ^{PO}	Did not advance		Bye	Gadzhiyev (KAZ); L 1–3 ^{PP}	Did not advance	12
Tsimafei Dzeinichenka	−96 kg	Abdelfatah (EGY); W 3–1 ^{PP}	Arusaar (EST); W 3–1 ^{PP}	Guri (BUL); W 3–0 ^{PO}	Totrov (RUS); L 0–3 ^{PO}	Bye		Lidberg (SWE); L 1–3 ^{PO}	5
Ioseb Chugoshvili	−120 kg	Bye	Nabi (EST); L 1–3 ^{PP}	Did not advance		Bye	Banak (POL); W 3–0 ^{PO}	Eurén (SWE); L 1–3 ^{PP}	5

Women's freestyle

Athlete	Event	Qualification	Round of 16	Quarterfinal	Semifinal	Repechage 1	Repechage 2	Final / BM	
Athlete	Event	Opposition Result	Opposition Result	Opposition Result	Opposition Result	Opposition Result	Opposition Result	Opposition Result	Rank
Vanesa Kaladzinskaya	−48 kg	Bye	Eshimova (KAZ); W 5–0 ^{VT}	Huynh (CAN); L 0–3 ^{PO}	Did not advance				8
Vasilisa Marzaliuk	−72 kg	Zlateva (BUL); L 0–3 ^{PO}	Did not advance			Fransson (SWE); W 3–1 ^{PP}	Ali (CMR); W 3–0 ^{PO}	Unda (ESP); L 0–3 ^{PO}	5
