= Gymnastics at the 2012 Summer Olympics =

Gymnastics at the Games of the XXX Olympiad
- Pictograms for Artistic gymnastics (left), Rhythmic gymnastics (center), and Trampolining (right)
- Venue: North Greenwich Arena (trampoline, artistic); Wembley Arena (rhythmic)
- Dates: 28 July – 12 August 2012

Three gymnastics disciplines were contested at the 2012 Olympic Games in London: artistic gymnastics, rhythmic gymnastics and trampolining. The trampoline events were held at the North Greenwich Arena (normally called The O2 Arena) from 3 to 4 August; the artistic events were also held at the North Greenwich Arena, from 28 July to 7 August. The rhythmic gymnastics events took place at Wembley Arena from 9 to 12 August.

A total of 54 medals were awarded across the three disciplines. The most successful nation was China, winning five gold medals and 12 in total. Brazil and South Korea won their first gold medals in the discipline in the Summer Olympic Games history. Yevgeniya Kanayeva of Russia marked history by becoming the first back-to-back Olympic champion at the individual all-around in rhythmic gymnastics.

== Qualification ==
Qualification was based on the results of the 2011 World Rhythmic Gymnastics Championships held in Montpellier, France, from 19 to 25 September; the 2011 World Artistic Gymnastics Championships in Tokyo, Japan, from 7–16 October; the 2011 Trampoline World Championships in Birmingham, United Kingdom, from 17 to 20 November; and Olympic test events held in January 2012 at the North Greenwich Arena.

== Schedule ==
Q	Qualification	F	Final

Artistic (North Greenwich Arena)
Event↓/Date →	Sat 28	Sun 29	Mon 30	Tue 31	Wed 1	Thur 2	Sun 5	Mon 6	Tue 7
Men's individual all-around	Q				F				
Men's team all-around	Q		F						
Men's vault	Q							F	
Men's floor	Q						F		
Men's pommel horse	Q						F		
Men's rings	Q							F	
Men's parallel bars	Q								F
Men's horizontal bar	Q								F
Women's individual all-around		Q				F			
Women's team all-around		Q		F					
Women's vault		Q					F		
Women's uneven bars		Q						F	
Women's balance beam		Q							F
Women's floor		Q							F

Rhythmic (Wembley Arena)
Event↓/Date →	Thu 9	Fri 10	Sat 11	Sun 12
Individual all-around	Q		F	
Group all-around	Q			F

Trampoline (North Greenwich Arena)
Event↓/Date →	Fri 3		Sat 4	
Men	Q	F		
Women			Q	F

== Overall medal table ==
Rank	Nation	Gold	Silver	Bronze	Total
1	China	5	4	3	12
2	Russia	3	5	4	12
3	United States	3	1	2	6
4	Japan	1	2	0	3
5	Romania	1	1	1	3
6	Brazil	1	0	0	1
6	Canada	1	0	0	1
6	Hungary	1	0	0	1
6	Netherlands	1	0	0	1
6	South Korea	1	0	0	1
11	Germany	0	3	0	3
12	Great Britain	0	1	3	4
13	Belarus	0	1	1	2
14	Italy	0	0	2	2
15	France	0	0	1	1
15	Ukraine	0	0	1	1
Totals (16 entries)		18	18	18	54

== Events ==
=== Artistic gymnastics ===
==== Men's events ====
Games	Gold	Silver	Bronze
Team all-around	China; Chen Yibing; Feng Zhe; Guo Weiyang; Zhang Chenglong; Zou Kai	Japan; Ryohei Kato; Kazuhito Tanaka; Yusuke Tanaka; Kōhei Uchimura; Koji Yamamuro	Great Britain; Sam Oldham; Daniel Purvis; Louis Smith; Kristian Thomas; Max Whitlock
Individual all-around	Kōhei Uchimura; Japan	Marcel Nguyen; Germany	Danell Leyva; United States
Floor exercise	Zou Kai; China	Kōhei Uchimura; Japan	Denis Ablyazin; Russia
Pommel horse	Krisztián Berki; Hungary	Louis Smith; Great Britain	Max Whitlock; Great Britain
Rings	Arthur Zanetti; Brazil	Chen Yibing; China	Matteo Morandi; Italy
Vault	Yang Hak-seon; South Korea	Denis Ablyazin; Russia	Igor Radivilov; Ukraine
Parallel bars	Feng Zhe; China	Marcel Nguyen; Germany	Hamilton Sabot; France
Horizontal bar	Epke Zonderland; Netherlands	Fabian Hambüchen; Germany	Zou Kai; China

==== Women's events ====
Games	Gold	Silver	Bronze
Team all-around	United States; Gabby Douglas; Jordyn Wieber; Aly Raisman; Kyla Ross; McKayla Maroney	Russia; Aliya Mustafina; Viktoria Komova; Ksenia Afanasyeva; Anastasia Grishina; Maria Paseka	Romania; Cătălina Ponor; Larisa Iordache; Diana Bulimar; Sandra Izbașa; Diana Chelaru
Individual all-around	Gabby Douglas; United States	Viktoria Komova; Russia	Aliya Mustafina; Russia
Vault	Sandra Izbașa; Romania	McKayla Maroney; United States	Maria Paseka; Russia
Uneven bars	Aliya Mustafina; Russia	He Kexin; China	Elizabeth Tweddle; Great Britain
Balance beam	Deng Linlin; China	Sui Lu; China	Aly Raisman; United States
Floor exercise	Aly Raisman; United States	Cătălina Ponor; Romania	Aliya Mustafina; Russia

=== Rhythmic gymnastics ===
Games	Gold	Silver	Bronze
Group all-around	Russia; Ksenia Dudkina; Alina Makarenko; Uliana Donskova; Anastasia Bliznyuk; Karolina Sevastyanova; Anastasia Nazarenko	Belarus; Maryna Hancharova; Anastasia Ivankova; Nataliya Leshchyk; Aliaksandra Narkevich; Ksenia Sankovich; Alina Tumilovich	Italy; Elisa Blanchi; Romina Laurito; Marta Pagnini; Elisa Santoni; Anzhelika Savrayuk; Andreea Stefanescu
Individual all-around	Yevgeniya Kanayeva; Russia	Daria Dmitrieva; Russia	Liubov Charkashyna; Belarus

=== Trampoline ===
Games	Gold	Silver	Bronze
Men's individual	Dong Dong; China	Dmitry Ushakov; Russia	Lu Chunlong; China
Women's individual	Rosannagh MacLennan; Canada	Huang Shanshan; China	He Wenna; China

== Judging controversies ==
The men's artistic team all-around final became the subject of controversy when the judges were booed by the crowd following Japan's Kōhei Uchimura's score for his pommel horse routine, and how it shuffled the medals of Japan, Great Britain, and Ukraine.
