= Irina Leparskaya =

Belarusian rhythmic gymnastics coach

Irina Yuryevna Leparskaya
- Born: July 27, 1957 (age 69); Novorossiysk, Russian SSR, Soviet Union
- Occupation: Head coach of the Belarusian Rhythmic Gymnastics
- Known for: Trainer of Rhythmic Gymnastics in Minsk Dynamo Club and coach of multiple Olympic/World medalists
- Spouse: Alexander Leparsky

Irina Yuryevna Leparskaya (Belarusian: Ірына Юреўна Лепарская, Russian: Ирина Юрьевна Лепарская, born July 27, 1957, in Novorossiysk, Russian SSR, Soviet Union) is a rhythmic gymnastics trainer who was the Head coach of the Belarusian Rhythmic Gymnastics from 1999 to 2026.

== Career ==
Irina was born in Novorossiysk, Krasnodar Krai, Russia. She graduated from the Belarusian State Order of the Red Banner Institute of Physical Education (1979). Since 1981, Leparskaya has worked as a coach in the sports club "Dynamo Minsk".

Leparskaya is an Honored Worker of Physical Culture of Belarus and Honoured Master of Sports of Belarus (since 1988).

=== Coaching history and notable students ===
Leparskaya has trained many Belarusian Olympic/World/European/World Cup medalists notably:

- Marina Lobatch (born in 1970) – the 1988 all-around Olympic champion and the first Soviet/only Belarusian to win the Olympic Games in rhythmic gymnastics.
- Yulia Raskina (born in 1982) – the 2000 Olympic all-around silver medalist, 1999 World silver medalist and two-time (1999, 2000) European all-around silver medalist.
- Inna Zhukova (born in 1986) – the 2008 Olympic all-around silver medalist and 2006 Grand Prix Final bronze medalist.
- Liubov Charkashyna (born in 1987) – the 2012 Olympics all-around bronze medalist, two-time World Cup Final all-around bronze medalist, 2011 European ball and clubs gold medalist.
- Melitina Staniouta (born in 1993) – three-time (2015, 2013, 2010) World all-around bronze medalist and three time World Cup Final all-around medalist.
- Alina Tumilovich – two-time Olympic Group medalist (bronze in 2008 and silver in 2012).
- Ksenia Sankovich – two-time Olympic Group medalist (bronze in 2008 and silver in 2012).
- Aliaksandra Narkevich – Olympic and World Group medalist
- Larissa Lukyanenko (born in 1973) – three-time (1992, 1994, 1995) World all-around medalist and 1993 European all-around silver medalist.
- Tatiana Ogrizko (born in 1976) – the 1997 European all-around silver medalist and 1996 Grand Prix Final all-around bronze medalist.
- Katsiaryna Halkina (born in 1997) – the 2018 European all-around bronze medalist
- Evgenia Pavlina (born in 1978) – the 1998 European all-around silver medalist, 1998 European ribbon champion
- Valeria Vatkina (born in 1981) – 1997 Grand Prix Final all-around silver medalist and two-time World team silver medalist.
- Olga Gontar (born in 1979) – 1995 Grand Prix Final all-around bronze medalist.
- Elena Tkachenko (born in 1983) – multiple World / European medalist.
- Elena Bolotina (born in 1997) – 2015 Grand Prix Final all-around bronze medalist.
- Maria Kadobina – World Group bronze medalist
- Arina Charopa (born in 1995) – the 2010 Youth Olympic Games silver medalist
- Hanna Bazhko – World Team medalist
- Svetlana Rudalova (born in 1984) – World Team medalist
- Alina Harnasko – 2020+1 Olympic individual all-around bronze medalist, 2020 European all-around silver medalist.
- Anastasiia Salos – 2020 European all-around bronze medalist.
- Mariya Trubach – 2014 Youth Olympic Games all-around silver medalist
