= Hanna Bazhko =

Belarusian rhythmic gymnast

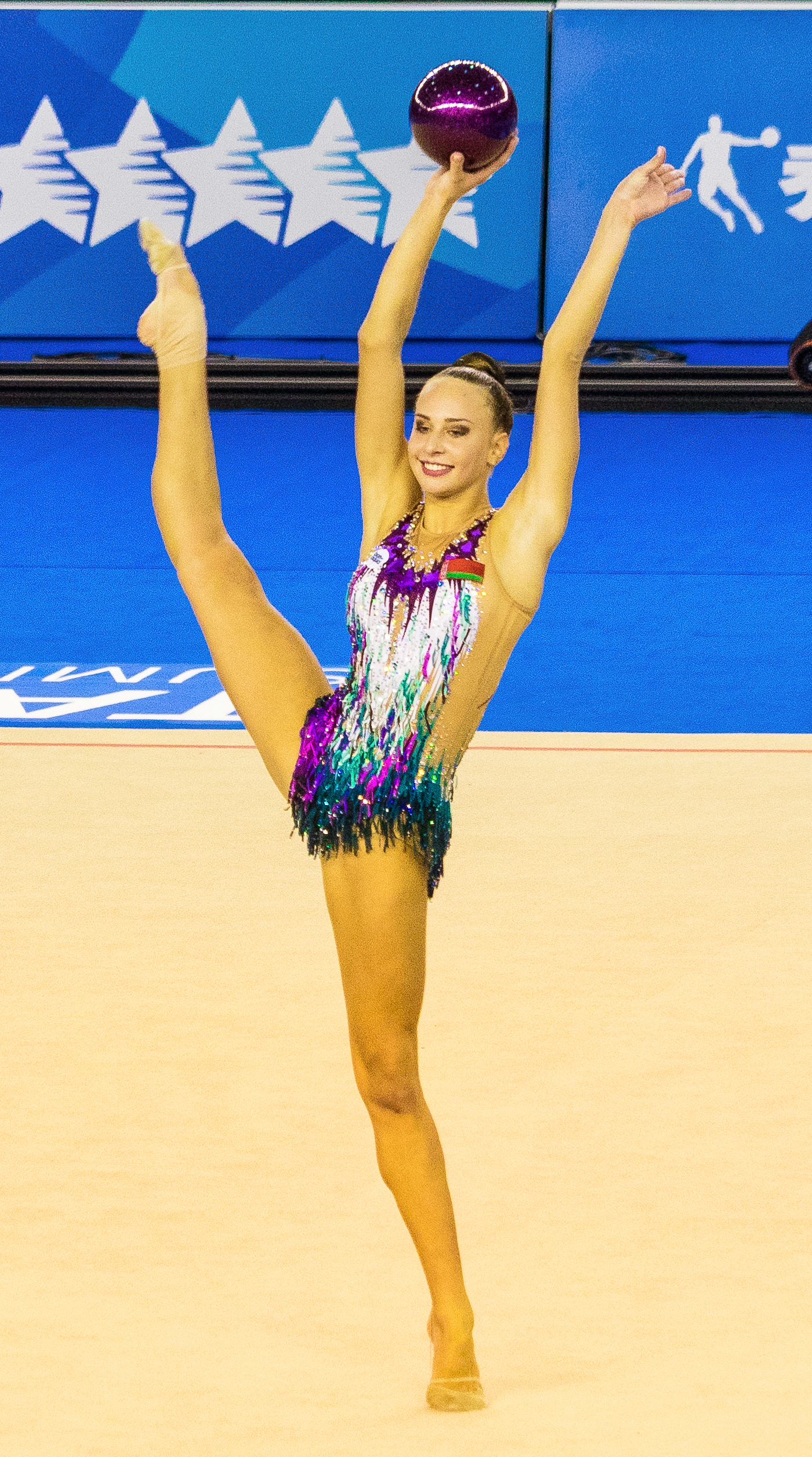
- Bazhko at the 2017 Summer Universiade

Personal information
- Alternative name: Anna Bozhko
- Nickname: Anya
- Born: July 25, 1998 (age 28) Minsk, Belarus

Gymnastics career
- Discipline: Rhythmic gymnastics
- Country represented: Belarus
- Club: Dinamo Minsk
- Head coach: Irina Leparskaya
- World ranking: 21 (2016 Season); 27 (2015 Season)
Medal record
Representing Belarus
Rhythmic Gymnastics
World Championships
Silver medal – second place	2015 Stuttgart	Team
Summer Universiade
Bronze medal – third place	2017 Taipei	All-around

Hanna Vyachaslavauna Bazhko (Belarusian: Ханна Вячаславаўна Бажко; Russian: Анна Вячеславовна Божко, born July 25, 1998, in Minsk, Belarus) is a Belarusian individual rhythmic gymnast.

== Career ==
=== Junior ===
Bazhko began competing in international junior tournaments as early as in 2008. She competed in junior division at the 2011 Miss Valentine Cup. In 2013, Bazhko won the all-around gold at the Lobach International Tournament in Minsk. She won the team silver medal with Mariya Trubach at the 2013 Lisboa Junior World Cup and at the 2013 Holon Grand Prix, Bazhko won the all-around silver behind Russia's Yulia Bravikova. On October 25–27, Bazhko competed at the World Club Championship, the 2013 Aeon Cup in Tokyo, Japan, representing team Belarus (together with Senior teammates Melitina Staniouta and Katsiaryna Halkina) where they won the Team silver medal.

=== Senior ===
In 2014 Season, Bazhko debuted in seniors competitions. She finished 7th in all-around at the 2014 Grand Prix Brno. At the 2014 Grand Prix Berlin Masters she finished 4th in all-around and won bronze medals in clubs, ribbon finals.

In 2015 Season, Bazhko at the 2015 Lisboa World Cup finishing 15th in all-around and qualified to hoop finals finishing in 5th place. She finished 16th in all-around at the 2015 Bucharest World Cup. At the senior international tournament of Holon, Bazhko won the all-around silver behind Russian Ekaterina Selezneva. In August, Bazhko finished 11th in the all-around at the MTK Cup in Budapest and won the all-around gold at the 2015 Yoldyz Cup in Kazan, ahead of Ekaterina Selezneva and Linoy Ashram. On September 9–13, Bazhko (together with teammates Melitina Staniouta, Katsiaryna Halkina and Arina Charopa) competed at the 2015 World Championships in Stuttgart, with Team Belarus winning the silver.

In 2016, Bazhko started her season competing at the 2016 Miss Valentine Cup where she won a silver in clubs. On March 17–20, Bazhko then competed at the 2016 Lisboa World Cup where she finished 16th in the all-around. On May 13–15, Bazhko competed at the 2016 Tashkent World Cup finishing 13th in the all-around (tied with teammate Elena Bolotina). On May 27–29, Bazhko finished 9th in the all-around at the 2016 Sofia World Cup with a total of 69.400 points. On September 9–11, Bazhko together with teammates Katsiaryna Halkina and junior Alina Harnasko represented team Dinamo at the annual 2016 Aeon Cup in Tokyo, where they won the team silver and with Bazhko finishing 7th in the all-around. In 2017 On August 27–29, Bazhko competed at the 2017 Summer Universiade where she finished won bronze in the all-around behind Russia's Ekaterina Selezneva, she qualified in 3 apparatus finals finishing 6th in ribbon, 7th in ball and 8th in clubs.
