= 2012 Rhythmic Gymnastics European Championships =

- Location: Nizhny Novgorod, Russia
- Start date: 29 May 2012
- End date: 3 June 2012

The 28th Rhythmic Gymnastics European Championships was held in Nizhny Novgorod, Russia from May 29 to June 3, 2012.

== Medal winners ==
Event	Gold	Silver	Bronze
Senior Individual Finals
All-around	Evgenia Kanaeva; Russia	Alexandra Merkulova; Russia	Aliya Garayeva; Azerbaijan
Senior Groups Finals
All-around	Russia; Anastasia Bliznyuk; Uliana Donskova; Ksenia Dudkina; Olga Ilina; Alina Makarenko; Karolina Sevastyanova	Belarus; Maryna Hancharova; Anastasiya Ivankova; Nataliya Leshchyk; Aliaksandra Narkevich; Kseniya Sankovich; Alina Tumilovich	Italy; Elisa Blanchi; Romina Laurito; Marta Pagnini; Elisa Santoni; Anzhelika Savrayuk; Andreea Stefanescu
5 balls	Russia; Anastasia Bliznyuk; Uliana Donskova; Ksenia Dudkina; Olga Ilina; Alina Makarenko; Karolina Sevastyanova	Belarus; Maryna Hancharova; Anastasiya Ivankova; Nataliya Leshchyk; Aliaksandra Narkevich; Kseniya Sankovich; Alina Tumilovich	Bulgaria; Reneta Kamberova; Mihaela Maevska; Tsvetelina Naydenova; Elena Todorova; Hristiana Todorova; Katrin Velkova
3 ribbons + 2 hoops	Belarus; Maryna Hancharova; Anastasiya Ivankova; Nataliya Leshchyk; Aliaksandra Narkevich; Kseniya Sankovich; Alina Tumilovich	Bulgaria; Reneta Kamberova; Mihaela Maevska; Tsvetelina Naydenova; Elena Todorova; Hristiana Todorova; Katrin Velkova	Italy; Elisa Blanchi; Romina Laurito; Marta Pagnini; Elisa Santoni; Anzhelika Savrayuk; Andreea Stefanescu
Junior Finals
Team	Russia; Diana Borisova; Yana Kudryavtseva; Julia Sinitsyna; Aleksandra Soldatova	Belarus; Elena Bolotina; Katsiaryna Halkina; Maria Kadobina	Georgia; Gabriela Khvedelidze; Salome Phajava; Sophio Pharulava
Hoop	Diana Borisova; Russia	Elena Bolotina; Belarus	Nilufar Niftaliyeva; Azerbaijan
Ball	Yana Kudryavtseva; Russia	Katsiaryna Halkina; Belarus	Anastasiia Mulmina; Ukraine
Clubs	Julia Sinitsyna; Russia	Maria Kadobina; Belarus	Gabriela Khvedelidze; Georgia
Ribbon	Aleksandra Soldatova; Russia	Katsiaryna Halkina; Belarus	Gulsum Shafizada; Azerbaijan

== Results ==
=== Seniors ===
==== Individual all-around ====
Rank	Gymnast	Nation	Hoop (rhythmic gymnastics)	Ball (rhythmic gymnastics)	Clubs (rhythmic gymnastics)	Ribbon (rhythmic gymnastics)	Total
1st place, gold medalist(s)	Evgenia Kanaeva	Russia	29.500	29.700	29.400	29.550	118.150
2nd place, silver medalist(s)	Alexandra Merkulova	Russia	29.050	28.850	29.200	29.325	116.425
3rd place, bronze medalist(s)	Aliya Garayeva	Azerbaijan	28.850	28.950	28.400	28.650	114.850
4	Liubov Charkashyna	Belarus	28.500	27.250	28.350	28.600	112.700
5	Silviya Miteva	Bulgaria	27.350	28.550	27.950	28.400	112.250
6	Melitina Staniouta	Belarus	27.950	28.250	28.050	27.650	111.900
7	Joanna Mitrosz	Poland	27.850	27.700	27.750	27.750	111.000
8	Ganna Rizatdinova	Ukraine	27.850	27.725	27.725	27.625	110.925
9	Neta Rivkin	Israel	28.525	28.275	27.050	26.525	110.325
10	Delphine Ledoux	France	27.450	27.250	27.150	27.700	109.550
11	Caroline Weber	Austria	27.200	27.300	27.350	27.450	109.300
12	Chrystalleni Trikomiti	Cyprus	26.450	26.950	26.900	27.150	107.450
13	Varvara Filiou	Greece	26.600	26.850	26.500	26.650	106.600
14	Julieta Cantaluppi	Italy	26.450	25.950	26.500	26.650	105.550
15	Laura Jung	Germany	26.375	26.575	26.550	26.000	105.500
16	Carolina Rodriguez	Spain	26.350	26.400	26.150	26.550	105.450
17	Dora Vass	Hungary	26.200	26.300	26.050	26.450	105.000
18	Alexandra Piscupescu	Romania	25.950	26.650	26.450	25.950	105.000
19	Viktoria Shynkarenko	Ukraine	24.300	26.325	26.650	26.000	103.275

==== Group all-around ====
Rank	Nation	Ball (rhythmic gymnastics)	Ribbon (rhythmic gymnastics) Hoop (rhythmic gymnastics)	Total
1st place, gold medalist(s)	Russia	28.450	28.450	56.900
2nd place, silver medalist(s)	Belarus	28.300	28.025	56.325
3rd place, bronze medalist(s)	Italy	27.550	27.325	54.875
4	Bulgaria	27.800	26.875	54.675
5	Spain	27.325	27.150	54.475
6	Israel	27.275	27.000	54.275
7	France	26.150	26.075	52.225
8	Greece	26.750	26.425	52.175
9	Germany	26.400	26.350	51.750
10	Ukraine	27.100	24.650	51.750
11	Poland	24.625	24.900	49.525
12	Azerbaijan	24.075	24.200	48.275
13	Slovakia	24.150	23.000	47.150
14	Czech Republic	23.125	23.150	46.275
15	Austria	23.500	22.750	46.250
16	Great Britain	22.325	21.825	44.150
17	Lithuania	20.600	21.650	42.250

==== Group 5 balls ====
Rank	Nation	D Score	A Score	E Score	Pen.	Total
1st place, gold medalist(s)	Russia	9.650	9.750	9.400		28.800
2nd place, silver medalist(s)	Belarus	9.300	9.500	9.250		28.050
3rd place, bronze medalist(s)	Bulgaria	9.400	9.450	9.150		28.000
4	Italy	8.850	9.550	9.100		27.500
5	Spain	8.950	9.350	9.100		27.400
6	Israel	8.850	9.200	9.000		27.050
7	Ukraine	8.600	9.200	8.900		26.700
8	Greece	8.450	9.150	8.600		26.200

==== Group 3 ribbons + 2 hoops ====
Rank	Nation	D Score	A Score	E Score	Pen.	Total
1st place, gold medalist(s)	Belarus	9.300	9.500	9.200		28.000
2nd place, silver medalist(s)	Bulgaria	9.100	9.400	9.000		27.500
3rd place, bronze medalist(s)	Italy	8.750	9.400	9.050		27.200
4	Russia	8.975	9.400	8.800		27.175
5	Israel	8.925	9.100	8.700		26.725
6	Greece	8.550	9.100	8.650		26.300
7	Spain	8.750	8.950	8.650	0.50	25.850
8	France	8.400	8.950	8.450		25.800

=== Juniors ===
==== Team ====
Rank	Nation	Hoop (rhythmic gymnastics)	Ball (rhythmic gymnastics)	Clubs (rhythmic gymnastics)	Ribbon (rhythmic gymnastics)	Total
1st place, gold medalist(s)	Russia	27.400	27.450	27.450	27.550	109.850
2nd place, silver medalist(s)	Belarus	26.700	26.750	26.450	26.650	106.550
3rd place, bronze medalist(s)	Georgia	26.225	26.000	26.000	26.100	104.325
4	Ukraine	25.125	26.200	26.175	25.825	103.325
5	Azerbaijan	25.850	26.300	24.750	26.025	102.925
6	Bulgaria	25.275	25.550	25.175	25.675	101.675
7	Israel	25.100	24.875	25.375	25.650	101.000
8	Italy	25.800	24.400	25.450	24.550	100.200
9	Estonia	23.700	25.425	23.650	25.750	98.525
10	Moldova	23.750	25.000	24.400	24.775	97.925
11	Germany	24.900	24.175	24.250	24.400	97.725
12	Cyprus	23.250	24.500	24.700	23.650	96.100
13	Hungary	23.800	23.850	24.250	24.150	96.050
14	Slovenia	24.150	23.700	24.275	23.725	95.850
15	Spain	23.100	24.475	24.450	23.800	95.825
16	France	23.950	23.600	24.125	24.050	95.725
17	Greece	24.050	24.050	23.575	24.000	95.675
18	Czech Republic	23.600	24.950	23.675	22.750	94.975
19	Belgium	23.000	24.150	23.800	23.750	94.700
20	Finland	24.650	22.650	24.550	22.600	94.450
21	Latvia	23.300	23.050	23.650	24.275	94.275
22	Poland	22.400	23.650	23.900	23.925	93.875
23	Turkey	23.300	23.850	23.525	23.150	93.825
24	Romania	23.150	24.450	22.600	22.850	93.050
25	Portugal	23.550	22.225	22.500	23.700	92.975
26	Austria	23.550	23.300	21.600	24.050	92.500
27	Lithuania	22.800	23.350	22.950	23.375	92.475
28	Switzerland	22.450	21.575	23.375	23.400	90.800
29	Norway	22.700	22.125	22.550	23.150	90.525
30	Croatia	22.750	21.350	22.725	22.600	89.425
31	Great Britain	22.550	23.625	22.400	20.500	89.075
32	Slovakia	21.100	22.375	23.000	22.250	88.725
33	Armenia	22.900	19.300	21.150	22.600	85.950
34	Sweden	19.125	21.650	21.650	21.100	83.525

==== Hoop ====
Rank	Gymnast	Nation	D Score	A Score	E Score	Pen.	Total
1st place, gold medalist(s)	Diana Borisova	Russia	8.250	9.600	9.600		27.450
2nd place, silver medalist(s)	Elena Bolotina	Belarus	8.025	9.400	9.400		26.825
3rd place, bronze medalist(s)	Nilufar Niftaliyeva	Azerbaijan	8.000	9.300	9.300		26.600
4	Gabriela Khvedelidze	Georgia	7.950	9.150	9.200		26.300
5	Zhenina Trashlieva	Bulgaria	7.850	9.050	9.050		25.950
6	Eleonora Romanova	Ukraine	7.450	9.200	9.300		25.950
7	Maria Carmen Crescenzi	Italy	7.600	9.050	9.100		25.750
8	Ekaterina Levina	Israel	6.550	8.850	8.000	0.40	25.500

==== Ball ====
Rank	Gymnast	Nation	D Score	A Score	E Score	Pen.	Total
1st place, gold medalist(s)	Yana Kudryavtseva	Russia	8.400	9.700	9.700		27.800
2nd place, silver medalist(s)	Katsiaryna Halkina	Belarus	8.050	9.350	9.200		26.600
3rd place, bronze medalist(s)	Anastasiia Mulmina	Ukraine	7.600	9.400	9.400		26.400
4	Karina Jerogina	Estonia	7.925	9.100	9.200		26.225
5	Sophio Pharulava	Georgia	7.800	9.200	9.200		26.200
6	Zhenina Trashlieva	Bulgaria	7.850	9.150	9.100		26.100
7	Marina Durunda	Azerbaijan	7.650	9.250	9.100		26.000
8	Nicoleta Dulgheru	Moldova	7.550	9.050	9.050		25.650

==== Clubs ====
Rank	Gymnast	Nation	D Score	A Score	E Score	Pen.	Total
1st place, gold medalist(s)	Julia Sinitsyna	Russia	8.150	9.700	9.600		27.450
2nd place, silver medalist(s)	Maria Kadobina	Belarus	7.750	9.450	9.275		26.475
3rd place, bronze medalist(s)	Gabriela Khvedelidze	Georgia	7.625	9.250	9.200		26.075
4	Radina Filipova	Bulgaria	7.725	9.200	9.100		26.025
5	Maria Carmen Crescenzi	Italy	7.650	9.100	9.100		25.850
6	Anastasia Mulmina	Ukraine	7.300	9.100	8.900		25.300
7	Nilufar Niftaliyeva	Azerbaijan	7.350	9.150	8.900	0.20	25.200
8	Alona Koshevatskiy	Israel	6.950	9.000	8.600		24.550

==== Ribbon ====
Rank	Gymnast	Nation	D Score	A Score	E Score	Pen.	Total
1st place, gold medalist(s)	Aleksandra Soldatova	Russia	8.150	9.750	9.600		27.500
2nd place, silver medalist(s)	Katsiaryna Halkina	Belarus	7.950	9.425	9.400		26.775
3rd place, bronze medalist(s)	Gulsum Shafizada	Azerbaijan	7.825	9.200	9.300		26.325
4	Karina Jerogina	Estonia	7.700	9.100	9.150		25.950
5	Simona Ivanova	Bulgaria	7.500	9.300	9.100		25.900
6	Salome Phajava	Georgia	7.550	9.200	9.100		25.850
7	Alona Koshevatskiy	Israel	7.425	9.200	9.050		25.675
8	Eleonora Romanova	Ukraine	6.775	9.050	8.900		24.725

== Medal count ==
=== Seniors ===
Rank	Nation	Gold	Silver	Bronze	Total
1	Russia	3	1	0	4
2	Belarus	1	2	0	3
3	Bulgaria	0	1	1	2
4	Italy	0	0	2	2
5	Azerbaijan	0	0	1	1
Totals (5 entries)		4	4	4	12

=== Juniors ===
Rank	Nation	Gold	Silver	Bronze	Total
1	Russia	5	0	0	5
2	Belarus	0	5	0	5
3	Azerbaijan	0	0	2	2
3	Georgia	0	0	2	2
5	Ukraine	0	0	1	1
Totals (5 entries)		5	5	5	15
