= Elena Bolotina =

Belarusian rhythmic gymnast

- Alternative name: Alena Bolotina
- Nickname: Lena
- Born: 23 September 1997 (age 28) Minsk, Belarus

Gymnastics career
- Discipline: Rhythmic gymnastics
- Country represented: Belarus
- Head coach: Irina Leparskaya
- Retired: 2017
- World ranking: 37 (2016 Season)
Medal record
Representing Belarus
Rhythmic Gymnastics
Junior European Championships
Silver medal – second place	2012 Nizhy Novgorod	Hoop
Silver medal – second place	2012 Nizhy Novgorod	Team
Grand Prix Final
Bronze medal – third place	2015 Brno	All-around
Bronze medal – third place	2015 Brno	Clubs
Bronze medal – third place	2015 Brno	Ribbon

Elena Bolotina (Belarusian: Алена Балоціна; Russian: Елена Болотина, born 23 September 1997 in Minsk, Belarus) is a Belarusian individual rhythmic gymnast. She is the 2015 Grand Prix Final all-around bronze medalist and the 2012 European Junior Hoop silver medalist.

== Career ==
=== Junior ===
Bolotina began appearing in international competitions in 2008 competing at the Brussel Cup. She has wom numerous medals at the international tournaments and has competed in the Junior World Cup and Junior Grand Prix series. She competed at the 2010 Minsk World Cup, in 2011 at the Holon Junior Grand Prix and the World Cup in Minsk and Tashkent. She was member of the Belarusian Team (together with teammates Katsiaryna Halkina and Maria Kadobina that competed at the 2012 European Junior Championships where Team Belarus won the Team silver medal, she won another silver hoop final.

=== Senior ===
In 2013 season, Kadobina debuted as a senior. In 2014, Bolotina started her season competing at 2014 Valentine Cup where she qualified in Clubs finals finishing in 8th position. She then competed at the 2014 Baltic Hoop, she finished 5th in the all-around behind Uzbekistan's Valeriya Davidova, she qualified to all 4 apparatus finals and won a bronze medal in ball. She competed at the 2014 Tashkent World Cup finishing 17th in the all-around and at the 2014 Minsk World Cup. Bolotina competed at the 2014 Grand Prix Final finishing 7th in the all-around behind Ukrainian Eleonora Romanova. She qualified to 3 apparatus finals, placing 7th in hoop, ribbon and 8th in clubs.

In 2015 season, Bolotina competed at the 2015 Valentine Cup finishing 11th in the all-around finals. Her next competition was at the International Tournament of Pesaro. At Corbeil-Essonnes Tournament in France, Bolotina finished 6th in all-around behind American Jasmine Kerber and qualified to all 4 apparatus finals. She then competed at the MTK Cup in Budapest where she finished 8th in the all-around and the Yoldyz Cup in Kazan, she finished 13th in the all-around. On 16–18 October Bolotina made a breakthrough winning the all-around bronze at the 2015 Grand Prix Final with a total of 68.800 edging out Uzbek Anastasiya Serdyukova. She qualified to 4 apparatus finals and took 2 bronze medals in (clubs and hoop).

In 2016, Bolotina started her season at the 2016 Valentine Cup in Tartu, Estonia where she won a bronze in ball. On 17–20 March Bolitina competed at the 2016 Lisboa World Cup where she finished 18th in the all-around. She also competed at the 2016 Baltic Hoop and won the all-around bronze medal behind Israeli's Victoria Veinberg Filanovsky. On 6–8 May Bolotina won the all-around bronze behind Marina Durunda at the 2016 Corbeil-Essonnes International Tournament. On 13–15 May Bolotina competed at the 2016 Tashkent World Cup finishing 9th in the all-around. Bolotina then finished 18th in the all-around at the 2016 Sofia World Cup.

In 2017 Bolotina announced her retirement before the start of the early season.
