= Anastasia Ivankova =

Belarusian rhythmic gymnast (born 1991)

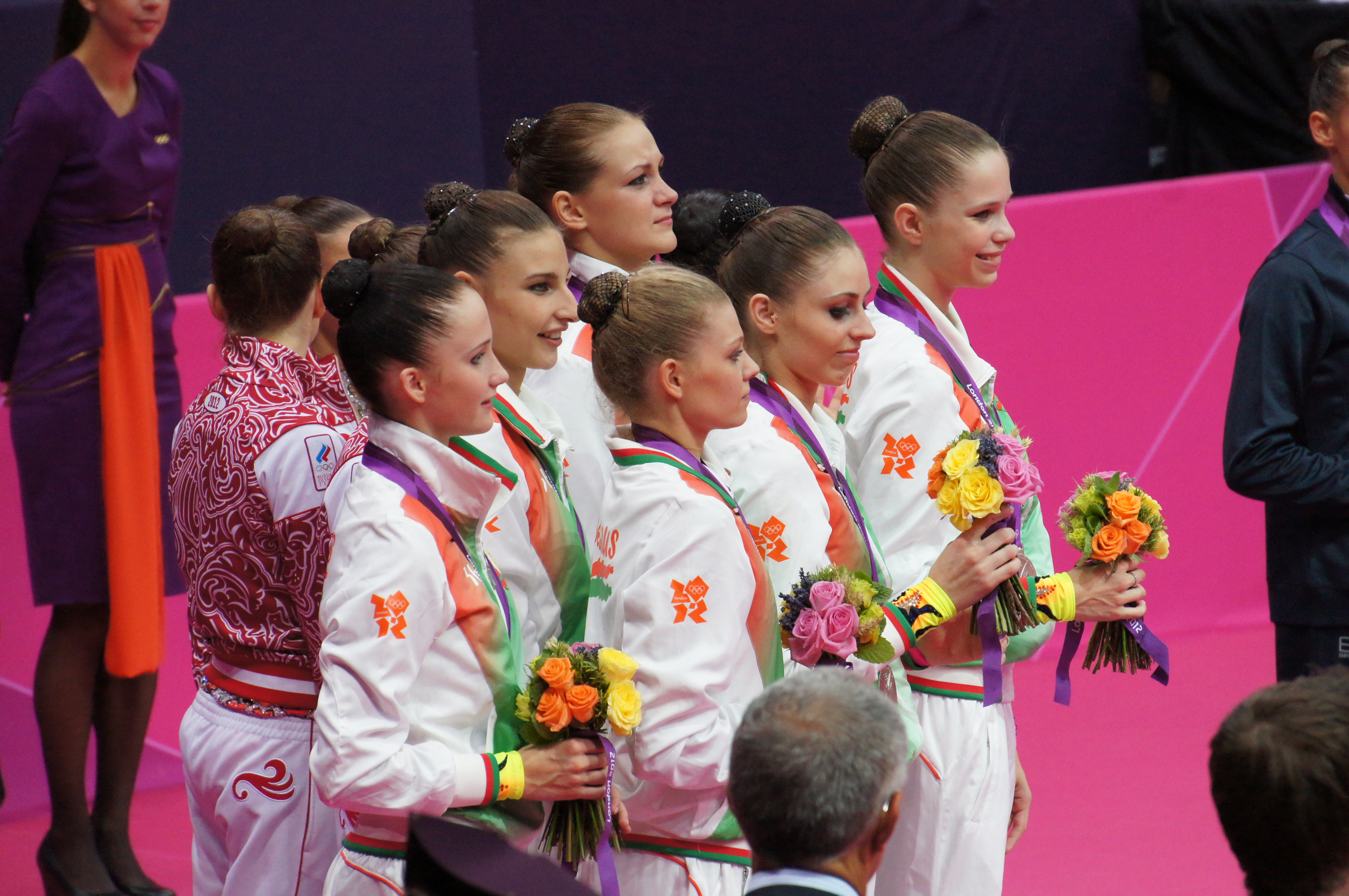
- Belarusian group at the 2012 Summer Olympics group all-around medal ceremony

Personal information
- Born: 22 November 1991 (age 34) Minsk, Belarus

Gymnastics career
- Discipline: Rhythmic gymnastics
- Country represented: Belarus
Medal record
Representing Belarus
Olympic Games
Silver medal – second place	2012 London	Group all-around
Bronze medal – third place	2008 Beijing	Group all-around
World Championships
Silver medal – second place	2009 Mie	Group all-around
Silver medal – second place	2009 Mie	3 ribbons/2 ropes
Silver medal – second place	2010 Moscow	Group all-around
Bronze medal – third place	2009 Mie	5 hoops
Bronze medal – third place	2010 Moscow	3 ribbons/2 ropes
European Championships
Gold medal – first place	2012 Nizhny Novgorod	3 ribbons/2 hoops
Silver medal – second place	2008 Torino	Group all-around
Silver medal – second place	2008 Torino	5 ropes
Silver medal – second place	2010 Bremen	5 hoops
Silver medal – second place	2012 Nizhny Novgorod	Group all-around
Silver medal – second place	2012 Nizhny Novgorod	5 Balls
Bronze medal – third place	2008 Torino	3 hoops/4 clubs
Bronze medal – third place	2010 Bremen	Group all-around
Bronze medal – third place	2010 Bremen	3 ribbons/2 ropes
Junior European Championships
Silver medal – second place	2006 Moscow	Team
Silver medal – second place	2006 Moscow	Rope

Anastasia Ivankova (Belarusian: Настасся Уладзіміраўна Іванькова, Łacinka: Nastassia Uładzimiraŭna Ivankova, born 22 November 1991) is a Belarusian rhythmic gymnast. She is a two-time Olympic medalist in the group all-around competition.

== Gymnastics career ==
Ivankova won a bronze medal in the group all-around competition at the 2008 Summer Olympics in Beijing. At the 2009 World Championships, she won silver medals in group all-around and 3 ribbons & 2 ropes, and bronze in 5 hoops. They repeated as the group all-around silver medalists at the 2010 World Championships.

At the 2012 European Championships, Ivankova was a member of the group that won the all-around silver medal and gold in 3 ribbons/2 hoops. At the 2012 Summer Olympics in London, she won silver in the group all-around event together with group members Maryna Hancharova, Alina Tumilovich, Nataliya Leshchyk, Aliaksandra Narkevich, and Kseniya Sankovich.

== Post-gymnastics career ==
Following her retirement from the sport, Ivankova moved to the United States and is a coach at Burlo Gymnastics in Chatsworth, Los Angeles, California.

== Detailed Olympic results ==
Year	Competition Description	Location	Music	Apparatus	Rank	Score-Final	Rank	Score-Qualifying
2012	Olympics	London		All-around	2nd	55.500	3rd	54.750
2012	Olympics	London	Allegro Non Molto (Winter) by Antonio Vivaldi	5 Balls	4th	27.825	3rd	27.900
2012	Olympics	London	24 Caprices, Op. 1: Caprice No. 24 in A Minor, Op. 1, No. 24 by Ilya Kaler	3 Ribbons + 2 Hoops	2nd	27.675	6th	26.850
