= Nataliya Leshchyk =

Belarusian rhythmic gymnast (born 1995)

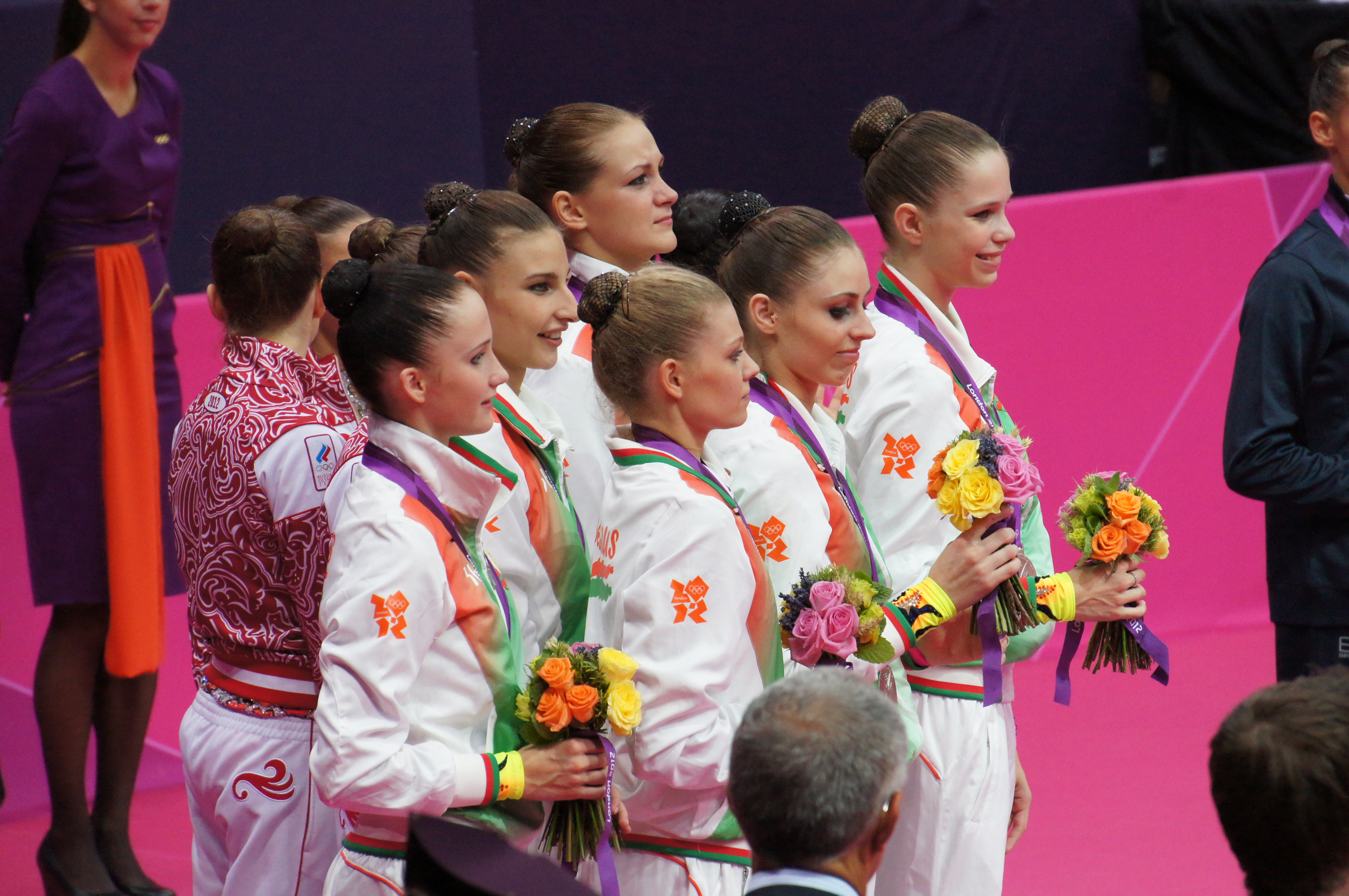
- Belarusian group all-around medalists at the 2012 Summer Olympics

Personal information
- Born: 25 July 1995 (age 31)

Gymnastics career
- Discipline: Rhythmic gymnastics
- Country represented: Belarus
Medal record
Representing Belarus
Olympic Games
Silver medal – second place	2012 London	Group all-around
European Championships
Gold medal – first place	2012 Nizhny Novgorod	3 ribbons/2 hoops
Silver medal – second place	2012 Nizhny Novgorod	Group all-around
Junior European Championships
Silver medal – second place	2010 Bremen	Team
Silver medal – second place	2010 Bremen	Hoop

Nataliya Leshchyk (Belarusian: Наталія Валер'еўна Лешчык; Łacinka: Nataliya Leščyk; born 25 July 1995) is a Belarusian rhythmic gymnast who competed in group events. She is the 2012 Olympic all-around silver medalist with group members Anastasiya Ivankova, Alina Tumilovich, Maryna Hancharova, Aliaksandra Narkevich, and Kseniya Sankovich. At the 2012 European Championships, she won gold in 3 ribbons/2 hoops and silver in group all-around.

== Detailed Olympic results ==
Year	Competition Description	Location	Music	Apparatus	Rank	Score-Final	Rank	Score-Qualifying
2012	Olympics	London		All-around	2nd	55.500	3rd	54.750
2012	Olympics	London	Allegro Non Molto (Winter) by Antonio Vivaldi	5 Balls	4th	27.825	3rd	27.900
2012	Olympics	London	24 Caprices, Op. 1: Caprice No. 24 in A Minor, Op. 1, No. 24 by Ilya Kaler	3 Ribbons + 2 Hoops	2nd	27.675	6th	26.850
