= Aliaksandra Narkevich =

Belarusian rhythmic gymnast (born 1994)

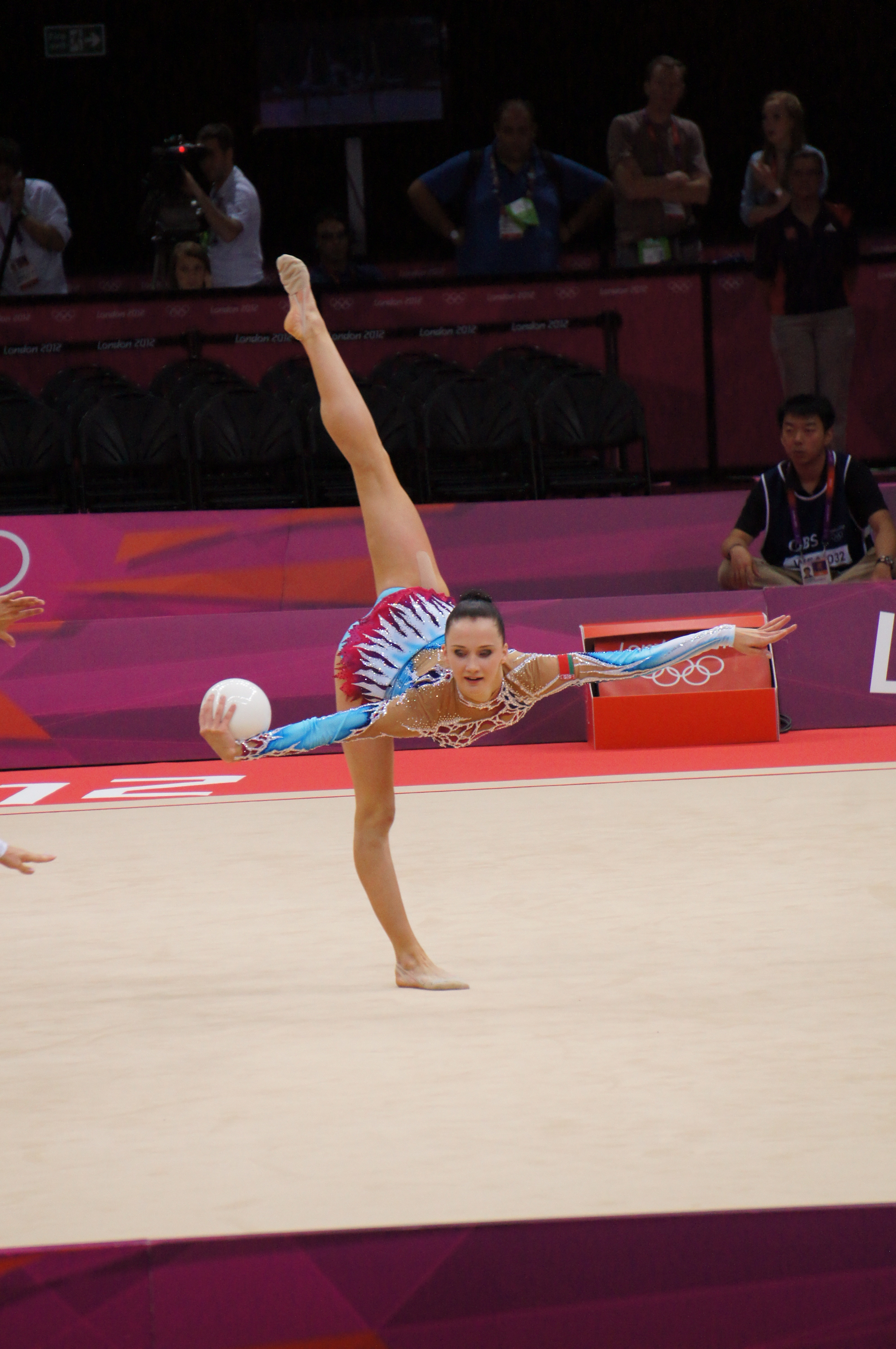
- Narkevich at the 2012 Olympics

Personal information
- Born: 22 December 1994 (age 31) Minsk, Belarus
- Height: 172 cm (5 ft 8 in)

Gymnastics career
- Discipline: Rhythmic gymnastics
- Country represented: Belarus
- Head coach: Irina Leparskaya
- Retired: 2015
Medal record
Representing Belarus
Olympic Games
Silver medal – second place	2012 London	Group all-around
World Championships
Gold medal – first place	2013 Kyiv	Group all-around
Silver medal – second place	2010 Moscow	Team
Silver medal – second place	2011 Montpellier	Team
Silver medal – second place	2013 Kyiv	3 balls/2 ribbons
European Games
Bronze medal – third place	2015 Baku	Group all-around
European Championships
Gold medal – first place	2012 N. Novgorod	3 ribbons/2 hoops
Silver medal – second place	2012 N. Novgorod	Group all-around
Junior European Championships
Gold medal – first place	2008 Torino	Hoop
Silver medal – second place	2008 Torino	Team

Aliaksandra Narkevich (Belarusian: Аляксандра Сяргееўна Наркевіч; Łacinka: Aliaksandra Siarhiejeŭna Narkievič; Russian: Александра Сергеевна Наркевич; born 22 December 1994) is a Belarusian former rhythmic gymnast who competed mainly in group events. She is the 2012 Olympic group all-around silver medalist with group members Anastasiya Ivankova, Alina Tumilovich, Maryna Hancharova, Nataliya Leshchyk, and Kseniya Sankovich.

== Career ==
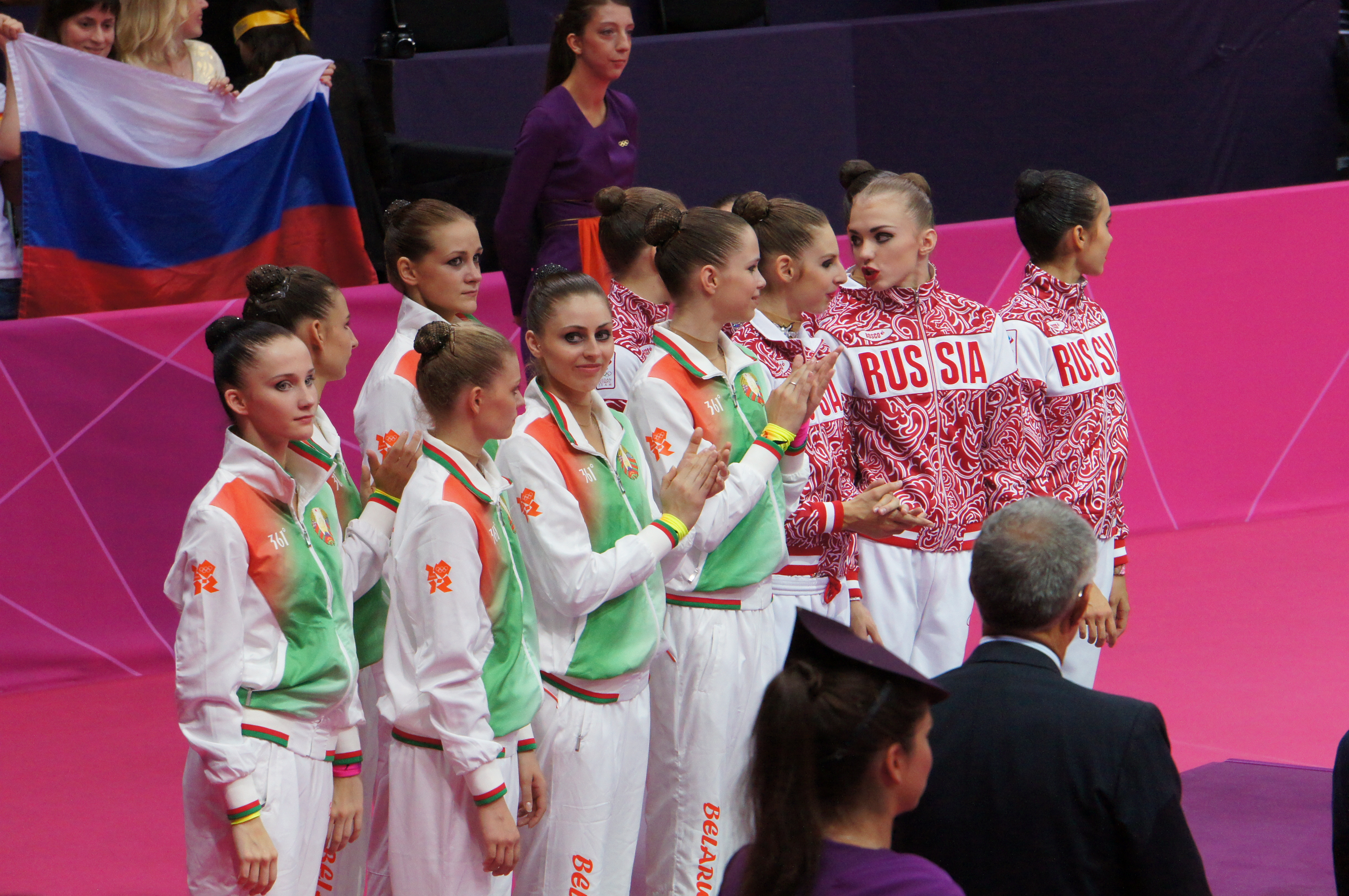
Narkevich with the Belarusian group all-around medalists at the 2012 Summer Olympics

At the 2008 European Junior Championships, Narkevich won gold in the hoop final and the team silver medal. She competed as an individual gymnast at the 2011 World Championships but switched to competing with the Belarusian group in 2012.

Narkevich won the silver medal at the 2012 European Championships in group all-around. She then won a silver medal at the 2012 Summer Olympics in the group all-around event together with group members Anastasiya Ivankova, Alina Tumilovich, Nataliya Leshchyk, Maryna Hancharova, and Kseniya Sankovich.

At the 2013 World Championships in Kyiv, Narkevich won gold in group all-around and silver in 3 balls / 2 ribbons.

In 2014, Narkevich sustained a leg injury and sat out the whole season. She returned to the Belarusian group the following season. Narkevich was a member of the Belarusian group that won gold in 6 clubs / 2 hoops and bronze in the all-around at the inaugural European Games, in 2015. At the 2015 World Cup series in Kazan, Narkevich won the silver medal in group all-around, silver in 3 hoops / 6 clubs, and bronze in 5 ribbons. She announced her retirement at the end of the 2015 season.

== Detailed Olympic results ==
Year	Competition Description	Location	Music	Apparatus	Rank	Score-Final	Rank	Score-Qualifying
2012	Olympics	London		All-around	2nd	55.500	3rd	54.750
2012	Olympics	London	Allegro Non Molto (Winter) by Antonio Vivaldi	5 Balls	4th	27.825	3rd	27.900
2012	Olympics	London	24 Caprices, Op. 1: Caprice No. 24 in A Minor, Op. 1, No. 24 by Ilya Kaler	3 Ribbons + 2 Hoops	2nd	27.675	6th	26.850
