= Maryna Hancharova =

Belarusian rhythmic gymnast (born 1990)

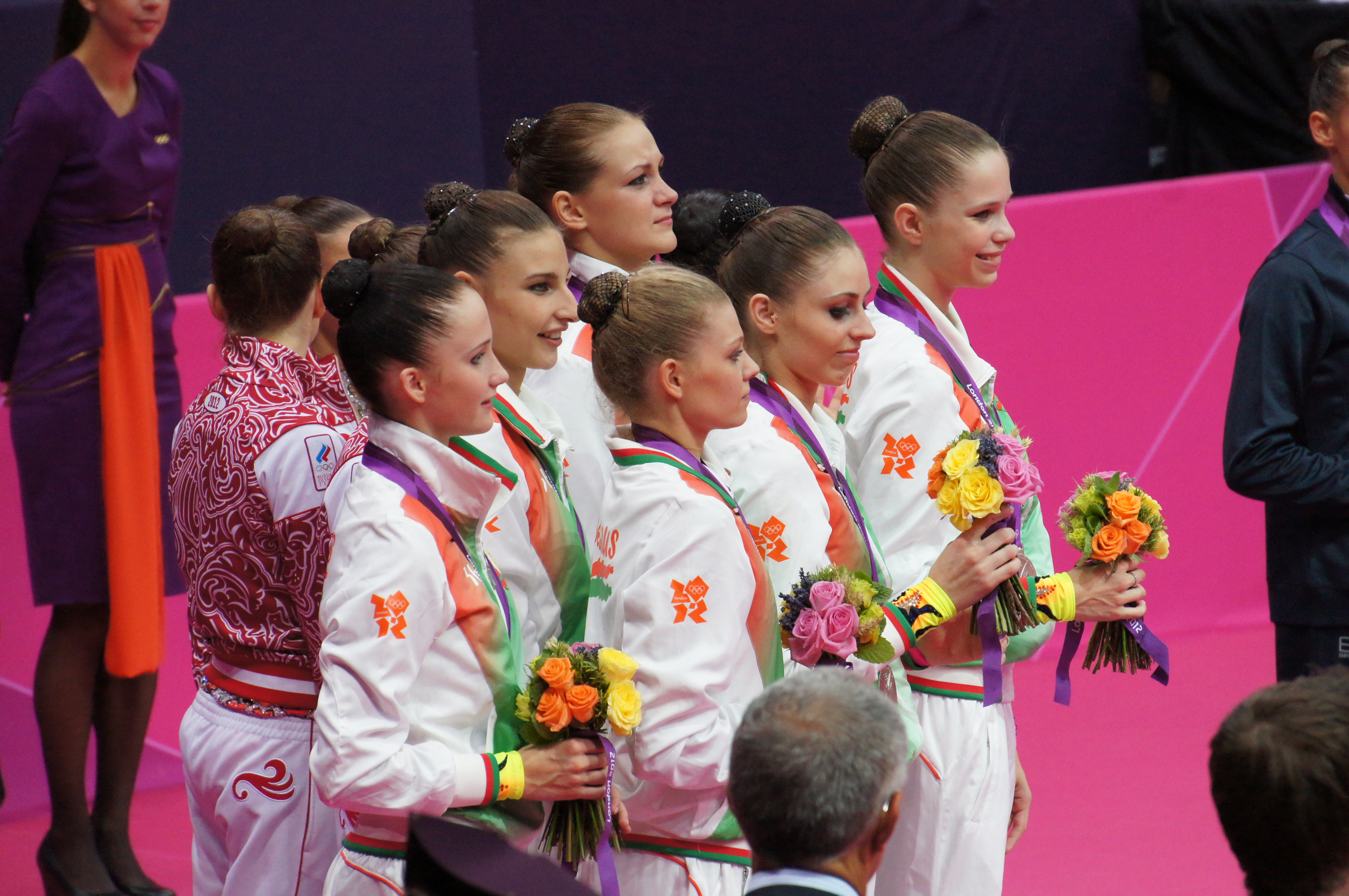
- Belarusian group all-around medalists at the 2012 Summer Olympics

Personal information
- Born: 27 February 1990 (age 36)

Gymnastics career
- Discipline: Rhythmic gymnastics
- Country represented: Belarus
Medal record
Group rhythmic gymnastics
Representing Belarus
Olympic Games
Silver medal – second place	2012 London	Group All-around
World Championships
Gold medal – first place	2013 Kyiv	Group All-around
Silver medal – second place	2010 Moscow	Group All-around
Silver medal – second place	2013 Kyiv	3 balls/2 ribbons
Bronze medal – third place	2010 Moscow	3 ribbons/2 ropes
European Championships
Gold medal – first place	2012 N. Novgorod	3 ribbons/2 hoops
Silver medal – second place	2010 Bremen	5 hoops
Silver medal – second place	2012 N. Novgorod	Group All-around
Bronze medal – third place	2010 Bremen	Group All-around
Bronze medal – third place	2010 Bremen	3 ribbons/2 hoops

Maryna Hancharova (Belarusian: Марына Сяргееўна Ганчарова; Łacinka: Maryna Siarhiejeŭna Hančarova; Russian: Марина Сергеевна Гончарова; born 27 February 1990, Minsk) is a Belarusian rhythmic gymnast who competed in group events. She is the 2012 Olympic all-around silver medalist with group members Anastasiya Ivankova, Alina Tumilovich, Nataliya Leshchyk, Aliaksandra Narkevich, and Kseniya Sankovich. She is also the 2013 World group all-around champion and 2012 European champion in 3 ribbons/2 hoops.

== Detailed Olympic results ==
Year	Competition Description	Location	Music	Apparatus	Rank	Score-Final	Rank	Score-Qualifying
2012	Olympics	London		All-around	2nd	55.500	3rd	54.750
2012	Olympics	London	Allegro Non Molto (Winter) by Antonio Vivaldi	5 Balls	4th	27.825	3rd	27.900
2012	Olympics	London	24 Caprices, Op. 1: Caprice No. 24 in A Minor, Op. 1, No. 24 by Ilya Kaler	3 Ribbons + 2 Hoops	2nd	27.675	6th	26.850
