= Maria Kadobina =

Belarusian rhythmic gymnast (born 1997)

- Nickname: Masha
- Born: 4 February 1997 (age 29) Minsk, Belarus
- Height: 174 cm (5 ft 9 in)

Gymnastics career
- Discipline: Rhythmic gymnastics
- Country represented: Belarus
- Head coach: Irina Leparskaya
- Assistant coach: Katsiaryna Bialiauskaya
- Choreographer: Halina Rhyzankova
Medal record
Representing Belarus
Group rhythmic gymnastics
World Championships
Bronze medal – third place	2014 İzmir	Group all-around
Bronze medal – third place	2014 İzmir	10 clubs
Bronze medal – third place	2014 İzmir	3 balls/2 ribbons
European Games
Gold medal – first place	2015 Baku	6 clubs/2 hoops
Bronze medal – third place	2015 Baku	Group all-around
European Championships
Gold medal – first place	2016 Holon	5 ribbons
Silver medal – second place	2016 Holon	Group all-around
Grand Prix Final
Bronze medal – third place	2013 Berlin	Ribbon
Junior European Championships
Silver medal – second place	2012 Nizhy Novgorod	Clubs
Silver medal – second place	2012 Nizhy Novgorod	Team

Maria Uladzimirauna Kadobina (Belarusian: Марыя Уладзіміраўна Кадобіна; Łacinka: Maryja Uladzimirauna Kadobina; Russian: Мария Владимировна Кадобина, Mariya Vladimirovna Kadobina; born 4 February 1997) is a Belarusian group rhythmic gymnast. She is the 2014 World Championships group all-around bronze medalist.

== Career ==
As a junior, Kadobina competed as an individual gymnast. She was member of the Belarusian Team (together with teammates Katsiaryna Halkina and Elena Bolotina that competed at the 2012 European Junior Championships where Team Belarus won the Team silver medal, she won another silver clubs final.

In 2013 season, Kadobina debuted as a senior, she competed at the 2013 Grand Prix Final in Berlin and finished 9th in all-around. She qualified to three event finals (ball, clubs, ribbon) and won bronze in ribbon.

In 2014, she was a member of the Belarusian group that competed at the 2014 European Championships, however they finished a distant 17th place in all-around finals after 3 mistakes from their 3 Balls + 2 Ribbons, the Group had performed under Khachaturian's "Sabre Dance" in their 2 Ribbons + 3 Balls routine, but had to change the exercise under a different music 2 weeks before the start of the event in Baku. Kadobina was with the Belarusian Group where on 5–7 September, at the 2014 World Cup series in Kazan, they won silver in Group all-around. Kadobina was member of the Belarusian Group that competed at the 2014 World Championships in İzmir, Turkey, they won 3 bronze medals in Group all-around, 10 Clubs and 3 Balls + 2 Ribbons Final.

In 2015, Kadobina was member of the Belarusian Group that won gold in 6 Clubs / 2 Hoops at the 2015 European Games, the Belarusian group also won bronze in the all-around. At the 2015 World Cup series in Kazan, Kadobina with the Belarusian Group won silver medals in Group all-around and 2 Hoops / 6 Clubs, they won bronze in 5 Ribbons.
