= Andrei Kavalenka =

Belarusian trap shooter (born 1955)

Andrei Kavalenka (born 9 March 1955 in Körmend, Hungary) is a trap shooter competing for Belarus. He competed in the trap event at the 2012 Summer Olympics and placed 34th and last in the qualification round.
