= Ilya Kaler =

Russian violinist (born 1963)

- Илья Калер
- Born: June 2, 1963 (age 63); Moscow, Russian SFSR, Soviet Union
- Occupations: Violinist; music educator
- Title: Professor of Violin at Cleveland Institute of Music
- Awards: Paganini Competition (Gold Medal); Sibelius Competition (Gold Medal); Tchaikovsky Competition (Gold Medal)
- Musical career
- Genre: Classical
- Years active: 1981–present
- Labels: Melodiya Classics; Naxos Classics; Ongaku Classics

Ilya Leonidovich Kaler (Russian: Илья Леонидович Калер; born June 2, 1963) is a Russian-born violinist. Born and educated in Moscow, Kaler is the only person to have won Gold Medals at all three of the International Tchaikovsky Competition (Moscow, 1986); the Sibelius (Helsinki, 1985); and the Paganini (Genoa, 1981).

== Education ==
Born into a family of an orchestral musician, Ilya Kaler showed musical talent from an early age. At the Central Music School for Especially Gifted Children of the Moscow Conservatory he studied under Zinaida Gilels. He continued his studies with Leonid Kogan and Viktor Tretiakov at the conservatory, where he earned both master's and doctorate degrees, and graduated with the Gold Medal Award. He also studied privately with Abram Shtern in Kyiv and Los Angeles.

== Career ==
From 1996 to 2001 he was concertmaster of the Rochester Philharmonic Orchestra. He has performed as soloist with the Leningrad, Moscow, and Dresden Philharmonic Orchestras, the Montreal Symphony Orchestra, the Danish and Berlin Radio Orchestras, and the Moscow and Zurich Chamber Orchestras, the Boston Philharmonic Orchestra, Detroit, Baltimore, Lansing and Seattle Symphony Orchestras, and at the Kennedy Center in Washington, D.C., in the United States, and has toured Germany, Ireland, Israel, Italy, Singapore, Korea, Taiwan, England, Venezuela and Japan. In Japan, he played with the New Japan Philharmonic, the Japan Century Symphony Orchestra and the Hiroshima Symphony. Also an active chamber musician, Kaler has performed for several summers at the Newport Music Festival in Newport, Rhode Island. His solo recitals have taken him throughout Europe, Scandinavia, East Asia, and the former Soviet Union.

Kaler was formerly Professor of Violin at the Eastman School of Music in Rochester, New York, Indiana University School of Music in Bloomington, Indiana, DePaul University School of Music in Chicago, Illinois. As of 2026, he is currently Professor of Violin at the Cleveland Institute of Music. He has adjudicated several violin competitions around the world including the International Tchaikovsky Competition.

Since 2007, Kaler has performed with cellist Amit Peled and pianist Alon Goldstein as the Tempest Trio both in the concert hall and in the recording studio.

== Recordings ==
Kaler has made many recordings (see Discography). The recordings released in the last ten years include works by Eugène Ysaÿe, Bach, Brahms, Schumann, Shostakovich, Glazunov, Szymanowski, Dvorak, Paganini, Tchaikovsky and Messiaen. His solo CD Ilya Kaler, violin was nominated for the NAIRD Indie Award in 1995 in the solo classical category.

== Discography ==
- 1987 Ilya Kaler: Prokofiev Sonata No. 2, Tchaikovsky Meditation, Shostakovich Five Preludes, Paganini I Palpiti (LP), Melodiya Classics
- 1990 Ilya Kaler: Vitali, Brahms, Paganini, Marcello, Wieniawski (LP), Melodiya Classics
- 1991 Ilya Kaler: Brahms Sonata No. 3, Prokofiev Five Melodies, Ysaÿe Sonata No. 6 (LP), Melodiya Classics
- 1993 Paganini Violin Concertos No. 1, Op. 6 & No. 2, Op. 7, Naxos Classics
- 1993 Paganini 24 Caprices, Op. 1, Naxos Classics
- 1994 Schumann Violin Sonatas Nos. 1 & 2; Intermezzo from FAE Sonata, Naxos Classics
- 1994 Glazunov Violin Concerto; Dvorak Violin Concerto, Romance Op. 11, Naxos Classics
- 1995 Ilya Kaler, violin, recital of works by Barkauskas, Hindemith, Martinon, Prokofiev, and Ysaÿe, Ongaku Classics
- 1995 Brahms Double Concerto, Op. 102; Schumann Cello Concerto, Op. 129, Naxos Classics
- 1997 Shostakovich Violin Concertos Nos. 1 & 2, Naxos Classics
- 1997 Glazunov The Seasons, Violin Concerto, Naxos Classics
- 2002 Brahms Violin Sonatas, Naxos Classics
- 2004 Ysaÿe Solo Violin Sonatas, Naxos Classics
- 2004 Olivier Messiaen: Quartet for the End of Time, Theme and Variations, Ongaku Classics
- 2007 Szymanowski Violin Concertos Nos. 1 & 2, Naxos Classics
- 2007 Tchaikovsky Violin Concerto, Serenade melancolique, Souvenir d'un lieu cher, Valse-Scherzo, Naxos Classics
- 2008 Bach Sonatas and Partitas for Solo Violin, BWV 1001-1006, Naxos Classics
- 2008 Brahms, Schumann Violin Concertos, Naxos Classics
- 2011 Karlowicz Violin Concerto, Serenade, Op. 2, Naxos Classics
- 2012 Sibelius Violin Concerto; Dvorak Violin Concerto, Naxos Classics
