= Olga Ilina =

Russian rhythmic gymnast (born 1995)

- Full name: Olga Sergeyevna Ilina
- Born: 3 January 1995 (age 31) Moscow, Russia

Gymnastics career
- Discipline: Rhythmic gymnastics
- Country represented: Russia
- Gym: Novogorsk
- Head coach: Irina Viner
- Assistant coach: Tatiana Sergaeva
- Choreographer: Tatiana Pomerantseva
- Retired: 2013
Medal record
Representing Russia
World Championships
Gold medal – first place	2011 Montpellier	5 Balls
Gold medal – first place	2013 Kyiv	2 Ribbon + 3 Balls
Silver medal – second place	2011 Montpellier	Group All-around
Bronze medal – third place	2013 Kyiv	Group All-around
European Championships
Gold medal – first place	2012 N. Novgorod	Group All-around
Gold medal – first place	2012 N. Novgorod	5 Balls
Summer Universiade
Gold medal – first place	2013 Kazan	Group All-around
Gold medal – first place	2013 Kazan	10 Clubs
Gold medal – first place	2013 Kazan	2 Ribbon + 3 Balls
Youth Olympic Games
Gold medal – first place	2010 Singapore	Group All-around
Junior European Championships
Gold medal – first place	2009 Baku	5 Ribbons

Olga Sergeyevna Ilina (Russian: Ольга Сергеевна Ильина; born 3 January 1995) is a Russian group rhythmic gymnast. She is the 2011 World Group All-around silver medalist, 2013 World Group All-around bronze medalist, 2012 European Group All-around champion, 2013 World Cup Final Group All-around champion and 2010 Youth Olympic Games Group All-around champion.

== Career ==
As a junior, Ilina was a member of the Russian group (with Ksenia Dudkina, Alina Makarenko and Karolina Sevastyanova) that won the gold medal at the 2010 Youth Olympic Games. She competed in her first senior Worlds at the 2011 World Championships where the Russian group won silver in Group All-around and gold in 5 Balls. She was also part of the gold medal-winning Russian group at the 2012 European Championships.

Ilina was not selected in the Russian group that competed at the 2012 London Olympics because of the return of veteran Russian group member Anastasia Nazarenko, who was misdiagnosed with a serious foot injury after the 2011 World Championships.

In 2013, Ilina sustained a knee injury at the start of the season but returned to competition with the Russian group at the 2013 Sofia World Cup. They won the silver medal in all-around and gold in 2 ribbons/3 balls final and then competed at the Minsk World Cup, winning gold in all-around, silver in 2 ribbons/3 balls and bronze in 10 clubs. Ilina and the rest of the Russian group (Ksenia Dudkina, Anastasia Bliznyuk, Anastasia Maksimova, Anastasia Nazarenko, Elena Romanchenko) won all the gold medals at the 2013 Summer Universiade in All-around, 10 clubs and 2 ribbons/3 balls. The Russian group won the gold medals in Group All-around, 10 clubs and 2 ribbons/3 balls at the 2013 World Cup Final in Saint Petersburg, Russia. Ilina and her Russian teammates won the Group All-around bronze medal at the 2013 World Championships, as well as gold in 2 Ribbon + 3 Balls final. She completed her career after the 2013 World Championships in Kyiv.

== Personal life ==
On 13 August 2019, she married Andrey Abramov, a physiotherapist of Russian National group in rhythmic gymnastics. In 2020, she gave birth to a child.
