= Tatiana Sergeeva =

Russian rhythmic gymnast

- Full name: Tatiana Dmitrievna Sergeeva
- Born: 28 May 1992 (age 34) Perm, Russia
- Height: 175 cm (5 ft 9 in)

Gymnastics career
- Discipline: Rhythmic gymnastics
- Country represented: Russia; (1996-2010)
- Head coach: Irina Viner
- Assistant coaches: Olesya Belugina, Valentina Ivanitskaya
- Former coaches: Elena Nefedova, Natalya Kukushkina
- Retired: yes
Medal record
Representing Russia
Group rhythmic gymnastics
World Championships
Gold medal – first place	2010 Moscow	3 Ribbons/ 2 Ropes
Gold medal – first place	2010 Moscow	5 Balls
Bronze medal – third place	2010 Moscow	Group All-around
European Championships
Gold medal – first place	2010 Bremen	Group All-around
Gold medal – first place	2010 Bremen	5 hoops
Gold medal – first place	2010 Bremen	3 Ribbons/ 2 Ropes

Tatiana Sergeeva (born 28 May 1992) is a Russian rhythmic gymnast.

== Personal life ==
Sergeeva was born in Perm but in the summer of 1992, her entire family moved to Ryazan. In 1996, she began to practice rhythmic gymnastics at the Ryazan Palace of Children's Creativity. In 2019 she graduated from the Faculty of Journalism of Lomonosov Moscow State University.

== Career ==
=== Junior ===
In 1998, Sergeeva moved to Lokomotiv to work with honored coach of Russia Olga Lisitsina. She successfully performed in Russian competitions, winning gold at the "Youth of Russia" tournament and the championship of Moscow's district.

In the fall of 2001, Tatiana took 4th place at the "Young Gymnasts" tournament. In December 2001, she performed at the first tournament in honor of Amina Zaripova, where she won silver. These competitions were attended by Irina Viner-Usmanova, who noticed Sergeeva's performance and invited her to perform at the Moscow Grand Prix in March.

In September 2002, she moved to Moscow and began training at the rhythmic gymnastics Olympic training center. In 2006, Elena Nefedova and Natalya Kukushkina became her coaches. At the 2007 Russian Championship in Dmitrov, she was 12th place, reaching the All-Around and hoop finals. At the 2007 Russian Cup in Chekhov, Sergeeva was the youngest participant in the competition, she got into the top 30 and competed in the All-Around final. In the summer of 2007, she took part in the III Summer Spartakiad of Russian students, becoming the bronze medalist as part of the Central Federal District's team.

=== Senior ===
At the 2008 Russian Championship in Saint Petersburg, she got into the top 15 and performed in the All-Around final. At the end of 2008, Sergeeva began training at the Novogorsk Training Center. At the beginning of 2009, Tatiana was included in the selection for the new Russian group, she was eventually selected and became a member of the main ensemble. In April 2010, she became European champion in the groups All-Around, 5 hoops and 3 ribbons + 2 ropes at the 26th European Championships in Bremen, Germany.

In September 2010, at the World Championship in Moscow, Tatiana and her teammates (Daria Shcherbakova, Uliana Donskova, Natalia Pichuzhkina, Ekaterina Malygina and Anastasia Nazarenko) won bronze in the All-Around final and becoming world champions with 5 hoops and 3 ribbons + 2 ropes.

Sergeeva received the title of Honored Master of Sports of Russia in autumn 2010. At the end of 2010, she decided to end her sports career.
