= Ye Yang =

Ye Yang may refer to:

- Yang Ye (gymnast) (born 1994), Chinese rhythmic gymnast
- Ting Shan-hsi (1935–2009), Chinese filmmaker and screenwriter, also credited under his pen name Er Yang or Ye Yang

== See also ==
- Yang Yong-eun (born 1972), South Korean golfer, known as Y.E. Yang in the west
- Yang Ye (died 986), general of the Northern Han and Song dynasties
