= List of Youth Olympic Games gold medalists who won Olympic gold medals =

This is a partial list of athletes who are Olympic and Youth Olympic gold medalists, having won at least one of both an Olympic and a Youth Olympics gold medal.

Names in Bold denote people that have competed in the most recent Youth Olympics, namely the 2024 Winter Youth Olympics in Gangwon and the 2018 Summer Youth Olympics in Buenos Aires or the most recent Olympics, namely the 2026 Winter Olympics in Milan and the 2024 Summer Olympics in Paris.

== Summer Games ==
Athlete	Nation	Gender	Sport	YOG	Event	OG	Event	Ref
**Chad le Clos**	South Africa	M	Swimming	2010 Singapore	Boys' 200 m individual medley	2012 London	Men's 200 m butterfly	
Madison Wilson	Australia	F	Swimming	2010 Singapore	Girls' 4 × 100 m medley relay	2016 Rio de Janeiro	Women's 4 × 100 m freestyle relay	
Madison Wilson	Australia	F	Swimming	2010 Singapore	Girls' 4 × 100 m medley relay	2020 Tokyo	Women's 4 × 100 m freestyle relay	
**Emma McKeon**	Australia	F	Swimming	2010 Singapore	Girls' 4 × 100 m medley relay	2016 Rio de Janeiro	Women's 4 × 100 m freestyle relay	
**Emma McKeon**	Australia	F	Swimming	2010 Singapore	Girls' 4 × 100 m medley relay	2020 Tokyo	Women's 50 m freestyle	
**Emma McKeon**	Australia	F	Swimming	2010 Singapore	Girls' 4 × 100 m medley relay	2020 Tokyo	Women's 100 m freestyle	
**Emma McKeon**	Australia	F	Swimming	2010 Singapore	Girls' 4 × 100 m medley relay	2020 Tokyo	Women's 4 × 100 m freestyle relay	
**Emma McKeon**	Australia	F	Swimming	2010 Singapore	Girls' 4 × 100 m medley relay	2020 Tokyo	Women's 4 × 100 m medley relay	
**Emma McKeon**	Australia	F	Swimming	2010 Singapore	Girls' 4 × 100 m medley relay	2024 Paris	Women's 4 × 100 m freestyle relay	
Robeisy Ramírez	Cuba	M	Boxing	2010 Singapore	Boys' bantamweight	2012 London	Men's flyweight	
Robeisy Ramírez	Cuba	M	Boxing	2010 Singapore	Boys' bantamweight	2016 Rio de Janeiro	Men's bantamweight	
Tony Yoka	France	M	Boxing	2010 Singapore	Men's super heavyweight	2016 Rio de Janeiro	Men's super heavyweight	
Yana Egorian	Russia	F	Fencing	2010 Singapore	Girls' sabre	2016 Rio de Janeiro	Women's sabre	
Yana Egorian	Russia	F	Fencing	2010 Singapore	Mixed team	2016 Rio de Janeiro	Women's team sabre	
**Jessica Fox**	Australia	F	Canoeing	2010 Singapore	Girls' K1 slalom	2020 Tokyo	Women's slalom C-1	
**Jessica Fox**	Australia	F	Canoeing	2010 Singapore	Girls' K1 slalom	2024 Paris	Women's slalom K-1	
Ksenia Dudkina	Russia	F	Rhythmic gymnastics	2010 Singapore	Group all-around	2012 London	Group all-around	
Alina Makarenko	Russia	F	Rhythmic gymnastics	2010 Singapore	Group all-around	2012 London	Group all-around	
**Alberta Santuccio**	Italy	F	Fencing	2010 Singapore	Mixed team	2024 Paris	Women's team épée	
Karolina Sevastyanova	Russia	F	Rhythmic gymnastics	2010 Singapore	Group all-around	2012 London	Group all-around	
Marloes Keetels	Netherlands	F	Field hockey	2010 Singapore	Girls' tournament	2020 Tokyo	Women's tournament	
Kim Jang-mi	South Korea	F	Shooting	2010 Singapore	Girls' 10 m air pistol	2012 London	Women's 25 m pistol	
**Jade Jones**	Great Britain	F	Taekwondo	2010 Singapore	Girls' 55 kg	2012 London	Women's 57 kg	
**Jade Jones**	Great Britain	F	Taekwondo	2010 Singapore	Girls' 55 kg	2016 Rio de Janeiro	Women's 57 kg	
**Mariya Lasitskene**	Russia	F	Athletics	2010 Singapore	Girls' high jump	2020 Tokyo	Women's high jump	
**Sándor Tótka**	Hungary	M	Canoeing	2010 Singapore	Boys' K1 sprint	2020 Tokyo	Men's K-1 200 m	
**Zheng Shuyin**	China	F	Taekwondo	2010 Singapore	Girls' +63 kg	2016 Rio de Janeiro	Women's +67 kg	
Deng Wei	China	F	Weightlifting	2010 Singapore	Girls' 58 kg	2016 Rio de Janeiro	Women's 63 kg	
Nijat Rahimov	Azerbaijan; Kazakhstan	M	Weightlifting	2010 Singapore	Boys' 69 kg	~~2016 Rio de Janeiro~~	~~Men's 77 kg~~	
**Hifumi Abe**	Japan	M	Judo	2014 Nanjing	Boys' 66 kg	2020 Tokyo	Men's 66 kg	
**Hifumi Abe**	Japan	M	Judo	2014 Nanjing	Boys' 66 kg	2024 Tokyo	Men's 66 kg	
**Napheesa Collier**	United States	F	Basketball	2014 Nanjing	Girls' 3x3 tournament	2020 Tokyo	Women's tournament	
**Fan Zhendong**	China	M	Table tennis	2014 Nanjing	Boys' singles	2020 Tokyo	Men's team	
**Fan Zhendong**	China	M	Table tennis	2014 Nanjing	Mixed team	2024 Paris	Men's singles	
**Fan Zhendong**	China	M	Table tennis	2014 Nanjing	Mixed team	2024 Paris	Men's team	
**Lee Woo-seok**	South Korea	M	Archery	2014 Nanjing	Boys' individual	2024 Paris	Men's team	
**Noah Lyles**	United States	M	Athletics	2014 Nanjing	Boys' 200 m	2024 Paris	Men's 100 m	
**Mayu Mukaida**	Japan	F	Wrestling	2014 Nanjing	Girls' 52 kg	2020 Tokyo	Women's 53 kg	
**Rūta Meilutytė**	Lithuania	F	Swimming	2014 Nanjing	Girls' 50 m breaststroke	2012 London	Women's 100 m breaststroke	
**Rūta Meilutytė**	Lithuania	F	Swimming	2014 Nanjing	Girls' 100 m breaststroke	2012 London	Women's 100 m breaststroke	
**Nikita Nagornyy**	Russia	M	Gymnastics	2014 Nanjing	Parallel Bars	2020 Tokyo	Men's team	
**Nikita Nagornyy**	Russia	M	Gymnastics	2014 Nanjing	Pommel Horse	2020 Tokyo	Men's team	
**Nikita Nagornyy**	Russia	M	Gymnastics	2014 Nanjing	Rings	2020 Tokyo	Men's team	
**Evgeny Rylov**	Russia	M	Swimming	2014 Nanjing	Boys' 50 m backstroke	2020 Tokyo	Men's 100 m backstroke	
**Evgeny Rylov**	Russia	M	Swimming	2014 Nanjing	Boys' 100 m backstroke	2020 Tokyo	Men's 200 m backstroke	
**Evgeny Rylov**	Russia	M	Swimming	2014 Nanjing	Boys' 4 × 100 m medley relay	2020 Tokyo	Men's 200 m backstroke	
**Panipak Wongpattanakit**	Thailand	F	Taekwondo	2014 Nanjing	Girls' 44 kg	2020 Tokyo	Women's 49 kg	
**Panipak Wongpattanakit**	Thailand	F	Taekwondo	2014 Nanjing	Girls' 44 kg	2024 Paris	Women's 49 kg	
**Duncan Scott**	Great Britain	M	Swimming	2014 Nanjing	Boys' 4 × 100 m freestyle relay	2020 Tokyo	Men's 4 × 200 m freestyle relay	
**Duncan Scott**	Great Britain	M	Swimming	2014 Nanjing	Boys' 4 × 100 m freestyle relay	2024 Tokyo	Men's 4 × 200 m freestyle relay	
**Yang Hao**	China	M	Diving	2014 Nanjing	Boys' 3m springboard	2024 Paris	Men's synchronized 10 m	
**Yang Hao**	China	M	Diving	2014 Nanjing	Boys' 10m platform	2024 Paris	Men's synchronized 10 m	
**Yang Haoran**	China	M	Shooting	2014 Nanjing	Boys' 10 m air rifle	2020 Tokyo	Mixed 10 m air rifle team	
**Zhang Yufei**	China	F	Swimming	2014 Nanjing	Girls' 4 × 100 m freestyle relay	2020 Tokyo	Women's 200 metre butterfly	
**Zhang Yufei**	China	F	Swimming	2014 Nanjing	Girls' 4 × 100 m medley relay	2020 Tokyo	Women's 4 × 200 metre freestyle relay	
**Zhang Yufei**	China	F	Swimming	2014 Nanjing	Mixed 4 × 100 m medley relay	2020 Tokyo	Women's 4 × 200 metre freestyle relay	
**Zhu Xueying**	China	F	Trampoline	2014 Nanjing	Girls' trampoline	2020 Tokyo	Women's trampoline	
**Thomas Ceccon**	Italy	M	Swimming	2018 Buenos Aires	Boys' 50 m freestyle	2024 Paris	Men's 100 m backstroke	
**Yaroslava Mahuchikh**	Ukraine	F	Athletics	2018 Buenos Aires	Girls' high jump	2024 Paris	Women's high jump	
**Kaylee McKeown**	Australia	F	Swimming	2018 Buenos Aires	Girls' 50 m backstroke	2020 Tokyo	Women's 100 m backstroke	
**Kaylee McKeown**	Australia	F	Swimming	2018 Buenos Aires	Girls' 50 m backstroke	2020 Tokyo	Women's 200 m backstroke	
**Kaylee McKeown**	Australia	F	Swimming	2018 Buenos Aires	Girls' 50 m backstroke	2020 Tokyo	Women's 4 × 100 m medley relay	
**Kaylee McKeown**	Australia	F	Swimming	2018 Buenos Aires	Girls' 50 m backstroke	2024 Paris	Women's 100 m backstroke	
**Kaylee McKeown**	Australia	F	Swimming	2018 Buenos Aires	Girls' 50 m backstroke	2024 Paris	Women's 200 m backstroke	
**Kristóf Milák**	Hungary	M	Swimming	2018 Buenos Aires	Boys' 200 m freestyle	2020 Tokyo	Men's 200 m butterfly	
**Kristóf Milák**	Hungary	M	Swimming	2018 Buenos Aires	Boys' 400 m freestyle	2020 Tokyo	Men's 200 m butterfly	
**Kristóf Milák**	Hungary	M	Swimming	2018 Buenos Aires	Boys' 200 m butterfly	2020 Tokyo	Men's 200 m butterfly	
**Kristóf Milák**	Hungary	M	Swimming	2018 Buenos Aires	Boys' 200 m butterfly	2024 Paris	Men's 100 m butterfly	
**Mahina Paul**	New Zealand	F	Rugby sevens	2018 Buenos Aires	Girls' tournament	2024 Paris	Women's tournament	
**Risi Pouri-Lane**	New Zealand	F	Rugby sevens	2018 Buenos Aires	Girls' tournament	2020 Tokyo	Women's tournament	
**Risi Pouri-Lane**	New Zealand	F	Rugby sevens	2018 Buenos Aires	Girls' tournament	2024 Paris	Women's tournament	
**Sun Yingsha**	China	F	Table tennis	2018 Buenos Aires	Girls' singles	2020 Tokyo	Women's team	
**Sun Yingsha**	China	F	Table tennis	2018 Buenos Aires	Mixed team	2024 Paris	Mixed doubles	
**Sun Yingsha**	China	F	Table tennis	2018 Buenos Aires	Mixed team	2024 Paris	Women's team	
**Wang Chuqin**	China	M	Table tennis	2018 Buenos Aires	Boys' singles	2024 Paris	Mixed doubles	
**Wang Chuqin**	China	M	Table tennis	2018 Buenos Aires	Mixed team	2024 Paris	Men's team	
**Yang Junxuan**	China	F	Swimming	2018 Buenos Aires	Girls' 4 × 100 m medley relay	2020 Tokyo	Women's 4 × 200 m freestyle relay	
**Yang Junxuan**	China	F	Swimming	2018 Buenos Aires	Mixed 4 × 100 m medley relay	2020 Tokyo	Women's 4 × 200 m freestyle relay	
**Sun Jiajun**	China	M	Swimming	2018 Buenos Aires	Boys' 100 m breaststroke	2024 Paris	Men's 4 x 100 m medley relay	
**Sun Jiajun**	China	M	Swimming	2018 Buenos Aires	Mixed 4 × 100 m medley relay	2024 Paris	Men's 4 x 100 m medley relay	

== Winter Games ==
Athlete	Nation	Gender	Sport	YOG	Event	OG	Event	Ref
**Victoria Carl**	Germany	F	Cross-country	2012 Innsbruck	CC / Biathlon mixed relay	2022 Beijing	Women's team sprint	
Lim Hyo-jun	South Korea	M	Short track	2012 Innsbruck	Boy's 1000 m	2018 Pyeongchang	Men's 1500 m	
Shim Suk-hee	South Korea	F	Short track	2012 Innsbruck	Girl's 500 m	2014 Sochi	Women's 3000 m relay	
Shim Suk-hee	South Korea	F	Short track	2012 Innsbruck	Girl's 1000 m	2018 Pyeongchang	Women's 3000 m relay	
**Petra Vlhová**	Slovakia	F	Alpine skiing	2012 Innsbruck	Girl's slalom	2022 Beijing	Women's slalom	
Andreas Wellinger	Germany	M	Ski jumping	2012 Innsbruck	Mixed team	2014 Sochi	Men's large hill team	
Andreas Wellinger	Germany	M	Ski jumping	2012 Innsbruck	Mixed team	2018 Pyeongchang	Men's normal hill individual	
**Hwang Dae-heon**	South Korea	M	Short track	2016 Lillehammer	Boy's 1000 m	2022 Beijing	Men's 1500 m	
**Chloe Kim**	United States	F	Snowboarding	2016 Lillehammer	Girl's halfpipe	2018 Pyeongchang	Women's halfpipe	
**Chloe Kim**	United States	F	Snowboarding	2016 Lillehammer	Girl's slopestyle	2022 Beijing	Women's halfpipe	
**Laura Nolte**	Germany	F	Bobsleigh	2016 Lillehammer	Girl's monobob	2022 Beijing	Two-woman	
**Laura Nolte**	Germany	F	Bobsleigh	2016 Lillehammer	Girl's monobob	2026 Milano Cortina	Two-woman	
**Birk Ruud**	Norway	M	Freestyle skiing	2016 Lillehammer	Boy's slopestyle	2022 Beijing	Men's big air	
**Birk Ruud**	Norway	M	Freestyle skiing	2016 Lillehammer	Boy's slopestyle	2026 Milano Cortina	Men's slopestyle	
**Eileen Gu**	China	F	Freestyle skiing	2020 Lausanne	Girl's big air	2022 Beijing	Women's big air	
**Eileen Gu**	China	F	Freestyle skiing	2020 Lausanne	Girl's halfpipe	2022 Beijing	Women's halfpipe	
**Eileen Gu**	China	F	Freestyle skiing	2020 Lausanne	Girl's halfpipe	2026 Milano Cortina	Women's halfpipe	
**Josie Baff**	Australia	F	Snowboarding	2020 Lausanne	Girl's snowboard cross	2026 Milano Cortina	Women's snowboard cross	
