= Zhang Ling =

Zhang Ling may refer to:

- Zhang Daoling (34–156), Eastern Han dynasty Taoist hermit
- Zhang Ling (author) (born 1957), Chinese audiologist and fiction writer based in Canada
- Zhang Ling (runner) (born 1981), Chinese middle-distance runner
- Zhang Ling (tennis) (born 1989), Chinese tennis player representing Hong Kong
- Zhang Ling (gymnast) (born 1992), Chinese rhythmic gymnast
- Zhang Ling (rower) (born 1997), Chinese rower
