= 2010 World Rhythmic Gymnastics Championships =

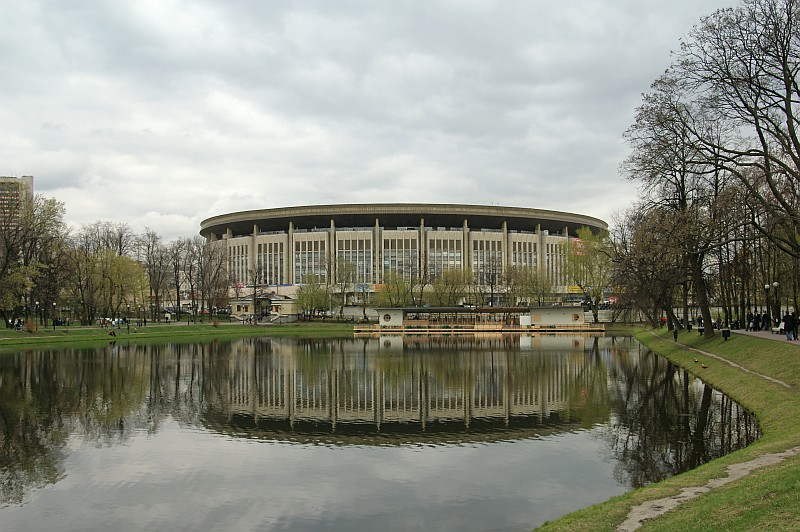
- Olympiysky Sports Complex, where the competition took place
- Venue: Olympiysky Sports Complex
- Location: Moscow, Russia
- Start date: 20 September 2010
- End date: 26 September 2010

The XXX World Rhythmic Gymnastics Championships were held in Moscow, Russia from 20 to 26 September 2010 at the Olympiysky Sports Complex. The events were all-around, ball, ribbon, hoop, rope and the group all around, group 5 hoops and group 3 ribbons + 2 ropes.

== Medal winners ==
Event	Gold	Silver	Bronze
Team Competition
Team	Russia; Evgenia Kanaeva; Daria Kondakova; Daria Dmitrieva; Yana Lukonina	Belarus; Liubov Charkashyna; Melitina Staniouta; Aliaksandra Narkevich; Hanna Rabtsava	Azerbaijan; Aliya Garayeva; Anna Gurbanova; Samira Mustafayeva
Individual Finals
Rope	Daria Kondakova (RUS)	Yevgeniya Kanayeva (RUS)	Melitina Staniouta (BLR)
Hoop	Yevgeniya Kanayeva (RUS)	Daria Kondakova (RUS)	Aliya Garayeva (AZE)
Ball	Yevgeniya Kanayeva (RUS)	Daria Dmitrieva (RUS)	Aliya Garayeva (AZE)
Ribbon	Daria Dmitrieva (RUS)	Daria Kondakova (RUS)	Aliya Garayeva (AZE)
All-Around	Yevgeniya Kanayeva (RUS)	Daria Kondakova (RUS)	Melitina Staniouta (BLR)
Groups Finals
All-Around	Italy; Elisa Blanchi; Giulia Galtarossa; Romina Laurito; Daniela Masseroni; Elisa Santoni; Anzhelika Savrayuk	Belarus; Maryna Hancharova; Anastasia Ivankova; Aliaksandra Osipava; Ksenia Sankovich; Alina Tumilovich	Russia; Uliana Donskova; Ekaterina Malygina; Anastasia Nazarenko; Natalia Pichuzhkina; Daria Shcherbakova; Tatiana Sergeeva
5 Hoops	Russia; Uliana Donskova; Ekaterina Malygina; Anastasia Nazarenko; Natalia Pichuzhkina; Daria Shcherbakova; Tatiana Sergeeva*	Italy; Elisa Blanchi; Giulia Galtarossa; Romina Laurito; Daniela Masseroni*; Elisa Santoni; Anzhelika Savrayuk	Bulgaria; Reneta Kamberova; Mihaela Maevska; Tsvetelina Naydenova*; Elena Todorova; Hristiana Todorova; Katrin Velkova
3 Ribbons + 2 Ropes	Russia; Uliana Donskova; Ekaterina Malygina; Anastasia Nazarenko; Natalia Pichuzhkina; Daria Shcherbakova*; Tatiana Sergeeva	Italy; Elisa Blanchi; Giulia Galtarossa*; Romina Laurito; Daniela Masseroni; Elisa Santoni; Anzhelika Savrayuk	Belarus; Maryna Hancharova; Anastasia Ivankova; Aliaksandra Osipava; Ksenia Sankovich; Alina Tumilovich

* reserve gymnast

== Individual ==
=== Qualification ===
- (Argentina) Ana Carrasco Pini
- (Argentina) Ayelen Paez Pieri
- (Argentina) Dar'Ya Shara
- (Armenia) Naira Minasyan
- (Armenia) Asya Simonyan
- (Armenia) Inesa Simonyan
- (Australia) Ayiesha Johnston
- (Australia) Janine Murray
- (Australia) Danielle Prince
- (Australia) Enid Sung
- (Austria) Selina Poestinger
- (Austria) Nicol Ruprecht
- (Austria) Caroline Weber
- (Azerbaijan) Aliya Garayeva
- (Azerbaijan) Anna Gurbanova
- (Azerbaijan) Samira Mustafayeva
- (Belarus) Liubou Charkashyna
- (Belarus) Aliaksandra Narkevich
- (Belarus) Hanna Rabtsava
- (Belarus) Melitina Staniouta
- (Brazil) Angelica Kvieczynski
- (Brazil) Drielly Neves Daltoe
- (Brazil) Rafaela Pedral Costa
- (Brazil) Eliane Rosa Sampaio
- (Bulgaria) Mariya Mateva
- (Bulgaria) Monika Mincheva
- (Bulgaria) Silviya Miteva
- (Bulgaria) Tsvetelina Stoyanova
- (Canada) Mariam Chamilova
- (Canada) Demetra Mantcheva
- (Canada) Nerissa Mo
- (Chile) Cristina Francisca Bello Contreras
- (China) Senyue Deng
- (China) Baobao Dou
- (China) Yanan Hou
- (China) Linyi Peng
- (Cyprus) Chrystalleni Trikomiti
- (Czech Republic) Nataly Hamrikova
- (Czech Republic) Monika Mickova
- (Czech Republic) Zuzana Valkova
- (Egypt) Heba Khaled Elbourini
- (Egypt) Yasmin Mohamed Rostom
- (Egypt) Mariz Farid Shawki
- (Spain) Marina Fernandez
- (Spain) Natalia García
- (Spain) Carolina Rodriguez
- (Spain) Júlia Usón
- (Estonia) Olga Bogdanova
- (Estonia) Viktoria Bogdanova
- (Estonia) Julija Makusina
- (Finland) Silja Ahonen
- (Finland) Inessa Rif
- (Finland) Julia Romanjuk
- (France) Delphine Ledoux
- (United Kingdom) Rachel Ennis
- (United Kingdom) Lynne Hutchison
- (United Kingdom) Francesca Jones
- (Georgia (country)) Filipa Simeonova
- (Greece) Varvara Filiou
- (Greece) Artemi Gavezou Castro
- (Greece) Michaela Metallidou
- (Hungary) Fanni Dalma Forray
- (Hungary) Anna Violetta Szaloki
- (Hungary) Dora Vass
- (India) Kshipra Joshi
- (India) Akshata Shete
- (India) Pooja Surve
- (Israel) Dana Adiv
- (Israel) Irina Risenson
- (Israel) Neta Rivkin
- (Italy) Martina Alicata Terranova
- (Italy) Julieta Cantaluppi
- (Italy) Federica Febbo
- (Japan) Yuria Onuki
- (Japan) Runa Yamaguchi
- (Kazakhstan) Anna Alyabyeva
- (Kazakhstan) Mizana Ismailova
- (Kazakhstan) Madina Mukanova
- (Kazakhstan) Marina Petrakova
- (Kyrgyzstan) Ainura Sharshembieva
- (South Korea) Gim Yun-hee
- (South Korea) Lee Kyung-hwa
- (South Korea) Shin Soo-ji
- (South Korea) Son Yeon-jae
- (Latvia) Jelizaveta Gamalejeva
- (Latvia) Veronika Romanova
- (Latvia) Jana Rudova
- (Latvia) Anastasija Suhova
- (Malaysia) Nur Hidayah Abdul Wahid
- (Malaysia) Elaine Koon
- (Moldova) Veronica Cumatrenco
- (Moldova) Ana Toma
- (Mexico) Rut Castillo Galindo
- (Mexico) Veronica Navarro
- (Mexico) Cynthia Valdez Perez
- (Mexico) Alejandra Vazquez Lopez
- (Namibia) Nicole Monique Bierbach
- (Norway) Thea Elise Holte
- (Norway) Josefine Hustoft
- (Norway) Frida Parnas
- (Norway) Yngvild Romcke
- (Poland) Joanna Mitrosz
- (Poland) Angelika Paradowska
- (Poland) Marta Szamalek
- (Qatar) Aya Hosain
- (Qatar) Samia Hussain
- (Romania) Alexandra Piscupescu
- (Romania) Adriana Cecilia Teocan
- (South Africa) Grace Legote
- (South Africa) Sibongile Mjekula
- (South Africa) Julene Van Rooyen
- (Russia) Daria Dmitrieva
- (Russia) Evgenia Kanaeva
- (Russia) Daria Kondakova
- (Russia) Yana Lukonina
- (Slovenia) Pia Arhar
- (Slovenia) Grusa Kocica
- (Slovenia) Evita Psenicny
- (Slovenia) Tjasa Seme
- (Serbia) Tijana Krsmanovic
- (Serbia) Andrea Moskovljevic
- (Slovakia) Ivana Dermekova
- (Slovakia) Jana Duchnovska
- (Slovakia) Alexandra Pokorna
- (Slovakia) Renata Smilnicka
- (Sweden) Therese Larsson
- (Sweden) Mikaela Lindholm
- (Sweden) Jennifer Pettersson
- (Thailand) Sirirat Lueprasert
- (Thailand) Manee Patanapongpibul
- (Thailand) Tharatip Sridee
- (Turkey) Nevin Sevinc Deveci
- (Turkey) Burcin Neziroglu
- (Turkey) Gozde Ozkebapci
- (Ukraine) Nataliia Godunko
- (Ukraine) Alina Maksymenko
- (Ukraine) Ganna Rizatdinova
- (United States) Joanna Arnold
- (United States) Shelby Kisiel
- (United States) Olga Pavlenko
- (United States) Julie Zetlin
- (Uzbekistan) Evelina Kalisher
- (Uzbekistan) Djamila Rakhmatova
- (Uzbekistan) Zamirajon Sanokulova
- (Uzbekistan) Ulyana Trofimova
- (Venezuela) Andreina Acevedo Martinez
- (Venezuela) Katherin Arias Olive
- (Venezuela) Leiyineth Medrano Rodriguez

=== Rope ===
The final was held on Tuesday, 21 September at 18:30 local time.

Place	Name	Dif.	Art.	Exe.	Pen.	Total
1st place, gold medalist(s)	Daria Kondakova (RUS)	9.550	9.750	9.450		28.750
2nd place, silver medalist(s)	Yevgeniya Kanayeva (RUS)	9.450	9.700	9.450		28.600
3rd place, bronze medalist(s)	Melitina Staniouta (BLR)	9.350	9.250	9.050		27.650
4	Alina Maksymenko (UKR)	8.900	9.250	9.150		27.300
5	Aliya Garayeva (AZE)	9.000	9.250	9.000		27.250
6	Irina Risenson (ISR)	8.850	9.050	8.900		26.800
7	Delphine Ledoux (FRA)	8.300	8.950	8.700		25.950
8	Ulyana Trofimova (UZB)	7.700	9.050	8.700		25.450

=== Hoop ===
The final was held on Tuesday, 21 September at 19:00 local time.

Place	Name	Dif.	Art.	Exe.	Pen.	Total
1st place, gold medalist(s)	Yevgeniya Kanayeva (RUS)	9.700	9.900	9.600		29.200
2nd place, silver medalist(s)	Daria Kondakova (RUS)	9.650	9.700	9.550		28.900
3rd place, bronze medalist(s)	Aliya Garayeva (AZE)	9.150	9.375	9.150		27.675
4	Melitina Staniouta (BLR)	9.100	9.350	8.950		27.400
5	Alina Maksymenko (UKR)	9.050	9.150	9.050		27.250
6	Liubov Charkashyna (BLR)	8.650	9.300	9.400		27.150
7	Anna Alyabyeva (KAZ)	8.600	9.300	9.050		26.950
8	Joanna Mitrosz (POL)	8.725	8.900	8.600	0.20	26.025

=== Ball ===
The final was held on Thursday, 23 September at 18:30 local time.

Place	Name	Dif.	Art.	Exe.	Pen.	Total
1st place, gold medalist(s)	Yevgeniya Kanayeva (RUS)	9.350	9.750	9.600		28.700
2nd place, silver medalist(s)	Daria Dmitrieva (RUS)	9.450	9.700	9.500		28.650
3rd place, bronze medalist(s)	Aliya Garayeva (AZE)	9.150	9.250	9.150		27.550
4	Liubov Charkashyna (BLR)	8.975	9.300	9.150		27.425
5	Irina Risenson (ISR)	8.950	9.000	9.050		27.000
6	Alina Maksymenko (UKR)	8.850	9.100	9.000		26.950
7	Neta Rivkin (ISR)	8.700	9.000	9.050		26.750
8	Silviya Miteva (BUL)	8.060	8.700	8.450	0.40	24.800

=== Ribbon ===
The final was held on Thursday, 23 September at 19:00 local time.

Place	Name	Dif.	Art.	Exe.	Pen.	Total
1st place, gold medalist(s)	Daria Dmitrieva (RUS)	9.650	9.675	9.500		28.825
2nd place, silver medalist(s)	Daria Kondakova (RUS)	9.550	9.600	9.600		28.750
3rd place, bronze medalist(s)	Aliya Garayeva (AZE)	9.400	9.350	9.300		28.050
4	Liubov Charkashyna (BLR)	9.200	9.250	9.125		27.575
5	Melitina Staniouta (BLR)	9.000	9.350	9.200		27.550
6	Silviya Miteva (BUL)	9.000	9.050	9.050		27.100
7	Joanna Mitrosz (POL)	8.900	9.000	8.950		26.850
8	Alina Maksymenko (UKR)	8.750	9.025	8.900		26.675

=== Teams ===
The competition was held from 20 to 23 September.

Place	Nation	Rope (rhythmic gymnastics)	Hoop (rhythmic gymnastics)	Ball (rhythmic gymnastics)	Ribbon (rhythmic gymnastics)	Total
1st place, gold medalist(s)	Russia	84.675 (1)	84.750 (1)	84.425 (1)	85.675 (1)	284.925
2nd place, silver medalist(s)	Belarus	78.675 (4)	81.475 (2)	80.350 (2)	79.200 (2)	269.700
3rd place, bronze medalist(s)	Azerbaijan	78.825 (2)	79.125 (3)	78.925 (4)	78.650 (3)	265.225
4	Ukraine	78.825 (2)	77.325 (4)	79.475 (3)	78.300 (4)	263.475
5	Israel	74.375 (9)	75.075 (7)	76.750 (5)	73.725 (8)	256.675
6	Kazakhstan	75.325 (5)	75.900 (5)	74.175 (8)	73.200 (11)	253.975
7	Bulgaria	74.100 (10)	75.150 (6)	75.325 (7)	75.025 (5)	252.750
8	Poland	74.450 (7)	74.625 (8)	73.200 (12)	74.625 (6)	250.950
9	Italy	75.000 (6)	72.700 (12)	74.050 (9)	74.200 (7)	248.750
10	Austria	74.400 (8)	73.425 (10)	73.550 (10)	73.425 (9)	248.625
11	Uzbekistan	73.925 (11)	73.400 (11)	73.250 (11)	69.575 (17)	246.550
12	South Korea	71.950 (13)	73.800 (9)	71.650 (16)	73.000 (12)	243.875
13	Greece	71.425 (14)	71.225 (15)	72.975 (14)	73.400 (10)	242.950
14	Spain	72.050 (12)	69.350 (18)	76.150 (6)	70.325 (15)	242.875
15	United States	70.125 (16)	71.100 (16)	73.000 (13)	70.550 (13)	241.250
16	China	70.025 (17)	71.575 (13)	72.400 (15)	67.550 (20)	237.600
17	Hungary	70.275 (15)	68.875 (19)	70.775 (17)	67.700 (19)	235.625
18	Mexico	67.950 (22)	71.525 (14)	69.275 (19)	69.825 (16)	235.325
19	Australia	67.675 (25)	70.300 (17)	69.200 (20)	70.350 (14)	235.000
20	Turkey	68.475 (20)	68.850 (20)	70.075 (18)	68.650 (18)	232.525
21	Sweden	67.900 (23)	68.750 (21)	68.350 (22)	65.275 (26)	228.025
22	Brazil	67.750 (24)	68.500 (22)	67.605 (24)	62.725 (32)	227.075
23	Estonia	68.275 (21)	67.325 (25)	69.050 (21)	63.950 (30)	226.150
24	Canada	68.825 (18)	64.950 (30)	66.950 (27)	67.250 (21)	225.800
25	United Kingdom	63.675 (32)	68.275 (23)	67.725 (23)	66.125 (24)	224.725
26	Czech Republic	68.825 (18)	66.425 (26)	63.775 (34)	64.725 (27)	223.875
27	Finland	64.000 (30)	68.150 (24)	67.550 (25)	64.625 (28)	223.600
28	Latvia	66.425 (26)	65.250 (29)	67.725 (26)	66.075 (25)	223.225
29	Egypt	66.100 (27)	66.000 (28)	66.425 (29)	66.200 (23)	222.700
30	Slovenia	64.725 (28)	66.375 (27)	66.775 (28)	63.650 (31)	222.075
31	Argentina	61.750 (34)	63.275 (33)	65.250 (31)	66.925 (22)	217.250
32	Slovakia	64.000 (30)	64.875 (31)	65.600 (30)	62.350 (33)	215.600
33	Norway	64.425 (29)	62.750 (34)	61.175 (36)	64.100 (29)	212.325
34	Venezuela	61.225 (35)	62.700 (35)	64.150 (32)	61.700 (34)	211.950
35	South Africa	63.350 (33)	63.375 (32)	63.900 (33)	60.025 (35)	211.775
36	Thailand	60.550 (36)	61.850 (36)	63.100 (35)	58.550 (36)	207.475
37	Armenia	51.925 (27)	50.150 (37)	55.175 (37)	48.375 (37)	175.475
38	India	45.500 (38)	46.475 (38)	49.850 (38)	47.475 (38)	159.200

=== All-around ===
The competition was held at 24 September at 19:00 local time.

Place	Name	Rope (rhythmic gymnastics)	Hoop (rhythmic gymnastics)	Ball (rhythmic gymnastics)	Ribbon (rhythmic gymnastics)	Total
1st place, gold medalist(s)	Yevgeniya Kanayeva (RUS)	28.950 (1)	29.100 (1)	29.350 (1)	28.850 (1)	116.250
2nd place, silver medalist(s)	Daria Kondakova (RUS)	28.675 (2)	28.750 (2)	28.000 (2)	28.400 (2)	113.825
3rd place, bronze medalist(s)	Melitina Staniouta (BLR)	27.275 (4)	27.700 (3)	27.625 (4)	27.750 (4)	110.350
4	Aliya Garayeva (AZE)	27.450 (3)	27.300 (5)	27.750 (3)	27.800 (3)	110.300
5	Alina Maksymenko (UKR)	27.125 (5)	27.400 (4)	27.175 (6)	27.250 (5)	108.950
6	Silvia Miteva (BUL)	27.075 (6)	26.950 (9)	27.450 (5)	26.875 (8)	108.350
7	Anna Alyabyeva (KAZ)	27.050 (7)	27.125 (7)	26.250 (12)	27.100 (7)	107.525
8	Joanna Mitrosz (POL)	26.800 (8)	26.650 (10)	26.700 (9)	26.650 (10)	106.800
9	Irina Risenson (ISR)	26.500 (9)	27.000 (8)	26.350 (11)	26.850 (9)	106.700
10	Liubov Charkashyna (BLR)	26.500 (9)	25.800 (16)	27.000 (7)	27.200 (6)	106.500
11	Neta Rivkin (ISR)	26.450 (11)	26.550 (11)	26.450 (10)	26.500 (11)	105.950
12	Ulyana Trofimova (UZB)	26.050 (13)	27.150 (6)	26.900 (8)	25.250 (17)	105.350
13	Delphine Ledoux (FRA)	26.100 (12)	26.350 (12)	26.200 (14)	26.050 (12)	104.700
14	Anna Gurbanova (AZE)	26.050 (13)	25.900 (15)	26.225 (13)	25.400 (16)	103.575
15	Caroline Weber (AUT)	25.700 (16)	26.050 (14)	25.725 (15)	25.850 (13)	103.325
16	Julieta Cantaluppi (ITA)	25.275 (19)	25.800 (16)	25.700 (16)	25.200 (19)	101.975
17	Carolina Rodriguez Ballesteros (ESP)	25.450 (17)	25.225 (20)	25.700 (16)	25.450 (15)	101.825
18	Natalia Godunko (UKR)	26.000 (15)	26.300 (13)	23.300 (24)	25.750 (14)	101.350
19	Yuria Onuki (JPN)	25.350 (18)	24.700 (22)	25.525 (18)	24.850 (21)	100.425
20	Marina Petrakova (KAZ)	24.825 (22)	25.450 (19)	25.375 (20)	24.650 (22)	100.300
21	Deng Senyue (CHN)	25.175 (20)	25.650 (18)	24.975 (21)	24.450 (24)	100.250
22	Monika Mincheva (BUL)	24.750 (23)	25.100 (21)	24.850 (22)	25.250 (17)	99.950
23	Julie Zetlin (USA)	24.325 (24)	24.650 (23)	25.400 (19)	24.650 (22)	99.025
24	Dora Vass (HUN)	24.850 (21)	24.575 (24)	24.100 (23)	25.050 (20)	98.575

== Groups ==
=== Group compositions ===
- (Australia) Jaelle Cohen
- (Australia) Anna Lorigan
- (Australia) Claudia Pillay
- (Australia) Samantha Richardson
- (Australia) Enid Sung
- (Australia) Kate Western
- (Austria) Barbara Sophie Lanzer
- (Austria) Sophia Lindtner
- (Austria) Claudia Linert
- (Austria) Susanna Pröll
- (Austria) Melissa Schmidt
- (Austria) Natascha Wegscheider
- (Azerbaijan) Nigar Abdusalimova
- (Azerbaijan) Jeyla Guliyeva
- (Azerbaijan) Ayelita Khalafova
- (Azerbaijan) Anastasiya Prasolova
- (Azerbaijan) Stefani Trayanova
- (Azerbaijan) Yevgeniya Zhidkova
- (Belarus) Maryna Hancharova
- (Belarus) Anastasiya Ivankova
- (Belarus) Aliaksandra Osipava
- (Belarus) Kseniya Sankovich
- (Belarus) Alina Tumilovich
- (Brazil) Ana Paula De Alencar
- (Brazil) Leticia Dutra
- (Brazil) Larissa Maia Barata
- (Brazil) Jessica Maier
- (Brazil) Luisa Harumi Matsuo
- (Brazil) Ana Paula Ribeiro
- (Bulgaria) Reneta Kamberova
- (Bulgaria) Mihaela Maevska
- (Bulgaria) Tsvetelina Naydenova
- (Bulgaria) Elena Todorova
- (Bulgaria) Hristiana Todorova
- (Bulgaria) Katrin Velkova
- (Canada) Rose Cossar
- (Canada) Karah Klodt
- (Canada) Alexandra Landry
- (Canada) Alexandra Lukashova
- (Canada) Kelsey Titmarsh
- (Canada) Ani Wells
- (China) Yuyan Bao
- (China) Xiaoyi Long
- (China) Lijia Wang
- (China) Xue Wang
- (China) Yuting Wang
- (China) Li Zou
- (Spain) Loreto Achaerandio
- (Spain) Sandra Aguilar
- (Spain) Miriam Belando Consuegra
- (Spain) Elena Lopez
- (Spain) Alejandra Quereda
- (Spain) Lidia Redondo
- (Finland) Jenna Alavahtola
- (Finland) Julia Kinnunen
- (Finland) Aino Poytaniemi
- (Finland) Rebecca Sutton
- (Finland) Salla Helena Johanna Vikkula
- (France) Noemie Balthazard
- (France) Adelaide Deloeuvre
- (France) Melanie Haag
- (France) Jeanne Isenmann
- (France) Lea Peinoit
- (France) Violaine Robinet
- (United Kingdom) Samantha Dean
- (United Kingdom) Kerrie Denton
- (United Kingdom) Hannah Dulston
- (United Kingdom) Louisa Pouli
- (United Kingdom) Rachel Smith
- (Georgia (country)) Ketevani Asitashvili
- (Georgia (country)) Romina Bozhilova
- (Georgia (country)) Martina Grozeva
- (Georgia (country)) Teona Khelaia
- (Georgia (country)) Irine Khoperia
- (Germany) Mira Bimperling
- (Germany) Camilla Pfeffer
- (Germany) Cathrin Puhl
- (Germany) Sara Radman
- (Germany) Regina Sergeeva
- (Greece) Alexandra Georgovasili
- (Greece) Stavroula Samara
- (Greece) Athina Tsinaslanidou
- (Greece) Despoina Tsoumalakou
- (Greece) Marianthi Zafeiriou
- (Hungary) Julianna Buda
- (Hungary) Judith Hauser
- (Hungary) Barbara Katona
- (Hungary) Fanni Kohlhoffer
- (Hungary) Daria Topic
- (Hungary) Agnes Vandor
- (Israel) Moran Buzovski
- (Israel) Viktoriya Koshel
- (Israel) Noa Palatchy
- (Israel) Marina Shults
- (Israel) Polina Zakaluzny
- (Israel) Eliora Zholkovsky
- (Italy) Elisa Blanchi
- (Italy) Giulia Galtarossa
- (Italy) Romina Laurito
- (Italy) Daniela Masseroni
- (Italy) Elisa Santoni
- (Italy) Anzhelika Savrayuk
- (Japan) Yuka Endo
- (Japan) Natsuki Fukase
- (Japan) Airi Hatakeyama
- (Japan) Rie Matsubara
- (Japan) Nina Saeedyokota
- (Japan) Kotono Tanaka
- (Kazakhstan) Valeriya Danilina
- (Kazakhstan) Viktoriya Fedonyuk
- (Kazakhstan) Akbota Kalimzhanova
- (Kazakhstan) Dinara Serikbayeva
- (Kazakhstan) Darya Shevchenko
- (Kazakhstan) Aliya Tleubayeva
- (South Korea) Ji Seon Baek
- (South Korea) Hyeonhee Choi
- (South Korea) Hyejeang Ha
- (South Korea) Hyejin Kim
- (South Korea) Kyung Eun Lee
- (South Korea) Unjin Sin
- (Poland) Zuzanna Klajman
- (Poland) Monika Raszke
- (Poland) Patrycja Romik
- (Poland) Aleksandra Wojcik
- (Poland) Katarzyna Zuchlinska
- (North Korea) Ryon Choe
- (North Korea) Un Byol Kang
- (North Korea) Song Sun Kim
- (North Korea) Song Mi Mun
- (North Korea) Jin Ju Ri
- (Russia) Uliana Donskova
- (Russia) Ekaterina Malygina
- (Russia) Anastasia Nazarenko
- (Russia) Natalia Pichuzhkina
- (Russia) Tatiana Sergeeva
- (Russia) Daria Shcherbakova
- (Switzerland) Capucine Jelmi
- (Switzerland) Nathanya Koehn
- (Switzerland) Marine Perichon
- (Switzerland) Carol Rohatsch
- (Switzerland) Lisa Tacchelli
- (Switzerland) Souheila Yacoub
- (Ukraine) Olena Dmytrash
- (Ukraine) Viktoriya Lenyshyn
- (Ukraine) Svitlana Prokopova
- (Ukraine) Valeria Shurkhal
- (Ukraine) Iuliia Slobodyan
- (Ukraine) Olga Zaytseva
- (United States) Jessica Bogdanov
- (United States) Stephanie Flaksman
- (United States) Megan Frohlich
- (United States) Michelle Przybylo
- (United States) Sofya Roytburg
- (United States) Sydney Sachs
- (Uzbekistan) Lyubov Dropets
- (Uzbekistan) Veronika Esipova
- (Uzbekistan) Ekaterina Safronova
- (Uzbekistan) Inara Sattarova
- (Uzbekistan) Yayra Serjanova
- (Venezuela) Catherine Carolina Cortez Egea
- (Venezuela) Marian Carlina Parra Rodriguez
- (Venezuela) Michelle Sanchez Salazar
- (Venezuela) Nathalia Jesus Serrano Sanchez
- (Venezuela) Nathalia De Jesus Silva Amaro
- (Venezuela) Alejandra Carolina Vasquez Castillo

=== All-around ===
The final was held at 25 September 2010 at 14:00 local time.

Place	Nation	5	3 + 2	Total
1st place, gold medalist(s)	Italy	27.825 (1)	27.700 (1)	55.525
2nd place, silver medalist(s)	Belarus	27.650 (2)	27.150 (2)	54.800
3rd place, bronze medalist(s)	Russia	25.275 (7)	27.150 (3)	52.425
4	Israel	26.050 (4)	25.900 (4)	51.950
5	Bulgaria	26.400 (3)	25.000 (10)	51.400
6	Japan	25.700 (5)	25.325 (7)	51.025
7	Azerbaijan	25.475 (6)	25.500 (6)	50.975
8	Germany	24.950 (8)	25.900 (5)	50.850
9	Switzerland	24.750 (10)	25.025 (9)	49.775
10	Hungary	24.800 (9)	23.925 (11)	48.725
11	China	24.575 (11)	23.600 (12)	48.175
12	Poland	23.850 (13)	22.900 (15)	46.750
13	Ukraine	23.200 (16)	23.050 (14)	46.250
14	Canada	23.625 (14)	22.400 (19)	46.025
15	Spain	20.800 (25)	25.150 (8)	45.950
16	France	22.500 (19)	23.250 (13)	45.750
17	Finland	23.325 (15)	22.050 (22)	45.375
18	Greece	23.050 (17)	22.275 (20)	45.325
19	Austria	22.175 (21)	22.750 (16)	44.925
20	North Korea	23.950 (12)	20.850 (24)	44.800
21	Kazakhstan	22.425 (20)	21.925 (23)	44.250
22	United States	21.250 (24)	22.500 (17)	43.750
23	South Korea	21.250 (22)	22.250 (21)	43.500
24	Uzbekistan	23.025 (18)	20.450 (26)	43.475
25	Georgia	20.725 (26)	22.425 (18)	43.150
26	Brazil	21.250 (23)	20.775 (25)	42.025
27	Australia	20.450 (27)	17.900 (27)	38.350
28	Venezuela	19.825 (28)	16.800 (28)	36.625
29	United Kingdom	19.450 (29)	14.150 (29)	33.600

=== 5 Hoops ===
The final was held on Sunday, 26 September at 14:00 local time.

Place	Name	Dif.	Art.	Exe.	Pen.	Total
1st place, gold medalist(s)	Russia	9.375	9.500	9.100		27.975
2nd place, silver medalist(s)	Italy	9.325	9.400	9.150		27.875
3rd place, bronze medalist(s)	Bulgaria	9.000	9.200	8.900		27.100
4	Israel	8.450	8.750	8.650		25.850
5	Germany	8.375	8.800	8.650		25.825
6	Japan	8.375	8.800	8.550		25.725
7	Belarus	8.500	8.950	8.350	0.40	25.400
8	Azerbaijan	8.050	8.700	8.600		25.350

=== 3 Ribbons + 2 Ropes ===
The final was held on Sunday, 26 September at 14:00 local time.

Place	Name	Dif.	Art.	Exe.	Pen.	Total
1st place, gold medalist(s)	Russia	9.500	9.450	9.100		28.050
2nd place, silver medalist(s)	Italy	9.450	9.400	9.050		27.900
3rd place, bronze medalist(s)	Belarus	9.000	9.200	8.950		27.150
4	Israel	8.550	8.750	8.600		25.900
5	Germany	8.650	8.750	8.500		25.900
6	Japan	8.475	8.700	8.400		25.575
7	Azerbaijan	8.425	8.450	8.500		25.375
8	Spain	8.500	8.350	7.850		24.700

== Medal table ==
Rank	Nation	Gold	Silver	Bronze	Total
1	Russia	8	5	1	14
2	Italy	1	2	0	3
3	Belarus	0	2	3	5
4	Azerbaijan	0	0	4	4
5	Bulgaria	0	0	1	1
Totals (5 entries)		9	9	9	27
