= Gymnastics at the 2013 Summer Universiade =

Gymnastics at the XXVII Summer Universiade
- Venue: Gymnastics Centre
- Dates: July 7, 2013 – July 10, 2013

Gymnastics was contested at the 2013 Summer Universiade from July 7 to 10 at the Gymnastics Centre in Kazan, Russia. Artistic and rhythmic gymnastics was the two disciplines of gymnastics contested.

== Combined Medal table ==
Rank	Nation	Gold	Silver	Bronze	Total
1	Russia (RUS)*	18	8	3	29
2	Japan (JPN)	1	4	3	8
3	South Korea (KOR)	1	2	0	3
4	Brazil (BRA)	1	0	0	1
4	China (CHN)	1	0	0	1
4	North Korea (PRK)	1	0	0	1
7	Ukraine (UKR)	0	4	11	15
8	Germany (GER)	0	2	3	5
9	Mexico (MEX)	0	2	0	2
10	Canada (CAN)	0	1	1	2
11	Belarus (BLR)	0	1	0	1
12	Bulgaria (BUL)	0	0	1	1
Totals (12 entries)		23	24	22	69

== Artistic gymnastics ==
=== Men's events ===
Event	Gold	Silver	Bronze
Team all-around	Russia (RUS); Denis Ablyazin; David Belyavskiy; Emin Garibov; Nikita Ignatyev; Nikolai Kuksenkov	Ukraine (UKR); Petro Pakhnyuk; Maksym Semiankiv; Oleh Vernyayev; Oleh Stepko; Ihor Radivilov	Japan (JPN); Hiroki Ishikawa; Ryohei Kato; Shogo Nonomura; Yusuke Tanaka; Chihiro Yoshioka
Individual all-around	Nikolai Kuksenkov; Russia	Fabian Hambüchen; Germany	David Belyavskiy; Russia
Individual all-around	Nikolai Kuksenkov; Russia	Fabian Hambüchen; Germany	Oleh Vernyayev; Ukraine
Floor	Ryohei Kato; Japan	Fabian Hambüchen; Germany	David Belyavskiy; Russia
Pommel horse	Nikolai Kuksenkov; Russia	Daniel Corral; Mexico	Oleh Stepko; Ukraine
Rings	Arthur Zanetti; Brazil	Denis Ablyazin; Russia	Ihor Radivilov; Ukraine
Vault	Yang Hak-Seon; South Korea	Denis Ablyazin; Russia	Ihor Radivilov; Ukraine
Parallel bars	Emin Garibov; Russia	David Belyavskiy; Russia	Oleh Vernyayev; Ukraine
Horizontal bar	Emin Garibov; Russia	Yusuke Tanaka; Japan	Ryohei Kato; Japan

=== Women's events ===
Event	Gold	Silver	Bronze
Team all-around	Russia (RUS); Ksenia Afanasyeva; Anna Dementyeva; Aliya Mustafina; Tatiana Nabieva; Maria Paseka	Japan (JPN); Yu Minobe; Mizuho Nagai; Sakura Noda; Arisa Tominaga; Shizuka Tozawa	Germany (GER); Kim Bui; Lisa Katharina Hill; Pia Tolle; Annabelle Hölzer
Individual all-around	Aliya Mustafina; Russia	Ksenia Afanasyeva; Russia	Kim Bui; Germany
Vault	Hong Un-Jong; North Korea	None awarded	Maria Paseka; Russia
Vault	Ksenia Afanasyeva; Russia	None awarded	Maria Paseka; Russia
Uneven bars	Aliya Mustafina; Russia	Tatiana Nabieva; Russia	Lisa Katharina Hill; Germany
Balance beam	Zhang Yelinzi; China	Aliya Mustafina; Russia	Elsabeth Black; Canada
Floor	Ksenia Afanasyeva; Russia	Elsabeth Black; Canada	None awarded
Floor	Ksenia Afanasyeva; Russia	Elsa García; Mexico	None awarded

=== Medal table ===
Rank	Nation	Gold	Silver	Bronze	Total
1	Russia (RUS)*	10	6	3	19
2	Japan (JPN)	1	2	2	5
3	South Korea (KOR)	1	1	0	2
4	Brazil (BRA)	1	0	0	1
4	China (CHN)	1	0	0	1
4	North Korea (PRK)	1	0	0	1
7	Germany (GER)	0	2	3	5
8	Mexico (MEX)	0	2	0	2
9	Ukraine (UKR)	0	1	5	6
10	Canada (CAN)	0	1	1	2
Totals (10 entries)		15	15	14	44

== Rhythmic gymnastics ==
=== Individual ===
Event	Gold	Silver	Bronze
Individual all-around	Margarita Mamun; Russia	Alexandra Merkulova; Russia	Ganna Rizatdinova; Ukraine
Individual hoop	Margarita Mamun; Russia	Melitina Staniouta; Belarus	Alina Maksymenko; Ukraine
Individual hoop	Margarita Mamun; Russia	Melitina Staniouta; Belarus	Ganna Rizatdinova; Ukraine
Individual ball	Alexandra Merkulova; Russia	Son Yeon-Jae; South Korea	Ganna Rizatdinova; Ukraine
Individual clubs	Margarita Mamun; Russia	Alina Maksymenko; Ukraine	None awarded
Individual clubs	Margarita Mamun; Russia	Ganna Rizatdinova; Ukraine	None awarded
Individual ribbon	Margarita Mamun; Russia	Alexandra Merkulova; Russia	Sylvia Miteva; Bulgaria

=== Group ===
Event	Gold	Silver	Bronze
Group all-around	Russia (RUS); Anastasia Bliznyuk; Ksenia Dudkina; Olga Ilina; Anastasia Maksimova; Anastasia Nazarenko; Elena Romanchenko	Ukraine (UKR); Olena Dmytrash; Yevgeniya Gomon; Oleksandra Gridasova; Valeria Gudym; Viktoria Mazur; Svitlana Prokopova	Japan (JPN); Yukari Hatano; Erika Koga; Naomi Kumazawa; Rina Miura; Ayano Sato; Ayumi Yusa
Group 10 clubs	Russia (RUS); Anastasia Bliznyuk; Ksenia Dudkina; Olga Ilina; Anastasia Maksimova; Anastasia Nazarenko; Elena Romanchenko	Japan (JPN); Yukari Hatano; Erika Koga; Naomi Kumazawa; Rina Miura; Ayano Sato; Ayumi Yusa	Ukraine (UKR); Olena Dmytrash; Yevgeniya Gomon; Oleksandra Gridasova; Valeria Gudym; Viktoria Mazur; Svitlana Prokopova
Group 3 balls + 2 ribbons	Russia (RUS); Anastasia Bliznyuk; Ksenia Dudkina; Olga Ilina; Anastasia Maksimova; Anastasia Nazarenko; Elena Romanchenko	Japan (JPN); Yukari Hatano; Erika Koga; Naomi Kumazawa; Rina Miura; Ayano Sato; Ayumi Yusa	Ukraine (UKR); Olena Dmytrash; Yevgeniya Gomon; Oleksandra Gridasova; Valeria Gudym; Viktoria Mazur; Svitlana Prokopova

=== Medal table ===
Rank	Nation	Gold	Silver	Bronze	Total
1	Russia (RUS)*	8	2	0	10
2	Ukraine (UKR)	0	3	6	9
3	Japan (JPN)	0	2	1	3
4	Belarus (BLR)	0	1	0	1
4	South Korea (KOR)	0	1	0	1
6	Bulgaria (BUL)	0	0	1	1
Totals (6 entries)		8	9	8	25
