= Gymnastics at the 2010 Summer Youth Olympics – Women's rhythmic group all-around =

The girls' rhythmic team all-around competition at the 2010 Summer Youth Olympics was held at the Bishan Sports Hall.

Teams consist of four gymnasts whom all perform in each routine. There are two rounds, a preliminary and a final, with each round consisting of two routines. In the preliminary, each team completes one routine using four hoops and one routine using four ribbons. The four teams with the highest combined scores in the two routines advance to the final. There, they perform the two routines again. Scores from the preliminary are ignored, and the teams are ranked according to their combined score in the two finals routines.

== Medalists ==
Gold	Silver	Bronze
Russia; Ksenia Dudkina; Olga Ilina; Alina Makarenko; Karolina Sevastyanova	Egypt; Farida Sherif Eid; Jacinthe Tarek Eldeeb; Manar Khaled Mohamed Elgarf; Aicha Mohamed Tarek Niazi	Canada; Katrina Cameron; Melodie Omidi; Anjelika Reznik; Victoria Reznik

== Qualification ==
Rank	Team	4 Hoops	4 Ribbons	Total	Notes
1	Russia; Ksenia Dudkina; Olga Ilina; Alina Makarenko; Karolina Sevastyanova	26.450	25.800	52.250	Q
2	Japan; Midori Kahata; Momoka Nagai; Sara Ogiso; Shiho Suzuki	23.000	22.900	45.900	Q
3	Egypt; Farida Sherif Eid; Jacinthe Tarek Eldeeb; Manar Khaled Mohamed Elgarf; Aicha Mohamed Tarek Niazi	22.375	19.275	41.650	Q
4	Canada; Katrina Cameron; Melodie Omidi; Anjelika Reznik; Victoria Reznik	20.850	20.300	41.150	Q
5	Singapore; Shing Eng Chia; Miki Erika Nomura; Yi Lin Phaan; Kwee Peng Ann Sim	19.600	19.550	39.150	R
6	Australia; Soriah Maclean; Fotini Panselinos; Morgan Turner; Summer Walker	18.650	18.500	37.150	R

== Final ==
Rank	Team	4 Hoops	4 Ribbons	Total
Gold medal	Russia; Ksenia Dudkina; Olga Ilina; Alina Makarenko; Karolina Sevastyanova	26.275	26.075	52.350
Silver medal	Egypt; Farida Sherif Eid; Jacinthe Tarek Eldeeb; Manar Khaled Mohamed Elgarf; Aicha Mohamed Tarek Niazi	23.000	22.275	45.275
Bronze medal	Canada; Katrina Cameron; Melodie Omidi; Anjelika Reznik; Victoria Reznik	21.775	21.650	43.425
4	Japan; Midori Kahata; Momoka Nagai; Sara Ogiso; Shiho Suzuki	21.100	21.375	42.475
