= Akbota Kalimzhanova =

Kazakhstani rhythmic gymnast

Akbota Kalimzhanova (born 3 March 1993) is a Kazakhstani rhythmic gymnast.

She competed at the 2010 World Rhythmic Gymnastics Championships, 2011 World Rhythmic Gymnastics Championships, and 2013 World Rhythmic Gymnastics Championships.
