= Svitlana Prokopova =

Ukrainian rhythmic gymnast (born 1993)

- Full name: Svitlana Serhiïvna Prokopova
- Born: 3 January 1993 (age 33) Donetsk, Ukraine
- Height: 5 ft 8.5 in (174.0 cm)

Gymnastics career
- Discipline: Rhythmic gymnastics
- Country represented: Ukraine; (2010-2014)
- College team: Deriugins School
- Head coach: Albina Deriugina
- Assistant coach: Iryna Deriugina
- Retired: yes
Medal record
Representing Ukraine
Group Rhythmic Gymnastics
World Championships
Bronze medal – third place	2013 Kyiv	10 Clubs
Summer Universiade
Silver medal – second place	2013 Kazan	Group All-around
Bronze medal – third place	2013 Kazan	10 Clubs
Bronze medal – third place	2013 Kazan	2 Ribbon + 3 Balls
Gymnasiade
Silver medal – second place	2009 Doha	Group all-around

Svitlana Serhiïvna Prokopova (Ukrainian: Світлана Сергіївна Прокопова; born 3 January 1993) is a retired Ukrainian group rhythmic gymnast and current coach of US National team.

== Career ==
Svitlana was a member of national group from 2010 to 2014. She represented Ukraine at the 2010 World Championships in Moscow, Russia, where she took 13th place in Group All-around and did not advance into any apparatus finals. At the 2011 World Championships in Montpellier, France, she and her teammates were 7th in Group All-around.

Prokopova participated at the 2012 Summer Olympics in London and took 5th place in Group All-around Final, together with Olena Dmytrash, Yevgeniya Gomon, Valeriia Gudym, Viktoriya Lenyshyn and Viktoria Mazur.

In 2013, she was part of the group that won silver medal in Group All-around at 2013 Summer Universiade in Kazan, Russia. They also won two bronze medals in apparatus final. She competed at the 2013 World Rhythmic Gymnastics Championships in Kyiv, Ukraine, winning the silver medal in the 10 clubs final. She finished 15th in Group All-around. She made her last appearance at the 2014 European Championships in Baku, Azerbaijan, where her group took 8th place in Group All-around and 3 + 2 apparatus final.

== Personal life ==
After retirement from competitive sport, she moved to United States and founded Pacific Stars Rhythmic Academy in San Diego, California, where she is currently the head coach. Her notable trainees include Megan Chu, Alicia Liu and Sarah Mariotti.
