= Yang Ye (gymnast) =

Chinese rhythmic gymnast

Personal information
- Nationality: Chinese
- Born: 26 May 1994 (age 32)

Sport
- Sport: Rhythmic gymnastics
Medal record
Representing China
Asian Championships
Gold medal – first place	2013 Tashkent	team all-around

Yang Ye (Chinese: 杨晔; pinyin: Yáng Yė; born 26 May 1994) is a Chinese rhythmic gymnast. She competed in the group rhythmic gymnastics competition at the 2016 Summer Olympics, where the team was eliminated in the qualification round. She suffered a hip injury during the qualification round and had a surgery in September 2016 in Beijing.

In 2014 she was named an Elite Athlete of International Class by the General Administration of Sport of the People's Republic of China.
