= Ksenia Dudkina =

Russian rhythmic gymnast

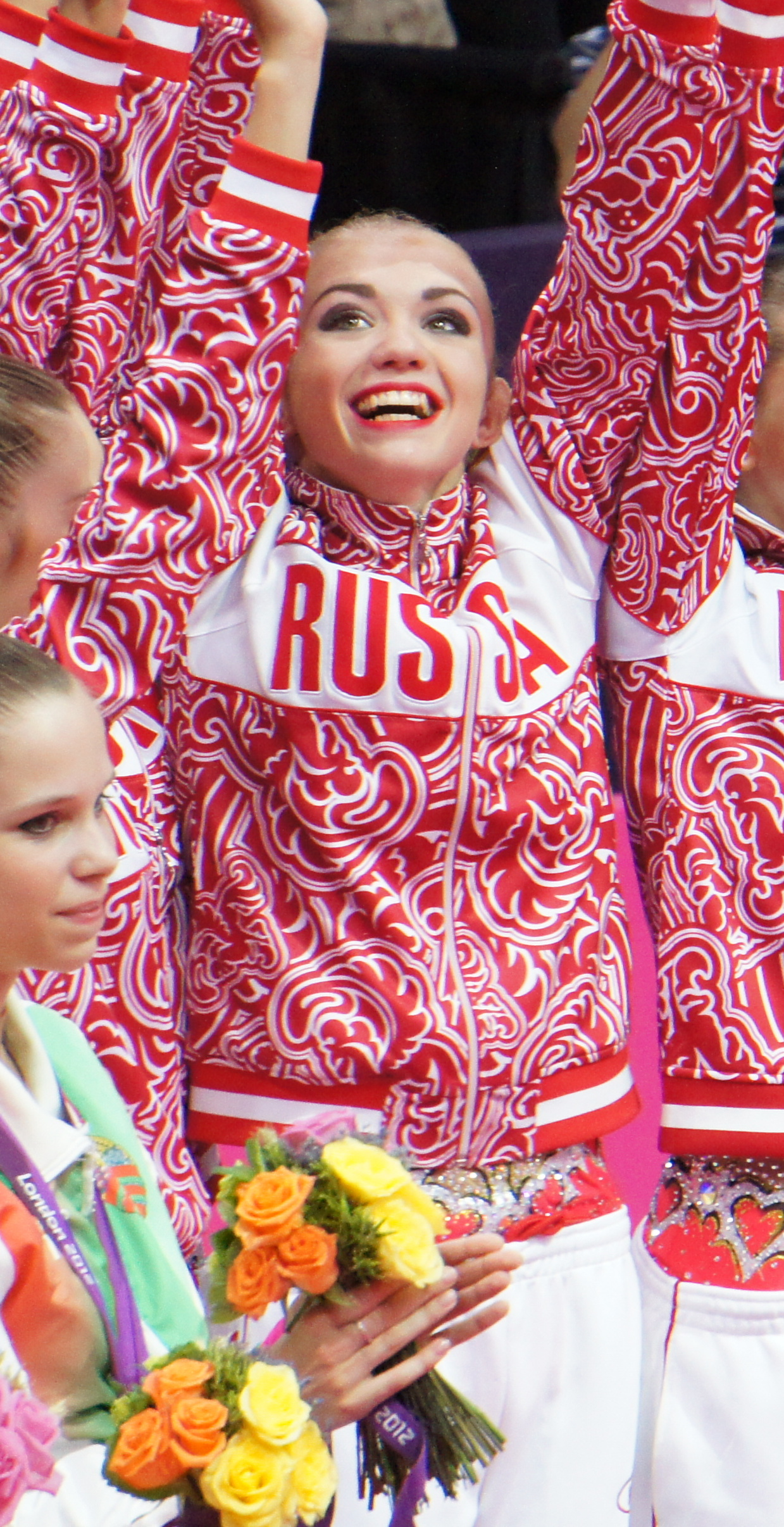
- Dudkina in 2012

Personal information
- Full name: Ksenia Pavlovna Dudkina
- Born: 25 February 1995 (age 31) Omsk, Omsk Oblast, Russia

Gymnastics career
- Discipline: Rhythmic gymnastics
- Country represented: Russia
- Club: Gazprom
- Gym: Novogorsk
- Head coach: Irina Viner
- Assistant coaches: Elena Arais & Vera Shtelbaums
- Retired: 2013
Medal record
Group rhythmic gymnastics
Representing Russia
Olympic Games
Gold medal – first place	2012 London	Group All-around
World Championships
Gold medal – first place	2011 Montpellier	5 Balls
Gold medal – first place	2013 Kyiv	2 Ribbon/3 Balls
Silver medal – second place	2011 Montpellier	Group All-around
Bronze medal – third place	2013 Kyiv	Group All-around
European Championships
Gold medal – first place	2012 Nizhny Novgorod	Group All-around
Gold medal – first place	2012 Nizhny Novgorod	5 Balls
Summer Universiade
Gold medal – first place	2013 Kazan	Group All-around
Gold medal – first place	2013 Kazan	10 Clubs
Gold medal – first place	2013 Kazan	2 Ribbon + 3 Balls
Youth Olympic Games
Gold medal – first place	2010 Singapore	Group All-around

Ksenia Pavlovna Dudkina (Russian: Ксения Павловна Дудкина; born 25 February 1995) is a Russian group rhythmic gymnast. She is the 2012 Olympics Group All-around champion, the 2011 World Group All-around silver medalist, 2013 World Group All-around bronze medalist, 2012 European Group All-around gold medalist, (2013, 2012) World Cup Final Group All-around champion and 2010 Youth Olympic Games Group All-around champion.

== Career ==
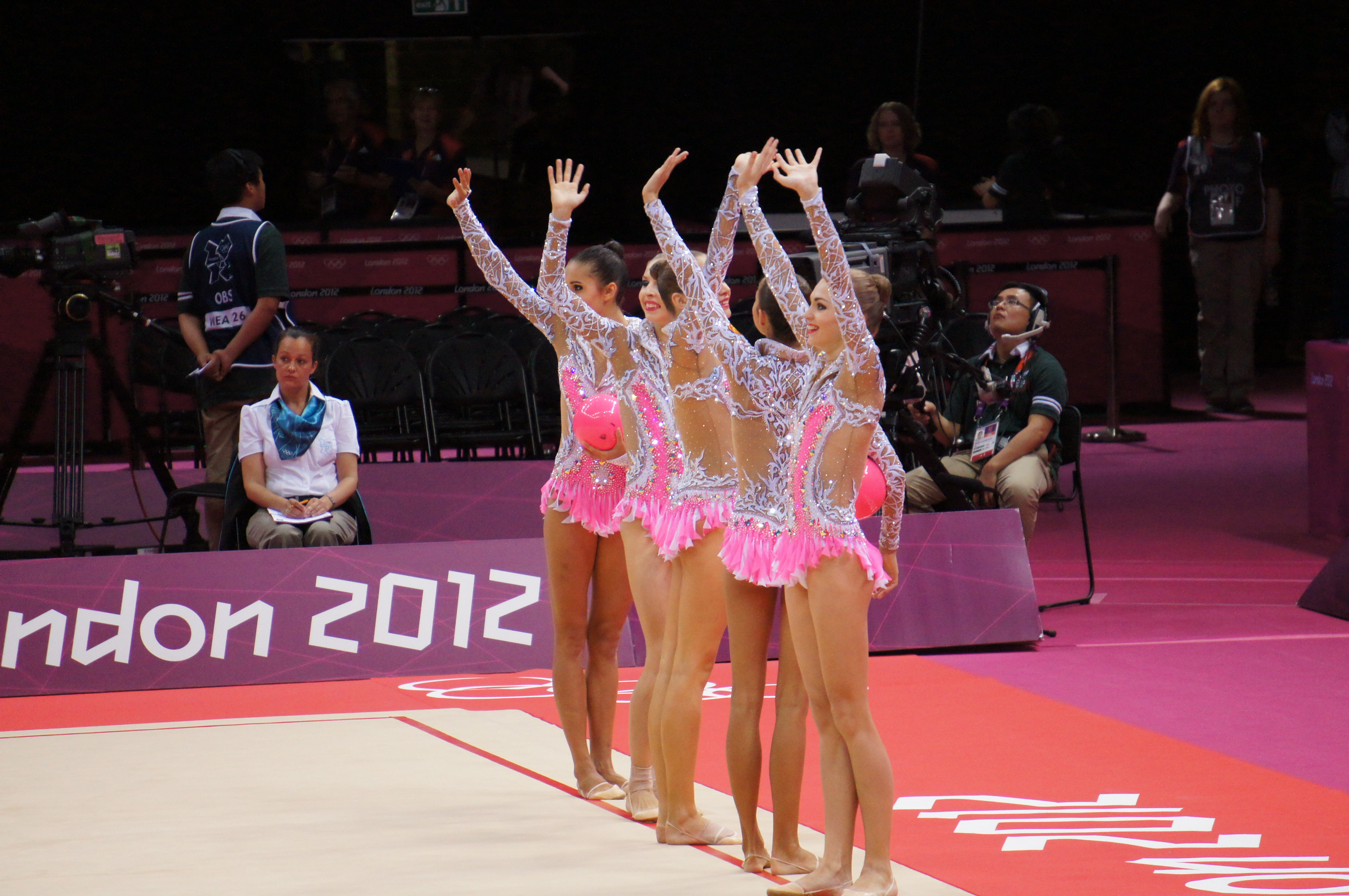
Ksenia Dudkina (first right) in 5 Balls final at the 2012 Summer Olympics

Dudkina was trained by Elena Arais (daughter of Vera Shtelbaums, who is Evgenia Kanaeva's personal coach) before she started competing in group. Dudkina became an Honored Master of Sports of Russia in 2011.

Dudkina is from Omsk Oblast, also home to two-time Olympic champion Evgenia Kanaeva, 2004 Olympic silver medalist Irina Tchachina, Soviet World champion Galima Shugurova, and 1987 World Champion Tatiana Druchinina. Dudkina like Kanaeva is an honorary citizen of Omsk.

As a junior, she and the Russian Group won the gold medal at the 2010 Youth Olympic Games. She competed as member of the senior Russian Group at the 2011 World Championships. She was part of the golden winning Russian Group at the 2012 European Championships and at the World Cup Final in Minsk.

Dudkina won a gold medal at the 2012 Summer Olympics in the group all-around event together with other group members (Uliana Donskova, Anastasia Bliznyuk, Alina Makarenko, Anastasia Nazarenko, Karolina Sevastyanova) For six months leading up to the Olympic Games, the Russian gymnasts only ate buckwheat in their diet. She was one of the youngest member of the Russian Group in the 2012 Olympics at only 17 years old.

Dudkina and the rest of the Russian Group returned to competition at the 2013 Moscow Grand Prix where they won the all-around, at the Thiais Grand Prix they also won the all-around gold medal as well as in the event finals. They competed at their first World Cup competition of the season in Lisbon, Portugal where they won bronze in all-around and won the gold medal in 10 clubs and 2 ribbons/3 balls final. At the Sofia World Cup they won the silver medal in all-around and gold in 2 ribbons/3 balls final. At the Minsk World Cup they won gold in all-around, silver in 2 ribbons/3 balls and bronze in 10 clubs. Dudkina and the rest Russian Group won all the gold medals at the 2013 Summer Universiade in All-around, 10 clubs and 2 ribbons/3 balls. The Russian Group won the gold medals in Group All-around, 10 clubs and 2 ribbons/3 balls at the 2013 World Cup Final in St. Petersburg, Russia. Dudkina and her Russian teammates won the Group All-around bronze medal at the 2013 World Championships, they won gold in 2 Ribbon + 3 Balls final. Dudkina along with rest of the remaining Russian Group Olympians completed their careers after the World Championships. Irina Viner has stated about their dismissal and retirements: "We have made drastic changes in the composition of the group. All the girls, who a year ago at the Olympic Games were the first after the World Cup series had to say goodbye to the sport. They did not show in Kiev what could and should have been shown. The "star disease" should not be left on the carpet. And I always say that as long as you're standing on a pedestal - you're a winner, but as soon as you had gone down from it- you're no one to call you in any way".

== Detailed Olympic results ==
Year	Competition description	Location	Music	Apparatus	Rank	Score-Final	Rank	Score-Qualifying
2012	Olympics	London		All-around	1st	57.000	1st	56.375
2012	Olympics	London	Giselle by Adolphe Adams	5 Balls	1st	28.700	1st	28.375
2012	Olympics	London	( Knock on Wood / Tough Lover / At Last / Oye ) by Safri Duo / Christina Aguilera / Kenny G / Gloria Estefan	3 Ribbons / 2 Hoops	1st	28.300	1st	28.000

== See also ==
- List of Youth Olympic Games gold medalists who won Olympic gold medals
