= Midori Kahata =

Japanese rhythmic gymnast

- Born: 1 September 1995 (age 31)

Gymnastics career
- Discipline: Rhythmic gymnastics
- Country represented: Japan (2013)
Medal record
Asian Championships
Gold medal – first place	2013 Tashkent	10 clubs
Silver medal – second place	2013 Tashkent	Group all-around
Silver medal – second place	2013 Tashkent	3 balls + 2 ribbons

Midori Kahata (加畑 碧, Kahata Midori; born 1 September 1995) was a Japanese group rhythmic gymnast. She represented her nation at international competitions.

She participated at the 2010 Summer Youth Olympics. She competed at world championships, including at the 2013 World Rhythmic Gymnastics Championships.
