= Zhang Ling (gymnast) =

Chinese rhythmic gymnast

Personal information
- Nationality: Chinese
- Born: Jinhua, China
- Height: 172 cm (5 ft 8 in)
- Weight: 51 kg (112 lb)

Sport
- Sport: Rhythmic gymnastics
Medal record
Representing China
Asian Championships
Gold medal – first place	2013 Tashkent	team all-around

Zhang Ling is a Chinese rhythmic gymnast. She competed in the group rhythmic gymnastics competition at the 2016 Summer Olympics, where the team was eliminated in the qualification round.
