= Alina Makarenko =

Russian rhythmic gymnast

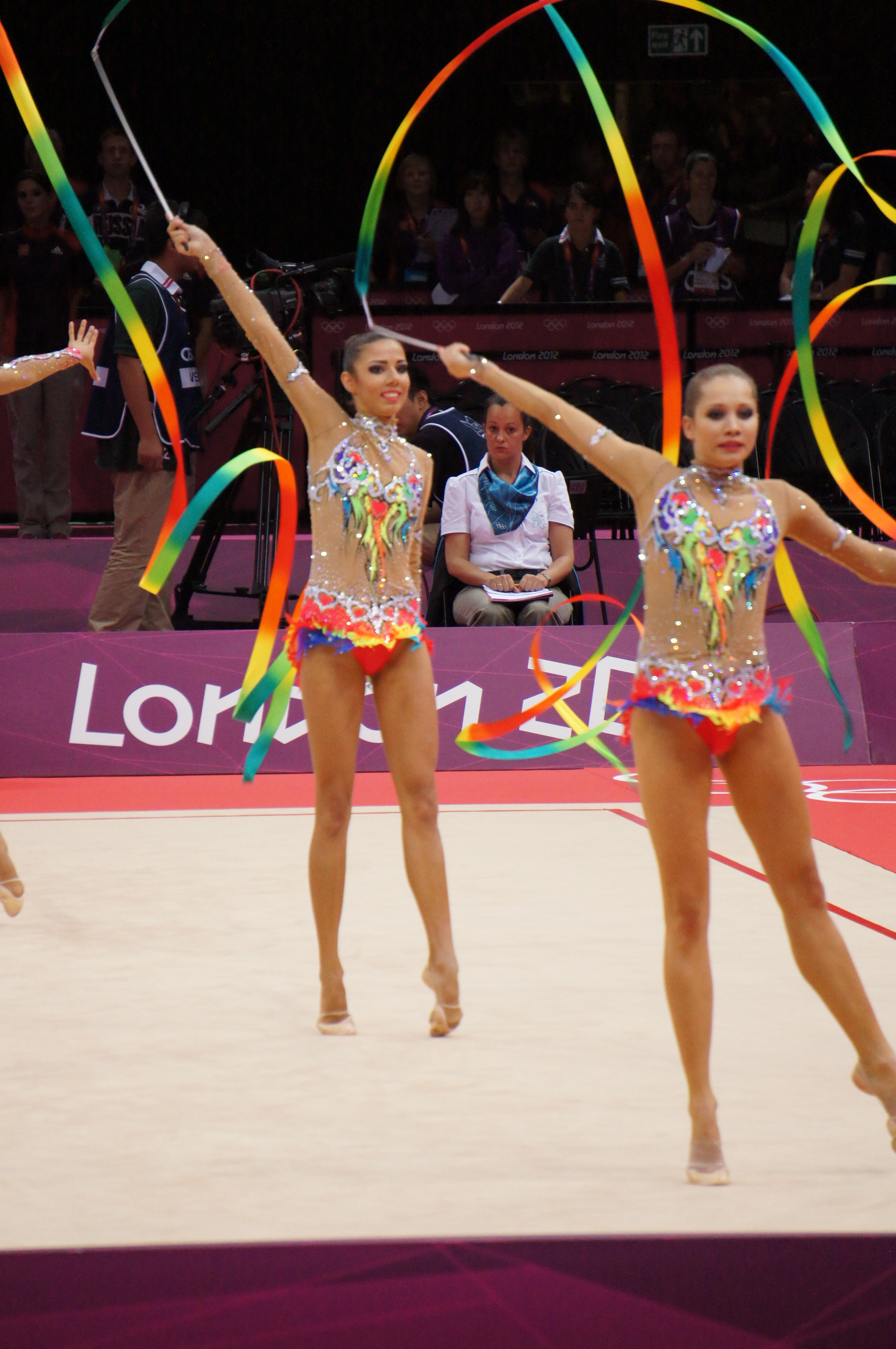
- Makarenko (left) at the 3 Ribbons + 2 Hoops final in 2012 Summer Olympics

Personal information
- Full name: Alina Andreevna Makarenko
- Born: 14 January 1995 (age 31) Elista, Kalmykia, Russia

Gymnastics career
- Discipline: Rhythmic gymnastics
- Country represented: Russia
- Head coach: Irina Viner
- Assistant coach: Anna Shumilova
- Former coaches: Tatiana Sergaeva & Inna Bystrova
- Retired: 2013
Medal record
Representing Russia
Group Rhythmic Gymnastics
Olympic Games
Gold medal – first place	2012 London	Group All-around
World Championships
Gold medal – first place	2011 Montpellier	5 Balls
Silver medal – second place	2011 Montpellier	Group All-around
European Championships
Gold medal – first place	2012 Nizhny Novgorod	Group All-around
Gold medal – first place	2012 Nizhny Novgorod	5 Balls
Youth Olympic Games
Gold medal – first place	2010 Singapore	Group All-around

Alina Andreevna Makarenko (Russian: Алина Андреевна Макаренко; born 14 January 1995) is a Russian group rhythmic gymnast. She is the 2012 Olympics Group All-around champion, the 2011 World Group All-around silver medalist, 2012 European Group All-around gold medalist and 2010 Youth Olympic Games Group All-around champion.

== Career ==
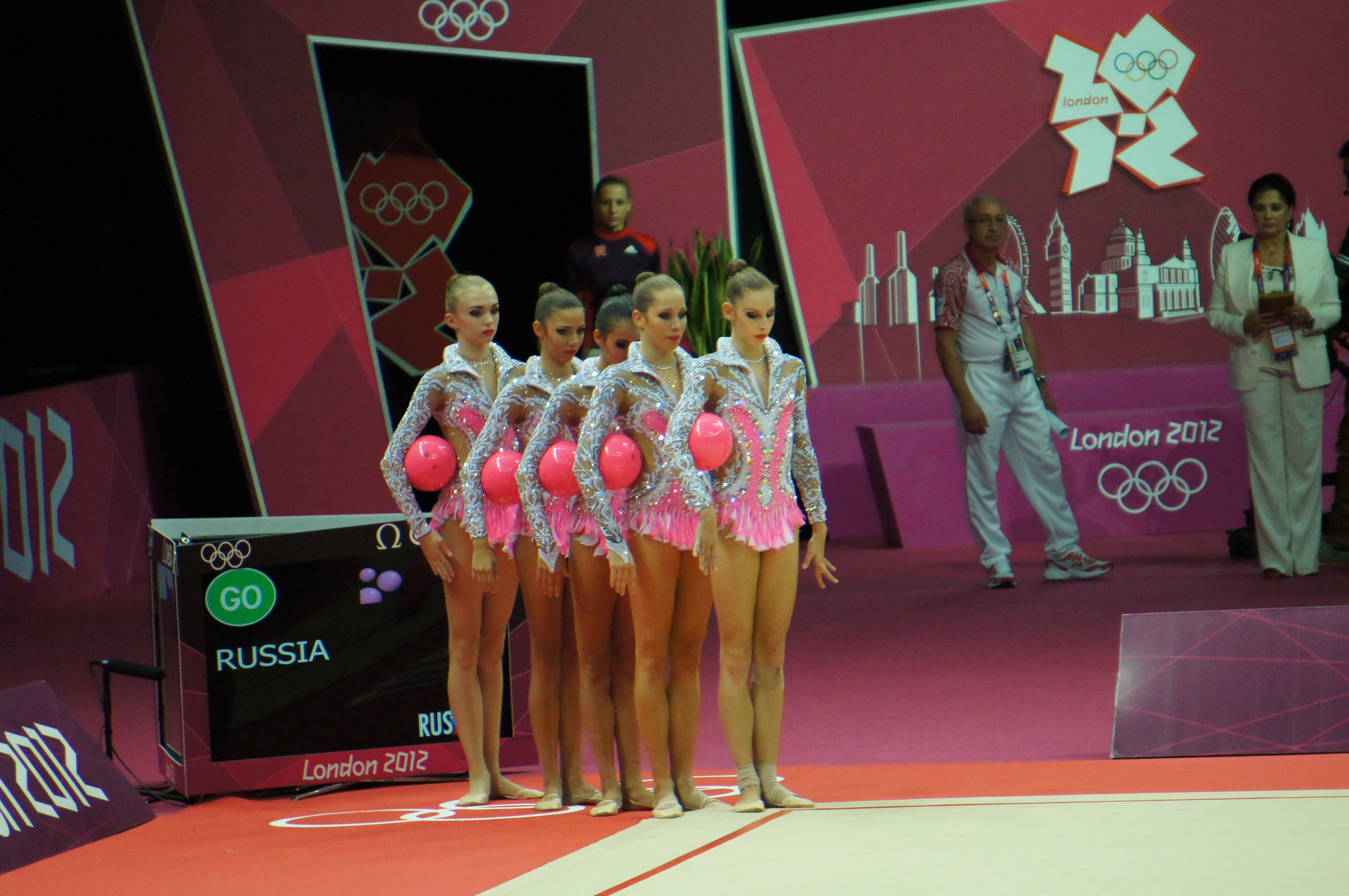
(L-R) Ksenia Dudkina, Alina Makarenko, Anastasia Nazarenko, Uliana Donskova and Anastasia Bliznyuk in 5 Balls final at the 2012 Summer Olympics

As a junior, Makarenko competed as an individual gymnast but switched to competing in the Russian Group under Russian Head Coach Irina Viner. She and the Russian Junior Group won the gold medal at the 2010 Youth Olympic Games. She was again part of the group that competed at the 2011 World Championships.

Makarenko was a member of the Russian Group that competed at the 2011 World Championships. She was part of the gold medal-winning Russian Group at the 2012 European Championships and at the World Cup Final in Minsk. She won a gold medal at the 2012 Summer Olympics in the group all-around event together with other group members (Uliana Donskova, Anastasia Bliznyuk, Ksenia Dudkina, Anastasia Nazarenko, Karolina Sevastyanova).

For six months leading up to the Olympic Games, the Russian gymnasts only ate buckwheat in their diet.

Makarenko and the rest of the Russian Group returned to competition at the 2013 Moscow Grand Prix where they won the all-around, at the Thiais Grand Prix they also won the all-around gold medal as well as in the event finals. They competed at their first World Cup competition of the season in Lisbon, Portugal where they won bronze in all-around and won the gold medal in 10 clubs and 2 ribbons/3 balls final. She suffered a knee injury and was temporarily replaced by Diana Borisova in the Russian Group.

Struggling with injuries, Makarenko finally retired from competitive gymnastics.

In 2021, she started coaching Russian junior group. They won three gold medals at the 2021 Junior European Championships in Varna, Bulgaria.

== Detailed Olympic results ==
Year	Competition Description	Location	Music	Apparatus	Rank	Score-Final	Rank	Score-Qualifying
2012	Olympics	London		All-around	1st	57.000	1st	56.375
2012	Olympics	London	Giselle by Adolphe Adams	5 Balls	1st	28.700	1st	28.375
2012	Olympics	London	( Knock on Wood / Tough Lover / At Last / Oye ) by Safri Duo / Christina Aguilera / Kenny G / Gloria Estefan	3 Ribbons / 2 Hoops	1st	28.300	1st	28.000

== See also ==
- List of Youth Olympic Games gold medalists who won Olympic gold medals
