= Uliana Donskova =

Russian rhythmic gymnast

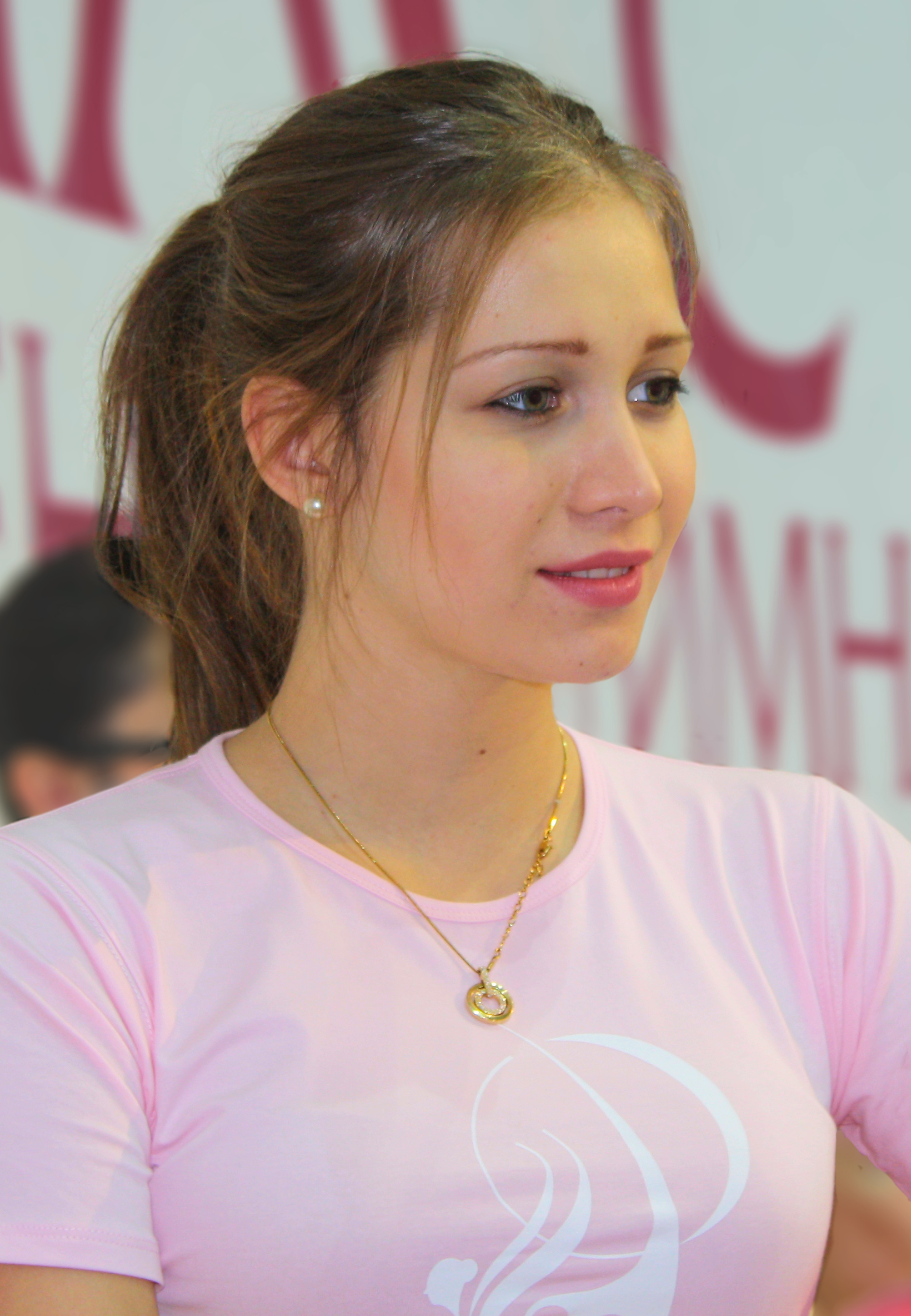
- Donskova at the 2012 RG New Year's master class

Personal information
- Full name: Uliana Vyacheslavovna Donskova
- Alternative name: Juliana Donskova
- Born: 24 August 1992 (age 34) Kamensk-Shakhtinsky, Rostov Oblast, Russia

Gymnastics career
- Discipline: Rhythmic gymnastics
- Country represented: Russia
- Gym: Novogorsk
- Head coach: Irina Viner
- Retired: 2012
Medal record
Group rhythmic gymnastics
Representing Russia
Olympic Games
Gold medal – first place	2012 London	Group All-around
World Championships
Gold medal – first place	2009 Mie	5 Hoops
Gold medal – first place	2010 Moscow	3 Ribbons/ 2 Ropes
Gold medal – first place	2010 Moscow	5 Balls
Gold medal – first place	2011 Montpellier	5 Balls
Silver medal – second place	2011 Montpellier	Group All-around
Bronze medal – third place	2009 Mie	Group All-around
Bronze medal – third place	2009 Mie	3 Ribbons/ 2 Ropes
Bronze medal – third place	2010 Moscow	Group All-around
European Championships
Gold medal – first place	2010 Bremen	Group All-around
Gold medal – first place	2010 Bremen	5 hoops
Gold medal – first place	2010 Bremen	3 Ribbons/ 2 Ropes
Gold medal – first place	2012 N.Novgorod	Group All-around
Gold medal – first place	2012 N.Novgorod	5 Balls
Junior European Championships
Gold medal – first place	2007 Baku	10 Clubs
World Cup Final
Gold medal – first place	2012 Minsk	Group All-around
Gold medal – first place	2012 Minsk	5 Balls
Gold medal – first place	2012 Minsk	3 Ribbons/ 2 Hoops

Uliana Vyacheslavovna Donskova (Russian: Ульяна Вячеславовна Донскова; born 24 August 1992) is a Russian group rhythmic gymnast. She is the 2012 Olympics Group All-around champion, the 2011 World Group All-around silver medalist, the 2010 World Group All-around bronze medalist, the 2012 European Group All-around gold medalist and the 2010 European Group All-around gold medalist.

== Career ==
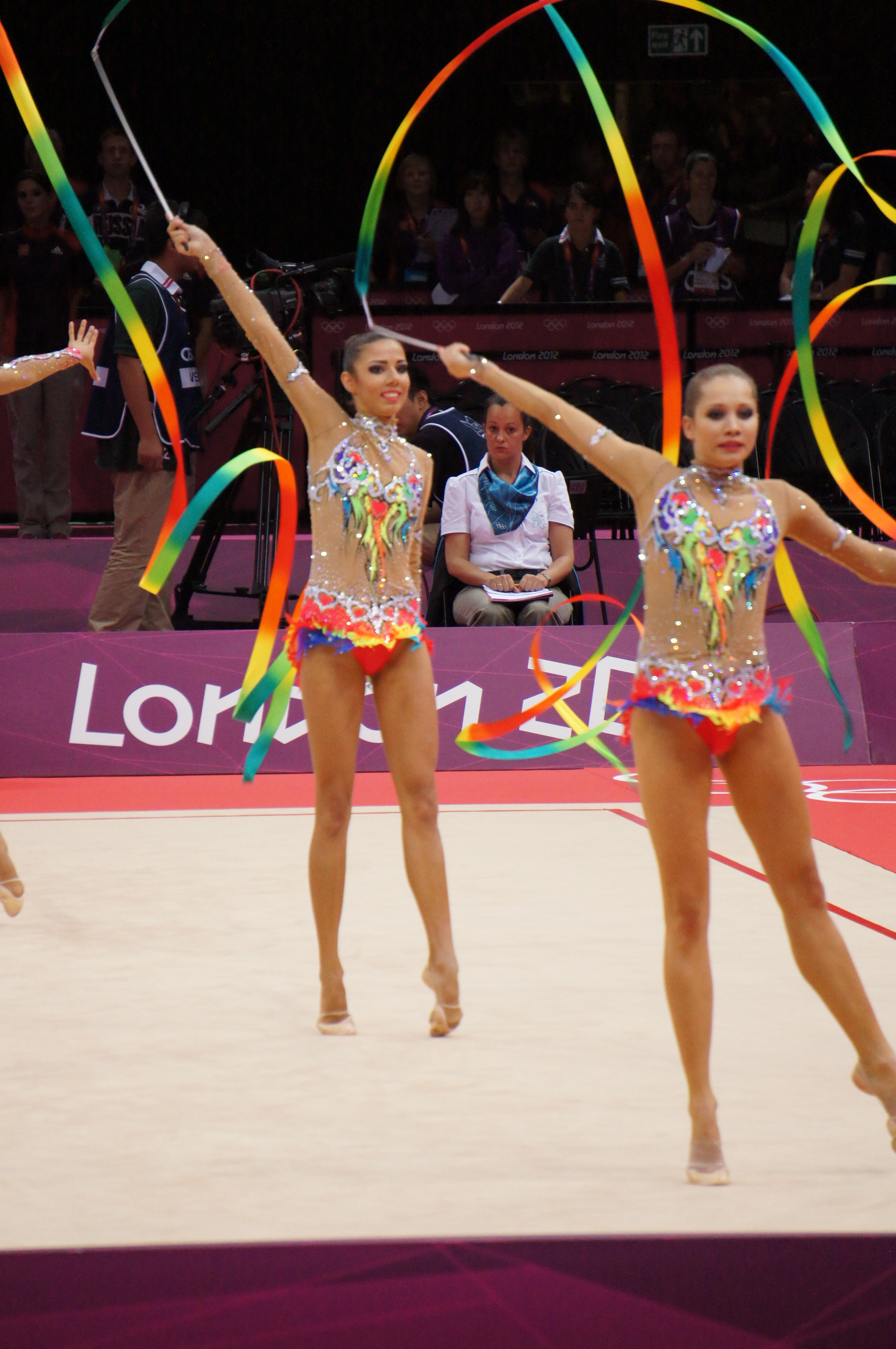
Donskova (right) at the 3 Ribbons + 2 Hoops final in 2012 Summer Olympics

Donskova started training in gymnastics when she was five years old. She started competing with the Russian Group in 2007. They won gold medal in 10 Clubs Final at the 2007 European Championships in Baku. She competed in her first World Championship on August 12, 2009, in Japan, in Mie. There she together with the other Russian group received a gold medal and two bronze medals. She was again part of the Russian Group at the European Championships in Bremen and at the 2010 and 2011 World Championships.

She won the gold medal at the 2012 Summer Olympics in the group all-around event together with other group members (Ksenia Dudkina, Anastasia Bliznyuk, Alina Makarenko, Anastasia Nazarenko, Karolina Sevastyanova). Donskova admitted the group believed they would win gold in London "It was a long time with hard work. We believed in our victory, but we didn't allow ourselves to relax. We didn't think about the medal".

It was Russia's 4th consecutive win in the Group since the 2000 Summer Olympics. Donskova said: "We had no idea that we were going for four in a row." When asked to explain the secret of Russia's success in rhythmic gymnastics, she added: "We're born as rhythmic gymnasts." For six months leading up to the Olympic Games, the Russian gymnasts ate only buckwheat. Donskova retired from rhythmic gymnastics after the 2012 Olympics.

== Personal life ==
Donskova is a student at the Lesgaft National State University of Physical Culture, Sport & Health in Saint Petersburg, Russia. On June 25, 2014, Donskova married former CSKA Moskva Ice Hockey player Ruben Begunts. The couple had their first child in August 2015.

== Detailed Olympic results ==
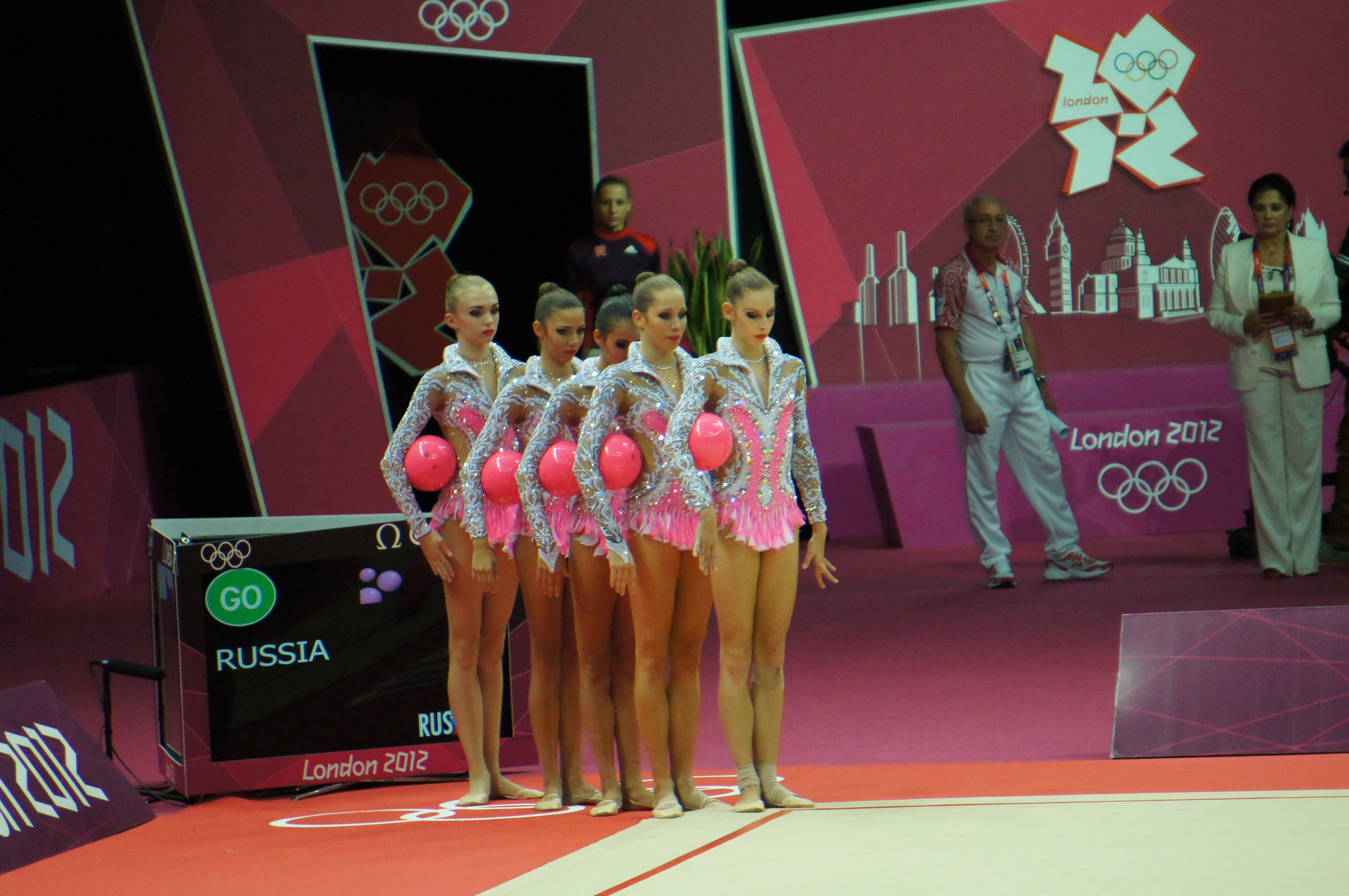
(L-R) Ksenia Dudkina, Alina Makarenko, Anastasia Nazarenko, Uliana Donskova and Anastasia Bliznyuk in 5 Balls final at the 2012 Summer Olympics

Year	Competition Description	Location	Music	Apparatus	Rank	Score-Final	Rank	Score-Qualifying
2012	Olympics	London		All-around	1st	57.000	1st	56.375
2012	Olympics	London	Giselle by Adolphe Adams	5 Balls	1st	28.700	1st	28.375
2012	Olympics	London	( Knock on Wood / Tough Lover / At Last / Oye ) by Safri Duo / Christina Aguilera / Kenny G / Gloria Estefan	3 Ribbons / 2 Hoops	1st	28.300	1st	28.000
