= Karolina Sevastyanova =

Russian rhythmic gymnast

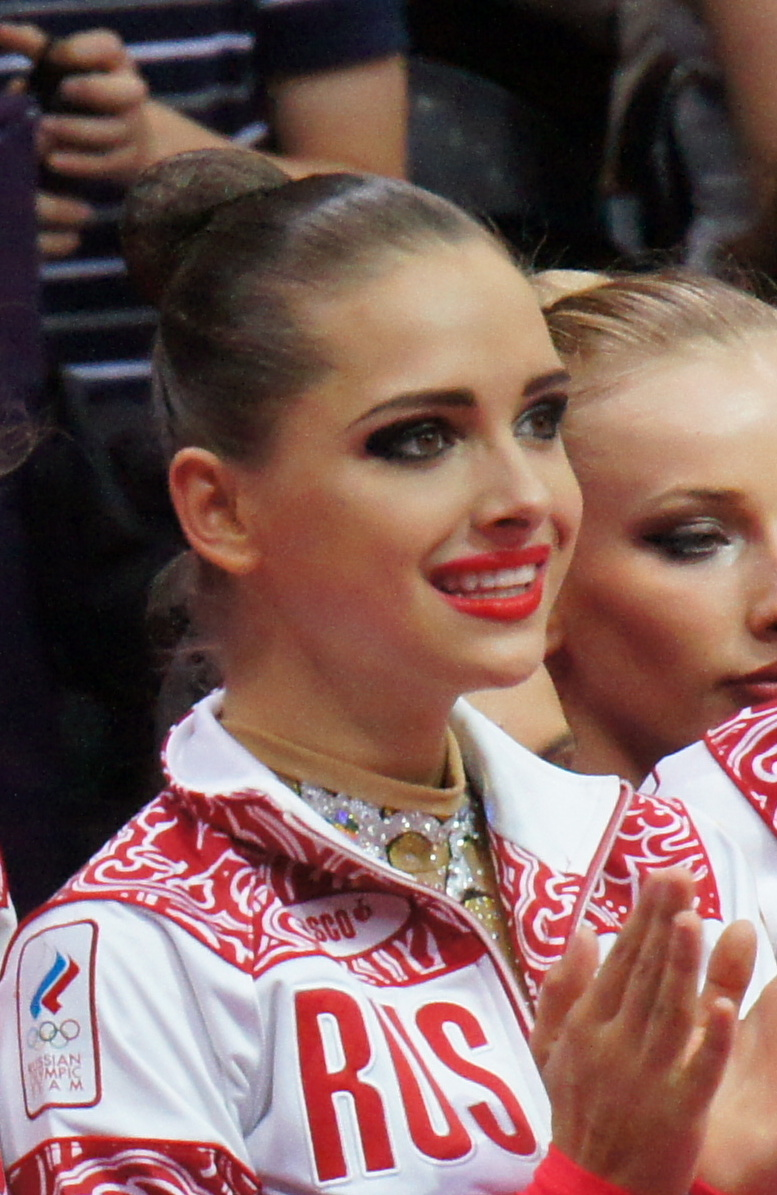
- Sevastyanova at the 2012 Summer Olympics

Personal information
- Full name: Karolina Andreyevna Sevastyanova
- Born: 25 April 1995 (age 31) Kyiv, Ukraine

Gymnastics career
- Discipline: Rhythmic gymnastics
- Country represented: Russia
- Gym: Novogorsk
- Head coach: Irina Viner
- Retired: 2012
Medal record
Representing Russia
Group Rhythmic Gymnastics
Olympic Games
Gold medal – first place	2012 London	Group All-around
European Championships
Gold medal – first place	2012 N. Novgorod	Group All-around
Gold medal – first place	2012 N. Novgorod	5 Balls
Youth Olympic Games
Gold medal – first place	2010 Singapore	Group All-around

Karolina Andreyevna Sevastyanova (Russian: Каролина Андреевна Севастьянова; born 25 April 1995) is a Russian group rhythmic gymnast. She is the 2012 Olympics Group All-around champion, 2012 European Group All-around champion and 2010 Youth Olympic Games Group All-around champion.

== Career ==
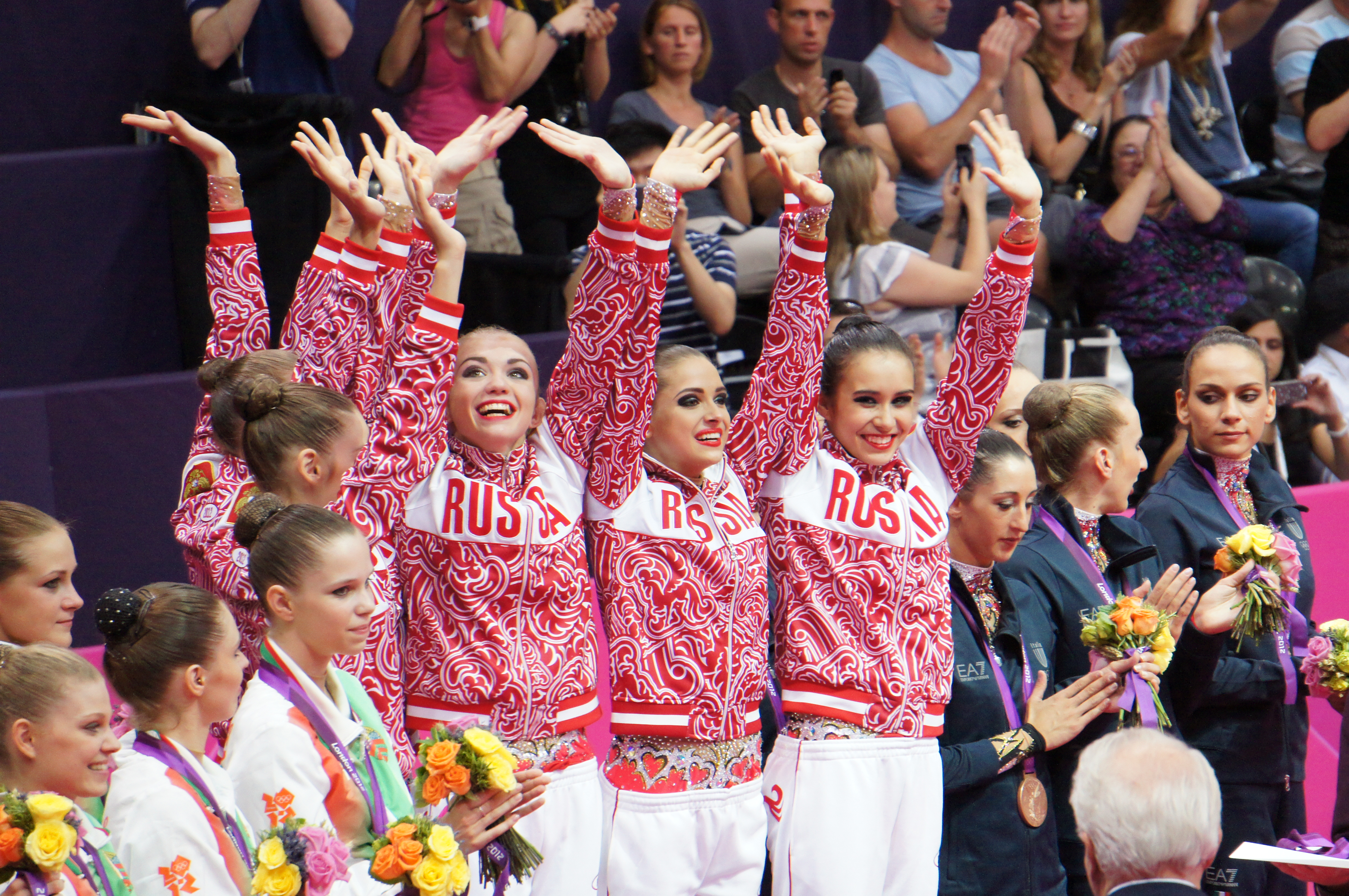
Sevastyanova(center) with the Russian Group at the 2012 Summer Olympics Group All-around podium

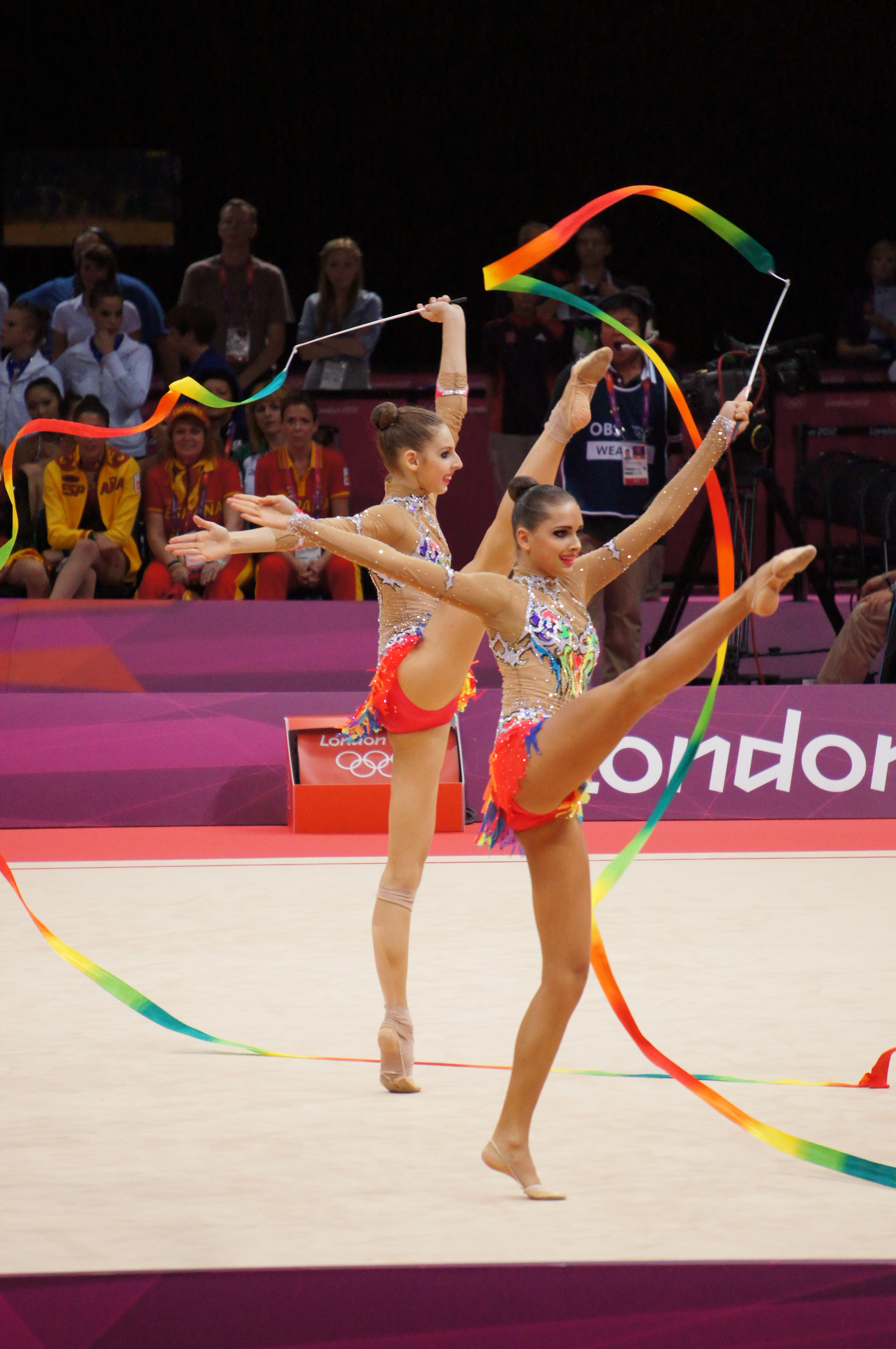
Bliznyuk and Sevastyanova (right) in the 3 Ribbons + 2 Hoops final in 2012 Summer Olympics

Sevastyanova competed as an individual gymnast on the junior level, appearing in international competitions. She competed in Miss Valentine 2005 in Estonia with Margarita Mamun. Later, she started competing with the Russian Group.

Sevastyanova was a member of the Russian Junior Group that won the gold medal at the 2010 Youth Olympic Games. In 2012, she was selected to compete with the Russian Senior Group as a replacement for the injured Natalia Pichuzhkina. They won the gold medal at the 2012 European Championships and at the World Cup Final in Minsk.

With Uliana Donskova, Anastasia Bliznyuk, Alina Makarenko, Anastasia Nazarenko, and Ksenia Dudkina, Sevastyanova won a gold medal at the 2012 Summer Olympics in the group all-around event. They ate only buckwheat for six months leading up to the Olympic Games. Sevastyanova was voted the most beautiful female athlete from the CIS countries participating at the 2012 Olympics. 17,200 people from Russia, Ukraine, Belarus, Kazakhstan, Moldova, Armenia, Azerbaijan, Uzbekistan and Kyrgyzstan took part in the survey. Sevastyanova retired from competition at the age of 17 following the event. She planned to get her college degree at Moscow State University and explore working as a TV presenter or host.

Sevastyanova appeared in the cover of the Russian edition of Maxim magazine in February 2015.

== Detailed Olympic results ==
Year	Competition Description	Location	Music	Apparatus	Rank	Score-Final	Rank	Score-Qualifying
2012	Olympics	London		All-around	1st	57.000	1st	56.375
2012	Olympics	London	Giselle by Adolphe Adams	5 Balls	1st	28.700	1st	28.375
2012	Olympics	London	( Knock on Wood / Tough Lover / At Last / Oye ) by Safri Duo / Christina Aguilera / Kenny G / Gloria Estefan	3 Ribbons / 2 Hoops	1st	28.300	1st	28.000

== See also ==
- List of Youth Olympic Games gold medalists who won Olympic gold medals
