= Anastasia Nazarenko =

Russian rhythmic gymnast (born 1993)

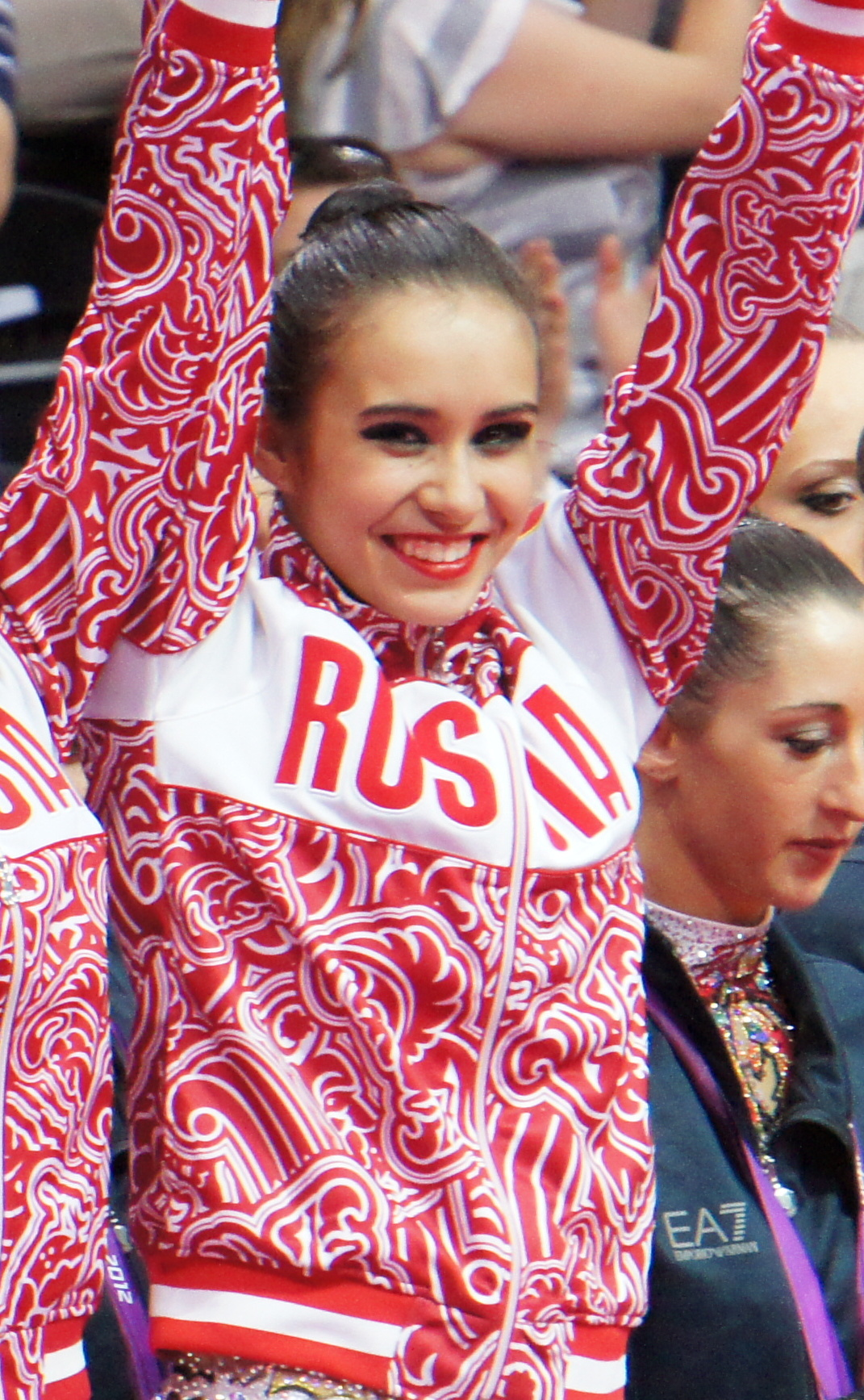
- Nazarenko at the 2012 Summer Olympics

Personal information
- Full name: Anastasia Konstantinovna Nazarenko
- Born: 17 January 1993 (age 33) Kaliningrad, Russia

Gymnastics career
- Discipline: Rhythmic gymnastics
- Country represented: Russia (2009-2013)
- Gym: Novogorsk
- Head coach: Irina Viner
- Retired: 2013
Medal record
Group rhythmic gymnastics
Representing Russia
Olympic Games
Gold medal – first place	2012 London	Group All-around
World Championships
Gold medal – first place	2011 Montpellier	5 Balls
Gold medal – first place	2013 Kyiv	3 Balls + 2 Ribbons
Silver medal – second place	2011 Montpellier	Group All-around
Bronze medal – third place	2013 Kyiv	Group All-around
European Championships
Gold medal – first place	2010 Bremen	Group All-around
Gold medal – first place	2010 Bremen	5 Hoops
Gold medal – first place	2010 Bremen	3 Ribbons + 2 Ropes
Summer Universiade
Gold medal – first place	2013 Kazan	Group All-around
Gold medal – first place	2013 Kazan	10 Clubs
Gold medal – first place	2013 Kazan	2 Ribbon + 3 Balls

Anastasia Konstantinovna Nazarenko (Russian: Анастасия Константиновна Назаренко; born 17 January 1993) is a Russian group rhythmic gymnast. She is the 2012 Olympics Group All-around champion, the 2011 World Group All-around silver medalist and the 2010 European Group All-around gold medalist.

== Career ==
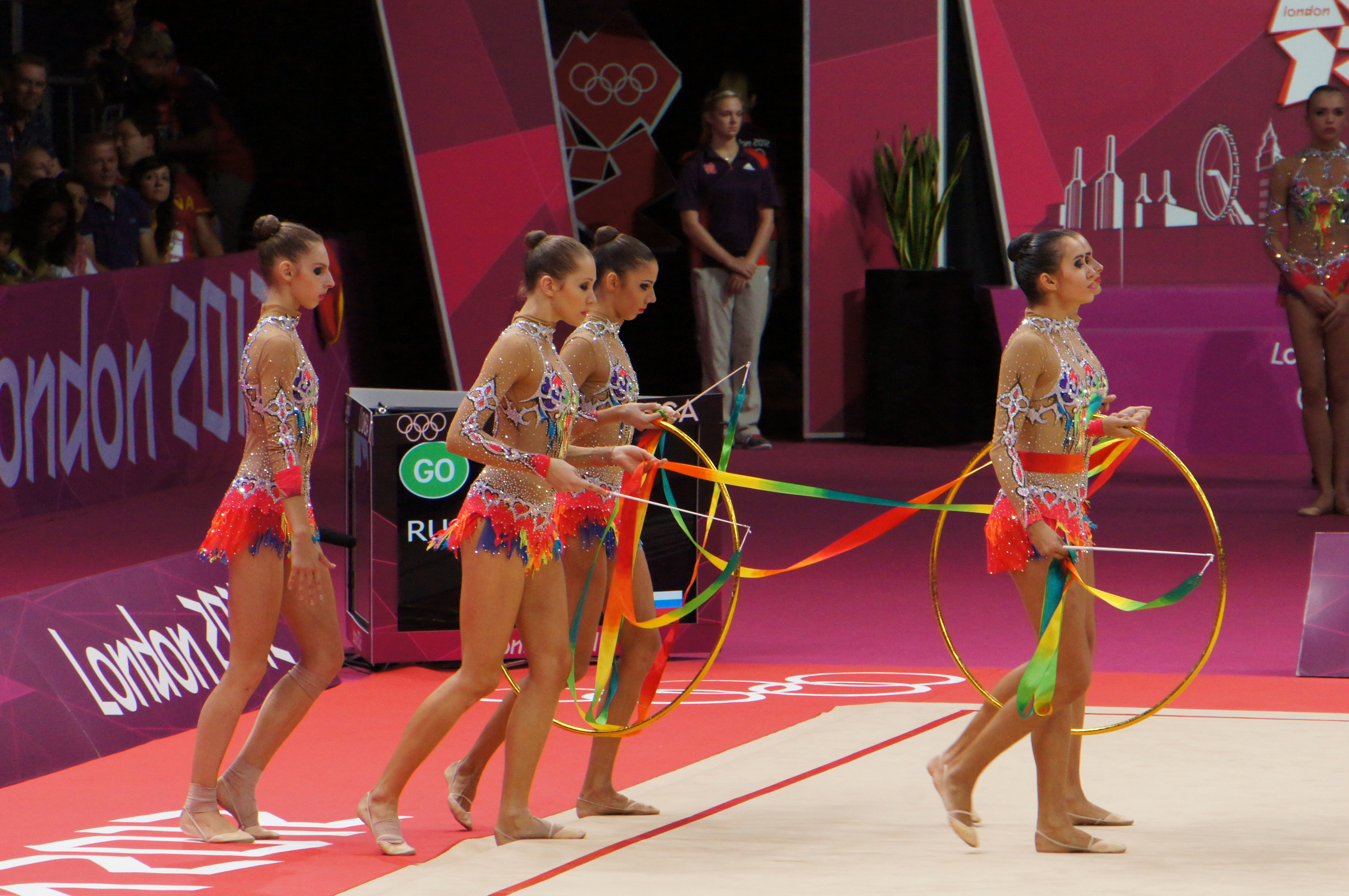
(L-R) Bliznyuk, Donskova, Makarenko, Nazarenko and Sevastyanova in 3 Ribbons + 2 Hoops final at the 2012 Summer Olympics

She competed at the 2011 World Championships in Montpellier, France, where she together with the other Russian group received a gold medal in 5 Balls final and silver medals in Group All-around and 3 Ribbons + 2 Hoops Final.

Nazarenko won a gold medal at the 2012 Summer Olympics in the group all-around event together with other group members (Uliana Donskova, Anastasia Bliznyuk, Alina Makarenko, Ksenia Dudkina, Karolina Sevastyanova). For six months leading up to the Olympic Games, the Russian gymnasts only ate buckwheat in their diet.

She returned to competition in the Russian Group at the 2013 Sofia World Cup where they won the silver medal in Group All-around and gold in 2 ribbons/3 balls final. At the Minsk World Cup they won another gold in Group All-around, silver in 2 ribbons/3 balls and bronze in 10 clubs. She and the rest Russian Group won all the gold medals at the 2013 Summer Universiade in All-around, 10 clubs and 2 ribbons/3 balls. The Russian Group won the gold medals in Group All-around, 10 clubs and 2 ribbons/3 balls at the 2013 World Cup Final in St. Petersburg, Russia. They also won the Group All-around bronze medal at the 2013 World Championships, they won gold in 2 Ribbon + 3 Balls final. Nastya along with rest of the remaining Russian Group Olympians terminated their careers after the World Championships. Irina Viner has stated about their dismissal and retirements: "We have made drastic changes in the composition of the group. All the girls, who a year ago at the Olympic Games were the first after the World Cup series had to say goodbye to the sport. They did not show in Kiev what could and should have been shown. The "star disease" should not be left on the carpet. And I always say that as long as you're standing on a pedestal - you're a winner, but as soon as you had gone down from it- you're no one to call you in any way".

== Detailed Olympic results ==
Year	Competition Description	Location	Music	Apparatus	Rank	Score-Final	Rank	Score-Qualifying
2012	Olympics	London		All-around	1st	57.000	1st	56.375
2012	Olympics	London	Giselle by Adolphe Adams	5 Balls	1st	28.700	1st	28.375
2012	Olympics	London	( Knock on Wood / Tough Lover / At Last / Oye ) by Safri Duo / Christina Aguilera / Kenny G / Gloria Estefan	3 Ribbons / 2 Hoops	1st	28.300	1st	28.000
