= Germany at the 2012 Summer Olympics =

- IOC code: GER
- NOC: German Olympic Sports Confederation
- Website: www.dosb.de (in German, English, and French)

in London
- Competitors: 392 in 23 sports
- Flag bearers: Natascha Keller (opening); Kristof Wilke (closing)
- Medals Ranked 6th: Gold 11 Silver 20 Bronze 13 Total 44

Summer Olympics appearances (overview)
- 1896; 1900; 1904; 1908; 1912; 1920–1924; 1928; 1932; 1936; 1948; 1952; 1956–1988; 1992; 1996; 2000; 2004; 2008; 2012; 2016; 2020; 2024; 2028

Other related appearances
- 1906 Intercalated Games –––– Saar (1952); United Team of Germany (1956–1964); East Germany (1968–1988); West Germany (1968–1988)

Germany competed at the 2012 Summer Olympics in London, from 27 July to 12 August 2012. This was the nation's sixth consecutive appearance at the Summer Olympics after its reunification in 1990. The German Olympic Sports Confederation (German: Deutscher Olympischer Sportbund, DOSB) sent the nation's smallest delegation to the Games since its reunification. A total of 392 athletes, 218 men and 174 women, competed in 23 sports, and were nominated by DOSB on four occasions.

Germany left London with a total of 44 medals (11 gold, 20 silver, and 13 bronze), finishing sixth in the overall medal standings. Eight of these medals were awarded to the team in athletics and canoeing, six in cycling, and four each in equestrian and judo. Seven German athletes won more than a single Olympic medal in London. In team sports, the men's field hockey team managed to defend its Olympic title from Beijing, winning the gold medal against the Netherlands. For the first time since 1932, Germany did not win an Olympic medal in swimming, except for the open water marathon.

Among the nation's medalists were equestrian rider Michael Jung, who led his eventing team to win its first Olympic gold medal in London, and track cyclist Kristina Vogel, who claimed the title in the women's team sprint, along with Miriam Welte. Discus thrower and pre-Olympic favorite Robert Harting celebrated his gold medal victory by ripping off his shirt and then running a hurdle lap. Meanwhile, gymnast Marcel Nguyen won two silver medals in the men's all-around and men's parallel bars exercises. Table tennis player Dimitrij Ovtcharov led his team to win a bronze medal in the men's event. Other notable accomplishments included two gold medals won by rowers in men's eight and quadruple sculls, and three gold medals in sprint canoeing.

== Medalists ==
Medal	Name	Sport	Event	Date
Gold	Sandra Auffarth; Michael Jung; Ingrid Klimke; Dirk Schrade; Peter Thomsen	Equestrian	Team eventing	31 July
Gold	Michael Jung	Equestrian	Individual eventing	31 July
Gold	Filip Adamski; Andreas Kuffner; Eric Johannesen; Maximilian Reinelt; Richard Schmidt; Lukas Müller; Florian Mennigen; Kristof Wilke; Martin Sauer	Rowing	Men's eight	1 August
Gold	Kristina Vogel; Miriam Welte	Cycling	Women's team sprint	2 August
Gold	Karl Schulze; Philipp Wende; Lauritz Schoof; Tim Grohmann	Rowing	Men's quadruple sculls	3 August
Gold	Robert Harting	Athletics	Men's discus throw	7 August
Gold	Sebastian Brendel	Canoeing	Men's C-1 1000 m	8 August
Gold	Peter Kretschmer; Kurt Kuschela	Canoeing	Men's C-2 1000 m	9 August
Gold	Franziska Weber; Tina Dietze	Canoeing	Women's K-2 500 m	9 August
Gold	Julius Brink; Jonas Reckermann	Beach volleyball	Men's tournament	9 August
Gold	Germany men's national field hockey team: Oskar Deecke; Florian Fuchs; Moritz Fürste; Martin Häner; Tobias Hauke; Oliver Korn; Maximilian Müller; Jan-Philipp Rabente; Thilo Stralkowski; Max Weinhold; Benjamin Weß; Timo Weß; Christopher Wesley; Matthias Witthaus; Christopher Zeller; Philipp Zeller	Field hockey	Men's tournament	11 August
Silver	Britta Heidemann	Fencing	Women's épée	30 July
Silver	Sideris Tasiadis	Canoe slalom	Men's slalom C-1	31 July
Silver	Ole Bischof	Judo	Men's 81 kg	31 July
Silver	Annekatrin Thiele; Carina Bär; Julia Richter; Britta Oppelt	Rowing	Women's quadruple sculls	1 August
Silver	Judith Arndt	Cycling	Women's road time trial	1 August
Silver	Tony Martin	Cycling	Men's road time trial	1 August
Silver	Kerstin Thiele	Judo	Women's 70 kg	1 August
Silver	Marcel Nguyen	Gymnastics	Men's artistic individual all-around	1 August
Silver	David Storl	Athletics	Men's shot put	3 August
Silver	Lilli Schwarzkopf	Athletics	Heptathlon	4 August
Silver	Marcel Nguyen	Gymnastics	Men's parallel bars	7 August
Silver	Fabian Hambüchen	Gymnastics	Men's horizontal bar	7 August
Silver	Helen Langehanenberg; Dorothee Schneider; Kristina Sprehe	Equestrian	Team dressage	7 August
Silver	Maximilian Levy	Cycling	Men's keirin	7 August
Silver	Carolin Leonhardt; Franziska Weber; Katrin Wagner-Augustin; Tina Dietze	Canoeing	Women's K-4 500 m	8 August
Silver	Christina Obergföll	Athletics	Women's javelin throw	9 August
Silver	Thomas Lurz	Swimming	Men's 10 km open water	10 August
Silver	Björn Otto	Athletics	Pole vault	10 August
Silver	Sabine Spitz	Cycling	Women's cross-country	11 August
Silver	Betty Heidler	Athletics	Women's hammer throw	10 August
Bronze	Sandra Auffarth	Equestrian	Individual eventing	31 July
Bronze	Hannes Aigner	Canoeing	Men's slalom K-1	1 August
Bronze	Dimitrij Ovtcharov	Table tennis	Men's singles	2 August
Bronze	Dimitri Peters	Judo	Men's 100 kg	2 August
Bronze	René Enders; Maximilian Levy; Robert Förstemann	Cycling	Men's team sprint	2 August
Bronze	Andreas Tölzer	Judo	Men's +100 kg	3 August
Bronze	Sebastian Bachmann; Peter Joppich; Benjamin Kleibrink; André Weßels	Fencing	Men's team foil	5 August
Bronze	Max Hoff	Canoeing	Men's K-1 1000 m	8 August
Bronze	Martin Hollstein; Andreas Ihle	Canoeing	Men's K-2 1000 m	8 August
Bronze	Timo Boll; Dimitrij Ovtcharov; Bastian Steger	Table tennis	Men's team	8 August
Bronze	Linda Stahl	Athletics	Women's javelin throw	9 August
Bronze	Raphael Holzdeppe	Athletics	Pole vault	10 August
Bronze	Helena Fromm	Taekwondo	Women's 67 kg	10 August

Medals by sport
Sport	1st place, gold medalist(s)	2nd place, silver medalist(s)	3rd place, bronze medalist(s)	Total
Canoeing	3	2	3	8
Equestrian	2	1	1	4
Rowing	2	1	0	3
Athletics	1	5	2	8
Cycling	1	4	1	6
Beach volleyball	1	0	0	1
Field hockey	1	0	0	1
Judo	0	2	2	4
Gymnastics	0	3	0	3
Fencing	0	1	1	2
Swimming	0	1	0	1
Table tennis	0	0	2	2
Taekwondo	0	0	1	1
Total	11	20	13	44

== Delegation ==
Deutscher Olympischer Sportbund (DOSB) selected a team of 392 athletes, 218 men and 174 women, to compete in 23 sports; it was the nation's smallest team sent to the Olympics after its reunification in 1990. Germany qualified teams only in field hockey, and men's indoor volleyball. Athletics was the largest team by sport, with a total of 77 competitors.

The German team featured twelve defending champions from Beijing, including judoka Ole Bischof, freestyle swimmer Britta Steffen, triathlete and two-time world champion Jan Frodeno, modern pentathlete Lena Schöneborn, and weightlifter Matthias Steiner. Other notable German athletes also included swimmer and world-record holder Paul Biedermann, gymnast and pre-Olympic favorite Marcel Nguyen, track cyclist and four-time World Cup champion Maximilian Levy, and open water swimmer Thomas Lurz, bronze medalist in Beijing.

Two naturalized German athletes made their sixth Olympic appearance as individuals: Mongolian-born pistol shooter Munkhbayar Dorjsuren, who won two Olympic bronze medals (including one from Beijing), and Uzbek-born gymnast Oksana Chusovitina, who won silver in the women's vault exercises. Other naturalized athletes included Kazakh-born marathon runner Irina Mikitenko, who competed at her fifth Olympics as an individual athlete, and Georgian-born trampoline gymnast Anna Dogonadze, who represented her current nation in four consecutive Olympic Games. Pistol shooter and triple Olympic gold medalist Ralf Schumann was at his seventh appearance, having participated at every Olympic Games since 1988 (his first under the former East Germany). Rifle shooters Maik Eckhardt and Sonja Pfeilschifter, on the other hand, made their fifth Olympic appearance, although the latter had participated in the Games since 1992. Equestrian eventing rider and Olympic gold medalist Peter Thomsen, at age 51, was the oldest athlete of the team, while gymnast Janine Berger was the youngest, at age 16.

Several German athletes also came from their families, who previously competed at the Summer Olympics. Ingrid Klimke, daughter of the late Reiner Klimke, and Meredith Michaels-Beerbaum, sister-in-law of four-time gold medalist Ludger Beerbaum, followed their families' role and tradition in participating at the Olympic Games and ultimately, in winning an Olympic equestrian medal. Natascha Keller, who competed at her fifth Olympics, succeeded her family's role to lead the national team in women's field hockey. Because of her sporting success and popularity, Keller became Germany's first female flag bearer at the opening ceremony since 2000, and the fourth in Olympic history.

The following is the list of number of competitors participating in the Games. Note that reserves in fencing, field hockey, football, and handball are not counted as athletes:

Sport	Men	Women	Total
Archery	1	1	2
Athletics	37	40	77
Badminton	4	2	6
Boxing	4	0	4
Canoeing	15	6	21
Cycling	13	12	25
Diving	4	4	8
Equestrian	4	9	13
Fencing	7	5	12
Field hockey	16	16	32
Gymnastics	6	13	19
Judo	6	5	11
Modern pentathlon	2	2	4
Rowing	28	20	48
Sailing	8	4	12
Shooting	9	8	17
Swimming	19	11	30
Table tennis	3	3	6
Taekwondo	0	2	2
Tennis	3	5	8
Triathlon	3	3	6
Volleyball	16	4	20
Weightlifting	3	2	5
Wrestling	3	1	4
Total	218	174	392

== Archery ==
Germany had qualified the following archers.

Athlete	Event	Ranking round		Round of 64	Round of 32	Round of 16	Quarterfinals	Semifinals	Final / BM	
Athlete	Event	Score	Seed	Opposition Score	Opposition Score	Opposition Score	Opposition Score	Opposition Score	Opposition Score	Rank
Camilo Mayr	Men's individual	653	52	Xing Y (CHN) (13); L 0–6	did not advance					
Elena Richter	Women's individual	642	30	Jager (DEN) (35); W 6–5	Tan Y-t (TPE) (3); L 2–6	did not advance				

== Athletics ==
German athletes have so far achieved qualifying standards and DLV standards in the following athletics events (up to a maximum of 3 athletes in each event at the 'A' Standard, and 1 at the 'B' Standard):

Key

- Note–Ranks given for track events are within the athlete's heat only
- Q = Qualified for the next round
- q = Qualified for the next round as a fastest loser or, in field events, by position without achieving the qualifying target
- NR = National record
- N/A = Round not applicable for the event
- Bye = Athlete not required to compete in round

Men
Track & road events

Athlete	Event	Heat		Semifinal		Final	
Athlete	Event	Result	Rank	Result	Rank	Result	Rank
Erik Balnuweit	110 m hurdles	13:77	6	Did not advance			
Matthias Bühler	110 m hurdles	13:68	6	Did not advance			
Arne Gabius	5000 m	13:28.01	7	—N/a		Did not advance	
André Höhne	20 km walk	—N/a				1:22:02	21
André Höhne	50 km walk	—N/a				3:44:26	11
Alexander John	110 m hurdles	13:67	6	Did not advance			
Christopher Linke	50 km walk	—N/a				3:49:19	24
Sören Ludolph	800 m	1:48.57	7	Did not advance			
Silvio Schirrmeister	400 m hurdles	50.21	4	Did not advance			
Carsten Schlangen	1500 m	3:41.51	6 Q	3:38.23	11	did not advance	
Steffen Uliczka	3000 m steeplechase	8:41.08	13	—N/a		Did not advance	
Lucas Jakubczyk; Martin Keller; Alexander Kosenkow; Julian Reus; Tobias Unger	4 × 100 m relay	38.37	7	—N/a		Did not advance	
Kamghe Gaba; Eric Krüger; Jonas Plass; Thomas Schneider	4 × 400 m relay	3:03.50	6	—N/a		Did not advance	

Field events

Athlete	Event	Qualification		Final	
Athlete	Event	Distance	Position	Distance	Position
Ralf Bartels	Shot put	20.00	16	Did not advance	
Sebastian Bayer	Long jump	7.92	12 q	8.10	5
Alyn Camara	Long jump	7.72	22	Did not advance	
Matthias de Zordo	Javelin throw	NM	—	Did not advance	
Tino Häber	Javelin throw	80.39	12 q	81.21	8
Robert Harting	Discus throw	66.22	2 Q	68.27	1st place, gold medalist(s)
Raphael Holzdeppe	Pole vault	5.65	1 q	5.91	3rd place, bronze medalist(s)
Malte Mohr	Pole vault	5.50	9 q	5.50	9
Markus Münch	Discus throw	59.95	30	Did not advance	
Björn Otto	Pole vault	5.50	9 q	5.91	2nd place, silver medalist(s)
Christian Reif	Long jump	7.92	13	Did not advance	
David Storl	Shot put	21.15	2 Q	21.86	2nd place, silver medalist(s)
Martin Wierig	Discus throw	64.13	8 q	65.85	6

Combined events – Decathlon

Athlete	Event	100 m	LJ	SP	HJ	400 m	110H	DT	PV	JT	1500 m	Final	Rank
Pascal Behrenbruch	Result	11.06	7.15 =SB	15.67	1.96	50.04	14.33	44.71	4.70	64.80	4:37.46	8126	10
Pascal Behrenbruch	Points	847	850	831	767	813	932	761	819	810	696	8126	10
Rico Freimuth	Result	10.65	7.21 SB	14.87	1.90	48.06	13.89	49.11 PB	4.90 PB	57.37	4:37.62	8320	6
Rico Freimuth	Points	940	864	782	714	906	989	852	880	698	695	8320	6
Jan-Felix Knobel	Result	11.42	7.05	15.29	1.90	49.87	15.03	46.10	4.40	DNS	—	DNF	
Jan-Felix Knobel	Points	769	826	808	714	821	846	790	731	0	—	DNF	

Women
Track & road events

Athlete	Event	Heat		Quarterfinal		Semifinal		Final	
Athlete	Event	Result	Rank	Result	Rank	Result	Rank	Result	Rank
Susanne Hahn	Marathon	—N/a						2:30:22	32
Corinna Harrer	1500 m	4:07.83	10 q	—N/a		4:05.70	7	Did not advance	
Sabine Krantz	20 km walk	—N/a						DNF	
Gesa Felicitas Krause	3000 m steeplechase	9:24.91	1 Q	—N/a				9:23.52	8
Irina Mikitenko	Marathon	—N/a						2:26:44	14
Sabrina Mockenhaupt	10000 m	—N/a						31:50.35	17
Antje Möldner-Schmidt	3000 m steeplechase	9:26.57	4 Q	—N/a				9:21.78	7
Carolin Nytra	100 m hurdles	13.30	3 Q	—N/a		13.31	7	Did not advance	
Tatjana Pinto	100 m	Bye		11.39	4	Did not advance			
Cindy Roleder	100 m hurdles	13.06	4 q	—N/a		13.02	7	Did not advance	
Verena Sailer	100 m	Bye		11.12	3 Q	11.25	6	Did not advance	
Melanie Seeger	20 km walk	—N/a						1:30:44	19
Anne Cibis; Leena Günther; Yasmin Kwadwo; Tatjana Pinto; Verena Sailer; Marion Wagner	4 × 100 m relay	42.69	3 Q	—N/a				42.67	5
Esther Cremer; Maral Feizbakhsh; Christiane Klopsch; Fabienne Kohlmann; Janin Lindenberg	4 × 400 m relay	3:31.06	8	—N/a				Did not advance	

Field events

Athlete	Event	Qualification		Final	
Athlete	Event	Distance	Position	Distance	Position
Ariane Friedrich	High jump	1.93 SB	14	Did not advance	
Betty Heidler	Hammer throw	74.44	3 Q	77.13	2nd place, silver medalist(s)
Kathrin Klaas	Hammer throw	74.14	5 Q	76.05 PB	5
Nadine Kleinert	Shot put	18.36	13	Did not advance	
Sosthene Moguenara	Long jump	6.23	21	Did not advance	
Katharina Molitor	Javelin throw	62.05	9 Q	62.89	6
Nadine Müller	Discus throw	65.89	2 Q	65.94	4
Anna Rüh	Discus throw	62.98	9 q	61.36	9
Julia Fischer	Discus throw	60.23	20	Did not advance	
Christina Obergföll	Javelin throw	66.14	2 Q	65.16	2nd place, silver medalist(s)
Lisa Ryzih	Pole vault	4.55	4 q	4.45	=6
Christina Schwanitz	Shot put	18.62	9 q	18.47	10
Silke Spiegelburg	Pole vault	4.55	6 q	4.65	4
Linda Stahl	Javelin throw	64.78 SB	4 Q	64.91 SB	3rd place, bronze medalist(s)
Martina Strutz	Pole vault	4.55	7 q	4.55	5
Josephine Terlecki	Shot put	17.78	19	Did not advance	

Combined events – Heptathlon

Athlete	Event	100H	HJ	SP	200 m	LJ	JT	800 m	Final	Rank
Julia Mächtig	Result	14.54	1.68	14.99	25.38	4.06	44.40	2:20.34	5338	31
Julia Mächtig	Points	903	830	860	852	322	752	819	5338	31
Jennifer Oeser	Result	13.42 SB	1.80	14.16 SB	24.39 SB	6.07	46.61	DNF	5455	30
Jennifer Oeser	Points	1062	978	805	944	871	795	0	5455	30
Lilli Schwarzkopf	Result	13.26 PB	1.83 PB	14.77 SB	24.77 SB	6.30 SB	51.73	2:10.50 SB	6649 PB	2nd place, silver medalist(s)
Lilli Schwarzkopf	Points	1086	1016	845	908	943	894	957	6649 PB	2nd place, silver medalist(s)

== Badminton ==
Athlete	Event	Group Stage				Elimination	Quarterfinal	Semifinal	Final / BM	
Athlete	Event	Opposition Score	Opposition Score	Opposition Score	Rank	Opposition Score	Opposition Score	Opposition Score	Opposition Score	Rank
Marc Zwiebler	Men's singles	Rasheed (MDV); W 21–9, 21–6	Zavadsky (UKR); W 17–21, 21–10, 21–16	—N/a	1 Q	Chen (CHN); L 21–19, 12–21, 9–21	Did not advance			
Ingo Kindervater; Johannes Schöttler	Men's doubles	Cai Y / Fu Hf (CHN); L 20–22, 16–21	Fang C-m / Lee S-m (TPE); L 15–21, 16–21	Smith / Warfe (AUS); W 21–13, 21–14	3	—N/a	Did not advance			
Juliane Schenk	Women's singles	Griga (UKR); W 21–12, 21–14	Gavnholt (CZE); W 21–18, 21–14	—N/a	1 Q	Intanon (THA); L 16–21, 15–21	Did not advance			
Michael Fuchs; Birgit Michels	Mixed doubles	Zhang N / Zhao Yl (CHN); L 6–21, 7–21	Nikolaenko / Sorokina (RUS); W 21–18, 12–21, 21–19	Adcock / Bankier (GBR); W 11–21, 21–17, 21–14	2 Q	—N/a	Ahmad / Natsir (INA); L 15–21, 9–21	Did not advance		

== Boxing ==
Germany has so far qualified boxers for the following events.

Men

Athlete	Event	Round of 32	Round of 16	Quarterfinals	Semifinals	Final	
Athlete	Event	Opposition Result	Opposition Result	Opposition Result	Opposition Result	Opposition Result	Rank
Patrick Wojcicki	Welterweight	Vastine (FRA); L 12–16	Did not advance				
Stefan Härtel	Middleweight	Collazo (PUR); W 18–10	O'Neill (IRL); W 19–12	Ogogo (GBR); L 10–15	Did not advance		
Enrico Kölling	Light heavyweight	Donfack (CMR); W 15–6	Benchabla (ALG); L 9–12	Did not advance			
Erik Pfeifer	Super heavyweight	—N/a	Dychko (KAZ); L 4–14	Did not advance			

== Canoeing ==
=== Slalom ===
Athlete	Event	Preliminary						Semifinal		Final	
Athlete	Event	Run 1	Rank	Run 2	Rank	Best	Rank	Time	Rank	Time	Rank
Hannes Aigner	Men's K-1	92.56	11	83.49	1	83.49	1 Q	97.60	5 Q	94.92	3rd place, bronze medalist(s)
Sideris Tasiadis	Men's C-1	96.12	7	92.83	3	92.83	4 Q	98.94	1 Q	98.09	2nd place, silver medalist(s)
Frank Henze; David Schröder	Men's C-2	107.50	9	107.79	8	107.50	11	Did not advance			
Jasmin Schornberg	Women's K-1	106.27	6	102.14	6	102.14	8 Q	112.25	7 Q	110.97	5

=== Sprint ===
Men

Athlete	Event	Heats		Semifinals		Final	
Athlete	Event	Time	Rank	Time	Rank	Time	Rank
Sebastian Brendel	C-1 200 m	41.511	2 Q	42.161	4 FB	45.852	15
Sebastian Brendel	C-1 1000 m	3:56.469	3 Q	3:52.122	1 FA	3:47.176	1st place, gold medalist(s)
Max Hoff	K-1 1000 m	3:30.709	2 Q	3:29.294	1 FA	3:27.759	3rd place, bronze medalist(s)
Ronald Rauhe	K-1 200 m	36.817	4 Q	36.183	4 FA	37.553	8
Jonas Ems; Ronald Rauhe	K-2 200 m	32.905	2 Q	32.662	2 FA	35.405	8
Martin Hollstein; Andreas Ihle	K-2 1000 m	3:15.263	1 FA	Bye		3:10.117	3rd place, bronze medalist(s)
Peter Kretschmer; Kurt Kuschela	C-2 1000 m	3:34.435	1 FA	Bye		3:33.804	1st place, gold medalist(s)
Norman Bröckl; Marcus Groß; Max Hoff; Tim Wieskötter	K-4 1000 m	2:56.987	2 Q	2:53.575	2 FA	2:56.172	4

Women

Athlete	Event	Heats		Semifinals		Final	
Athlete	Event	Time	Rank	Time	Rank	Time	Rank
Silke Hörmann	K-1 200 m	42.697	4 Q	42.005	6 FB	45.686	15
Katrin Wagner-Augustin	K-1 500 m	1:53.438	3 Q	1:53.241	4 FB	1:52.402	9
Tina Dietze; Franziska Weber	K-2 500 m	1:44.195	2 Q	1:41.543	1 FA	1:42.213	1st place, gold medalist(s)
Tina Dietze; Carolin Leonhardt; Katrin Wagner-Augustin; Franziska Weber	K-4 500 m	1:31.633	1 FA	Bye		1:31.298	2nd place, silver medalist(s)

Qualification Legend: FA = Qualify to final (medal); FB = Qualify to final B (non-medal)

== Cycling ==
=== Road ===
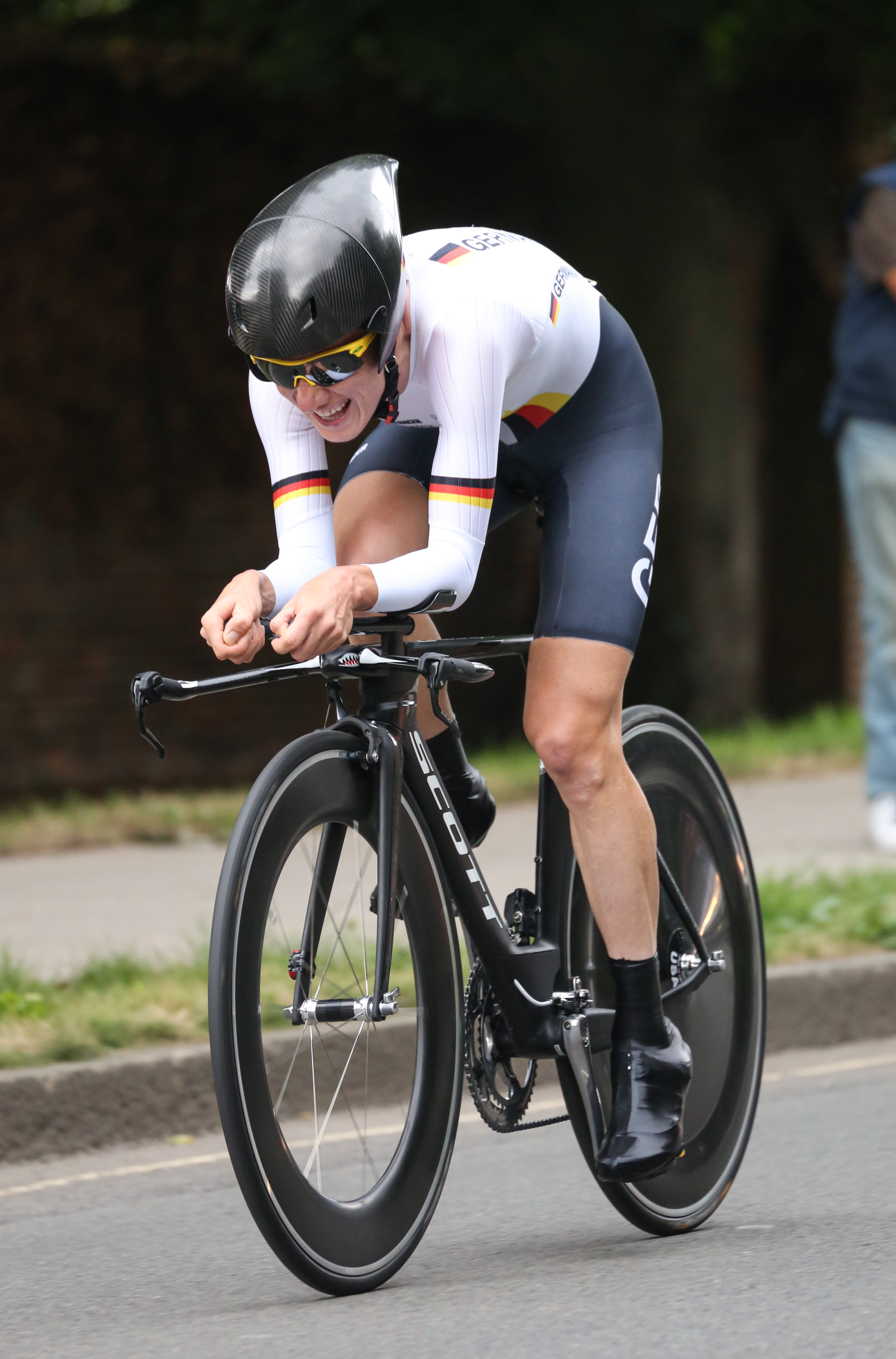
Judith Arndt won the silver medal in women's road time trial.

Men

Athlete	Event	Time	Rank
John Degenkolb	Road race	5:48:49	104
Bert Grabsch	Road race	5:46:47	94
Bert Grabsch	Time trial	53:18.04	8
André Greipel	Road race	5:46:37	26
Tony Martin	Road race	Did not finish	
Tony Martin	Time trial	51:21.54	2nd place, silver medalist(s)
Marcel Sieberg	Road race	5:47:08	101

Women

Athlete	Event	Time	Rank
Judith Arndt	Road race	3:36:28	37
Judith Arndt	Time trial	37:50.29	2nd place, silver medalist(s)
Charlotte Becker	Road race	OTL	
Ina-Yoko Teutenberg	Road race	3:35:56	4
Trixi Worrack	Road race	3:36:04	33
Trixi Worrack	Time trial	39:30.73	9

=== Track ===
Sprint

Athlete	Event	Qualification		Round 1	Repechage 1	Round 2	Repechage 2	Quarterfinals	Semifinals	Final	
Athlete	Event	Time Speed (km/h)	Rank	Opposition Time Speed (km/h)	Opposition Time Speed (km/h)	Opposition Time Speed (km/h)	Opposition Time Speed (km/h)	Opposition Time Speed (km/h)	Opposition Time Speed (km/h)	Opposition Time Speed (km/h)	Rank
Robert Förstemann	Men's sprint	10.072; 71.485	4	Esterhuizen (RSA); W 11.100; 64.864	Bye	Phillip (TRI); L	Kelemen (CZE); Esterhuizen (RSA); W 10.881; 66.170	Baugé (FRA); L	Did not advance	5th place final Dmitriev (RUS); Watkins (USA); Awang (MAS); L	7
Kristina Vogel	Women's sprint	11.027; 65.294	4	Cueff (FRA); W 11.605; 62.042	Bye	Shulika (UKR); W 11.547; 62.353	Bye	Krupeckaitė (LTU); W 11.541, W 11.568	Pendleton (GBR); L, L	Guo (CHN); L, L	4

Team sprint

Athlete	Event	Qualification		Semifinals		Final	
Athlete	Event	Time Speed (km/h)	Rank	Opposition Time Speed (km/h)	Rank	Opposition Time Speed (km/h)	Rank
René Enders; Maximilian Levy; Robert Förstemann	Men's team sprint	43.710; 61.770	5 Q	Russia; W 43.178; 62.531	3 Q	Australia; W 43.209; 62.486	3rd place, bronze medalist(s)
Kristina Vogel; Miriam Welte	Women's team sprint	32.630; 55.163	3 Q	France; W 32.701; 55.044	2 Q	China; W 32.798; 54.881	1st place, gold medalist(s)

Pursuit

Athlete	Event	Qualification		Semifinals		Final	
Athlete	Event	Time	Rank	Opponent Results	Rank	Opponent Results	Rank
Judith Arndt; Charlotte Becker; Lisa Brennauer; Madeleine Sandig	Women's team pursuit	3:22.058	7 Q	Netherlands; 3:21.086	7	Belarus; 3:20.824	8

Keirin

Athlete	Event	1st Round	Repechage	2nd Round	Final
Athlete	Event	Rank	Rank	Rank	Rank
Maximilian Levy	Men's keirin	1 Q	Bye	1 Q	2nd place, silver medalist(s)
Kristina Vogel	Women's keirin	1 Q	Bye	6 Q	10

Omnium

Athlete	Event	Flying lap		Points race		Elimination race	Individual pursuit		Scratch race	Time trial		Total points	Rank
Athlete	Event	Time	Rank	Points	Rank	Rank	Time	Rank	Rank	Time	Rank	Total points	Rank
Roger Kluge	Men's omnium	13.571	11	79	1	7	4:25.554	5	4	1:03.144	5	33	4

=== Mountain biking ===
Athlete	Event	Time	Rank
Manuel Fumic	Men's cross-country	1:30:31	7
Robert Förstemann*	Men's cross-country	DNS	
Moritz Milatz	Men's cross-country	1:38:59	34
Adelheid Morath	Women's cross-country	1:37:17	16
Sabine Spitz	Women's cross-country	1:31:54	2nd place, silver medalist(s)

Förstemann was nominated in Mountain biking, but participated as track biker.

=== BMX ===
Athlete	Event	Seeding		Quarterfinal		Semifinal		Final	
Athlete	Event	Result	Rank	Points	Rank	Points	Rank	Result	Rank
Maik Baier	Men's BMX	40.231	29	31	8	Did not advance			
Luis Brethauer	Men's BMX	39.431	19	22	5	Did not advance			

== Diving ==
Germany has qualified 8 athletes, which includes two quota place in the men's 3 m springboard and two in the men's 10 m platform events;

Men

Athlete	Event	Preliminaries		Semifinals		Final	
Athlete	Event	Points	Rank	Points	Rank	Points	Rank
Stephan Feck	3 m springboard	DNF	29	Did not advance			
Patrick Hausding	3 m springboard	477.15	4 Q	485.55	6 Q	505.55	4
Sascha Klein	10 m platform	525.05	3 Q	503.75	8 Q	496.30	10
Martin Wolfram	10 m platform	496.80	4 Q	519.00	5 Q	506.65	8
Patrick Hausding; Sascha Klein	10 m synchronized platform	—N/a				446.07	7

Women

Athlete	Event	Preliminaries		Semifinals		Final	
Athlete	Event	Points	Rank	Points	Rank	Points	Rank
Katja Dieckow	3 m springboard	311.70	12 Q	312.50	16	Did not advance	
Nora Subschinski	3 m springboard	303.90	15 Q	313.20	14	Did not advance	
Maria Kurjo	10 m platform	319.65	16 Q	264.45	17	Did not advance	
Christin Steuer	10 m platform	341.75	3 Q	339.90	7 Q	351.35	7
Christin Steuer; Nora Subschinski	10 m synchronized platform	—N/a				312.78	6

== Equestrian ==
Germany has qualified a complete team in all competitions (dressage, eventing, jumping). That makes a total of twelve athletes (3 in dressage, 5 in eventing, 4 in jumping). Germany also qualified another dressage rider by rankings.

=== Dressage ===
Athlete	Horse	Event	Grand Prix		Grand Prix Special		Grand Prix Freestyle		Overall	
Athlete	Horse	Event	Score	Rank	Score	Rank	Technical	Artistic	Score	Rank
Anabel Balkenhol *	Dablino	Individual	70.973	24 Q	73.032	19	Did not advance			
Helen Langehanenberg	Damon Hill	Individual	81.140	3 Q	78.937	4 Q	81.036	87.571	84.303	4
Dorothee Schneider	Diva Royal	Individual	76.277	8 Q	77.571	6 Q	77.893	85.429	81.661	7
Kristina Sprehe	Desperados	Individual	79.119	4 Q	76.254	=7 Q	78.893	83.857	81.375	8
Helen Langehanenberg; Dorothee Schneider; Kristina Sprehe	See above	Team	78.845	2	77.587	2	—N/a		78.216	2nd place, silver medalist(s)

* Anabel Balkenhol only competed as an individual and her scores did not count towards the team event.

The team event is decided after the second round by adding up the scores of rounds 1 and 2 for all three riders of a nation. The Freestyle only counts towards the individual ranking with the best 18 riders of round 2 advancing to the final. Scores are then cleared and only the score of the final round determines the individual ranking.

=== Eventing ===
Athlete	Horse	Event	Dressage		Cross-country			Jumping						Total	
Athlete	Horse	Event	Dressage		Cross-country			Qualifier			Final			Total	
Athlete	Horse	Event	Penalties	Rank	Penalties	Total	Rank	Penalties	Total	Rank	Penalties	Total	Rank	Penalties	Rank
Sandra Auffarth	Opgun Louvo	Individual	40.00	7	4.80	44.80	8	0.00	44.80	5 Q	0.00	44.80	3	44.80	3rd place, bronze medalist(s)
Michael Jung	Sam	Individual	40.60 #	11	0.00	40.60	4	0.00	40.60	2 Q	0.00	40.60	1	40.60	1st place, gold medalist(s)
Ingrid Klimke	Butts Abraxxas	Individual	39.30	4	0.00	39.30	1	9.00	48.30	8 Q	Withdrew **			48.30	25
Dirk Schrade	King Artus	Individual	39.80	6	10.80	50.60 #	17	0.00	50.60 #	10 *	Did not advance			50.60 #	26
Peter Thomsen	Barny	Individual	58.50 #	58	5.20	63.70 #	33	8.00	71.70 #	30	Did not advance			71.10 #	31
Sandra Auffarth; Michael Jung; Ingrid Klimke; Dirk Schrade; Peter Thomsen	See above	Team	119.10	1	20.80	124.70	1	17.00	133.70	1	—N/a			133.70	1st place, gold medalist(s)

"#" indicates that the score of this rider does not count in the team competition, since only the best three results of a team are counted.

* Dirk Schrade would have advanced to the final but for the rule that only the best three individual riders of a nation are allowed to advance.

** Ingrid Klimke withdrew in a bid to allow her Teammate Dirk Schrade to advance to the final, however the rules did not allow this and neither Klimke nor Schrade participated in the final in the end.

The team event is decided after the Jumping qualifier by adding up penalties of dressage, cross country and the first round of jumping. The best 25 riders are then allowed to advance to the individual final with the individual ranking decided by all penalties collected throughout the whole competition.

=== Show jumping ===
Athlete	Horse	Event	Qualification								Final					Total	
Athlete	Horse	Event	Round 1		Round 2			Round 3			Round A		Round B			Total	
Athlete	Horse	Event	Penalties	Rank	Penalties	Total	Rank	Penalties	Total	Rank	Penalties	Rank	Penalties	Total	Rank	Penalties	Rank
Christian Ahlmann	Codex One	Individual	15	69 **	4	—N/a		Did not advance								15	69
Marcus Ehning	Plot Blue	Individual	1	=33 Q	4	5	=27 Q	0	5	=7 Q	0	=1	9	9	=12	9	=12
Janne Friederike Meyer	Lambrasco	Individual	0	=1 Q	4	4	=17 Q	17	21	=41	Did not advance					21	=41
Meredith Michaels-Beerbaum*	Bella Donna	Individual	0	=1 Q	8 #	8	=31 Q	1	9	=22 Q	8	=23	Did not advance			8	=23
Christian Ahlmann; Marcus Ehning; Janne Friederike Meyer; Meredith Michaels-Beerbaum*	See above	Team	—N/a								12	=10	Did not advance			12	=10

"#" indicates that the score of this rider does not count in the team competition, since only the best three results of a team are counted.

* Philipp Weishaupt was originally nominated to compete with his horse Monte Bellini. He had to withdraw after his horse contracted an infection a few days before the games. Meredith Michaels-Beerbaum replaced him in the individual and team event.

** Because of his low ranking in the first round, Christian Ahlmann did not advance to the individual final. He was however allowed to continue to compete in the team event (up until the team was eliminated) as the penalties of round 1 did not count towards the team ranking.

The team event is decided after the third round of the qualifier with the team score being determined by the penalties of rounds two and three. Only the best 35 riders (based on the cumulative scores of rounds 1 to 3) advance to the individual final. Before the final every rider's score is cleared with the individual ranking being determined by adding up the penalties of rounds A and B. If there is a tie, a jump-off takes place.

== Fencing ==
Germany has qualified 12 fencers. An additional three fencers were nominated as alternate athletes for the team competitions.

Men

Athlete	Event	Round of 64	Round of 32	Round of 16	Quarterfinal	Semifinal	Final / BM	
Athlete	Event	Opposition Score	Opposition Score	Opposition Score	Opposition Score	Opposition Score	Opposition Score	Rank
Jörg Fiedler	Individual épée	—N/a	Thompson (USA); W 15–4	Verwijlen (NED); W 15–8	Jung J-S (KOR); L 11–15	Did not advance		
Sebastian Bachmann	Individual foil	Bye	Ganeyev (RUS); W 15–9	Aspromonte (ITA); L 11–15	Did not advance			
Peter Joppich	Individual foil	Bye	Davis (GBR); W 15–10	Abouelkassem (EGY); L 10–15	Did not advance			
Benjamin Kleibrink	Individual foil	Bye	Ota (JPN); L 5–15	Did not advance				
Sebastian Bachmann; Peter Joppich; Benjamin Kleibrink; André Weßels	Team foil	—N/a			Russia; W 44–40	Japan; L 40–41	United States; W 45–27	3rd place, bronze medalist(s)
Max Hartung	Individual sabre	Bye	Tarantino (ITA); W 15–14	Gu B-G (KOR); W 15–14	Szilágyi (HUN); L 13–15	Did not advance		
Nicolas Limbach	Individual sabre	Bye	Skrodzki (POL); W 15–8	Wagner (GER); W 15–7	Kovalev (RUS); L 12–15	Did not advance		
Benedikt Wagner	Individual sabre	Bye	Agresta (BRA); W 15–6	Limbach (GER); L 7–15	Did not advance			
Max Hartung; Nicolas Limbach; Benedikt Wagner	Team sabre	—N/a			South Korea; L 38–45	Classification semi-final Belarus; W 45–40	5th place final China; W 45–30	5

Women

Athlete	Event	Round of 64	Round of 32	Round of 16	Quarterfinal	Semifinal	Final / BM	
Athlete	Event	Opposition Score	Opposition Score	Opposition Score	Opposition Score	Opposition Score	Opposition Score	Rank
Imke Duplitzer	Individual épée	Martinez (VEN); W 15–10	Sun Yj (CHN); L 10–15	Did not advance				
Britta Heidemann	Individual épée	Bye	Del Carretto (ITA); W 14–13	Li N (CHN); W 14–13	Besbes (TUN); W 15–12	Shin A-L (KOR); W 6–5	Shemyakina (UKR); L 8–9	2nd place, silver medalist(s)
Monika Sozanska	Individual épée	Bye	Kolobova (RUS); W 15–14	Shin A-L (KOR); L 9–14	Did not advance			
Imke Duplitzer; Britta Heidemann; Monika Sozanska	Team épée	—N/a			China; L 42–45	Classification semi-final Ukraine; W 45–36	5th place final Romania; W 45–36	5
Carolin Golubytskyi	Individual foil	Bye	Garcia (COL); W 14–9	Di Francisca (ITA); L 9–15	Did not advance			
Alexandra Bujdoso	Individual sabre	—N/a	Mikina (AZE); L 13–15	Did not advance				

== Field hockey ==
=== Men's tournament ===
Germany has qualified a team in the men's event. Germany is in Pool B of the men's competition.

Roster

The following is the Germany roster in the men's field hockey tournament of the 2012 Summer Olympics.

Head Coach: Markus Weise

4. Maximilian Müller (C)
6. Martin Häner
7. Oskar Deecke
8. Christopher Wesley
9. Moritz Fürste
13. Tobias Hauke
14. Jan-Philipp Rabente
15. Benjamin Weß
17. Timo Weß
18. Oliver Korn
19. Christopher Zeller
21. Max Weinhold (GK)
22. Matthias Witthaus
23. Florian Fuchs
25. Philipp Zeller
26. Thilo Stralkowski

Reserves:

- Linus Butt
- Nicolas Jacobi (GK)

Group play

Pos	Team	Pld	W	D	L	GF	GA	GD	Pts	Qualification
1	Netherlands	5	5	0	0	18	7	+11	15	Semi-finals
2	Germany	5	3	1	1	14	11	+3	10	Semi-finals
3	Belgium	5	2	1	2	8	7	+1	7	Fifth place game
4	South Korea	5	2	0	3	9	8	+1	6	Seventh place game
5	New Zealand	5	1	2	2	10	14	−4	5	Ninth place game
6	India	5	0	0	5	6	18	−12	0	Eleventh place game

Source: FIH

30 July 2012
21:15

Germany	2–1	Belgium
Fuchs 13'; Zeller 45'	Report	Dekeyser 4'

Umpires:
Colin Hutchinson (IRL)
Marcelo Servetto (ESP)

1 August 2012
21:15

South Korea	0–1	Germany
	Report	Zeller 33'

Umpires:
David Gentles (AUS)
Nathan Stagno (GIB)

3 August 2012
13:45

Germany	5–2	India
Fuchs 7', 16', 36'; Korn 24'; Wesley 34'	Report	Raghunath 13'; Khandker 62'

Umpires:
Kim Hong-lae (KOR)
Gary Simmonds (RSA)

5 August 2012
16:00

Netherlands	3–1	Germany
De Voogd 14'; De Nooijer 36'; Van der Weerden 41'	Report	Zeller 3'

Umpires:
David Gentles (AUS)
Ged Curran (GBR)

7 August 2012
21:15

Germany	5–5	New Zealand
Deecke 10'; Fuchs 27'; Stralkowski 47'; Zeller 51', 69'	Report	Wilson 4'; Petherick 6'; Jenness 21'; Child 30', 36'

Umpires:
David Gentles (AUS)
Hamish Jamson (GBR)

Semifinal

9 August 2012
15:30

Australia	2–4	Germany
Govers 22'; Turner 42'	Report	Fürste 27'; Witthaus 54'; Weß 59'; Fuchs 63'

Umpires:
Gary Simmonds (RSA)
Hamish Jamson (GBR)

Final

11 August 2012
20:00

(gold) Germany	2–1	Netherlands (silver)
Rabente 33', 66'	Report	Van der Weerden 54'

Umpires:
David Gentles (AUS)
Ged Curran (GBR)

=== Women's tournament ===
Germany has qualified a team in the women's event.

Roster

The following is the Germany roster in the women's field hockey tournament of the 2012 Summer Olympics.

Head Coach: Michael Behrmann

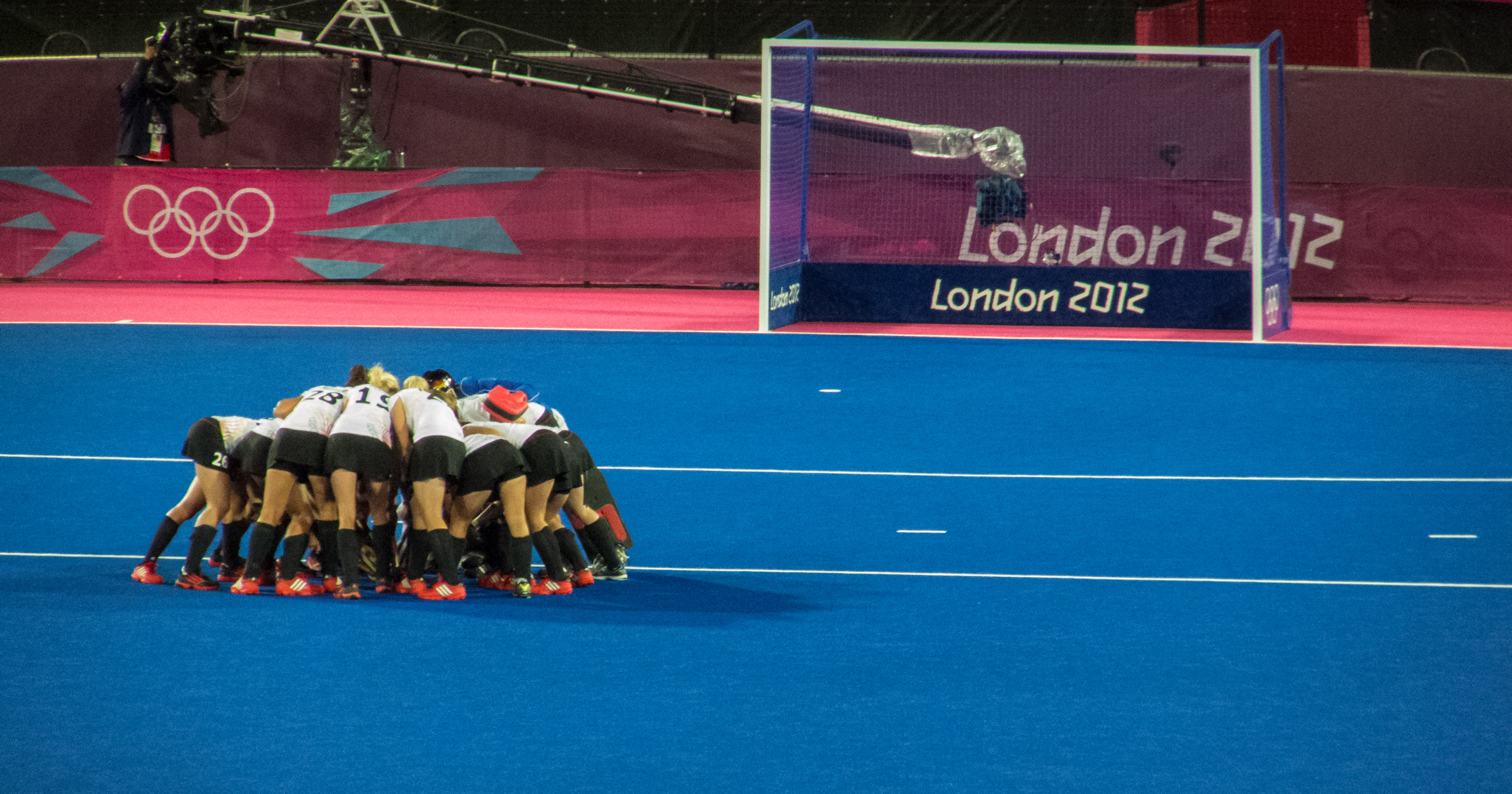
German team before the match against Argentina

1. Yvonne Frank (GK)
4. Mandy Haase
7. Natascha Keller
8. Christina Schütze
9. Kristina Hillmann
10. Nina Hasselmann
13. Katharina Otte
16. Fanny Rinne (C)
18. Lisa Hahn
19. Jennifer Plass
23. Marie Mavers
24. Maike Stöckel
25. Janne Müller-Wieland
26. Celine Wilde
27. Anke Brockmann
28. Julia Müller

Reserves:

- Kristina Reynolds (GK)
- Jana Teschke

Group play

Pos	Team	Pld	W	D	L	GF	GA	GD	Pts	Qualification
1	Argentina	5	3	1	1	12	4	+8	10	Semi-finals
2	New Zealand	5	3	1	1	9	5	+4	10	Semi-finals
3	Australia	5	3	1	1	5	2	+3	10	
4	Germany	5	2	1	2	6	7	−1	7	
5	South Africa	5	1	0	4	9	14	−5	3	
6	United States	5	1	0	4	4	13	−9	3	

Source: FIH
Rules for classification: 1) Points; 2) Matches won; 3) Goal difference; 4) Goals for; 5) Head-to-head result.

29 July 2012
21:15

Germany	2–1	United States
Rinne 8'; Hahn 21'	Report	Crandall 56'

Umpires:
Carol Metchette (IRL)
Wendy Stewart (CAN)

31 July 2012
21:15

Germany	1–3	Australia
Otte 9'	Report	Munro 20'; Flanagan 46'; Boyce 53'

Umpires:
Frances Block (GBR)
Michelle Joubert (RSA)

2 August 2012
16:00

South Africa	0–2	Germany
	Report	Mavers 25'; Rinne 44'

Umpires:
Elena Eskina (RUS)
Kang Hyun-young (KOR)

4 August 2012
21:15

Germany	1–3	Argentina
Hasselmann 67'	Report	Maccari 13'; Aymar 28'; Sánchez Moccia 67'

Umpires:
Julie Ashton-Lucy (AUS)
Chieko Soma (JPN)

6 August 2012
08:30

New Zealand	0–0	Germany
	Report

Umpires:
Soledad Iparraguirre (ARG)
Lisa Roach (AUS)

7th/8th place game

8 August 2012
11:30

South Korea	1–4	Germany
Cheon Seul-ki 8'	Report	Hahn 6', 16'; Rinne 55'; Mavers 70'

Umpires:
Carolina de la Fuente (ARG)
Claire Adenot (FRA)

== Gymnastics ==
=== Artistic ===
Men
Team

Athlete	Event	Qualification								Final							
Athlete	Event	Apparatus						Total	Rank	Apparatus						Total	Rank
Athlete	Event	F	PH	R	V	PB	HB	Total	Rank	F	PH	R	V	PB	HB	Total	Rank
Philipp Boy	Team	14.766	14.333	14.166	15.700	14.933	13.800	87.698	17 *	14.800	13.200	—N/a	15.566	—N/a	13.766	—N/a	
Fabian Hambüchen	Team	15.133	14.100	14.766	15.833	15.300	15.633 Q	90.765	3 Q	15.066	—N/a	14.858	15.633	15.400	16.166	—N/a	
Sebastian Krimmer	Team	—N/a	14.833	—N/a		14.633	14.600	—N/a		—N/a	14.733	—N/a		14.533	—N/a		
Marcel Nguyen	Team	15.433 Q	13.900	15.100	14.875	15.525 Q	15.000	89.833	7 Q	15.333	—N/a	15.133	15.833	15.500	15.133	—N/a	
Andreas Toba	Team	13.133	—N/a	14.900	15.000	—N/a				—N/a	12.533	14.833	—N/a				
Total	Team	45.332	43.266	44.766	46.533	45.758	45.233	270.888	4 Q	45.199	40.466	44.824	47.032	45.433	45.065	268.019	7

* Philipp Boy would have qualified for the individual final if not for the rule that only two participants of each nation are allowed to advance to the final (best 24 gymnasts in total).

Individual finals

Athlete	Event	Apparatus						Total	Rank
Athlete	Event	F	PH	R	V	PB	HB	Total	Rank
Fabian Hambüchen	All-around	15.200	13.266	14.800	14.766	15.400	14.333	87.765	15
Fabian Hambüchen	Horizontal bar	—N/a					16.400	16.400	2nd place, silver medalist(s)
Marcel Nguyen	All-around	15.300	13.666	15.666	15.666	15.833	15.833	91.031	2nd place, silver medalist(s)
Marcel Nguyen	Floor	14.966	—N/a					14.966	8
Marcel Nguyen	Parallel bars	—N/a				15.800	—N/a	15.800	2nd place, silver medalist(s)

Women
Team

Athlete	Event	Qualification						Final					
Athlete	Event	Apparatus				Total	Rank	Apparatus				Total	Rank
Athlete	Event	F	V	UB	BB	Total	Rank	F	V	UB	BB	Total	Rank
Janine Berger	Team	13.300	14.133 Q	12.866	—N/a			did not advance					
Kim Bùi	Team	13.600	—N/a	14.300	12.433	—N/a		did not advance					
Oksana Chusovitina	Team	—N/a	15.033 Q	—N/a	13.700	—N/a		did not advance					
Nadine Jarosch	Team	13.300	12.866	13.866	12.933	52.965	35	did not advance					
Elisabeth Seitz	Team	13.800	14.800	15.166 Q	12.700	56.466	14 Q	did not advance					
Total	Team	43.966	43.332	39.333	40.700	167.331	9	did not advance					

Individual finals

Athlete	Event	Apparatus				Total	Rank
Athlete	Event	F	V	UB	BB	Total	Rank
Janine Berger	Vault	—N/a	15.016	—N/a		15.016	4
Oksana Chusovitina	Vault	—N/a	14.783	—N/a		14.783	5
Elisabeth Seitz	All-around	13.633	14.766	15.166	13.800	57.365	10
Elisabeth Seitz	Uneven bars	—N/a		15.266	—N/a	15.266	6

=== Rhythmic ===
Athlete	Event	Qualification						Final					
Athlete	Event	Hoop	Ball	Clubs	Ribbon	Total	Rank	Hoop	Ball	Clubs	Ribbon	Total	Rank
Jana Berezko-Marggrander	Individual	26.300	26.575	27.325	24.900	105.100	17	did not advance					

Athlete	Event	Qualification				Final			
Athlete	Event	5 balls	3 ribbons 2 hoops	Total	Rank	5 balls	3 ribbons 2 hoops	Total	Rank
Mira Bimperling; Nicole Müller; Camilla Pfeffer; Cathrin Puhl; Sara Radman; Judith Hauser	Team	24.500	25.150	49.650	10	did not advance			

=== Trampoline ===
Athlete	Event	Qualification		Final	
Athlete	Event	Score	Rank	Score	Rank
Henrik Stehlik	Men's	106.065	9	did not advance	
Anna Dogonadze	Women's	100.370	10	did not advance	

== Judo ==
Men

Athlete	Event	Round of 64	Round of 32	Round of 16	Quarterfinals	Semifinals	Repechage	Final / BM	
Athlete	Event	Opposition Result	Opposition Result	Opposition Result	Opposition Result	Opposition Result	Opposition Result	Opposition Result	Rank
Tobias Englmaier	−60 kg	Davtyan (ARM); L 0002–1011	did not advance						
Christopher Völk	−73 kg	Bye	Sainjargal (MGL); L 0001–1001	did not advance					
Ole Bischof	−81 kg	Bye	Ciano (ITA); W 0101–0001	Bozbayev (KAZ); W 1011–0012	Nakai (JPN); W 1010–0000	Stevens (USA); W 0000–0000 YUS	Bye	Kim J-B (KOR); L 0000–0200	2nd place, silver medalist(s)
Christophe Lambert	−90 kg	—N/a	Mammadov (AZE); L 0001–0111	did not advance					
Dimitri Peters	−100 kg	—N/a	Ze'evi (ISR); W 1000–0000	Borodavko (LAT); W 0011–0000	Grol (NED); W 0100–0000	Khaibulaev (RUS); L 0001–0000 YUS	Bye	Sayidov (UZB); W 0210–0001	3rd place, bronze medalist(s)
Andreas Tölzer	+100 kg	—N/a	Okruashvili (GEO); W 0201–0003	Simionescu (ROU); W 1001–0004	Bor (HUN); W 0011–0002	Mikhailine (RUS); L 0002–0011	Bye	Makarau (BLR); W 1000–0001	3rd place, bronze medalist(s)

Women

Athlete	Event	Round of 32	Round of 16	Quarterfinals	Semifinals	Repechage	Final / BM	
Athlete	Event	Opposition Result	Opposition Result	Opposition Result	Opposition Result	Opposition Result	Opposition Result	Rank
Romy Tarangul	−52 kg	Kuziutina (RUS); W 0001–0000	Forciniti (ITA); L 0002–0010	did not advance				
Miryam Roper	−57 kg	Bye	Silva (BRA); L 0002–0021	did not advance				
Claudia Malzahn	−63 kg	Bye	Žolnir (SLO); L 0000–1100	did not advance				
Kerstin Thiele	−70 kg	de Villiers (NZL); W 0010–0002	Mészáros (HUN); W 0001–0001 YUS	Bosch (NED); W 0101–0000	Chen F (CHN); W 0000–0001 YUS	Bye	Décosse (FRA); L 0000–0120	2nd place, silver medalist(s)
Heide Wollert	−78 kg	Bye	Pogorzelec (POL); L 0000–0200	did not advance				

== Modern pentathlon ==
Athlete	Event	Fencing (épée one touch)			Swimming (200 m freestyle)			Riding (show jumping)			Combined: shooting/running (10 m air pistol)/(3000 m)			Total points	Final rank
Athlete	Event	Results	Rank	MP points	Time	Rank	MP points	Penalties	Rank	MP points	Time	Rank	MP Points	Total points	Final rank
Steffen Gebhardt	Men's	20–15	=6	880	2:07.08	22	1276	40	8	1160	10:37.16	8	2440	5756	5
Stefan Köllner	Men's	16–19	=20	784	2:11.71	31	1220	80	18	1120	10:59.16	21	2364	5488	26
Annika Schleu	Women's	12–23	31	688	2:20.01	23	1120	60	11	1140	12:46.04	27	1936	4884	26
Lena Schöneborn	Women's	19–16	=11	856	2:19.76	22	1124	148	29	1052	11:58.18	7	2128	5160	15

== Rowing ==
Men

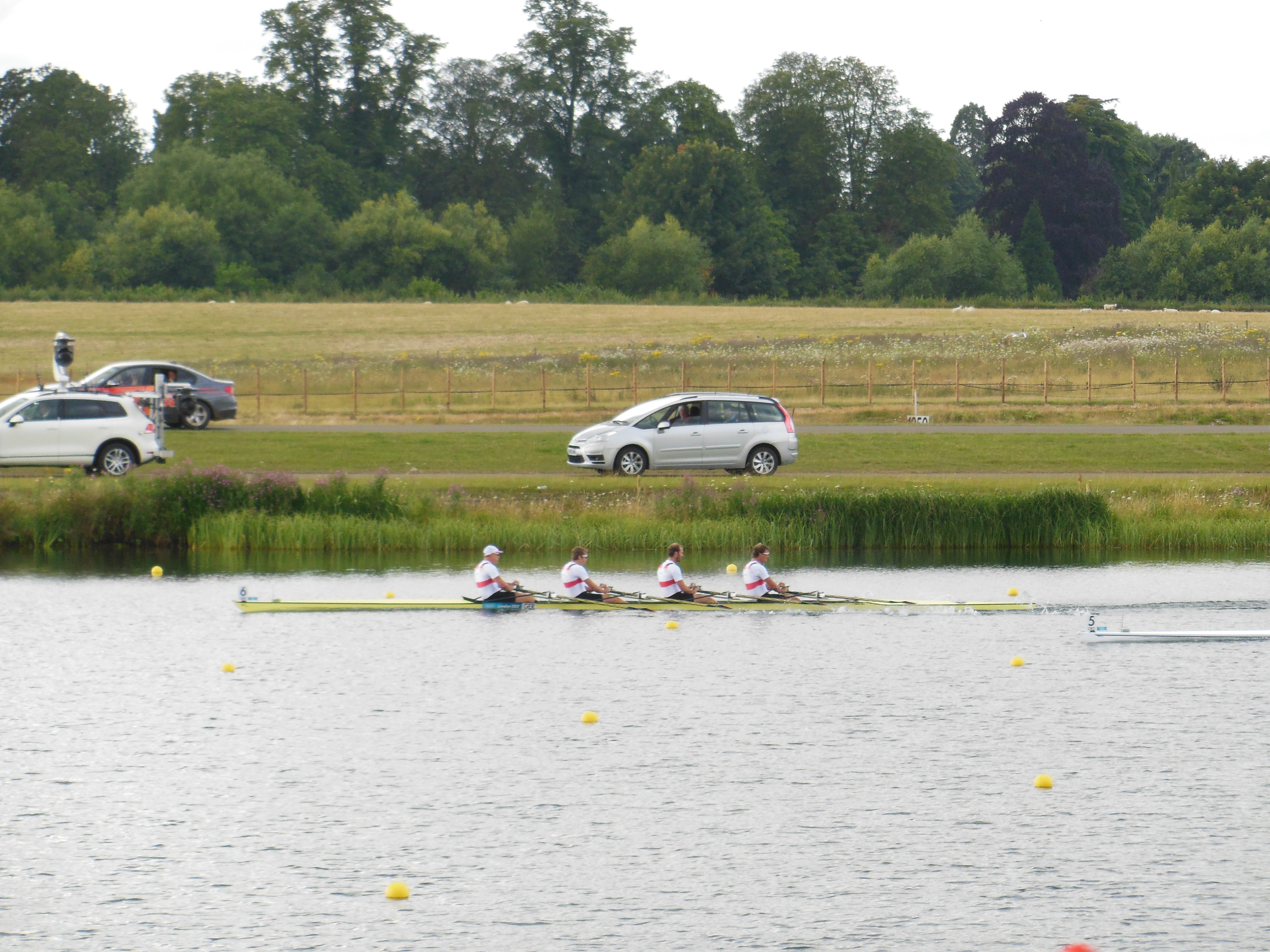
Men's team rowing to gold in the quadruple sculls final.

Athlete	Event	Heats		Repechage		Quarterfinals		Semifinals		Final	
Athlete	Event	Time	Rank	Time	Rank	Time	Rank	Time	Rank	Time	Rank
Marcel Hacker	Single sculls	6:43.80	1 Q	Bye		6:54.18	2 SA/B	7:22.07	3 FA	7:10.21	6
Anton Braun; Felix Drahotta	Pair	6:30.42	4 R	6:22.76	1 SA/B	—N/a		7:02.16	5 FB	6:49.93	7
Eric Knittel; Stephan Krüger	Double sculls	6:17.74	1 SA/B	Bye		—N/a		6:22.54	4 FB	6:23.36	9
Lars Hartig; Linus Lichtschlag	Lightweight double sculls	6:49.44	2 SA/B	Bye		—N/a		6:37.44	3 FA	6:49.07	6
Gregor Hauffe; Urs Käufer; Sebastian Schmidt; Toni Seifert	Four	5:49.84	2 SA/B	Bye		—N/a		6:04.61	3 FA	6:16.37	6
Tim Grohmann; Lauritz Schoof; Karl Schulze; Philipp Wende	Quadruple sculls	5:39.69	1 SA/B	Bye		—N/a		6:05.85	1 FA	5:42.48	1st place, gold medalist(s)
Jochen Kühner; Martin Kühner; Bastian Seibt; Lars Wichert	Lightweight four	5:52.05	3 SA/B	Bye		—N/a		6:02.10	4 FB	6:10.07	9
Filip Adamski; Eric Johannesen; Andreas Kuffner; Florian Mennigen; Lukas Müller; Maximilian Reinelt; Martin Sauer; Richard Schmidt; Kristof Wilke	Eight	5:25:52	1 FA	Bye		—N/a				5:48.75	1st place, gold medalist(s)

Women

Athlete	Event	Heats		Repechage		Quarterfinals		Semifinals		Final	
Athlete	Event	Time	Rank	Time	Rank	Time	Rank	Time	Rank	Time	Rank
Marie-Louise Dräger	Single sculls	7:44.23	3 Q	Bye		7:52.17	3 SA/B	8:01.05	6 FB	8:11.71	11
Kerstin Hartmann; Marlene Sinnig	Pair	7:10.28	4 R	7:10.28	2 FA	—N/a				7:42.06	6
Tina Manker; Stephanie Schiller	Double sculls	7:08.36	4 R	7:18.37	4 FB	—N/a				7:33.32	9
Lena Müller; Anja Noske	Lightweight double sculls	7:19.24	2 SA/B	Bye		—N/a		7:10.16	3 FA	7:22.18	6
Carina Bär; Britta Oppelt; Julia Richter; Annekatrin Thiele	Quadruple sculls	6:13.62	1 FA	Bye		—N/a				6:38.09	2nd place, silver medalist(s)
Nadja Drygalla; Julia Lepke; Kathrin Marchand; Daniela Schultze; Ronja Schütte; Laura Schwensen; Ulrike Sennewald; Constanze Siering; Katrin Thiem	Eight	6:34.32	4 R	6:27.69	5	—N/a				did not advance	7

Qualification Legend: FA=Final A (medal); FB=Final B (non-medal); FC=Final C (non-medal); FD=Final D (non-medal); FE=Final E (non-medal); FF=Final F (non-medal); SA/B=Semifinals A/B; SC/D=Semifinals C/D; SE/F=Semifinals E/F; Q=Quarterfinals; R=Repechage

== Sailing ==
Germany has qualified 1 boat for each of the following events

Men

Athlete	Event	Race											Net points	Final rank
Athlete	Event	1	2	3	4	5	6	7	8	9	10	M*	Net points	Final rank
Toni Wilhelm	RS:X	3	3	4	9	2	5	6	1	~~15~~	13	18	64	4
Simon Grotelüschen	Laser	14	12	19	3	7	8	~~20~~	4	13	10	2	92	6
Patrick Follmann; Ferdinand Gerz	470	13	17	13	~~16~~	9	10	11	14	9	10	EL	105	13
Frithjof Kleen; Robert Stanjek	Star	6	9	8	7	4	6	~~17~~	11	9	4	6	70	6

Women

Athlete	Event	Race											Net points	Final rank
Athlete	Event	1	2	3	4	5	6	7	8	9	10	M*	Net points	Final rank
Moana Delle	RS:X	4	5	2	5	~~9~~	5	4	9	3	2	12	51	5
Franziska Goltz	Laser Radial	26	20	26	24	18	~~42~~; ~~DNF~~	28	15	42; DSQ	21	EL	220	26
Friederike Belcher; Kathrin Kadelbach	470	~~19~~	2	7	13	15	5	6	5	14	11	6	84	8

Open

Athlete	Event	Race																Net points	Final rank
Athlete	Event	1	2	3	4	5	6	7	8	9	10	11	12	13	14	15	M*	Net points	Final rank
Hannes Baumann; Tobias Schadewaldt	49er	17	5	~~20~~	19	15	9	7	14	3	1	10	9	12	13	8	EL	142	11

M = Medal race; EL = Eliminated – did not advance into the medal race;

== Shooting ==
Germany has qualified for 17 quota places in shooting events;

Men

Athlete	Event	Qualification		Final	
Athlete	Event	Points	Rank	Points	Rank
Karsten Bindrich	Trap	121	10	did not advance	
Daniel Brodmeier	50 m rifle 3 positions	1156	32	did not advance	
Daniel Brodmeier	50 m rifle prone	595	4 Q	698.2	5
Ralf Buchheim	Skeet	118	10	did not advance	
Maik Eckhardt	50 m rifle 3 positions	1163	21	did not advance	
Maik Eckhardt	50 m rifle prone	589	37	did not advance	
Julian Justus	10 m air rifle	595	12	did not advance	
Tino Mohaupt	10 m air rifle	592	25	did not advance	
Christian Reitz	25 m rapid fire pistol	583	6 Q	13	6
Christian Reitz	50 m pistol	560	6 Q	654.3	7
Florian Schmidt	50 m pistol	557	17	did not advance	
Florian Schmidt	10 m air pistol	575	25	did not advance	
Ralf Schumann	25 m rapid fire pistol	577	16	did not advance	

Women

Athlete	Event	Qualification		Final	
Athlete	Event	Points	Rank	Points	Rank
Munkhbayar Dorjsuren	25 m pistol	582	12	did not advance	
Munkhbayar Dorjsuren	10 m air pistol	378	25	did not advance	
Barbara Engleder	50 m rifle 3 positions	583	7 Q	680.8	6
Beate Gauß	10 m air rifle	392	32	did not advance	
Jessica Mager	10 m air rifle	394	20	did not advance	
Sonja Pfeilschifter	50 m rifle 3 positions	581	19	did not advance	
Sonja Scheibl	Trap	64	17	did not advance	
Claudia Verdicchio-Krause	10 m air pistol	380	20	did not advance	
Claudia Verdicchio-Krause	25 m pistol	578	26	did not advance	
Christine Wenzel	Skeet	68	5 Q	89	6

== Swimming ==
DOSB has nominated the following swimmers:

Men

Athlete	Event	Heat		Semifinal		Final	
Athlete	Event	Time	Rank	Time	Rank	Time	Rank
Paul Biedermann	200 m freestyle	1:47.27	10 Q	1:46.10	4 Q	1:45.53	5
Paul Biedermann	400 m freestyle	3:48.50	12	—N/a		did not advance	
Markus Deibler	200 m individual medley	1:58.61	7 Q	1:58.88	9 Q*	1:59.10	8
Steffen Deibler	100 m butterfly	51.92	8 Q	51.76	6 Q	51.81	=4
Marco di Carli	100 m freestyle	49.03	18	did not advance			
Hendrik Feldwehr	100 m breaststroke	1:01.00	21	did not advance			
Jan-Philip Glania	100 m backstroke	54.07	12 Q	53:90	11	did not advance	
Jan-Philip Glania	200 m backstroke	1:57.01	6 Q	1:57.43	10	did not advance	
Philip Heintz	200 m individual medley	2:01.32	27	did not advance			
Marco Koch	200 m breaststroke	2:10.61	11 Q	2:10.73	13	did not advance	
Yannick Lebherz	200 m backstroke	1:58.07	12 Q	1:58.80	15	did not advance	
Yannick Lebherz	400 m individual medley	4:15.41	11	—N/a		did not advance	
Thomas Lurz	10 km open water	—N/a				1:49:58.5	2nd place, silver medalist(s)
Helge Meeuw	100 m backstroke	53.83	7 Q	53.52	7 Q	53.48	6
Clemens Rapp	200 m freestyle	1:48.75	24	did not advance			
Benjamin Starke	100 m butterfly	52.36	=16 WSO	52.40	=12	did not advance	
Christian vom Lehn	100 m breaststroke	1:00.78	19	did not advance			
Christian vom Lehn	200 m breaststroke	2:11.66	16 Q	2:10.50	12	did not advance	
Andreas Waschburger	10 km open water	—N/a				1:50:44.4	8
Markus Deibler; Marco di Carli; Christoph Fildebrandt; Benjamin Starke	4 × 100 m freestyle relay	3:13.51	5 Q	—N/a		3:13.52	6
Paul Biedermann; Dimitri Colupaev; Clemens Rapp; Tim Wallburger	4 × 200 m freestyle relay	7:09.23	3 Q	—N/a		7:06.59	4
Steffen Deibler; Marco di Carli*; Markus Deibler; Helge Meeuw; Christian vom Lehn	4 × 100 m medley relay	3:34.28	6 Q	—N/a		3:33.06	6

* advanced to the final despite only placing ninth in the semifinal due to higher placed swimmer pulling out of the final beforehand

Women

Athlete	Event	Heat		Semifinal		Final	
Athlete	Event	Time	Rank	Time	Rank	Time	Rank
Silke Lippok	200 m freestyle	1:58.59	13 Q	1:58.24	13	did not advance	
Angela Maurer	10 km open water	—N/a				1:57:52.8	5
Jenny Mensing	100 m backstroke	1:00.72	21	did not advance			
Jenny Mensing	200 m backstroke	2:10.54	15 Q	2:10.68	15	did not advance	
Theresa Michalak	200 m individual medley	2:12.75	11 Q	2:13.24	12	did not advance	
Sarah Poewe	100 m breaststroke	1:07.12	7 Q	1:07.68	11	did not advance	
Caroline Ruhnau	100 m breaststroke	1:08.43	22	did not advance			
Daniela Schreiber	100 m freestyle	54.43	=15 Q	54.39	15	did not advance	
Britta Steffen	50 m freestyle	24.70	4 Q	24.57	4 Q	24.46	4
Britta Steffen	100 m freestyle	54.42	14 Q	54.18	12	did not advance	
Alexandra Wenk	100 m butterfly	58.85	21	did not advance			
Britta Steffen; Silke Lippok; Lisa Vitting; Daniela Schreiber	4 × 100 m freestyle relay	3:39.16	9	—N/a		did not advance	
Annika Bruhn; Silke Lippok; Theresa Michalak; Daniela Schreiber	4 × 200 m freestyle relay	7:58.93	13	—N/a		did not advance	
Jenny Mensing; Sarah Poewe; Britta Steffen; Alexandra Wenk	4 × 100 m medley relay	3:59.95	9	—N/a		did not advance	

Qualification legend = S/O Swim-off; WSO Win swim-off; LSO Lost swim-off

== Table tennis ==
Germany has qualified four athletes for singles table tennis events. Based on their world rankings as of 16 May 2011 Timo Boll and Dimitrij Ovtcharov have qualified for the men's event; Wu Jiaduo and Kristin Silbereisen have qualified for the women's.

Men

Athlete	Event	Preliminary round	Round 1	Round 2	Round 3	Round 4	Quarterfinals	Semifinals	Final / BM	
Athlete	Event	Opposition Result	Opposition Result	Opposition Result	Opposition Result	Opposition Result	Opposition Result	Opposition Result	Opposition Result	Rank
Timo Boll	Singles	Bye			Alamian (IRI); W (4–0)	Crișan (ROU); L (1–4)	did not advance			
Dimitrij Ovtcharov	Singles	Bye			Drinkhall (GBR); W (4–0)	Chen (AUT); W (4–0)	Maze (DEN); W (4–3)	Zhang J (CHN); L (1–4)	Chuang C-y (TPE); W (4–2)	3rd place, bronze medalist(s)
Timo Boll; Dimitrij Ovtcharov; Bastian Steger	Team	—N/a				Sweden; W (3–1)	Austria; W (3–0)	China; L (1–3)	Hong Kong; W (3–1)	3rd place, bronze medalist(s)

Women

Athlete	Event	Preliminary round	Round 1	Round 2	Round 3	Round 4	Quarterfinals	Semifinals	Final / BM	
Athlete	Event	Opposition Result	Opposition Result	Opposition Result	Opposition Result	Opposition Result	Opposition Result	Opposition Result	Opposition Result	Rank
Wu Jiaduo	Singles	Bye			Vacenovská (CZE); W (4–2)	Feng Tw (SIN); L (2–4)	did not advance			
Kristin Silbereisen	Singles	Bye		Parker (GBR); W (4–1)	Pavlovich (BLR); L (3–4)	did not advance				
Irene Ivancan; Wu Jiaduo; Kristin Silbereisen	Team	—N/a				Australia; W (3–0)	Japan; L (0–3)	did not advance		

== Taekwondo ==
Germany has qualified 2 athletes.

Athlete	Event	Round of 16	Quarterfinals	Semifinals	Repechage	Bronze Medal	Final	
Athlete	Event	Opposition Result	Opposition Result	Opposition Result	Opposition Result	Opposition Result	Opposition Result	Rank
Sümeyye Manz	Women's −49 kg	Yang S-C (TPE); L 3–10	did not advance					
Helena Fromm	Women's −67 kg	Chu Hoang (VIE); W 13–1	Hwang K-S (KOR); L 4–8	Did not advance	Gbagbi (CIV); W 4–3	Marton (AUS); W 8–2	Did not advance	3rd place, bronze medalist(s)

== Tennis ==
Men

Athlete	Event	Round of 64	Round of 32	Round of 16	Quarterfinals	Semifinals	Final / BM	
Athlete	Event	Opposition Score	Opposition Score	Opposition Score	Opposition Score	Opposition Score	Opposition Score	Rank
Philipp Kohlschreiber	Singles	Withdrew due to injury						
Philipp Petzschner	Singles	Lacko (SVK); W 7–6^{(7–5)}, 6–1	Tipsarević (SRB); L 6–3, 3–6, 3–6	did not advance				
Christopher Kas; Philipp Petzschner	Doubles	—N/a	Davydenko / Youzhny (RUS); L 5–7, 5–7	did not advance				

Women

Athlete	Event	Round of 64	Round of 32	Round of 16	Quarterfinals	Semifinals	Final / BM	
Athlete	Event	Opposition Score	Opposition Score	Opposition Score	Opposition Score	Opposition Score	Opposition Score	Rank
Mona Barthel	Singles	U. Radwańska (POL); L 4–6, 3–6	did not advance					
Julia Görges	Singles	A. Radwańska (POL); W 7–5, 6–7^{(5–7)}, 6–4	Lepchenko (USA); W 6–3, 7–5	Kirilenko (RUS); L 6–7^{(5–7)}, 3–6	did not advance			
Angelique Kerber	Singles	Cetkovská (CZE); W 6–1, 3–0^{r}	Babos (HUN); W 6–1, 6–1	V Williams (USA); W 7–6^{(7–5)}, 7–6^{(7–5)}	Azarenka (BLR); L 4–6, 5–7	did not advance		
Sabine Lisicki	Singles	Jabeur (TUN); W 4–6, 6–0, 7–5	Shvedova (KAZ); W 4–6, 6–3, 7–5	Sharapova (RUS); L 7–6^{(10–8)}, 4–6, 3–6	did not advance			
Julia Görges; Anna-Lena Grönefeld	Doubles	—N/a	Baltacha / Keothavong (GBR); W 6–3, 6–1	Makarova / Vesnina (RUS); L 2–6, 1–6	did not advance			
Angelique Kerber; Sabine Lisicki	Doubles	—N/a	Robson / Watson (GBR); W 1–6, 6–4, 6–3	S. Williams / V. Williams (USA); L 2–6, 5–7	did not advance			

Mixed

Athlete	Event	Round of 16	Quarterfinals	Semifinals	Final / BM	
Athlete	Event	Opposition Score	Opposition Score	Opposition Score	Opposition Score	Rank
Angelique Kerber; Philipp Petzschner	Doubles	Azarenka / Mirnyi (BLR); L 2–6, 2–6	did not advance			
Sabine Lisicki; Christopher Kas	Doubles	Huber / Bryan (USA); W 7–6 ^{(7–5)}, 6–7 ^{(5–7)}, [10–5]	Vinci / Bracciali (ITA); W 4–6, 7–6 ^{(7–2)}, [10–7]	Robson / Murray (GBR); L 1–6, 7–6 ^{(9–7)}, [7–10]	Raymond / Bryan (USA); L 3–6, 6–4, [4–10]	4

== Triathlon ==
Germany has qualified the following athletes.

Athlete	Event	Swim (1.5 km)	Trans 1	Bike (40 km)	Trans 2	Run (10 km)	Total Time	Rank
Jan Frodeno	Men's	17:20	0:46	58:46	0:28	30:06	1:47:26	6
Steffen Justus	Men's	18:07	0:42	59:36	0:31	30:16	1:49:12	16
Maik Petzold	Men's	17:23	0:42	58:47	0:31	33:00	1:50:23	31
Svenja Bazlen	Women's	19:28	0:40	1:05:29	0:33	38:01	2:04:11	32
Anja Dittmer	Women's	19:25	0:44	1:05:27	0:30	35:32	2:01:38	12
Anne Haug	Women's	19:44	0:42	1:06:59	0:28	33:42	2:01:35	11

== Volleyball ==
=== Beach ===
Athlete	Event	Preliminary round	Standing	Round of 16	Quarterfinals	Semifinals	Final / BM	
Athlete	Event	Opposition Score	Standing	Opposition Score	Opposition Score	Opposition Score	Opposition Score	Rank
Julius Brink; Jonas Reckermann	Men's	Pool C Prokopiev – Semenov (RUS); W 2 – 0 (21–19, 21–17); Wu – Xu (CHN); W 2 – 1 (13–21, 21–19, 15–8); Chevallier – Heyer (SUI); W 2 – 0 (21–14, 21–16)	1 Q	Samoilovs – Sorokins (LAT); W 2 – 0 (21–12, 21–17)	Ricardo – Cunha (BRA); W 2 – 0 (21–15, 21–19)	Nummerdor – Schuil (NED); W 2 – 0 (21–14, 21–16)	Alison – Emanuel (BRA); W 2 – 1 (23–21, 16–21, 16–14)	1st place, gold medalist(s)
Jonathan Erdmann; Kay Matysik	Men's	Pool E Pļaviņš – Šmēdiņš (LAT); L 1 – 2 (21–19, 21–23, 9–15); Nummerdor – Schuil (NED); L 0 – 2 (9–21, 16–21); Hernández – Villafañe (VEN); W 2 – 1 (20–22, 21–16, 15–11)	3 Q	Alison – Emanuel (BRA); L 0 – 2 (16–21, 14–21)	did not advance			9
Sara Goller; Laura Ludwig	Women's	Pool E Bawden – Palmer (AUS); W 2 – 1 (21–18, 19–21, 15–8); Antonelli – Antunes (BRA); L 1 – 2 (19–21, 31–29, 13–15); Meppelink – van Gestel (NED); W 2 – 0 (21–18, 21–14)	2 Q	Holtwick – Semmler (GER); W 2 – 0 (21–16, 21–15)	Juliana – Larissa (BRA); L 0 – 2 (10–21, 19–21)	did not advance		5
Katrin Holtwick; Ilka Semmler	Women's	Pool A Háječková – Klapalová (CZE); W 2 – 0 (21–16, 21–18); Juliana – Larissa (BRA); L 0 – 2 (18–21, 13–21); Rigobert – Li Yuk Lo (MRI); W 2 – 0 (21–11, 21–10)	2 Q	Goller – Ludwig (GER); L 0 – 2 (16–21, 15–21)	did not advance			9

=== Indoor ===
Germany qualified a men's team for the indoor tournament.

- Men's team event – 1 team of 12 players

==== Men's tournament ====
Team roster

The following is the German roster in the men's volleyball tournament of the 2012 Summer Olympics.

Head coach: (Belgium) Vital Heynen

№	Name	Date of birth	Height	Weight	Spike	Block	2012 club
1	Marcus Popp	23 September 1981	1.92 m (6 ft 4 in)	90 kg (200 lb)	358 cm (141 in)	338 cm (133 in)	(France) Tours VB
2	Markus Steuerwald (L)	7 March 1989	1.82 m (6 ft 0 in)	85 kg (187 lb)	340 cm (130 in)	318 cm (125 in)	(France) Paris Volley
3	Sebastian Schwarz	2 October 1985	1.97 m (6 ft 6 in)	94 kg (207 lb)	340 cm (130 in)	325 cm (128 in)	(Italy) Fidia Padova
4	Simon Tischer	24 April 1982	1.94 m (6 ft 4 in)	88 kg (194 lb)	346 cm (136 in)	328 cm (129 in)	(Poland) Jastrzębski Węgiel
5	Björn Andrae (c)	14 May 1981	2.00 m (6 ft 7 in)	92 kg (203 lb)	350 cm (140 in)	330 cm (130 in)	(Russia) VC Kuzbass Kemerovo
6	Denys Kaliberda	24 June 1990	1.93 m (6 ft 4 in)	95 kg (209 lb)	343 cm (135 in)	314 cm (124 in)	(Italy) Vibo Valentia
8	Marcus Böhme	25 August 1985	2.11 m (6 ft 11 in)	116 kg (256 lb)	360 cm (140 in)	330 cm (130 in)	(Germany) VfB Friedrichshafen
9	Georg Grozer	27 November 1984	2.00 m (6 ft 7 in)	102 kg (225 lb)	374 cm (147 in)	345 cm (136 in)	(Russia) Belogorie Belogorod
10	Jochen Schöps	8 October 1983	2.00 m (6 ft 7 in)	100 kg (220 lb)	360 cm (140 in)	335 cm (132 in)	(Poland) ASSECO Resovia Rzeszów
11	Lukas Kampa	29 November 1986	1.96 m (6 ft 5 in)	90 kg (200 lb)	335 cm (132 in)	320 cm (130 in)	(Russia) Belogorie Belogorod
13	Christian Dünnes	16 June 1984	2.07 m (6 ft 9 in)	105 kg (231 lb)	350 cm (140 in)	331 cm (130 in)	(Germany) TSV Unterhaching
15	Max Günthör	9 August 1985	2.07 m (6 ft 9 in)	93 kg (205 lb)	350 cm (140 in)	325 cm (128 in)	(Germany) TSV Unterhaching

Group play

Pos	Team	Pld	W	L	Pts	SW	SL	SR	SPW	SPL	SPR
1	United States	5	4	1	13	14	4	3.500	427	370	1.154
2	Brazil	5	4	1	11	13	5	2.600	418	379	1.103
3	Russia	5	4	1	11	12	5	2.400	408	352	1.159
4	Germany	5	2	3	5	6	11	0.545	379	388	0.977
5	Serbia	5	1	4	5	7	13	0.538	413	455	0.908
6	Tunisia	5	0	5	0	1	15	0.067	294	395	0.744

29 July 2012; 11:30	Russia	3–0	Germany	Earls Court Exhibition Centre, London; Attendance: 12,500; Referees: Simone Santi (ITA), Frans Loderus (NED)
29 July 2012; 11:30	(31–29, 25–18, 25–17); Results Statistics			Earls Court Exhibition Centre, London; Attendance: 12,500; Referees: Simone Santi (ITA), Frans Loderus (NED)

31 July 2012; 17:03	United States	3–0	Germany	Earls Court Exhibition Centre, London; Attendance: 13,000; Referees: Nasr Shaaban (EGY), Rolando Cholakian (ARG)
31 July 2012; 17:03	(25–23, 25–16, 25–20); Results Statistics			Earls Court Exhibition Centre, London; Attendance: 13,000; Referees: Nasr Shaaban (EGY), Rolando Cholakian (ARG)

2 August 2012; 09:30	Serbia	2–3	Germany	Earls Court Exhibition Centre, London; Attendance: 14,000; Referees: Bela Hobor (HUN), Rolando Cholakian (ARG)
2 August 2012; 09:30	(25–22, 29–27, 18–25, 20–25, 18–20); Results Statistics			Earls Court Exhibition Centre, London; Attendance: 14,000; Referees: Bela Hobor (HUN), Rolando Cholakian (ARG)

4 August 2012; 09:30	Germany	3–0	Tunisia	Earls Court Exhibition Centre, London; Attendance: 11,000; Referees: Brian McDougall (GBR), Denny Cespedes (DOM)
4 August 2012; 09:30	(25–15, 25–16, 25–16); Results Statistics			Earls Court Exhibition Centre, London; Attendance: 11,000; Referees: Brian McDougall (GBR), Denny Cespedes (DOM)

6 August 2012; 22:00	Brazil	3–0	Germany	Earls Court Exhibition Centre, London; Attendance: 12,000; Referees: Simone Santi (ITA), Karin Zahorcova (CZE)
6 August 2012; 22:00	(25–21, 25–22, 25–19); Results Statistics			Earls Court Exhibition Centre, London; Attendance: 12,000; Referees: Simone Santi (ITA), Karin Zahorcova (CZE)

Quarterfinal

8 August 2012; 21:30	Bulgaria	3–0	Germany	Earls Court Exhibition Centre, London; Attendance: 12,000; Referees: Bela Hobor (HUN), Denny Cespedes (DOM)
8 August 2012; 21:30	(25–20, 25–16, 25–14); Results Statistics			Earls Court Exhibition Centre, London; Attendance: 12,000; Referees: Bela Hobor (HUN), Denny Cespedes (DOM)

== Weightlifting ==
Germany has qualified 3 men and 2 women.

Athlete	Event	Snatch		Clean & Jerk		Total	Rank
Athlete	Event	Result	Rank	Result	Rank	Total	Rank
Jürgen Spieß	Men's −105 kg	172	10	202	9	374	9
Matthias Steiner	Men's +105 kg	192	7	—	—	192	DNF
Almir Velagic	Men's +105 kg	192	7	234	7	426	8
Julia Rohde	Women's −53 kg	85	10	108	11	193	11
Christin Ulrich	Women's −58 kg	93	14	114	13	207	13

== Wrestling ==
Key:

- VT – Victory by Fall.
- PP – Decision by Points – the loser with technical points.
- PO – Decision by Points – the loser without technical points.

Men's freestyle

Athlete	Event	Qualification	Round of 16	Quarterfinal	Semifinal	Repechage 1	Repechage 2	Final / BM	
Athlete	Event	Opposition Result	Opposition Result	Opposition Result	Opposition Result	Opposition Result	Opposition Result	Opposition Result	Rank
Tim Schleicher	−60 kg	Bye	Asgarov (AZE); L 1–3^{PP}	did not advance		Bye	Yumoto (JPN); L 1–3^{PP}	Did not advance	10
Nick Matuhin	−120 kg	Bye	Taymazov (UZB); L 0–3 ^{PO}	did not advance		Bye	Ghasemi (IRI); L 0–3 ^{PO}	Did not advance	17

Men's Greco-Roman

Athlete	Event	Qualification	Round of 16	Quarterfinal	Semifinal	Repechage 1	Repechage 2	Final / BM	
Athlete	Event	Opposition Result	Opposition Result	Opposition Result	Opposition Result	Opposition Result	Opposition Result	Opposition Result	Rank
Frank Stäbler	−66 kg	Bye	Lőrincz (HUN); L 1–3^{PP}	did not advance		Bye	Lester (USA); W 3–0 ^{PO}	Tskhadaia (GEO); L 1–3^{PP}	5

Women's freestyle

Athlete	Event	Qualification	Round of 16	Quarterfinal	Semifinal	Repechage 1	Repechage 2	Final / BM	
Athlete	Event	Opposition Result	Opposition Result	Opposition Result	Opposition Result	Opposition Result	Opposition Result	Opposition Result	Rank
Alexandra Engelhardt	−48 kg	Bye	Caripá (VEN); L 1–3 ^{PP}	did not advance					11
