= Regina Sergeeva =

German rhythmic gymnast

- Born: 2 July 1994 (age 32) Sigmaringen, Germany
- Height: 166 cm (5 ft 5 in)

Gymnastics career
- Discipline: Rhythmic gymnastics
- Country represented: Germany (2009-2012)
- Club: TSG Söflingen
- Head coaches: Natalia Stsiapanava, Ekaterina Kotelikova
- Retired: yes

Regina Sergeeva (born 2 July 1994) is a former German rhythmic gymnast. She represented her country in international competitions.

== Career ==
Sergeeva trained at the DTB National Team Center Fellbach (Federal Training Center for Rhythmic Gymnastics and Sports Boarding School). She competed for TSG Söflingen and was coached by Natalia Stsiapanava, Ekaterina Kotelikova and Vladimir Komkov. Her best apparatus was ball. Sergeeva grew up in Ulm and took up the sport at her home club, TSG Söflingen, initially, she was mainly active as an individual gymnast and she was the runner-up championship in the juniors with ball. In addition, she was also active as a group gymnast and belonged to the national top with the schoolchildren's group of the Swabian Gymnastics Federation. She first took part in a major competition when she was part of the national junior group at the European Championships in 2009 in Baku, where they finished 9th.

In 2010 Regina became a senior, integrating the national group. The European Championships in Bremen were Sergeeva's first championships as a senior. With Cathrin Puhl, Camilla Pfeffer, Sara Radman, Karolina Raskina and Mira Bimperling, she missed a medal in the team competition as Germany finished in 4th place behind Russia, Italy and Belarus. With Pfeffer, Puhl, Radmann and Bimperling she also finished 4th in the apparatus finals. The World Championships in Moscow followed in the autumn of that year, where Sergeeva with Pfeffer, Puhl, Radman and Bimperling finished 8th in the team competition and 5th in the two apparatus finals. At the World Championships a year later in Montpellier, she finished 6th with Camilla Pfeffer, Cathrin Puhl, Nicole Müller, Sara Radman and Mira Bimperling in the group All-Around, as well as 7th with 5 balls and 5th with 3 ribbons + 2 hoops. With sixth place, the team qualified directly for the 2012 Summer Olympics in London. Shortly before the games, however, she left the group due to injuries and officially ending her sport career.
