= Camilla Pfeffer =

German rhythmic gymnast

- Born: 24 January 1993 (age 33) Filderstadt, Germany

Gymnastics career
- Discipline: Rhythmic gymnastics
- Country represented: Germany (2008–2012)
- Club: TSV Schmiden
- Head coaches: Natalia Stsiapanava, Ekaterina Kotelikova
- Retired: yes

Camilla Pfeffer (born 24 January 1993 in Filderstadt) is a German former rhythmic gymnast. She competed at the 2012 Summer Olympics.

== Career ==
Camilla Pfeffer trained at the DTB National Team Centre Fellbach-Schmiden (Federal Training Centre for Rhythmic Gymnastics and Sports Boarding School) and lives in Tübingen and Fellbach. The chemistry Ph.D. student at the University of Stuttgart, who does research in the field of asymmetric catalysis in the group of Prof. René Peters, competed for TSV Schmiden and is trained by Natalia Stsiapanava, Ekaterina Kotelikova and Vladimir Komkov. Her best apparatus was ribbon. Pfeffer learned her sport from Nadja Protasova at TSG Tübingen. Her greatest success in the junior category was her participation in the 2008 European Junior Championships in Turin, where she was tenth in the team with Sara Radman.

In 2009, Pfeffer managed the transition to senior. As the captain she was initially the central element around which the newly designed national group was built for the next Olympic Games. Her first international championship as a senior was the World Championships in Mie. There she was 13th with Maike Deuschle, Johanna Gabor, Sara Radman and Karolina Raskina in the group All-Around and 13th with 3 ribbons + 2 ropes, 14th with 5 hoops. At the European Championships in spring 2010 in Bremen, Pfeffer missed out on a medal with Cathrin Puhl, Radman, Mira Bimperling, Raskina and Regina Sergeeva she missed a medal in the team competition as Germany finished in 4th place behind Russia, Italy and Belarus, she also finished 4th in the apparatus finals. In the autumn of that year, at the World Championships followed in Moscow, Pfeffer finished 8th in the team competition and 5th in the two apparatus finals. At the World Championships one year later in Montpellier with Regina Sergeeva, Cathrin Puhl, Nicole Müller, Sara Radman and Mira Bimperling she finished 6th in the group All-Around, as well as 7th with 5 balls and 5th with 3 ribbons + 2 hoops. With sixth place, the team qualified directly for the 2012 Summer Olympics in London. Before the Games, she was still in action at the 2012 European Championships in Nizhny Novgorod. In the group All-Around she reached 9Th place with Judith Hauser, Müller, Radman, Puhl and Bimperling. With the same line-up, the group took 10th place at the Olympic Games in London. After the Olympics, Pfeffer ended her sporting career.

From 2013 Pfeffer works as a trainer at the federal base in Fellbach. Since 2018 she has been coaching the national team group, which won team silver at the 2022 World Championships under her leadership. In 2023 the group won two silver medals (All-Around and 3 ribbons and 2 balls) in Tashkent that, along the bronze won in 2022, were the first World Cup medals for Germany since 2016.
