= Anastasia Kempf =

German rhythmic gymnast (born 1997)

- Born: 30 November 1997 (age 28) Volvograd, Russia

Gymnastics career
- Discipline: Rhythmic gymnastics
- Country represented: Germany (2009-2013)

Anastasia Kempf (born 30 November 1997) is a former German rhythmic gymnast of Russian origin.

== Career ==
Kempf trained at TBG Neulußheim until she moved to the federal base in Fellbach in 2009. At the German Championships in 2010, she could not start due to injury. The following year, she won all competitions in the 14-year-old age group at the German championships and thus became German junior All-Around, hoop, ball, clubs and ribbon champion.

In 2012 Anastasia was able to retain the All-Around title, as well as winning gold with hoop, ball, ribbon and silver with clubs. At the Junior European Championships, Kempf took part in the team competition with Kristina Durbanova, where they finished 11th. Kempf was also 15th with ball and 11th with ribbon.

In 2013, Anastasia Kempf was included in the seniors' national group, which also included Judith Hauser, Anastasija Khmelnytska, Daniela Potapova, Sara Radman and Rana Tokmak, they achieved 9th place in the All-Around at the World Championships in Kyiv and were 7th in the 10 clubs’ final. At the end of 2013, Kempf announced her withdrawal from the national team.
