= Puhl =

Puhl is a surname. Notable people with the name include:

- Sándor Puhl (1955–2021), Hungarian football referee
- Terry Puhl (born 1956), Canadian retired professional baseball outfielder
- Cathrin Puhl born 1994), German rhythmic gymnast
- John Puhl (1876–1900), American professional baseball player from Brooklyn
- Emil Puhl (1889–1962), Nazi economist and banking official during World War II

It may also refer to:

- Puhl & Wagner was the largest German company for the production of glass mosaics and stained glass (Based in Berlin, traded from 1889 to 1969)
