= Judith Hauser =

German rhythmic gymnast

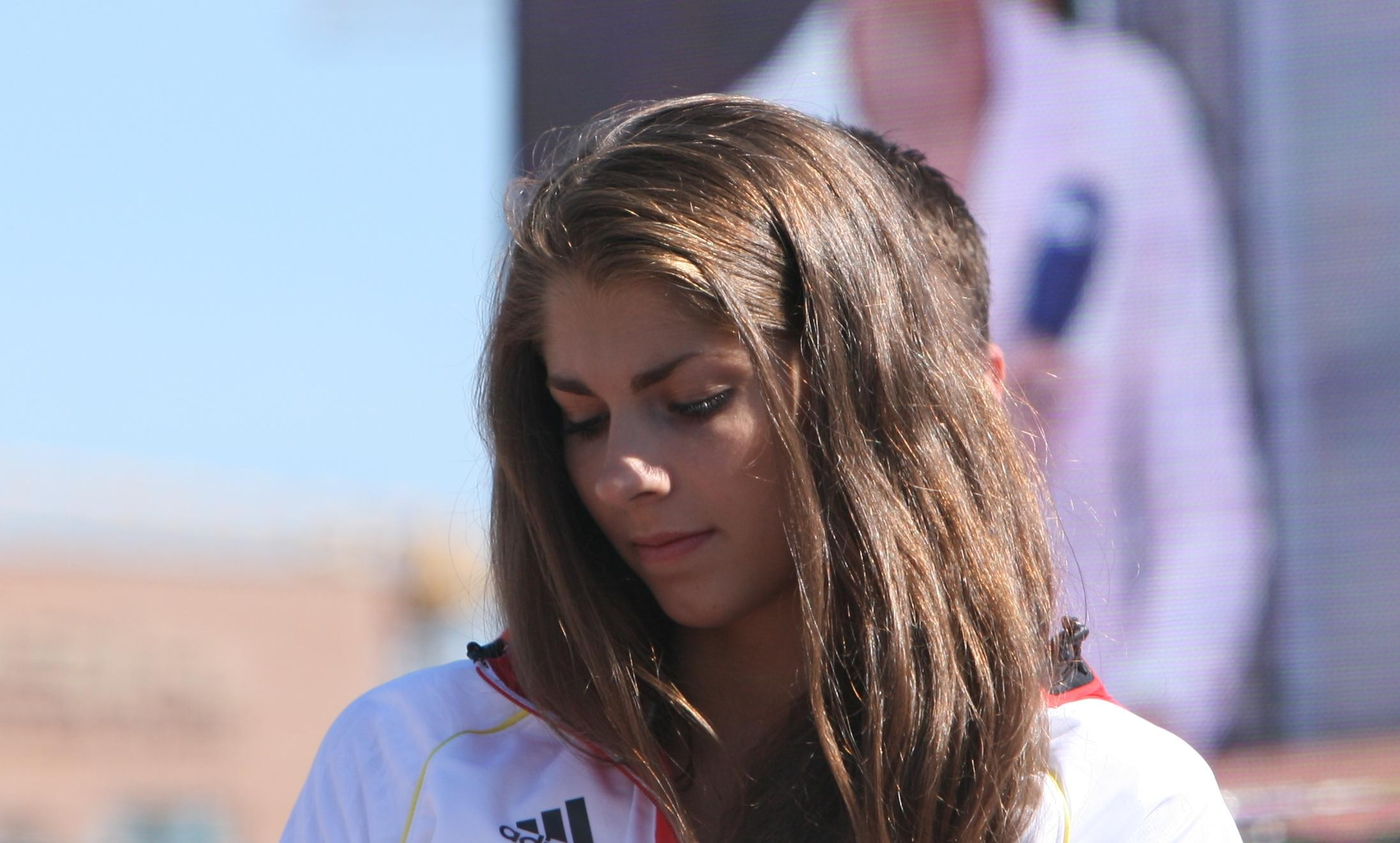
- Judith Hauser in 2012.

Personal information
- Born: 23 September 1992 (age 33)
- Height: 5 ft 8.5 in (174.0 cm)

Gymnastics career
- Discipline: Rhythmic gymnastics
- Country represented: Germany (2009–2014 (?))
- Former countries represented: Hungary

Judith Hauser (born 23 September 1992) is a German group rhythmic gymnast.

She represents her nation at international competitions. She participated at the 2012 Summer Olympics in London. She also competed at world championships, including at the 2009, 2010, 2011, 2013, and 2014 World Rhythmic Gymnastics Championships.
