= Mira Bimperling =

German rhythmic gymnast

- Born: 31 March 1994 (age 32)

Gymnastics career
- Discipline: Rhythmic gymnastics
- Country represented: Germany (2010-2012 (?))

Mira Bimperling (born 31 March 1994) is a German group rhythmic gymnast. She represents her nation at international competitions.

She participated in the 2012 Summer Olympics in London. She also competed at world championships, including at the 2010 and 2011 World Rhythmic Gymnastics Championships.
