= Cathrin Puhl =

German rhythmic gymnast

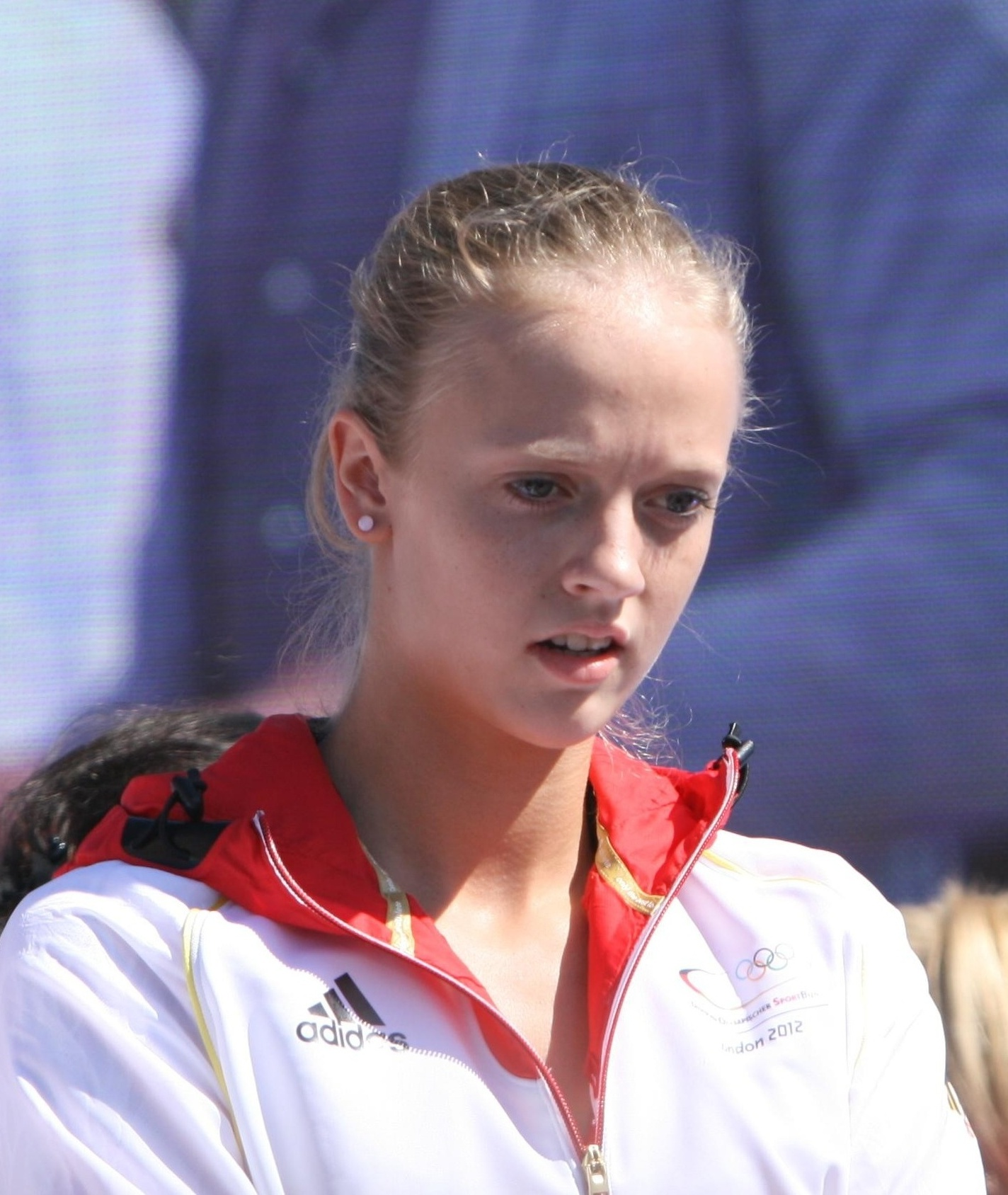
- Puhl in 2012

Personal information
- Born: 4 April 1994 (age 32) Lebach, Germany
- Height: 1.73 m (5 ft 8 in)
- Weight: 52 kg (115 lb)

Sport
- Sport: Rhythmic gymnastics
- Club: TV Rehlingen

Cathrin Puhl (born 4 April 1994) is a German rhythmic gymnast. She competed at the 2012 Summer Olympics and finished in tenth place in the team exercise.
