= Sara Radman =

German rhythmic gymnast

- Born: 20 July 1993 (age 33)

Gymnastics career
- Discipline: Rhythmic gymnastics
- Country represented: Germany; (2009–2013 (?))

Sara Radman (born 20 July 1993) is a German group rhythmic gymnast. She represents her nation at international competitions.

She participated at the 2012 Summer Olympics in London. She also competed at world championships, including at the 2009, 2010, 2011 and 2013 World Rhythmic Gymnastics Championships.
