= Gymnastics at the 2010 Asian Games – Women's rhythmic individual all-around =

Women's individual all-around at the 2010 Asian Games
- Venue: Asian Games Town Gymnasium
- Date: 25–26 November 2010
- Competitors: 30 from 10 nations

Medalists
gold medal	Anna Alyabyeva	Kazakhstan
silver medal	Ulyana Trofimova	Uzbekistan
bronze medal	Son Yeon-jae	South Korea

The women's rhythmic individual all-around competition at the 2010 Asian Games in Guangzhou, China was held on 25 and 26 November 2010 at the Asian Games Town Gymnasium.

== Schedule ==
All times are China Standard Time (UTC+08:00)

Date	Time	Event
Thursday, 25 November 2010	09:00	Qualification
Friday, 26 November 2010	09:00	Final

== Results ==
=== Qualification ===
Rank	Athlete	Rope (rhythmic gymnastics)	Hoop (rhythmic gymnastics)	Ball (rhythmic gymnastics)	Ribbon (rhythmic gymnastics)	Total
1	Anna Alyabyeva (KAZ)	28.450	28.650	~~28.000~~	28.150	85.250
2	Ulyana Trofimova (UZB)	26.600	27.600	26.900	~~26.550~~	81.100
3	Marina Petrakova (KAZ)	26.600	26.750	26.600	~~26.450~~	79.950
4	Son Yeon-jae (KOR)	~~26.050~~	26.450	26.350	26.500	79.300
5	Yuria Onuki (JPN)	~~25.450~~	25.900	26.250	26.300	78.450
6	Deng Senyue (CHN)	26.200	~~24.750~~	26.050	25.450	77.700
7	Runa Yamaguchi (JPN)	25.450	25.450	25.800	~~25.400~~	76.700
8	Dou Baobao (CHN)	25.700	25.000	25.900	~~23.900~~	76.600
9	Djamila Rakhmatova (UZB)	~~25.050~~	25.550	25.700	25.250	76.500
10	Mizana Ismailova (KAZ)	25.100	25.600	25.800		76.500
11	Shin Soo-ji (KOR)	~~24.100~~	25.350	25.400	24.950	75.700
12	Zamirajon Sanokulova (UZB)	~~24.600~~	24.750	25.400	24.750	74.900
13	Riko Anakubo (JPN)	24.400		25.250	25.200	74.850
14	Gim Yun-hee (KOR)	23.950	24.750		25.150	73.850
15	Elaine Koon (MAS)	23.900	~~23.100~~	24.900	24.250	73.050
16	Tharatip Sridee (THA)	23.800	~~23.350~~	25.000	24.200	73.000
17	Nur Hidayah Abdul Wahid (MAS)	24.050	~~22.500~~	24.450	23.150	71.650
18	Ainura Sharshembieva (KGZ)	24.150	24.000	22.500	~~21.450~~	70.650
19	Sirirat Lueprasert (THA)	21.800	21.750	~~19.800~~	23.100	66.650
20	Maria Recinto (PHI)	21.600	20.400	20.250	~~19.550~~	62.250
21	Tanita Akkozova (KGZ)	19.950	20.800	~~18.450~~	19.700	60.450
22	Anastasiia Kurdenkova (KGZ)	19.700	19.750	19.450	~~18.850~~	58.900
23	Samia Hassan (QAT)	~~18.900~~	19.550	19.200	19.850	58.600
24	Peng Linyi (CHN)	24.300			23.800	48.100
25	Hou Yanan (CHN)		22.950	25.050		48.000
26	Manee Patanapongpibul (THA)	21.200	20.450			41.650
27	Panjarat Prawatyotin (THA)			14.050	22.300	36.350
28	Lee Kyung-hwa (KOR)			24.900		24.900
29	Natsuki Konishi (JPN)		24.750			24.750
30	Madina Mukanova (KAZ)				24.350	24.350

=== Final ===
Rank	Athlete	Rope (rhythmic gymnastics)	Hoop (rhythmic gymnastics)	Ball (rhythmic gymnastics)	Ribbon (rhythmic gymnastics)	Total
1st place, gold medalist(s)	Anna Alyabyeva (KAZ)	28.450	28.650	28.200	26.150	111.450
2nd place, silver medalist(s)	Ulyana Trofimova (UZB)	26.900	27.850	27.500	27.200	109.450
3rd place, bronze medalist(s)	Son Yeon-jae (KOR)	26.900	27.000	27.450	27.100	108.450
4	Marina Petrakova (KAZ)	26.700	26.750	26.850	26.700	107.000
5	Deng Senyue (CHN)	26.450	26.150	26.600	26.150	105.350
6	Dou Baobao (CHN)	25.850	25.550	26.250	25.800	103.450
7	Runa Yamaguchi (JPN)	25.400	25.850	25.850	26.100	103.200
8	Yuria Onuki (JPN)	25.800	25.000	26.100	26.250	103.150
9	Djamila Rakhmatova (UZB)	25.500	25.700	25.650	25.600	102.450
10	Shin Soo-ji (KOR)	25.250	25.700	25.200	26.000	102.150
11	Elaine Koon (MAS)	24.050	24.050	25.300	24.500	97.900
12	Nur Hidayah Abdul Wahid (MAS)	25.050	24.400	24.450	23.950	97.850
13	Tharatip Sridee (THA)	23.650	24.400	24.900	24.800	97.750
14	Ainura Sharshembieva (KGZ)	22.900	24.250	23.550	23.650	94.350
15	Sirirat Lueprasert (THA)	23.300	22.000	20.850	22.600	88.750
16	Maria Recinto (PHI)	21.950	22.050	21.750	20.000	85.750
17	Tanita Akkozova (KGZ)	20.450	19.650	18.700	18.350	77.150
18	Samia Hassan (QAT)	19.100	19.550	19.100	19.120	76.950
