= Gymnastics at the 2010 Asian Games – Women's rhythmic team =

Women's team at the 2010 Asian Games
- Venue: Asian Games Town Gymnasium
- Date: 25 November 2010
- Competitors: 26 from 7 nations

Medalists
gold medal	Kazakhstan; Anna Alyabyeva, Mizana Ismailova, Madina Mukanova, Marina Petrakova
silver medal	Uzbekistan; Djamila Rakhmatova, Zamirajon Sanokulova, Ulyana Trofimova
bronze medal	Japan; Riko Anakubo, Natsuki Konishi, Yuria Onuki, Runa Yamaguchi

The women's rhythmic team competition at the 2010 Asian Games in Guangzhou, China was held on 25 November 2010 at the Asian Games Town Gymnasium.

== Schedule ==
All times are China Standard Time (UTC+08:00)

Date	Time	Event
Thursday, 25 November 2010	09:00	Final

== Results ==
Rank	Team	Rope (rhythmic gymnastics)	Hoop (rhythmic gymnastics)	Ball (rhythmic gymnastics)	Ribbon (rhythmic gymnastics)	Total
1st place, gold medalist(s)	Kazakhstan (KAZ)	55.050	81.000	80.400	54.600	271.050
	Anna Alyabyeva	28.450	28.650	28.000	28.150	
	Mizana Ismailova	~~25.100~~	25.600	25.800		
	Madina Mukanova				~~24.350~~	
	Marina Petrakova	26.600	26.750	26.600	26.450	
2nd place, silver medalist(s)	Uzbekistan (UZB)	51.650	53.150	78.000	76.550	259.350
	Djamila Rakhmatova	25.050	25.550	25.700	25.250	
	Zamirajon Sanokulova	~~24.600~~	~~24.750~~	25.400	24.750	
	Ulyana Trofimova	26.600	27.600	26.900	26.550	
3rd place, bronze medalist(s)	Japan (JPN)	50.900	51.350	77.300	76.900	256.450
	Riko Anakubo	~~24.400~~		25.250	25.200	
	Natsuki Konishi		~~24.750~~			
	Yuria Onuki	25.450	25.900	26.250	26.300	
	Runa Yamaguchi	25.450	25.450	25.800	25.400	
4	South Korea (KOR)	26.050	76.550	76.650	76.600	255.850
	Gim Yun-hee	~~23.950~~	24.750		25.150	
	Lee Kyung-hwa			24.900		
	Shin Soo-ji	~~24.100~~	25.350	25.400	24.950	
	Son Yeon-jae	26.050	26.450	26.350	26.500	
5	China (CHN)	76.200	49.750	77.000	49.350	252.300
	Deng Senyue	26.200	24.750	26.050	25.450	
	Dou Baobao	25.700	25.000	25.900	23.900	
	Hou Yanan		~~22.950~~	25.050		
	Peng Linyi	24.300			~~23.800~~	
6	Thailand (THA)	66.800	65.550	25.000	69.600	226.950
	Sirirat Lueprasert	21.800	21.750	~~19.800~~	23.100	
	Manee Patanapongpibul	21.200	20.450			
	Panjarat Prawatyotin			~~14.050~~	22.300	
	Tharatip Sridee	23.800	23.350	25.000	24.200	
7	Kyrgyzstan (KGZ)	63.800	64.550	41.950	41.150	211.450
	Tanita Akkozova	19.950	20.800	~~18.450~~	19.700	
	Anastasiia Kurdenkova	19.700	19.750	19.450	~~18.850~~	
	Ainura Sharshembieva	24.150	24.000	22.500	21.450	
