= Lee Kyung-hwa =

South Korean rhythmic gymnast

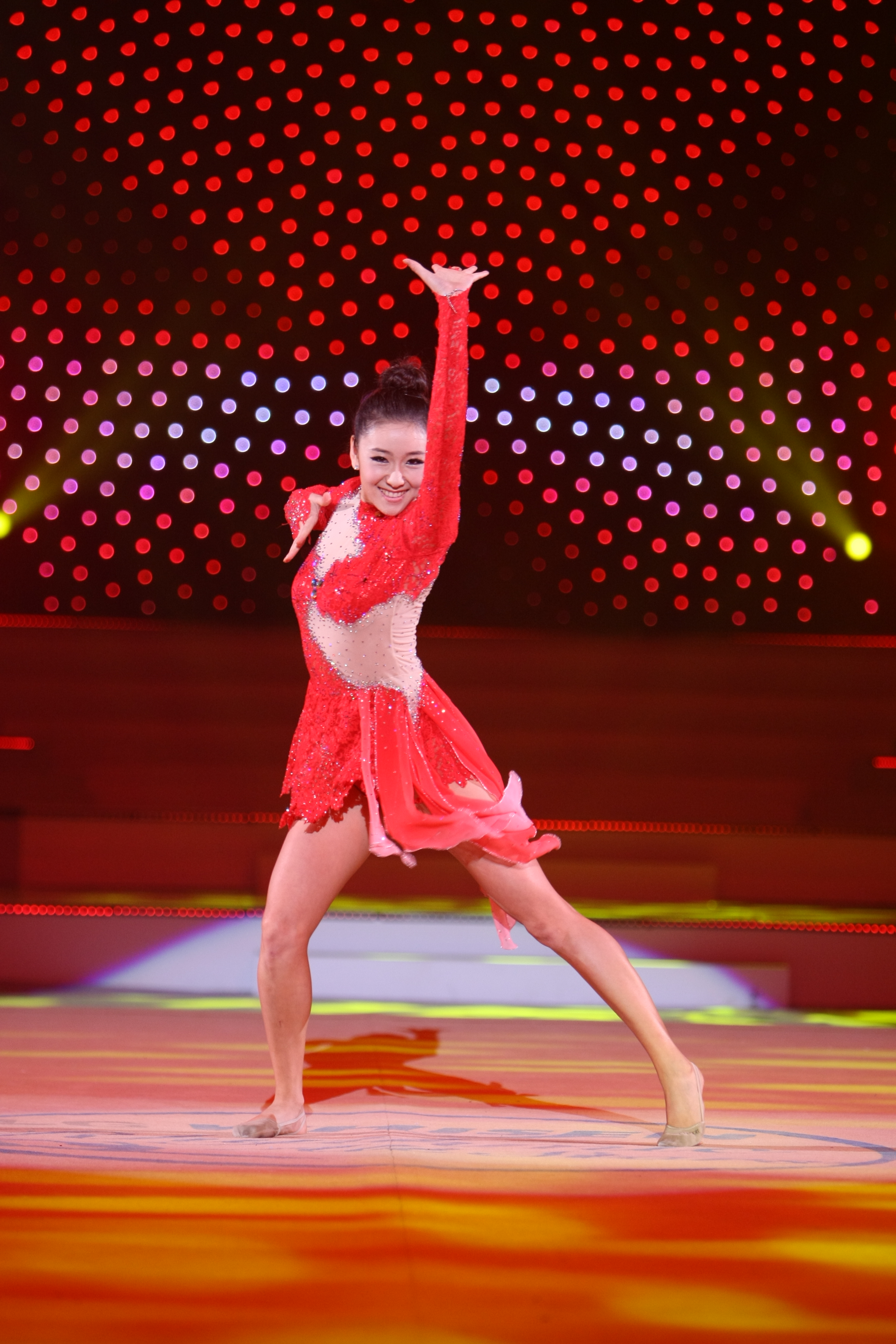

Personal information
- Born: 3 June 1988 (age 38)

Gymnastics career
- Discipline: Rhythmic gymnastics
- Country represented: South Korea; (2004-2009)
- Retired: yes
Medal record
Rhythmic Gymnastics
Representing South Korea
Asian Championships
Silver medal – second place	2009 Astana	Team
Bronze medal – third place	2006 Surat	Clubs

Lee Kyung-hwa (Korean: 이경화; born 3 June 1988) is a South Korean former rhythmic gymnast and musical actress. She represented her country in international competitions.

== Career ==
Lee took up rhythmic gymnastics in her second year of elementary school, as she fell in love with rhythmic gymnastics that she happened to see on TV. She made her senior debut in 2004, when she competed at the Asian Championships where she took 8th place in the All-Around and 7th with ball. A year later she finished 54th in the All-Around at the 2005 World Championships in Baku.

In 2006 she took part in the Asian Championships in Surat, winning bronze with clubs tied with Yukari Murata and Lai Ying-Tzu. In December of the same year she finished 8th in teams, along Lee Ji-ae, Sin Un-jin and Yoo Seong-oeun, and 11th in the All-Around at the Asian Games in Doha. At the 2007 World Championships she took 51st place in the All-Around.

In 2009 she took 50th place in the World Championships in Mie, Japan. A month later, in October she won team silver along Kim Yun-hee, Shin Soo-ji and Sin Un-jin, at the Asian Championships.

Her last competition was the team event at the 2010 Asian Games, where she only competed with ball, ending 4th along Gim Yun-hee, Shin Soo-ji and Son Yeon-jae.

After retiring from her athletic career in 2010, she turned to musical theatre.
