= 2009 Asian Rhythmic Gymnastics Championships =

International rhythmic gymnastics competition

The 4th Seniors Rhythmic Gymnastics Asian Championships was held in Astana, Kazakhstan during 15 – 18 October 2009.

== Medal winners ==
Event	Gold	Silver	Bronze
Team
All-around	Kazakhstan; Anna Alyabyeva; Mizana Ismailova; Marina Petrakova; Aliya Yussupova	South Korea; Kim Yun-hee; Lee Kyung-hwa; Shin Soo-ji; Sin Un-jin	Uzbekistan; Veronika Esipova; Djamila Rahmatova; Ulyana Trofimova; Kamila Tukhtaeva
Individual
All-around	Aliya Yussupova; Kazakhstan	Anna Alyabyeva; Kazakhstan	Shin Soo-ji; South Korea
Rope	Aliya Yussupova; Kazakhstan	Anna Alyabyeva; Kazakhstan	Ulyana Trofimova; Uzbekistan
Hoop	Aliya Yussupova; Kazakhstan	Anna Alyabyeva; Kazakhstan	Ulyana Trofimova; Uzbekistan
Ball	Aliya Yussupova; Kazakhstan	Anna Alyabyeva; Kazakhstan	Shin Soo-ji; South Korea
Ribbon	Aliya Yussupova; Kazakhstan	Anna Alyabyeva; Kazakhstan	Runa Yamaguchi; Japan

== Medal table ==
Rank	Nation	Gold	Silver	Bronze	Total
1	Kazakhstan (KAZ)	6	5	0	11
2	South Korea (KOR)	0	1	2	3
3	Uzbekistan (UZB)	0	0	3	3
4	Japan (JPN)	0	0	1	1
Totals (4 entries)		6	6	6	18

== Results ==
=== Team ===
The team final was held on 16 October 2010. The team final score was the total of top 10 scores.

Rank	Nation	Rope (rhythmic gymnastics)	Hoop (rhythmic gymnastics)	Ball (rhythmic gymnastics)	Ribbon (rhythmic gymnastics)	Final Total
1st place, gold medalist(s)	Kazakhstan	77.575	80.000	80.000	80.100	267.100
2nd place, silver medalist(s)	South Korea	73.975	73.325	73.950	67.785	246.300
3rd place, bronze medalist(s)	Uzbekistan	71.175	69.175	73.750	72.725	241.950
4	Japan	68.950	72.725	68.900	72.800	239.425
5	Thailand	59.700	64.100	63.275	59.325	209.675
6	Kyrgyzstan	59.025	62.075	59.875	59.950	203.925
7	India	40.425	37.150	39.850	41.250	134.775

==== Details ====
Rank	Nation	Gymnast	Rope (rhythmic gymnastics)	Hoop (rhythmic gymnastics)	Ball (rhythmic gymnastics)	Ribbon (rhythmic gymnastics)	Total
1st place, gold medalist(s)	Kazakhstan	Aliya Yussupova	27.000	27.475	27.350	27.450	267.100
1st place, gold medalist(s)	Kazakhstan	Anna Alyabyeva	~~25.825~~	26.675	26.700	26.775	267.100
1st place, gold medalist(s)	Kazakhstan	Marina Petrakova	-	25.850	25.950	25.875	267.100
1st place, gold medalist(s)	Kazakhstan	Mizana Ismailova	~~24.750~~	-	-	-	267.100
2nd place, silver medalist(s)	South Korea	Shin Soo-ji	25.625	24.375	25.400	25.050	246.300
2nd place, silver medalist(s)	South Korea	Lee Kyung-hwa	24.450	24.700	24.025	~~21.675~~	246.300
2nd place, silver medalist(s)	South Korea	Gim Yun-hee	23.900	24.250	24.525	-	246.300
2nd place, silver medalist(s)	South Korea	Sin Un-jin	-	-	-	~~21.600~~	246.300
3rd place, bronze medalist(s)	Uzbekistan	Ulyana Trofimova	24.625	23.425	25.950	25.300	241.950
3rd place, bronze medalist(s)	Uzbekistan	Djamila Rahmatova	23.875	23.550	24.700	24.075	241.950
3rd place, bronze medalist(s)	Uzbekistan	Veronika Esipova	~~22.675~~	-	23.100	-	241.950
3rd place, bronze medalist(s)	Uzbekistan	Kamila Tukhtaeva		~~22.200~~	-	23.350	241.950
4	Japan	Riko Anakubo	-	24.450	23.950	23.800	239.425
4	Japan	Runa Yamaguchi	~~22.300~~	24.425	-	24.650	239.425
4	Japan	Hiromi Nakatsu	22.800	23.850	23.300		239.425
4	Japan	Nanase Shoji	23.850	-	~~21.650~~	24.350	239.425
5	Thailand	Tharatip Sridee	21.775	22.700	23.225	21.150	209.675
5	Thailand	Chariya Srisamart	~~18.750~~	21.000	20.950	~~17.975~~	209.675
5	Thailand	Thutpicha Suwanprapaporn	19.175	20.400	-	20.200	209.675
5	Thailand	Manee Patanapongpibul	-	-	19.100	-	209.675
6	Kyrgyzstan	Ainura Sharhembieva	21.325	21.650	22.325	22.050	203.925
6	Kyrgyzstan	Alina Luzgina	~~18.575~~	20.900	~~18.425~~	18.950	203.925
6	Kyrgyzstan	Anastasia Kurdenkova	-	19.525	19.125	18.950	203.925
6	Kyrgyzstan	Elizaveta Moskalik	19.125	-	-	-	203.925
7	India	Ganesh Sawant Siddhi	14.750	13.250	-	13.375	134.775
7	India	Keerat Kular	13.200	-	13.225	13.950	134.775
7	India	Prabhjot Bajwa	-	~~12.100~~	13.225	13.925	134.775
7	India	Nishtha Nitin Shah	12.475	~~11.800~~	13.400	-	134.775
Individuals
-	Malaysia	Elaine Koon	21.975	21.850	23.350	22.950	

=== Individual All-around ===
Rank	Gymnast	Nation	Rope (rhythmic gymnastics)	Hoop (rhythmic gymnastics)	Ball (rhythmic gymnastics)	Ribbon (rhythmic gymnastics)	Total
1st place, gold medalist(s)	Aliya Yussupova	Kazakhstan	27.450	27.900	27.850	27.700	110.900
2nd place, silver medalist(s)	Anna Alyabyeva	Kazakhstan	27.300	26.850	26.950	27.150	108.250
3rd place, bronze medalist(s)	Shin Soo-ji	South Korea	26.400	26.600	26.425	26.125	105.550
4	Ulyana Trofimova	Uzbekistan	26.150	25.725	26.375	25.650	103.900
5	Runa Yamaguchi	Japan	24.300	25.500	25.100	25.000	99.900
6	Djamila Rahmatova	Uzbekistan	25.100	24.750	25.050	24.100	99.000
7	Riko Anakubo	Japan	24.050	24.950	25.600	24.075	98.675
8	Elaine Koon	Malaysia	23.700	24.650	24.400	23.525	96.275
9	Lee Kyung-hwa	South Korea	24.225	23.225	23.750	23.100	94.300
10	Tharatip Sridee	Thailand	22.450	23.900	23.975	23.250	93.575
11	Chariya Srisamart	Thailand	21.850	23.050	21.400	20.725	87.025
12	Ainura Sharhembieva	Kyrgyzstan	22.150	22.450	21.450	20.200	86.250
13	Alina Luzgina	Kyrgyzstan	20.550	20.300	19.150	18.950	78.950
14	Ganesh Sawant Siddhi	India	13.900	14.300	13.350	13.725	55.275
15	Keerat Kular	India	13.375	13.250	13.250	14.400	54.275

=== Individual Rope ===
Rank	Gymnast	Nation	Score
1st place, gold medalist(s)	Aliya Yussupova	Kazakhstan	27.800
2nd place, silver medalist(s)	Anna Alyabyeva	Kazakhstan	27.375
3rd place, bronze medalist(s)	Ulyana Trofimova	Uzbekistan	26.725
4	Shin Soo-ji	South Korea	25.875
5	Nanase Shoji	Japan	25.000
6	Djamila Rahmatova	Uzbekistan	24.950
7	Hiromi Nakatsu	Japan	24.750
8	Lee Kyung-hwa	South Korea	23.700

=== Individual Hoop ===
Rank	Gymnast	Nation	Score
1st place, gold medalist(s)	Aliya Yussupova	Kazakhstan	28.250
2nd place, silver medalist(s)	Anna Alyabyeva	Kazakhstan	27.800
3rd place, bronze medalist(s)	Ulyana Trofimova	Uzbekistan	26.750
4	Shin Soo-ji	South Korea	26.550
5	Runa Yamaguchi	Japan	26.300
6	Riko Anakubo	Japan	25.700
7	Djamila Rahmatova	Uzbekistan	25.125
8	Lee Kyung-hwa	South Korea	23.550

=== Individual Ball ===
Rank	Gymnast	Nation	Score
1st place, gold medalist(s)	Aliya Yussupova	Kazakhstan	28.200
2nd place, silver medalist(s)	Anna Alyabyeva	Kazakhstan	27.625
3rd place, bronze medalist(s)	Shin Soo-ji	South Korea	26.900
4	Ulyana Trofimova	Uzbekistan	26.200
5	Riko Anakubo	Japan	26.050
6	Kim Yun-hee	South Korea	24.900
7	Djamila Rahmatova	Uzbekistan	24.750
8	Elaine Koon	Malaysia	24.625

=== Individual Ribbon ===
Rank	Gymnast	Nation	Score
1st place, gold medalist(s)	Aliya Yussupova	Kazakhstan	28.050
2nd place, silver medalist(s)	Anna Alyabyeva	Kazakhstan	27.750
3rd place, bronze medalist(s)	Runa Yamaguchi	Japan	27.100
4	Shin Soo-ji	South Korea	26.100
5	Ulyana Trofimova	Uzbekistan	24.700
6	Djamila Rahmatova	Uzbekistan	24.650
7	Nanase Shoji	Japan	24.600
8	Elaine Koon	Malaysia	23.450
