= Elena Nefedova =

Russian rhythmic gymnast

- Born: July 2, 1974 (age 51); Moscow, RSFSR, USSR
- Occupation: Rhythmic Gymnastics coach
- Known for: Russian rhythmic gymnastics trainer, member of Technical Committee in RG, and expert in body difficulties

Elena Yurievna Nefedova (Russian: Елена Юрьевна Нефедова; born July 2, 1974, in Moscow, RSFSR, Soviet Union) is an honored Master of Sports coach of Russia in Rhythmic gymnastics.

== Coaching career ==
Since 2003, she works as a coach of the Russian national team, and is a licensed official judge of the international category of FIG in rhythmic gymnastics. Nefedova is also member of the Technical Committee in RG and expert in body difficulties, elected by the European Union of Gymnastics Executive Committee.

She has coached multiple World medalist gymnasts.

== Notable students ==
- Olga Kapranova - 2005 World all-around champion, 2007 World all-around bronze medalist, 2008 European all-around bronze medalist.
- Son Yeon-Jae - 2015 Summer Universiade all-around champion, first South Korean to medal at the World Championships.
- Sumire Kita - 2017 Asian Championships bronze medalist, Japanese rhythmic gymnast.
- Sakura Hayakawa - 2015 Asian Championships all-around bronze medalist, Japanese rhythmic gymnast.
- Shin Soo-ji - 2009 Asian Championships all-around bronze medalist, South Korean rhythmic gymnast.
- Vera Tugolukova, First Cypriot rhythmic gymnast to win a gold medal in an individual apparatus final at the FIG World Cup series in 2025 in Baku.
