= Nachi Misawa =

Japanese rhythmic gymnast

- Born: 13 November 1989 (age 36) Yamagata, Japan

Gymnastics career
- Discipline: Rhythmic gymnastics
- Country represented: Japan (2007-2009 (?))

Nachi Misawa (三澤 樹知, Misawa Nachi; born 13 November 1989) is a Japanese group rhythmic gymnast. She represents her nation at international competitions.

She participated at the 2008 Summer Olympics in Beijing. She also competed at world championships, including at the 2007 and 2009 World Rhythmic Gymnastics Championships.

Misawa attended the Tokyo Women's College of Physical Education. While their rhythmic gymnastics club held a training camp in Yamagata Prefecture every year, in 2011, the camp was almost cancelled due to the aftermath of the 2011 Tōhoku earthquake and tsunami. The Yamagata Rhythmic Gymnastics Association requested that the training camp be held once the gymnasium, which had been in use as an evacuation center, became available again. The club held a free showcase during the camp. Misawa was one of the members who attended. Along with her fellow Yamagata native teammate Nanase Shoji, she stated ahead of the showcase, "We're hearing that many people from Tōhoku will come to watch, so we want to extend cheer to the victims through our performances."
