= Gymnastics at the 2012 Summer Olympics – Women's rhythmic individual all-around =

Women's rhythmic individual all-around at the Games of the XXX Olympiad
- Venue: Wembley Arena
- Date: 9–11 August
- Competitors: 24 from 21 nations
- Winning score: 116.900

Medalists
1st place, gold medalist(s)		Evgeniya Kanaeva	Russia
2nd place, silver medalist(s)		Darya Dmitriyeva	Russia
3rd place, bronze medalist(s)		Liubov Charkashyna	Belarus

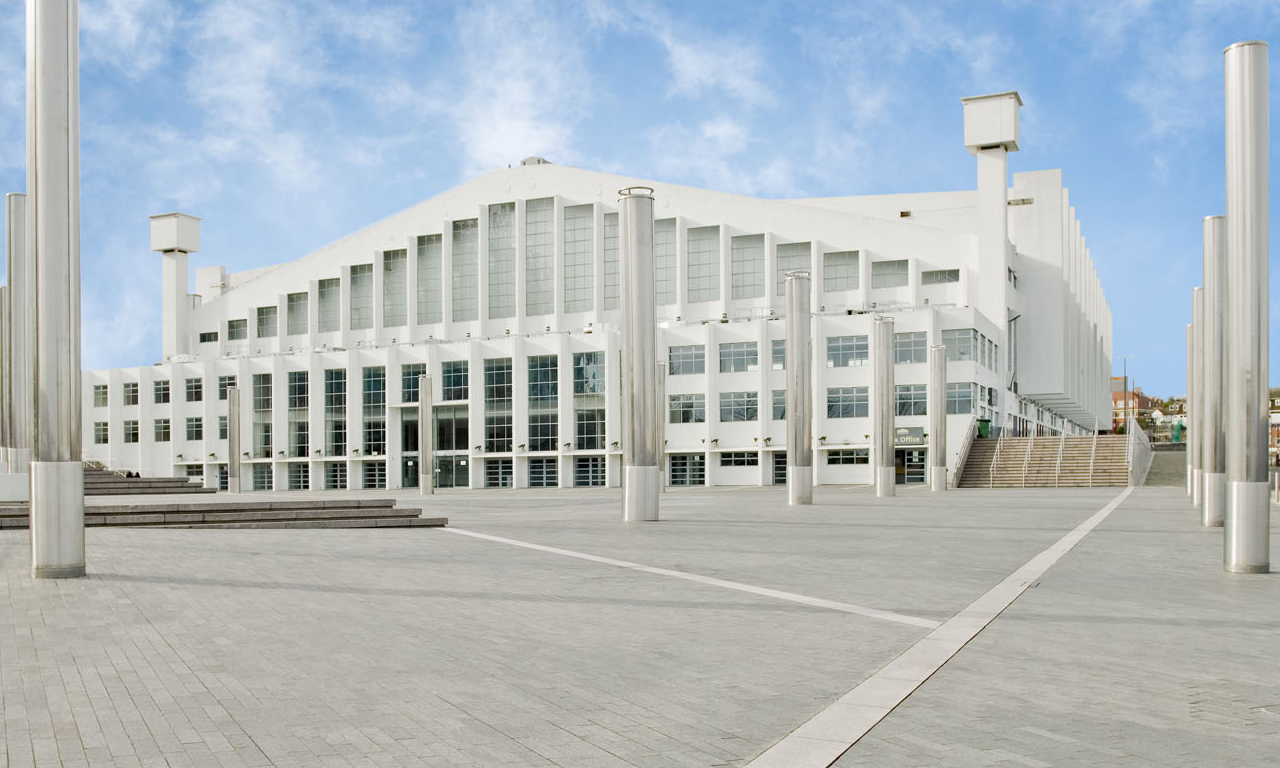
Wembley Arena

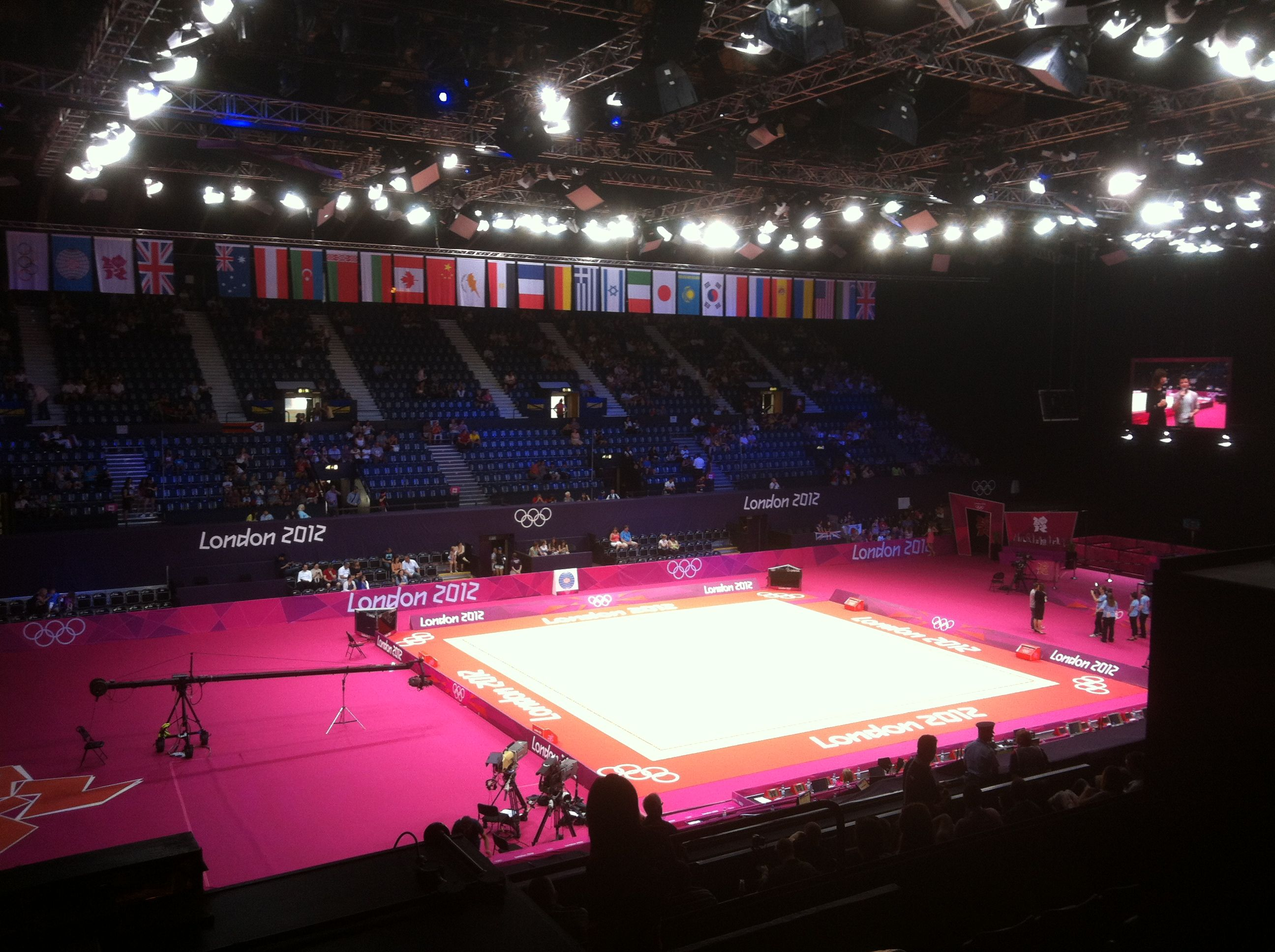
Women's rhythmic individual all-around

The women's rhythmic individual all-around competition at the 2012 Summer Olympics was held at the Wembley Arena from 9–11 August.

== Competition format ==
The competition consisted of a qualification round and a final round. The top ten gymnasts in the qualification round advanced to the final. In each round, the gymnasts performed four routines (ball, hoop, clubs, and ribbon), with the scores added to give a total.

Six gymnasts returned from the 2008 Olympics, and five of them made it to the final. Among them was Evgeniya Kanaeva of Russia, who became the first gymnast to successfully defend her Olympic title in the event.

== Qualification results ==
Rank	Name	Nation	Ball	Penalty	Hoop	Penalty	Clubs	Penalty	Ribbon	Penalty	Total	Notes
1	Evgeniya Kanaeva	Russia	29.525		28.100		28.975		29.400		116.000	Q
2	Darya Dmitriyeva	Russia	28.800		29.000	0.05	27.800		28.925		114.525	Q
3	Aliya Garayeva	Azerbaijan	28.350		27.450	0.10	27.850		28.200		111.850	Q
4	Silvia Miteva	Bulgaria	27.800		27.700		27.325		28.100		110.925	Q
5	Liubov Charkashyna	Belarus	28.400		28.050		27.450		26.550		110.450	Q
6	Son Yeon-jae	South Korea	27.825		28.075		26.350	0.05	28.050		110.300	Q
7	Alina Maksymenko	Ukraine	28.125		27.300		27.800		26.800		110.025	Q
8	Joanna Mitrosz	Poland	27.250		27.425		27.625		27.450		109.750	Q
9	Neta Rivkin	Israel	26.200	0.45	27.450		27.525		27.725	0.05	108.900	Q
10	Ganna Rizatdinova	Ukraine	26.800	0.10	27.350		27.750		26.950	0.05	108.850	Q
11	Deng Senyue	China	26.800		27.150		27.575		27.300		108.825	
12	Melitina Staniouta	Belarus	26.700		27.500		27.600		26.875		108.675	
13	Delphine Ledoux	France	27.150		27.100		27.250		26.675		108.175	
14	Carolina Rodríguez	Spain	26.625		26.900		27.175		26.100		106.800	
15	Anna Alyabyeva	Kazakhstan	26.575		27.200	0.05	25.250		27.400		106.425	
16	Julieta Cantaluppi	Italy	26.675		25.200		26.850		26.550		105.275	
17	Jana Berezko-Marggrander	Germany	26.575		26.300		27.325		24.900		105.100	
18	Caroline Weber	Austria	25.950		25.925		26.725		26.350		104.950	
19	Chrystalleni Trikomiti	Cyprus	26.250		26.250	0.05	26.375	0.05	25.650	0.05	104.675	
20	Ulyana Trofimova	Uzbekistan	24.625		24.650		23.275	0.10	24.800		97.350	
21	Julie Zetlin	United States	24.450		23.750		24.225	0.05	24.250		96.675	
22	Janine Murray	Australia	23.100		24.350		23.875		25.000		96.325	
23	Yasmine Rostom	Egypt	23.775		23.925	0.20	25.050		23.500		96.250	
24	Francesca Jones	Great Britain	24.550		24.200		21.975		23.900		94.625	

== Final results ==
Rank	Name	Ball	Penalty	Hoop	Penalty	Clubs	Penalty	Ribbon	Penalty	Total
1st place, gold medalist(s)	Evgeniya Kanaeva (RUS)	29.200		29.350		29.450		28.900		116.900
2nd place, silver medalist(s)	Darya Dmitriyeva (RUS)	28.350		28.300	0.05	28.750	0.05	29.100		114.500
3rd place, bronze medalist(s)	Liubov Charkashyna (BLR)	28.000		28.100		27.525	0.05	28.075		111.700
4	Aliya Garayeva (AZE)	27.825		27.925		27.575		28.250		111.575
5	Son Yeon-jae (KOR)	28.325		28.050		26.750		28.350		111.475
6	Alina Maksymenko (UKR)	26.675		27.950		27.550		27.450		109.625
7	Neta Rivkin (ISR)	26.850	0.05	27.350		27.800		27.000		109.000
8	Silvia Miteva (BUL)	27.100	0.05	27.450		26.750		27.650		108.950
9	Joanna Mitrosz (POL)	27.150		27.475		26.850		27.425		108.900
10	Ganna Rizatdinova (UKR)	27.050	0.10	26.750	0.05	27.100		26.500	0.05	107.400
