= Nanase Shoji =

Japanese rhythmic gymnast (born 1989)

- 庄司七瀬
- Born: 1989 (age 36–37) Yamagata, Yamagata Prefecture, Japan

Gymnastics career
- Discipline: Rhythmic gymnastics
- Country represented: Japan
- Retired: Yes

Nanase Shoji (庄司 七瀬; born 1989) is a Japanese retired individual rhythmic gymnast. She now works for Yamagata City Hall.

== Career ==
Shoji was born in Yamagata Prefecture and began training in rhythmic gymnastics there when she was five years old. As a gymnast, she was known for her pivots (spins) as well as her speed and power.

In 2004, she came in second at the Japanese National Middle School Women's Rhythmic Gymnastics Championships. In August 2005, she won her first of three National High School Athletic Championships titles. In September, she competed at the World Cup stage in Varna, Bulgaria, where she placed 5th. That November, she was fourth at the Japanese Championships.

The next year, in May, she competed at the Japanese Youth Championships. She demonstrated her skill with pivots at the competition and won the silver medal, but she said that "I couldn't perform acceptably". She competed at the World Cup stage in Irkutsk in June and finished in 16th place. In August, she won her second National High School Athletic Championships; she was the first rhythmic gymnast to repeat her victory there since Rieko Matsunaga had done so 9 years earlier.

In March 2007, Shoji won the National High School Rhythmic Gymnastics Championships in March. In May, she competed in a selection competition for international competitions, but after making mistakes in her clubs and ribbon routines, she finished in 13th place. Later in May, she placed fourth at the Japanese Youth Championships. In August, she won her third consecutive National High School Athletic Championships. She was the second-ever women's rhythmic gymnast to do so after Kumiko Fumoto did so 31 years before her. Shoji said that she had won her third consecutive title "by chance" and that she had wanted to compete without making mistakes, since it was her last Championships. In November, she placed 9th at the Japanese Championships. Afterward, she expressed hope that she would be selected for the 2009 World Championships, held in Mie, Japan, and stated that she had chosen to attend the Tokyo Women's College of Physical Education, where many Olympic rhythmic gymnasts have studied.

In September 2008, she competed in the National Collegiate Rhythmic Gymnastics Championships and finished in second place. She placed 5th at the National Championships in December.

The next year, she was selected for the 2009 World Games held in Taiwan. She competed there in July; her best result was 16th place in the hoop competition. In August, she won a second silver all-around medal at the National Collegiate Championships, and she won the ribbon final. In October, she participated in the Asian Championships, where she competed with rope (5th place) and ribbon (7th place).

Shoji continued to competed in 2010, but it was a difficult year for her, and she made an unusual number of mistakes in competition.

The Tokyo Women's College of Physical Education Rhythmic Gymnastics Club attends a training camp in Yamagata Prefecture every year. However, in 2011, the camp was almost cancelled due to the aftermath of the 2011 Tōhoku earthquake and tsunami. The Yamagata Rhythmic Gymnastics Association requested that the training camp be held once the gymnasium, which had been in use as an evacuation center, became available again. The club held a free showcase during the camp. Shoji was one of the members who attended. Along with her fellow Yamagata native teammate Nachi Misawa, she stated ahead of the showcase, "We're hearing that many people from Tōhoku will come to watch, so we want to extend cheer to the victims through our performances."

In August 2011, she finished 10th at her final National Collegiate Championships. The following month, she was accepted as a Yamagata city employee through a special selection process. She said of her new position, "Until now, I was in the position of being supported by Yamagata. I want to repay that."
