= 2006 Asian Rhythmic Gymnastics Championships =

International rhythmic gymnastics competition

The 2006 Rhythmic Gymnastics Asian Championships was held in Surat, India, 30 July – 3 August 2006.

== Medal winners ==
Event	Gold	Silver	Bronze
Team
All-around	Kazakhstan; Aliya Yussupova; Maiya Zainullina	Japan; Sayaka Nakano; Yukari Murata; Ai Yokochi; Yuria Onuki	China; Xiao Yiming; Ding Yidan; Liang Yuting; Zhao Yue
Individual
All-around	Aliya Yussupova; Kazakhstan	Yukari Murata; Japan	Xiao Yiming; China
Rope	Aliya Yussupova; Kazakhstan	Maiya Zainullina; Kazakhstan	Yukari Murata; Japan
Ball	Aliya Yussupova; Kazakhstan	Sin Un-jin; South Korea	Yukari Murata; Japan
Clubs	Aliya Yussupova; Kazakhstan	Ding Yidan; China	Yukari Murata; Japan
Clubs	Aliya Yussupova; Kazakhstan	Ding Yidan; China	Lee Kyung-Hwa; South Korea
Clubs	Aliya Yussupova; Kazakhstan	Ding Yidan; China	Lai Ying-Tzu; Chinese Taipei
Ribbon	Aliya Yussupova; Kazakhstan	Yukari Murata; Japan	Liang Yuting; China

== Medal table ==
Rank	Nation	Gold	Silver	Bronze	Total
1	Kazakhstan (KAZ)	6	1	0	7
2	Japan (JPN)	0	3	3	6
3	China (CHN)	0	1	3	4
4	South Korea (KOR)	0	1	1	2
5	Chinese Taipei (TPE)	0	0	1	1
Totals (5 entries)		6	6	8	20
