= Yukari Murata =

Japanese rhythmic gymnast and coach

- Born: 9 October 1981 (age 44) Hyogo, Japan

Gymnastics career
- Discipline: Rhythmic gymnastics
- Country represented: Japan; (1998–2006)
Medal record
Rhythmic Gymnastics
Representing Japan
Four Continents Championships
Gold medal – first place	1997 Sydney	All-around
Gold medal – first place	1999 Jacksonville	All-around
Asian Games
Silver medal – second place	2006 Doha	Team
Silver medal – second place	2006 Doha	All-around
Bronze medal – third place	2002 Busan	All-around
Asian Championships
Gold medal – first place	1996 Changsha	Team
Gold medal – first place	2004 Yangzhou	Ribbon
Silver medal – second place	2006 Surat	All-around
Silver medal – second place	2006 Surat	Ribbon
Bronze medal – third place	2006 Surat	Ball
Bronze medal – third place	2006 Surat	Rope
Bronze medal – third place	2006 Surat	Clubs
Bronze medal – third place	2004 Yangzhou	Ball

Yukari Murata (村田 由香里, Murata Yukari; born 9 October 1981) is a Japanese retired individual rhythmic gymnast. She is currently the head of training for rhythmic gymnastics at the Japan Gymnastics Association.

== Career ==
Murata participated at the 2000 Summer Olympics in Sydney and the 2004 Summer Olympics in Athens. She also competed at world championships, including the 2005 World Rhythmic Gymnastics Championships.

== Post-competitive career ==
After her competitive career, she became the head of training for rhythmic gymnastics at the Japan Gymnastics Association. In November 2021, she began training in the national group.

In May 2025, it was reported that gymnasts had complained that Murata was abusive in training, with gymnasts having left the national team because of her impact on their mental health. Four top athletes, including Ayuka Suzuki, left their athletes' housing in February and boycotted their training until they were persuaded to return later that day. The reasons they gave for leaving were her treatment of them as well as sexual harassment from an unnamed male trainer.

Murata was given a leave of absence and a warning but then resumed her position; the Japan Gymnastics Association stated that athletes did not wish for her to be punished or acknowledged as carrying out power harassment. They said their investigation was suspended and would not proceed without a request from the gymnasts. She denied being abusive, but she said that she may have pressured athletes too much and that she did not properly support them mentally, saying that "our communication sometimes slipped out of sync". She also added that she wanted to learn from what had happened. The Japanese Gymnastics Association assigned her two support staff and created more support systems to connect the gymnasts with external resources.

Later that year, under Murata's instruction, the Japanese group won their first-ever all-around World Championships gold medal at the 2025 World Championships held in Rio de Janeiro. After the competition, however, the cosmetics brand Pola, which had sponsored rhythmic gymnasts for 18 years, withdrew their sponsorship as a result of the unresolved allegations of harassment, though they noted they might restart their sponsorship if more safeguards were implemented.
