= Gim Yun-hee =

South Korean rhythmic gymnast (born 1991)

- 김윤희
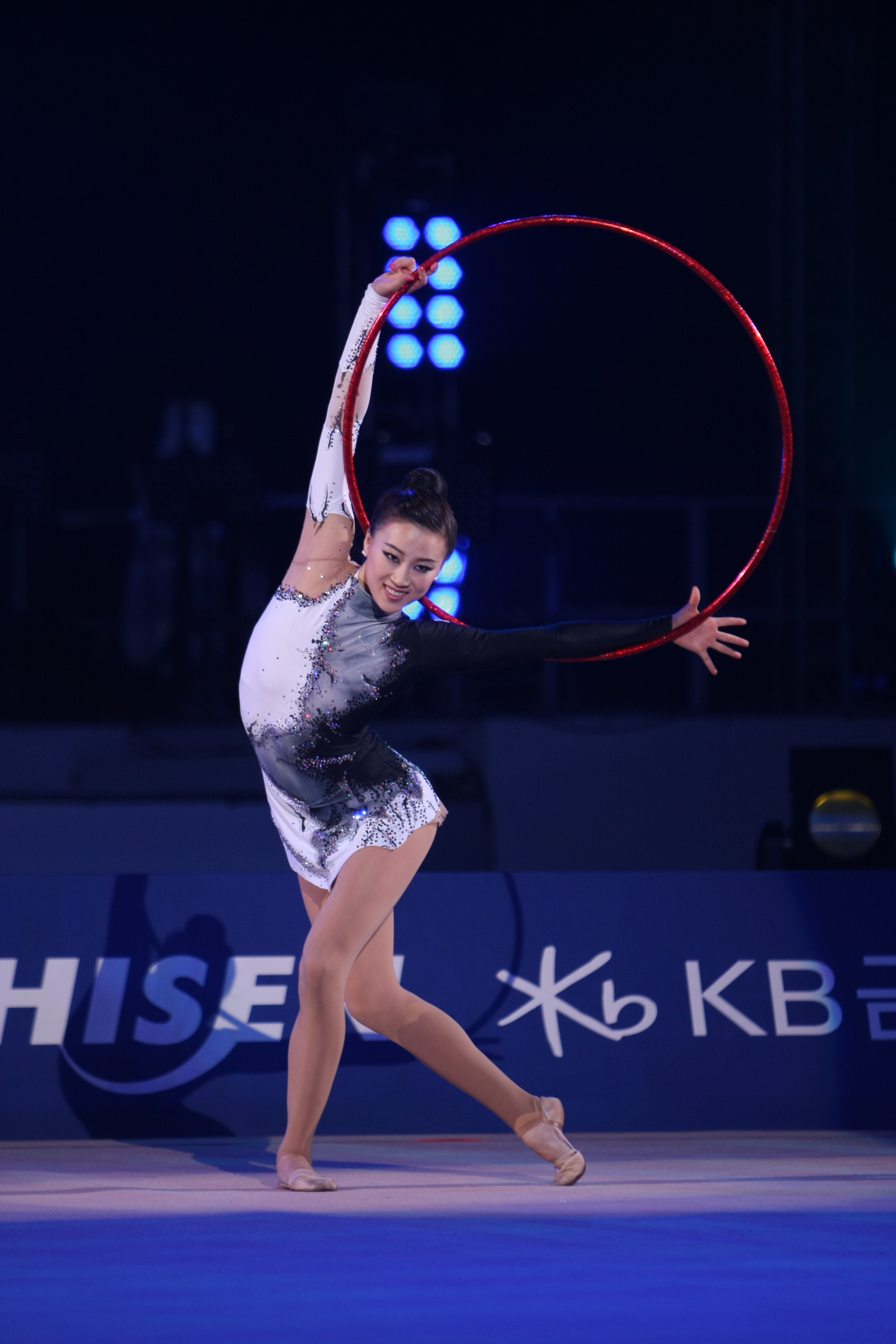

Personal information
- Born: 10 July 1991 (age 35) Gimpo, South Korea
- Height: 167 cm (5 ft 6 in)

Gymnastics career
- Discipline: Rhythmic gymnastics
- Country represented: South Korea (2009-2014)
- Head coach: Jihee Kim
- Retired: yes
Medal record
Representing South Korea
Asian Games
| Silver medal – second place | 2014 Incheon | Team |

Gim Yun-hee (Korean: 김윤희; born 10 July 1991) is a South Korean retired rhythmic gymnast. She represented her country in international competitions.

== Career ==
Yun-hee began the sport in first grade at primary school. In 2009 she was a member of the South Korean national senior group, she went on to compete at the World Championships in Mie where they took 20th place. In 2010, as an individual, she took part in the World Championships in Moscow where she competed only with hoop and ribbon, ending 128th in the All-Around, 33rd with hoop, 42nd with ribbon and 12th in teams. In November she finished 4th in teams, along Lee Kyung-hwa, Shin Soo-ji and Son Yeon-jae, at the 2010 Asian Games.

In 2011 she was selected for the World Championships in Montpellier, taking 44th place in the All-Around, 48th with hoop, 44th with ball, 56th with clubs, 30th with ribbon and 8th in teams. In 2012 she competed at the qualification event for the 2012 Olympic Games, she finished in 20th place and so did not qualify.

In March 2014 she participated in the World Cup in Stuttgart being 22nd in the All-Around, 23rd with hoop, 21st with ball, 23rd with clubs and 19th with ribbon. In Pesaro she took 32nd place overall, 28th with hoop, 42nd with ball, 22nd with clubs and 32nd with ribbon. In Sofia she finished 21st in the All-Around, 21st with hoop, 23rd with ball, 33rd with clubs and 23rd with ribbon. In September she was selected for the World Championships in Izmir, she was 45th overall, 82nd with hoop, 44th with ball, 39th with clubs, 51st with ribbon and 10th in teams. Shortly later she wo team silver with Lee Da-ae, Lee Na-kyung and Son Yeon-jae at the 2014 Asian Games. In November she announced her retirement from the sport. She then started working as a coach and commentator.

== Personal life ==
In 2016, Gim married retired Olympic gold medalist fencer Oh Eun-seok.
