= Aliya Yussupova =

Kazakhstani rhythmic gymnast

- Әлия Жүсіпова
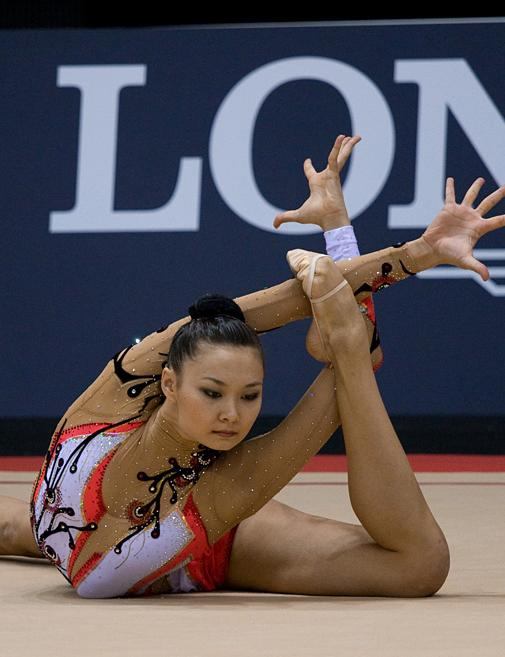
- Yussupova in 2008

Personal information
- Full name: Aliya Makhsutovna Yussupova
- Born: 15 May 1984 (age 42) Chimkent, Kazakh SSR, Soviet Union
- Height: 175 cm (5 ft 9 in)

Gymnastics career
- Discipline: Rhythmic gymnastics
- Country represented: Kazakhstan
- Head coach: Irina Viner
- Former coach: Natalia Rogozhina
- Choreographer: Veronika Shatkova
- Retired: 2009
Medal record
Representing Kazakhstan
Rhythmic Gymnastics
Asian Games
Gold medal – first place	2006 Doha	All-around
Gold medal – first place	2006 Doha	Team
Silver medal – second place	2002 Busan	All-around
Silver medal – second place	2002 Busan	Team
World Cup Final
Silver medal – second place	2004 Moscow	Ball
Silver medal – second place	2004 Moscow	Clubs
World Games
Silver medal – second place	2005 Duisburg	Clubs
Summer Universiade
Bronze medal – third place	2005 Izmir	Ball
Bronze medal – third place	2007 Bangkok	Ribbon
Bronze medal – third place	2009 Belgrade	All-around
Bronze medal – third place	2009 Belgrade	Hoop
Asian Championships
Gold medal – first place	2006 Surat	All-around
Gold medal – first place	2006 Surat	Team
Gold medal – first place	2006 Surat	Rope
Gold medal – first place	2006 Surat	Ball
Gold medal – first place	2006 Surat	Clubs
Gold medal – first place	2006 Surat	Ribbon
Gold medal – first place	2009 Astana	All-around
Gold medal – first place	2009 Astana	Team
Gold medal – first place	2009 Astana	Rope
Gold medal – first place	2009 Astana	Hoop
Gold medal – first place	2009 Astana	Ball
Gold medal – first place	2009 Astana	Ribbon

Aliya Makhsutovna Yussupova (Note: From Russian: Алия Махсутовна Юсупова) (Kazakh: Әлия Мақсұтқызы Жүсіпова, romanized: Äliia Maqsūtqyzy Jüsıpova; born 15 May 1984) is a retired individual rhythmic gymnast who competed for Kazakhstan, coached by Irina Viner. In February 2021, she became the president of the Kazakhstan Gymnastics Federation, and she was re-elected in 2024.

== Personal life ==
Aliya Yussupova is a Sunni Muslim of Kazakh ethnicity. She has two kids - a son and a daughter.

== Career ==
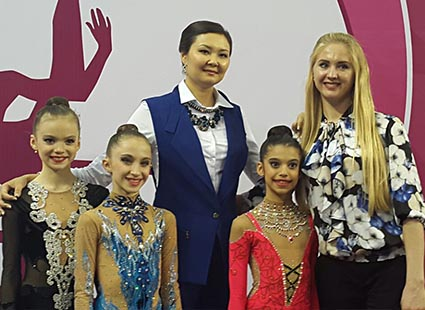
Yussupova in 2015

Yussupova moved to Moscow and began training with renowned Russian coach Irina Viner.

She won two silver medals in ball and clubs at the 2004 World Cup Final in Moscow. At the 2004 Athens Olympics, she qualified for the finals in 5th place. In the finals, she took fourth place with a total of 103.975 (Ribbon 25.550, Clubs 26.325, Ball 26.600, Hoop 25.500).

Yussupova won the Kazakhstani National Championships in the individual all-around competition in 2000–2005. She competed at the 2005 World Championships in Baku, Azerbaijan and took 7th place in all-around final. She was also 7th in clubs and 6th in ribbon finals. At the 2006 Asian championships in Surat, India, held from 29 July to 3 August, she swept the rhythmic gymnastics medals. She won six gold medals, including four individual apparatus titles, the team gold and the individual all-around title. At the 2007 World Championships in Patras, Greece, she finished 6th in the all-around. She was 4th in ribbon, 6th in hoop and 7th in clubs final.

She competed in her second Olympics at the 2008 Summer Olympics in Beijing, where she finished 5th in the all-around event finals. She was the all-around bronze medalist at the 2009 Universiade. At the 2009 Asian championships in Astana, she won all six gold medals again. In September, she competed at the 2009 World Championships in Mie, Japan. She took 11th place in all-around final, 8th place in ribbon final and 6th in team competition with Anna Alyabyeva and Marina Petrakova.

Yussupova retired from competition at the end of the 2009 season.

== Coaching career ==
In 2013, she started to train fellow Kazakhstani rhythmic gymnast Sabina Ashirbayeva. Her other notable students include Alina Adilkhanova and Elzhana Taniyeva. She was the head coach of the Kazakhstani national team from 2012 until 2025, when she resigned to focus more on her work with the federation.

== Achievements ==
- First Asian and Kazakh rhythmic gymnast to medal at the World Cup final.
- First Kazakh gymnast to place in top 10 Finals in the Olympic Games (2004 and 2008).

== Detailed Olympic results ==
Year	Competition description	Location	Music	Apparatus	Score - final	Score - qualifying
2008	Olympics	Beijing		All-around	69.800	69.800
2008	Olympics	Beijing	Music from Da Vinci Code by Hans Zimmer	Hoop	17.625	17.900
2008	Olympics	Beijing	Scott & Fran's Paso Doble by David Hirschfelder & The Bogo Pogo Orchestra	Rope	17.825	17.575
2008	Olympics	Beijing	Spartacus by Aram Khatchaturian	Clubs	17.650	17.575
2008	Olympics	Beijing	Artsakh by Ara Gevorkian	Ribbon	16.700	16.750

Year	Competition description	Location	Music	Apparatus	Score - final	Score - qualifying
2004	Olympics	Athens		All-around	103.975	101.500
2004	Olympics	Athens	Mystics Lullaby / Anatolian Deluxe / Marrakesh Night Market by Loreena McKennitt / Turkish Percussion Group	Ball	26.600	26.150
2004	Olympics	Athens	Bolero (Closing Credits) music from Moulin Rouge by Steve Sharples	Hoop	25.500	25.800
2004	Olympics	Athens	Ya Habibi Yallah by Alabina	Clubs	26.325	25.725
2004	Olympics	Athens	Op-sa by Esil Dyuran	Ribbon	25.550	23.825
