= Son Yeon-jae =

South Korean rhythmic gymnast (born 1994)

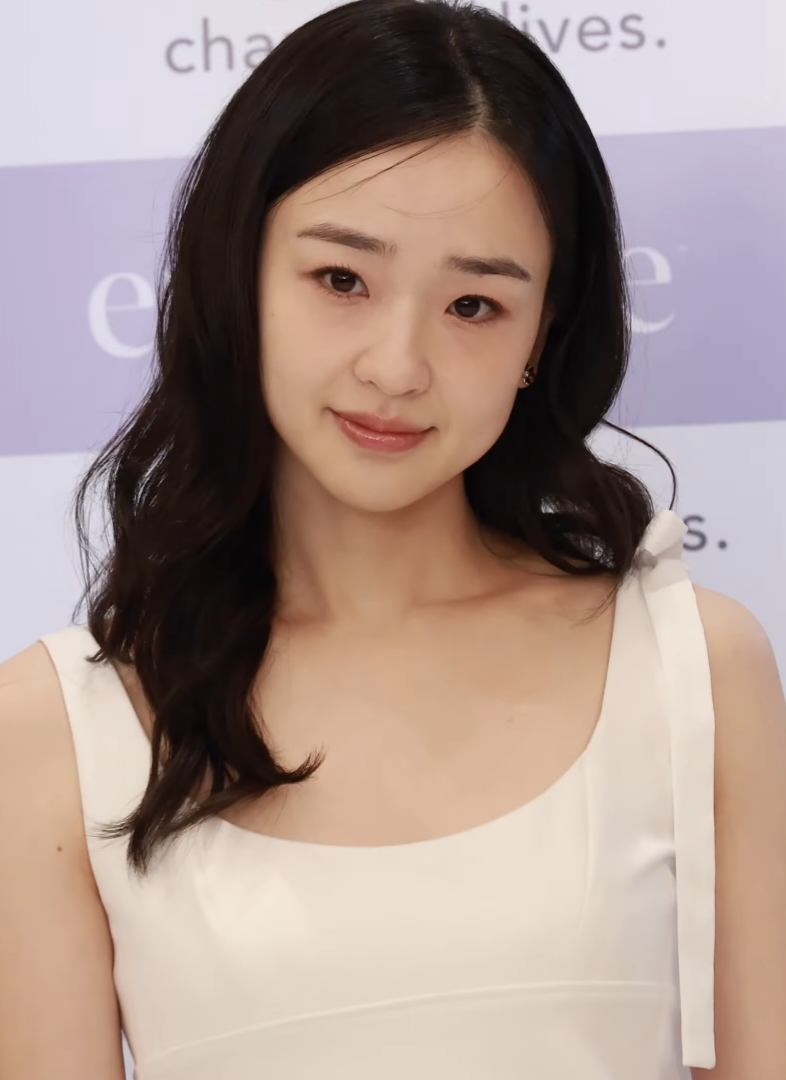
- Son in June 2025

Personal information
- Full name: 손연재
- Nickname: Fairy
- Born: 28 May 1994 (age 32) Gunja-dong, Gwangjin-gu, Seoul, South Korea
- Height: 165 cm (5 ft 5 in)
- Spouse: Lee Jun-hyo (m. 2022)

Gymnastics career
- Country represented: South Korea; (South Korea)
- Gym: Novogorsk
- Head coach: Elena Nefedova
- Retired: 2017
- World ranking: 5 (2016 Season); 5 (2015 Season); 5 (2014 Season); 5 (2013 Season); 9 (2012 Season); 19 (2011 Season)
Medal record
Representing South Korea
Rhythmic Gymnastics
World Championships
Bronze medal – third place	2014 Izmir	Hoop
Asian Games
Gold medal – first place	2014 Incheon	All-around
Silver medal – second place	2014 Incheon	Team
Bronze medal – third place	2010 Guangzhou	All-around
Summer Universiade
Gold medal – first place	2015 Gwangju	All-Around
Gold medal – first place	2015 Gwangju	Hoop
Gold medal – first place	2015 Gwangju	Ball
Silver medal – second place	2013 Kazan	Ball
Silver medal – second place	2015 Gwangju	Clubs
Silver medal – second place	2015 Gwangju	Ribbon
Asian Championships
Gold medal – first place	2013 Tashkent	All-around
Gold medal – first place	2013 Tashkent	Hoop
Gold medal – first place	2013 Tashkent	Clubs
Gold medal – first place	2015 Jecheon	All-around
Gold medal – first place	2015 Jecheon	Hoop
Gold medal – first place	2015 Jecheon	Ball
Gold medal – first place	2016 Tashkent	All-around
Gold medal – first place	2016 Tashkent	Hoop
Gold medal – first place	2016 Tashkent	Ribbon
Gold medal – first place	2016 Tashkent	Ball
Gold medal – first place	2016 Tashkent	Clubs
Silver medal – second place	2013 Tashkent	Ribbon
Silver medal – second place	2013 Tashkent	Team
Silver medal – second place	2015 Jecheon	Team
Bronze medal – third place	2015 Jecheon	Ribbon

- Son Yeon-jae
- Hangul: 손연재
- Hanja: 孫延在
- RR: Son Yeonjae
- MR: Son Yŏnjae

Son Yeon-jae KTM (Korean: 손연재; born 28 May 1994) is a South Korean retired individual rhythmic gymnast. She is a former member of the South Korean national gymnastics team, based in Taereung, Seoul. Son is the 2014 Asian Games All-around Champion, the 2010 Asian Games All-around bronze medalist, three-time (2016, 2015, 2013) Asian Championships All-around Champion. She is the first and only South Korean individual rhythmic gymnast to win a medal at the World Championships, FIG World Cup series, Universiade and the Asian Games.

Son is managed by the IB Sports agency. She trained in Russia. Son is also a recipient of the Talent Medal of Korea in 2011.

== Athletic career ==
Son was born in Seoul, South Korea on 28 May 1994. She is of the Miryang Son clan. In 2008, she won the all-around gold medal at the Angel Cup in Malaysia. In 2009, she performed for the opening ceremony of Olympic and World champion figure skater, Kim Yuna's Festa on Ice. In 13–15 November, she became the junior all-around champion at the Slovenian Challenge Tournament, it was the first time a South Korean rhythmic gymnast won a gold medal at any International Tournaments level of FIG. Son became a star in Korea, similarly as Olympic champion Kim Yuna, after grabbing a medal in individual all-around at the 2010 Asian Games in Guangzhou, becoming the first South Korean rhythmic gymnast to do so. Soon after that, she went to Russia for long-term training.

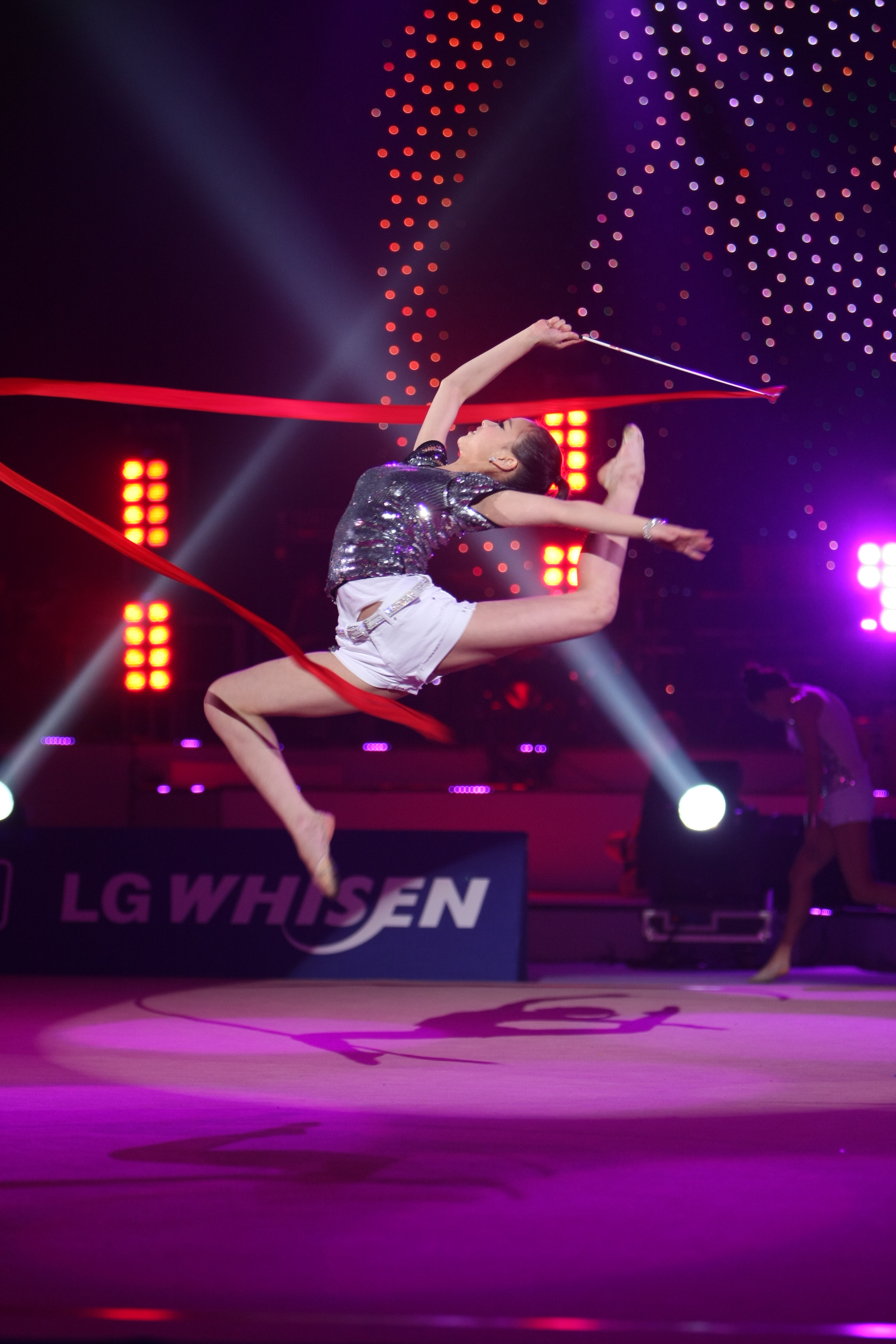
Son at the 2011 L.G. Whisen All-Star gala

Son Yeon-jae made her senior international debut at the 2010 Kalamata World Cup where she finished 12th in all-around. Then she competed at Corbeil-Essonnes International Rhythmic Gymnastics Tournament in May 2010 and placed 11th in all-around. At the 2010 World Championships, she placed 32nd in the individual all-around and did not advance into the finals. At the 2011 Grand Prix, she placed 19th in the individual overall with the total score of 100.700 points.

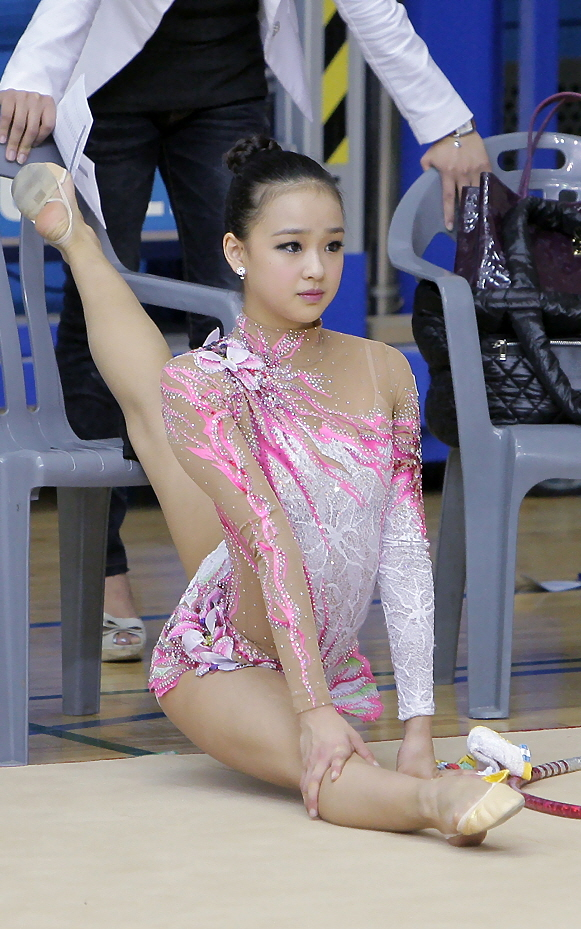
Son stretching in warmup, October 2011

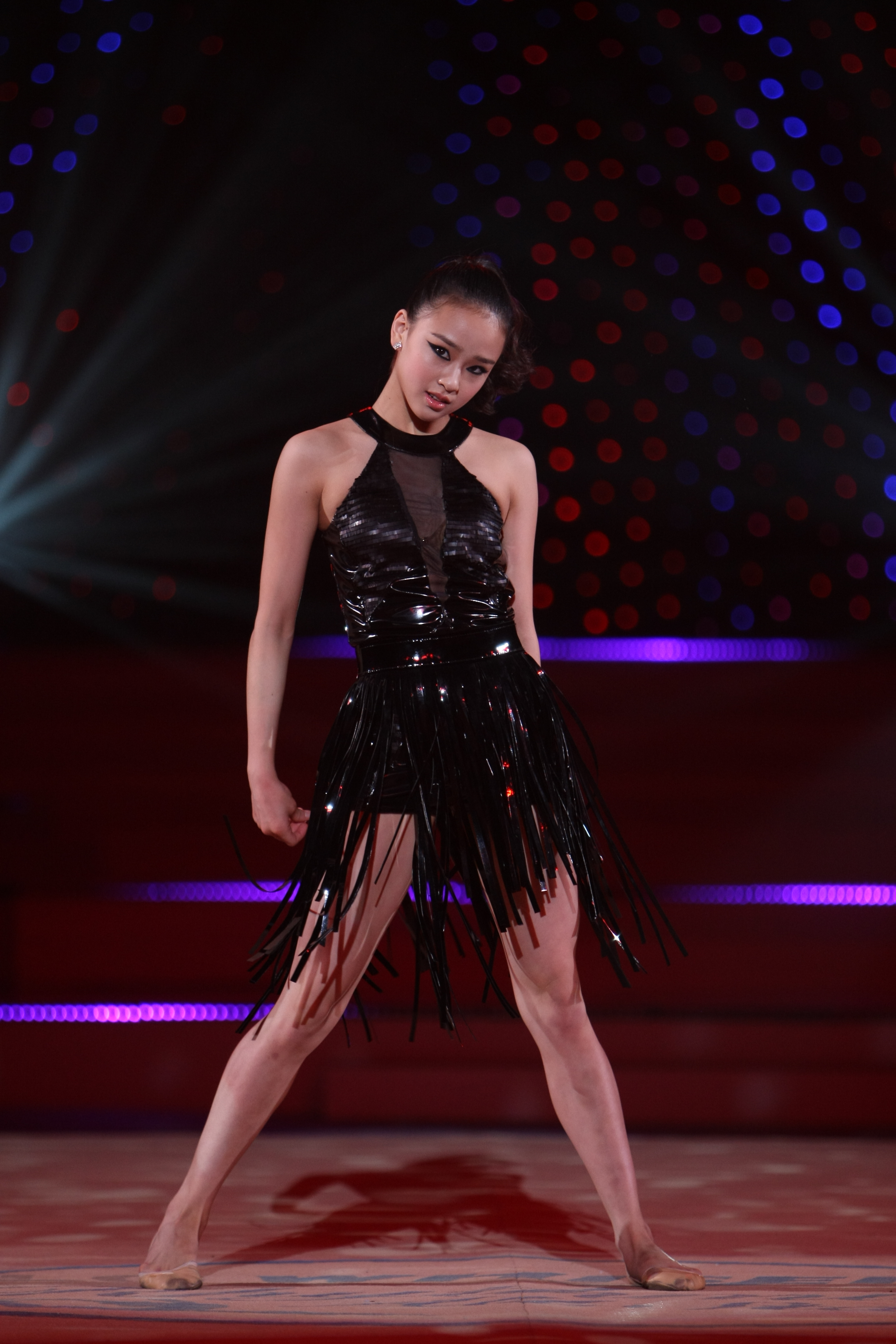
Son at the 2011 L.G. Whisen All-Star gala

At the Grand Prix series held in February 2012, she tied for the 18th place with Wong Poh San with the total score of 100.850 in the individual overall and third in the Hoop final. In April 2012, Son became the first Korean rhythmic gymnast to medal at the World Cup Series, Category B by winning a bronze medal in the Hoop final in Penza, Russia, and placed fourth in the individual overall. In May 2012, she finished last in the Hoop final at the World Cup Series, Category B in Tashkent, Uzbekistan, and placed fifth overall. Son finished second to last in the individual all-around at the World Cup Series, Category A in Sofia, Bulgaria.

=== 2012 Olympics ===
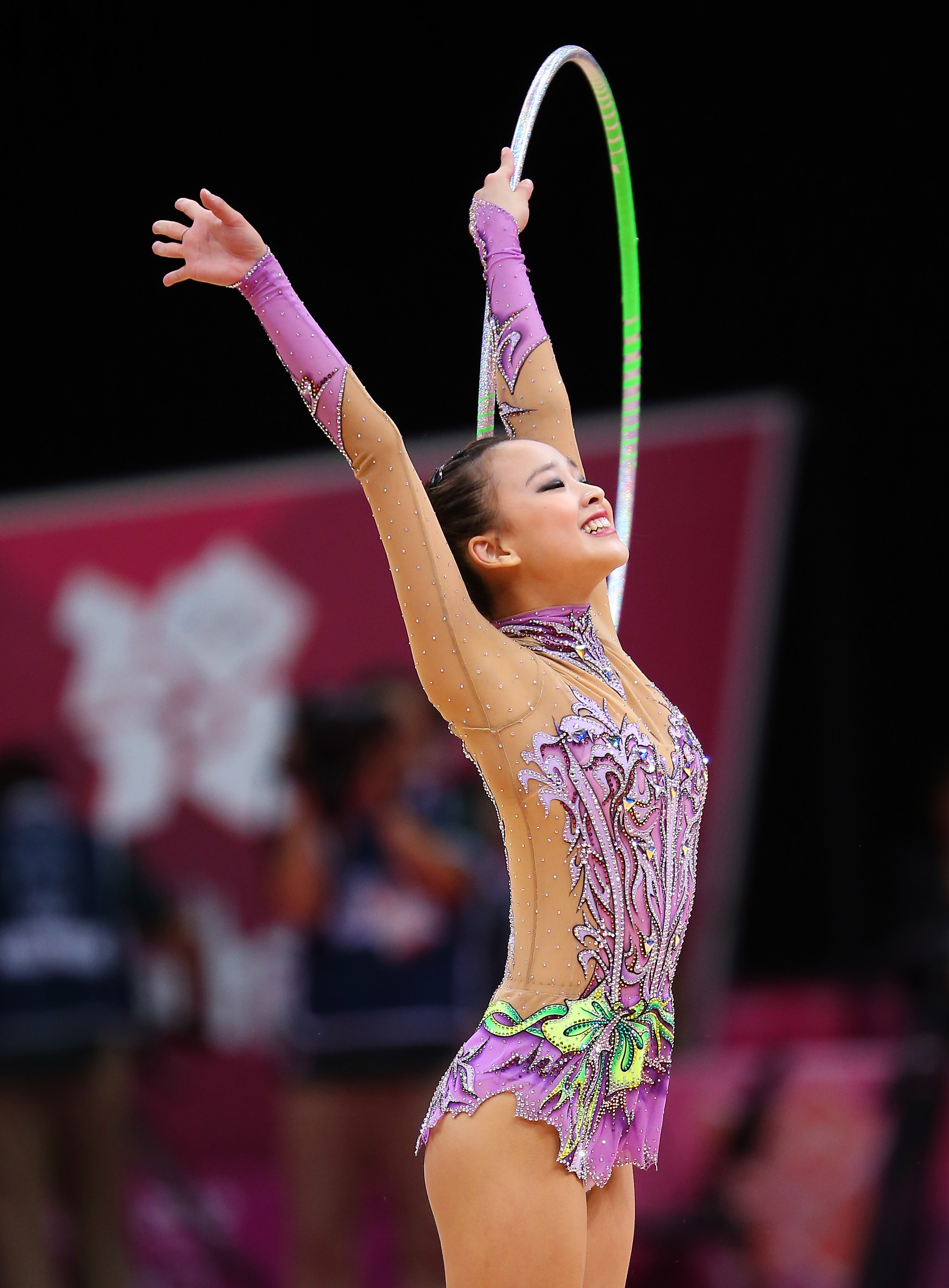
Son at the 2012 Summer Olympics

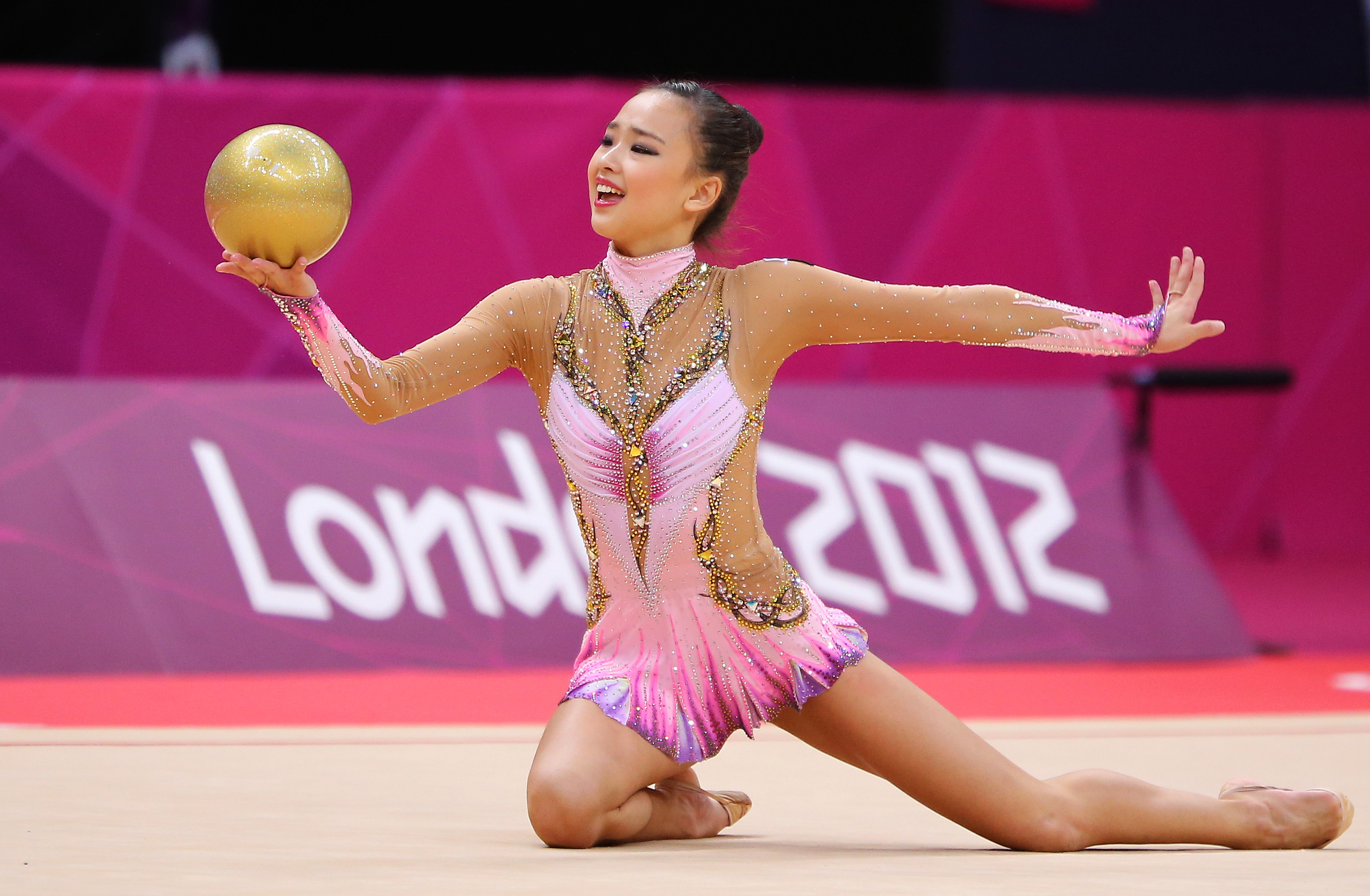
Son at the 2012 Summer Olympics, performing with ball

Son placed 6th at the Qualifications. At the All-around finals, She was ranked 3rd in the rankings up to the 2nd rotation until a drop from her Clubs scored her a 26.750 points. Son placed 5th overall at the Finals with a score of 111.475 points. Son became the first Korean Rhythmic Gymnast to qualify and reach the All-around Finals at the Olympics.

=== 2013–2016 ===
In 2013, Son started her season competing at the 2013 Moscow Grand Prix where she won bronze in clubs, she competed at the 2013 Lisboa World Cup where she finished 9th in all-around and won bronze in ribbon. On 30 April 2013, Son got a silver medal in the ribbon finals at the 2013 Pesaro World Cup, it was the first time a Korean athlete won a silver medal at any discipline of a rhythmic gymnastic World Cup. Son finished 4th in all-around at the 2013 Sofia World Cup and shared the bronze medal in hoop with Ukrainian Ganna Rizatdinova. Son then competed at the 2013 Minsk World Cup where she finished 4th in all-around, at the event finals, she took the silver medals in hoop and in clubs who was tied with Russian rising star Yana Kudryavtseva, she finished 4th in ribbon and 7th in ball. Son competed at the 2013 Asian Championships in Tashkent, Uzbekistan where she became the first Korean rhythmic gymnast to win gold in the all-around, she also helped Team Korea win the silver medal. At the finals, Son won gold in hoop and clubs, she won silver in ribbon behind China's Deng Senyue and finished 4th in ball. She competed at the 2013 Summer Universiade where she finished 6th in all-around, she qualified to 3 event finals where she won silver in ball, placed 5th in clubs and 7th in ribbon. At the 2013 World Cup series in St.Petersburg, Russia, Son finished 4th in all-around and in the event finals won silver in hoop, bronze in ribbon, placed 4th in clubs and ball. At the 2013 World Championships in Kyiv, Ukraine, Son qualified to 3 event finals where she finished 7th in hoop, ball and 6th in clubs behind Deng Senyue. She finished 5th in the All-around at the 2013 World Championships again behind Chinese rival Deng Senyue who finished 4th.

In 2014, Son began her season competing at the 2014 Moscow Grand Prix finishing 6th in the all-around, at the event finals she won bronze medals in ribbon, clubs and hoop. Son then competed at the 2014 Stuttgart World Cup finishing 7th in All-around, she qualified to 3 event finals: she took silver in ribbon, placed 8th in ball and 5th in hoop. Son won her first gold medal in the World Cup at the 2014 Lisbon World Cup becoming the first Asian and Korean rhythmic gymnast to win and medal in the All-around. She scored a total of 71.200 points ahead of Melitina Staniouta (silver) and World Cup debutante Dina Averina (bronze). In the event finals, Son became the first Asian and Korean rhythmic gymnast to win 3 gold medals (in ball, clubs, ribbon) and won bronze in hoop behind Staniouta and Maria Titova. She followed with her next event at the 2014 Pesaro World Cup, where Son finished 5th in all-around and won silver in clubs and bronze in ball final. On 30 May – 1 June, Son competed at the 2014 Minsk World Cup and finished 10th in all-around, she qualified to 3 event finals and won a silver in hoop, bronze in ribbon. On 8–10 August, Son competed at the 2014 Sofia World Cup and won the all-around bronze medal with a total of 70.250 points. She qualified to 4 event finals: taking 2 bronze medals (in hoop, ball), 4th in clubs and 5th in ribbon. On 5–7 September, competing at the 2014 World Cup series in Kazan, Russia, Son finished 5th in the all-around behind Katsiaryna Halkina with a total of 69.750 points. She qualified to 3 event finals taking bronze in hoop, placed 5th in ball and 6th in clubs. On 22–27 September, Son represented Korea at the 2014 World Championships, she qualified to 4 event finals, where she won bronze medal in hoop (where she became the first Korean rhythmic gymnast to win a medal at the World Championships, placed 4th in clubs, 5th in ribbon and ball. In the All-around finals, Son finished 4th with a total score of 70.933 points and came on top among the Asian participants, beating her Chinese rival Deng Senyue, who finished 5th by a margin of 1.167 points. Son then flew to her home country in Incheon, Korea for the 2014 Asian Games where she won the gold medal becoming the first Korean to win rhythmic gymnastics in the Asian Games. Son was named the best athlete of the year 42 percent of the votes ahead of Kim Yuna with 33.3 percent votes and was awarded the MBN Women Sports Award 2014 in Seoul.

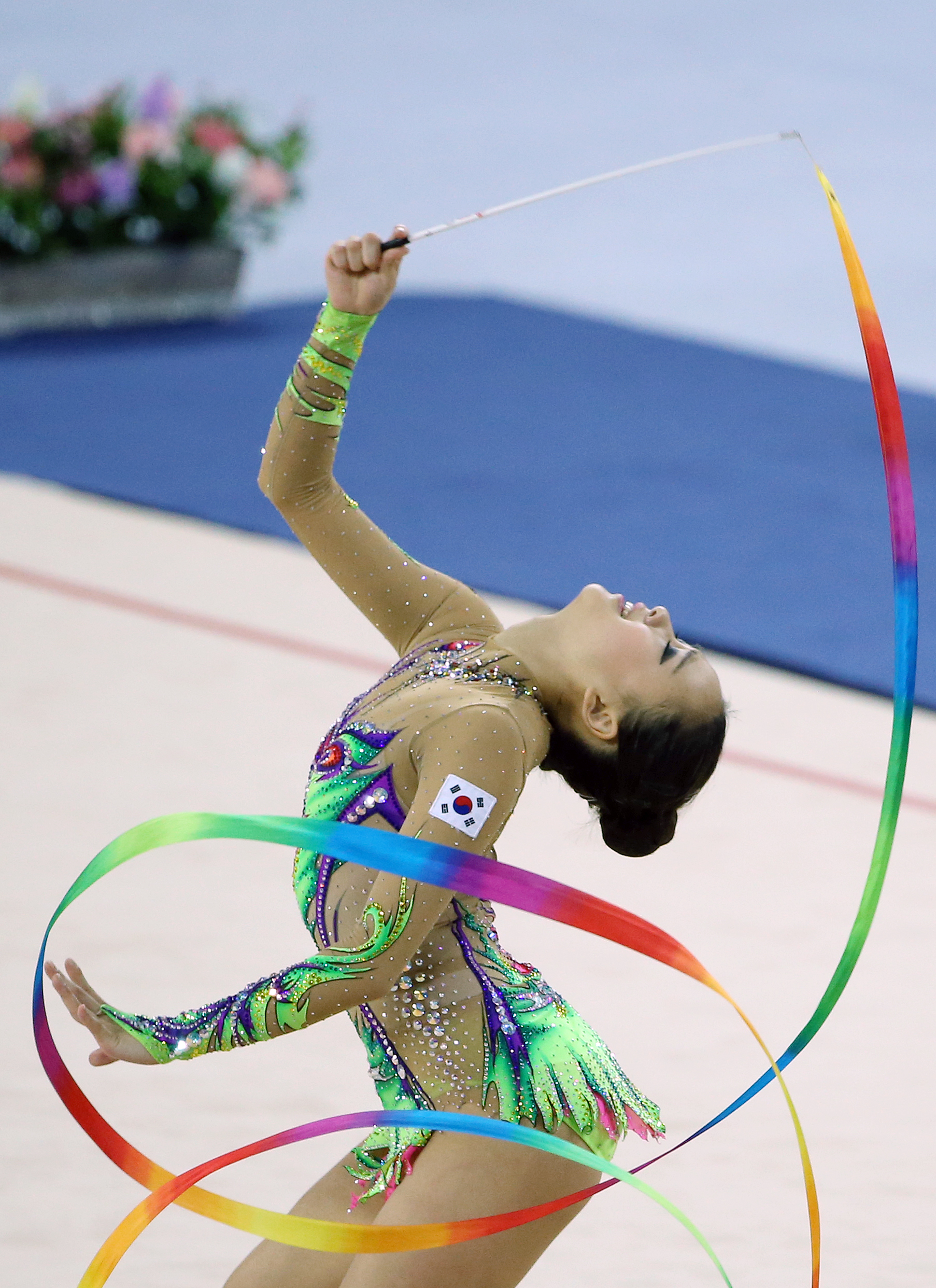
Son performing with ribbon at the 2014 Asian Games in Incheon

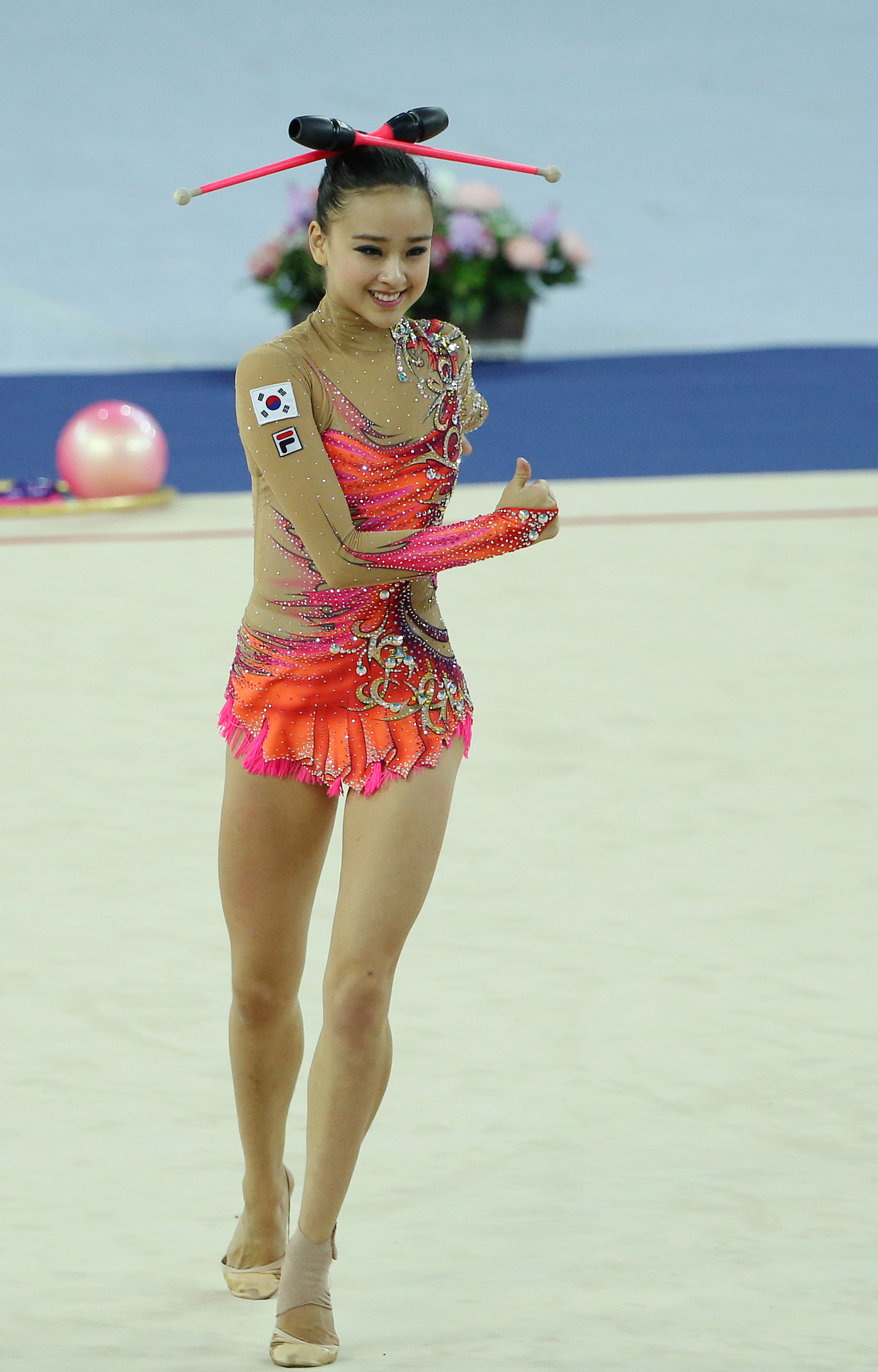
Son performing with clubs at the 2014 Asian Games in Incheon

In 2015, Son withdrew from her first scheduled event at the 2015 Moscow Grand Prix citing illness. On 27–29 March, Son returned to competition at the 2015 Lisboa World Cup finishing 4th in the all-around, in event finals: she won silver in hoop, placed 5th (clubs, ball) and 6th (ribbon). She then competed at the 2015 Bucharest World Cup finishing 4th in all-around, she withdrew from the apparatus finals after suffering an ankle injury. On 22–24 May, Son returned to competition at the 2015 Tashkent World Cup where she won the all-around bronze behind Russians Margarita Mamun (gold) and Aleksandra Soldatova (silver). She qualified to all 4 apparatus finals, taking bronze in hoop, placed 7th in ball, 8th in clubs and 6th in ribbon. On 10–13 June, Son won the all-around gold at the 2015 Asian Championships held in Jecheon, South Korea, she qualified to all event finals taking gold in hoop, ball, a bronze in ribbon and finished 5th in clubs. Her next competition was at the 2015 Summer Universiade in Gwangju, Korea were Son won the all-around gold ahead of Ganna Rizatdinova (silver) and Melitina Staniouta (bronze). Son qualified to all apparatus finals taking gold in hoop, ball and silver in clubs, ribbon. In August, Son competed at the 2015 Sofia World Cup finishing 5th in the all-around behind Melitina Staniouta of Belarus. Son qualified to all apparatus finals finishing 4th in (ball, clubs, ribbon) and 5th in hoop. At the 2015 World Cup series, Son finished 5th in the all-around behind Staniouta. Son qualified to 4 apparatus finals, taking bronze in hoop and finishing 4th in ball, 5th in ribbon, 6th in clubs. On 9–13 September, Son competed at the 2015 World Championships in Stuttgart, she qualified to all 4 apparatus finals finishing 5th in Hoop, 4th in Ball, 8th in Clubs and 5th in Ribbon. In the All-around final, Son made mistakes in the ribbon performance, she had trouble controlling the ribbon, had tangles, a drop and lost a dance step, which resulted in her poor 16.116 points and in her last performance in ball, she made another mistake by dropping the ball while rolling it on her back scoring 17.483. Son finished 11th overall with a total of 69.998 points, behind Bulgarian Neviana Vladinova.

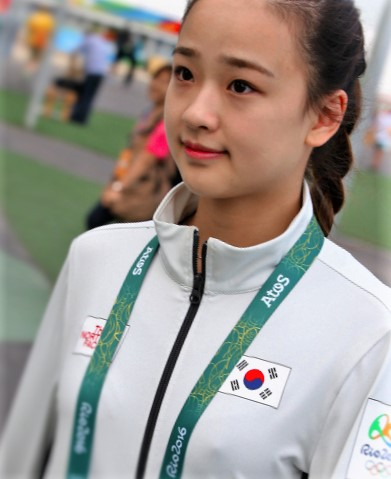
Son at the 2016 Summer Olympics in Rio de Janeiro, Brazil

In 2016, Son started her season participating at the 2016 Moscow Grand Prix finishing 2nd in the all-around behind Aleksandra Soldatova. During the event finals; she won silver in hoop, bronze with ball and ribbon and she placed 4th with clubs. On 26-28 February, Son competed at the 2016 Espoo World Cup and won the all-around silver ahead of Ganna Rizatdinova; in apparatus finals she won gold in ball, silver in ribbon, bronze in hoop, and 7th in clubs. On 17–20 March, Son then competed at the 2016 Lisboa World Cup where she finished 4th in the all-around behind Neta Rivkin, in apparatus finals: she won bronze in hoop, ball, placed 4th in clubs and 7th in ribbon. On 1–3 April, Son finished 4th in the all-around with a total of 73.900 points at the 2016 Pesaro World Cup behind Ukrainian Ganna Rizatdinova. In event finals: she won silver in clubs, bronze in ribbon, placed 4th in ball and 6th in hoop. On 8–10 May, Son won the all-around gold at the 2016 Asian Championships with a total of 73.750 points, she also completed a golden sweep in the apparatus finals (hoop, ball, clubs, ribbon) becoming only the second Asian rhythmic gymnast to make a golden sweep at the Asian Championships since Aliya Yussupova won all the gold back in 2009. On 27–29 May, Son finished won bronze in the all-around at the 2016 Sofia World Cup with a total of 74.200 points, she qualified to all apparatus finals winning gold in clubs, silver in hoop, ribbon and bronze in ball. On 3–5 June, Son then finished 4th in the all-around behind Ganna Rizatdinova, Son scored a new PB of 74.650 points at the 2016 Guadalajara World Cup, she finished 4th in (hoop, ribbon, clubs) and won bronze in ball finals. On 8–10 July, Son then finished 4th in the all-around at the 2016 Kazan World Cup with a total of 74.900 points - updating her Personal Best, she qualified to all apparatus finals taking silver in hoop, bronze in ribbon, 4th in ball and clubs.

=== 2016 Olympics ===
On 19–20 August, Son competed at the 2016 Summer Olympics held in Rio de Janeiro, Brazil. She qualified in the rhythmic gymnastics individual all-around final, finishing 4th overall with a total of 72.898 points.

=== Retirement ===
After the 2016 Summer Olympics; Son decided to continue her studies, she is enrolled at Yonsei University. Nevertheless, before the end of the year; Son was voted as the top South Korean athlete of 2016, a national survey conducted by Gallup Korea, Son had received 29.8 percent of the votes. Son Yeon-jae announced her retirement on Saturday, 18 February 2017 at the age of 22.

== Personal life ==
Son is an only child. She is also the second cousin of Korean figure skater Yun Yea-ji.

=== Relationship and Marriage ===
As of 14 June 2017, Son was revealed to be in a relationship with the leader and lead guitarist of rock band F.T. Island's Choi Jong-hoon. At a fan meeting in Japan on 1 August 2017, Choi revealed that they have broken up and his agency, FNC Entertainment, later confirmed this information.

On 7 April 2022, it was confirmed that Son was in a relationship with a businessman, who is 9 years her senior. Later in May 2022, Son announced that she would marry in August 2022. Their private wedding ceremony was held on 21 August 2022 at Hotel Shilla in Seoul. Son donated 50 million won for her wedding gift to Severance Children's Hospital.

Son announced her pregnancy on 20 August 2023. On 20 February 2024, her agency confirmed that Son recently gave birth to her first child, a son.

== Advertisements ==
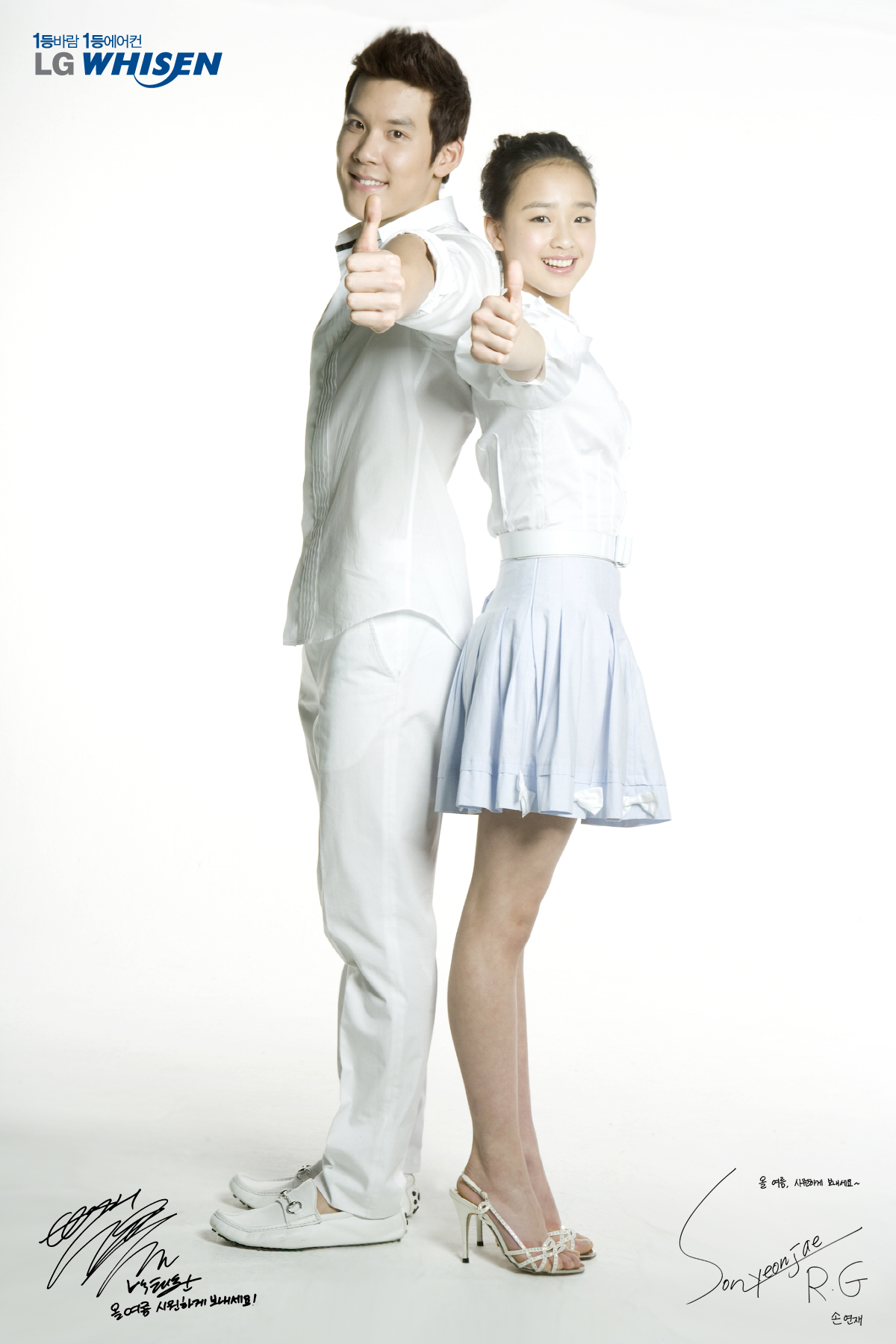
Son with Park Tae-hwan in LG campaign

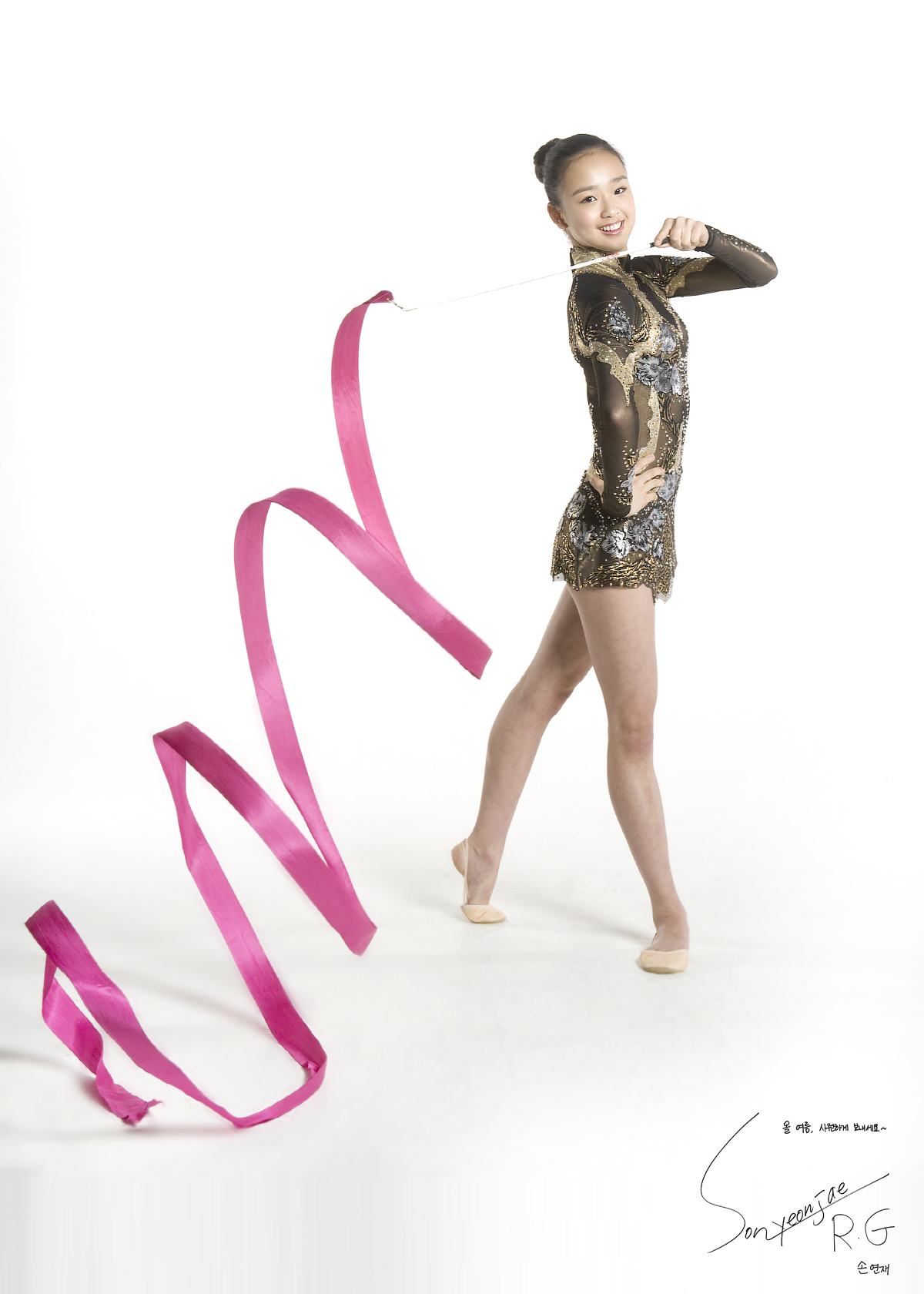
Son in LG campaign

Son has some advertisements such as LG, Pantene, Mr.Pizza and Fila.

== Achievements ==
- First and only South Korean rhythmic gymnast to place in the Top 10 finals at the Olympic Games (5th in 2012 Summer Olympics and 4th in 2016 Summer Olympics).
- First and only South Korean rhythmic gymnast to win a medal at the World Championships (at the 2014 World Rhythmic Gymnastics Championships).
- First Asian and South Korean rhythmic gymnast to win gold in the All-around at the FIG World Cup series.
- First and only South Korean rhythmic gymnast to win a medal at the FIG World Cup series.
- First and only South Korean rhythmic gymnast to win a medal at the Universiade individual.
- First and only South Korean rhythmic gymnast to win gold at the Asian Championships.
- First and only South Korean rhythmic gymnast to win a medal at the Asian Games individual (at the 2010 Asian Games).

== Variety shows ==
Son appeared on two episodes 109 and 110 of SBS's variety show "Running Man" hosted by the "Nation's MC" Yoo Jae-suk together with swimmer Park Tae-hwan. She has also since appeared in episode 130 of KBS 2TV's variety show "Win Win", sharing about her hardships and struggles while training for competitions. Son also participated in episode 296 and episode 350 of MBC's variety show "Infinity Challenge", also hosted by MC Yoo Jae-suk. While on Happy Together, Son revealed her good impressions towards popular Chinese swimmer Ning Zetao. In 2016, she appeared as a guest in episode 322 of "Running Man". In 2017, she appeared in Swan Club as the 6th member of the club.

== Routine music information ==
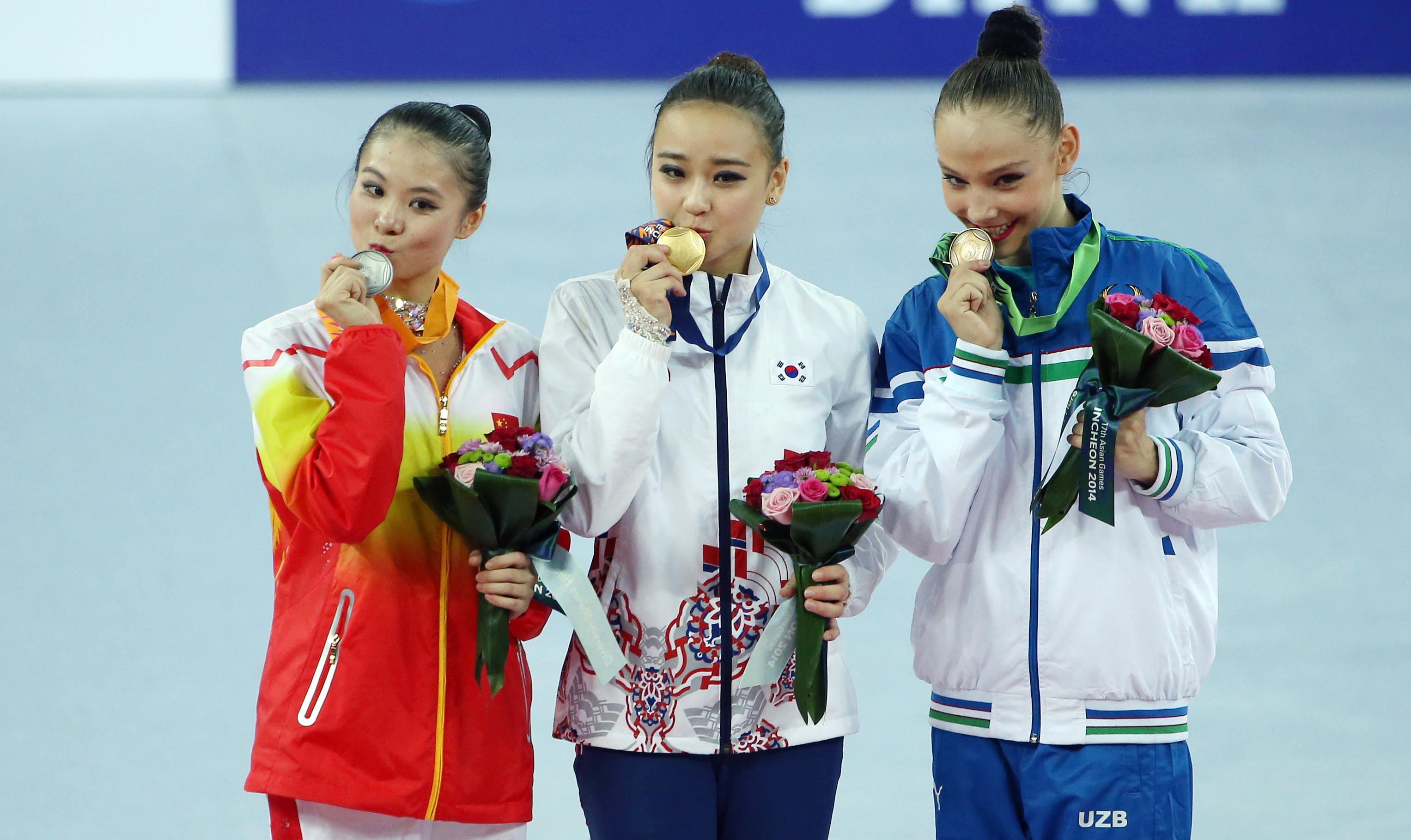
Son's gold medal at the 2014 Asian Games

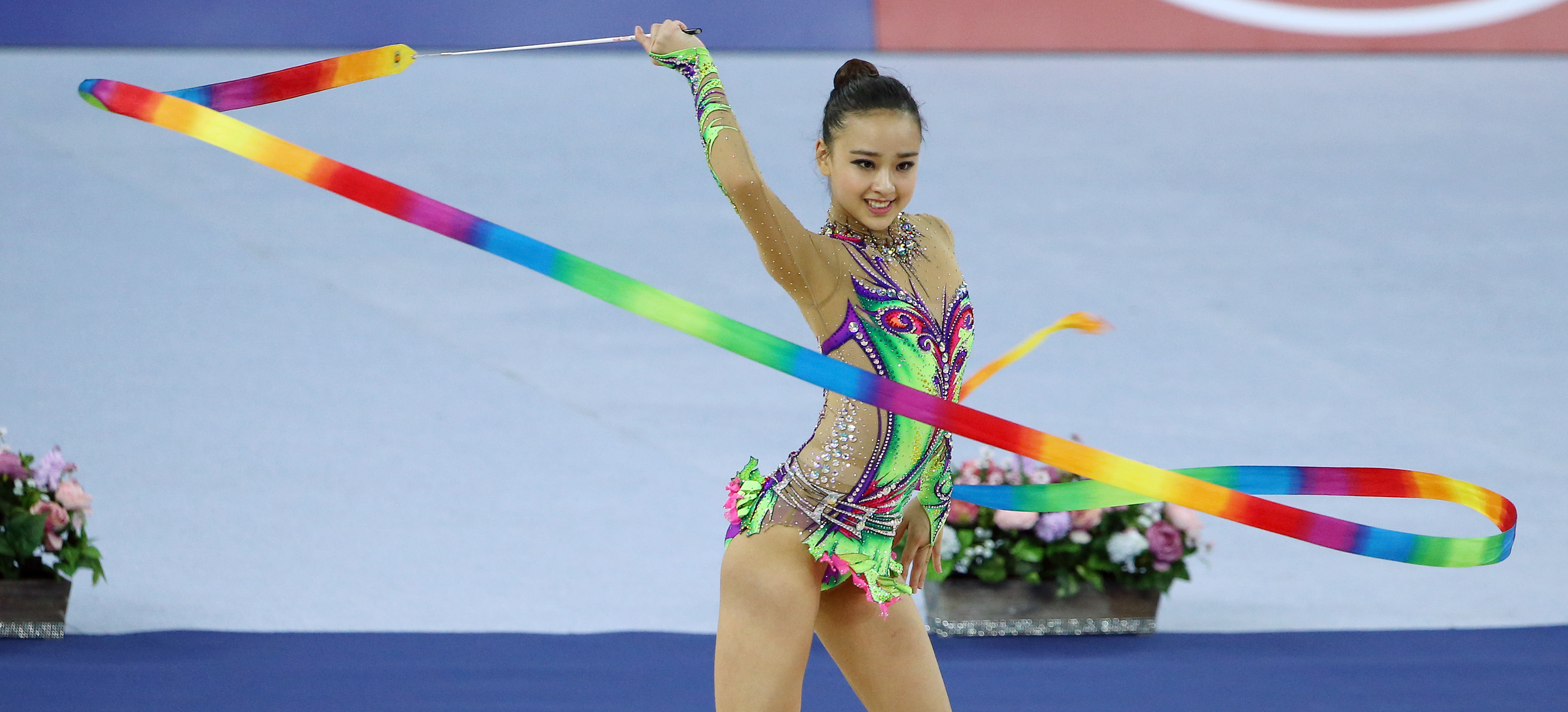
Son at the 2014 Asian Games

Year	Apparatus	Music title
2016	Hoop	Valse by Nicolas Jorelle
2016	Ball	Parla Piu Piano by Filippa Giordano
2016	Clubs	Oye Negra by Terry Snyder
2016	Ribbon	Libertango by Michel Camilo, Tomatito, Cinema Serenade Ensemble
2015	Hoop	Cornish Rhapsody by Hubert Bath
2015	Ball	Somos by Raphael
2015	Clubs	"Cigany" and "I Know What You Want" by !DelaDap; Qué Dolor by Fanfare Ciocarlia
2015	Ribbon	Le Corsaire-Pas De Deux And Variations by London Festival Ballet Orchestra, Terrence Kern
2014	Hoop	Don Quixote by Léon Minkus
2014	Ball	You Don't Give Up on Love by Mark Minkov
2014	Clubs	Luna Mezzo Mare by Patrizio Buanne; Seyra by Petr Dranga
2014	Ribbon	Bahrain by Princess
2013	Hoop	Turandot by Giacomo Puccini
2013	Ball	My Way performed by André Rieu
2013	Clubs	Bella Bella Signorina by Patrizio Buanne
2013	Ribbon	Swan Lake by Pyotr Tchaikovsky
2012	Hoop	Pas De Deux by Pyotr Tchaikovsky
2012	Ball	Limelight Theme by André Rieu
2012	Clubs	Jazz Machine by Black Machine; Only You by Max Greger
2012	Ribbon	Un bel di vedremo from Madame Butterfly by Giacomo Puccini
2011	Hoop	Pas De Deux by Pyotr Tchaikovsky
2011	Ball	Mystic moon by Bowfire
2011	Clubs	Samb adagio by Safri Duo
2011	Ribbon	Young Prince and Princess music from Scheherazade by Nikolai Rimsky-Korsakov
2010	Hoop	?
2010	Ball	Venice rooftops / Ezio's family / The Madam / Flight over Venice 2 music from Assassin's Creed 2 OST by Jesper Kyd
2010	Rope	?
2010	Ribbon	Have You Been Hanging Out With Vicars? / Vampires? Lesbian vampires! music from Lesbian Vampire Killers OST by Royal Philharmonic Orchestra

== Detailed Olympic results ==
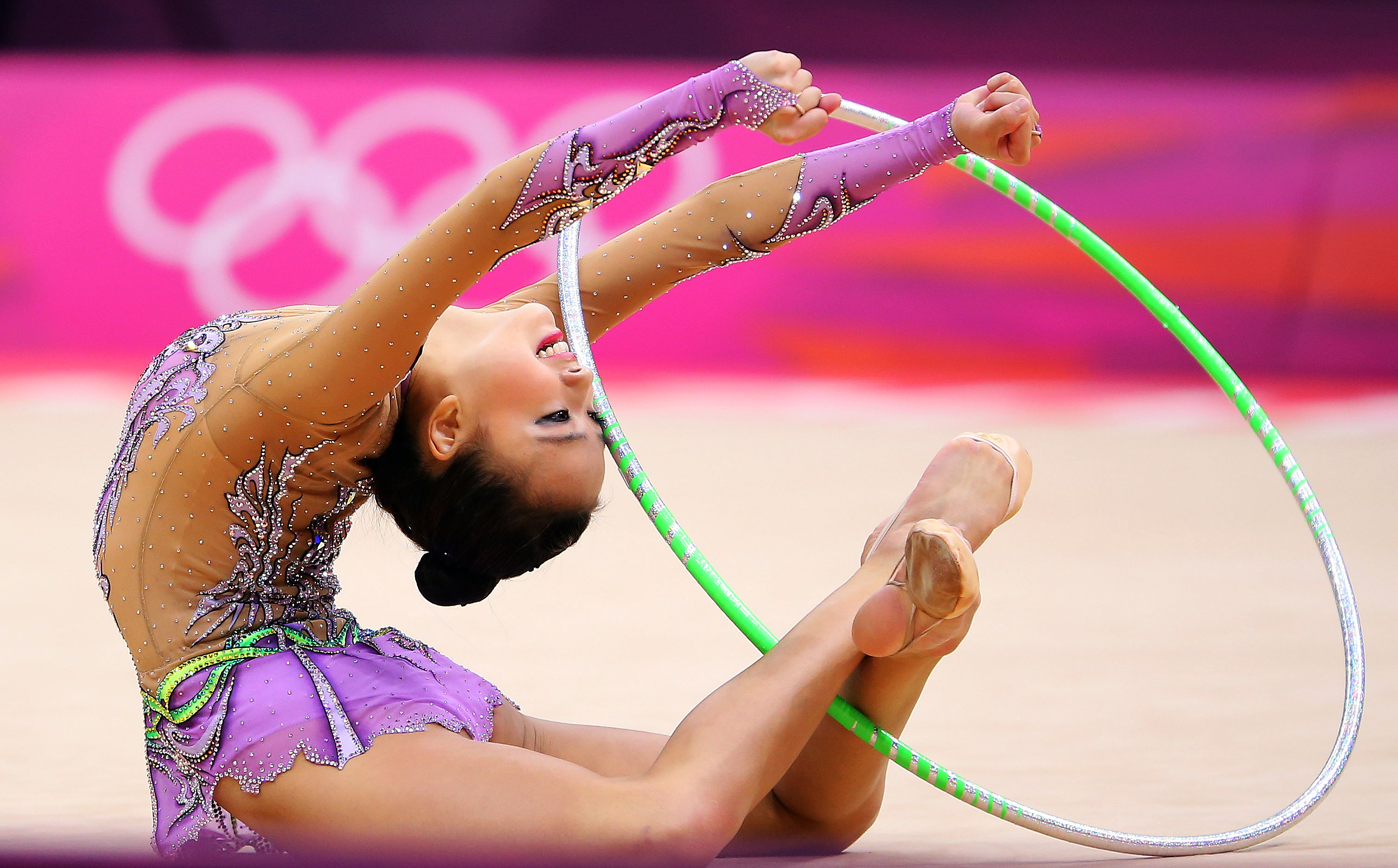
Son at the 2012 Summer Olympics

Year	Competition Description	Location	Music	Apparatus	Score-Final	Score-Qualifying
2016	Olympics	Rio de Janeiro		All-around	72.898	71.956
2016	Olympics	Rio de Janeiro	Valse by Nicolas Jorelle	Hoop	18.216	17.466
2016	Olympics	Rio de Janeiro	Parla Piu Piano by Filippa Giordano	Ball	18.266	18.266
2016	Olympics	Rio de Janeiro	Oye Negra by Terry Snyder	Clubs	18.300	18.358
2016	Olympics	Rio de Janeiro	Libertango by Michel Camilo, Tomatito, Cinema Serenade Ensemble	Ribbon	18.116	17.866

Year	Competition Description	Location	Music	Apparatus	Score-Final	Score-Qualifying
2012	Olympics	London		All-around	111.475	110.300
2012	Olympics	London	Pas De Deux by Pyotr Tchaikovsky	Hoop	28.050	28.075
2012	Olympics	London	Charlie Chaplin Soundtrack by Charlie Chaplin	Ball	28.325	27.825
2012	Olympics	London	Jazz Machine by Black Machine; Only You by Max Greger	Clubs	26.750	26.350
2012	Olympics	London	Un bel di vedremo from Madame Butterfly by Giacomo Puccini	Ribbon	28.350	28.050

== Awards and nominations ==
Name of the award ceremony, year presented, category, nominee of the award, and the result of the nomination
Award ceremony	Year	Category	Nominee / Work	Result	Ref.
Asia Model Awards	2021	Asia Special Award	Son Yeon-jae	Won	
