= Anna Alyabyeva =

Kazakhstani rhythmic gymnast (born 1993)

- Born: November 13, 1993 (age 32) Astana
- Height: 174 cm (5 ft 9 in)

Gymnastics career
- Discipline: Rhythmic gymnastics
- Country represented: Kazakhstan
- Head coach: Irina Viner
- Assistant coach: Natalia Gorbulina
- Retired: 2013
Medal record
Representing Kazakhstan
Rhythmic Gymnastics
Grand Prix Final
Bronze medal – third place	2010 Berlin	Hoop
Asian Games
Gold medal – first place	2010 Guangzhou	All-around
Gold medal – first place	2010 Guangzhou	Team
Asian Championships
Gold medal – first place	2009 Astana	Team
Gold medal – first place	2011 Astana	Team
Gold medal – first place	2011 Astana	All-around
Gold medal – first place	2011 Astana	Hoop
Gold medal – first place	2011 Astana	Ball
Gold medal – first place	2011 Astana	Ribbon
Silver medal – second place	2009 Astana	All-around
Silver medal – second place	2009 Astana	Rope
Silver medal – second place	2009 Astana	Hoop
Silver medal – second place	2009 Astana	Ball
Silver medal – second place	2009 Astana	Ribbon
Bronze medal – third place	2011 Astana	Clubs

Anna Romzatovna Alyabyeva (born 13 November 1993, in Astana) is a Kazakhstani individual rhythmic gymnast.

== Career ==
Anna Alyabyeva began to compete in the senior circuit in 2009 as the second gymnasts of her home country. Her highest achievement that year was a top 24 ranking at the 2009 World Rhythmic Gymnastics Championships held in Mie. In 2010 she became the number one gymnast of Kazakhstan after the retirement of Aliya Yussupova. Alyabyeva was invited in Russia's National rhythmic gymnastics training center in Novogorsk under Irina Viner's class; there she improved her difficulty and execution.

Alyabyeva was the 2010 Asian Games All-Around gold medalist. She had her highest placement at the 2010 World Championships in Moscow finishing 7th in the All-Around finals. She won the bronze medal in All-Around at the 2012 World Cup series in Tashkent.

For the 2011 Alyabyeva presented routines with so much difficulty that she wasn't being able to cope and started to have irregular performance in the rhythmic gymnastics circuit. At the 2011 World Rhythmic Gymnastics Championships she lost the control of some pivots at her clubs routine at the All-Around final, and a lost balance while performing with hoop made her lose the apparatus which went out of bound due to the mate being put above of a podium and with no apparatus to replace she had to go down to retrieve her hoop, she finished in the 16th position, one spot behind the deadline for a straight classification to the 2012 Summer Olympics.

In early 2012 she went to the London Prepares Series to compete for a spot in the rhythmic gymnastic event. She finished first through all the contenders, but once again she had very inconsistent results throughout the year. At the individual all-around event at the 2012 Summer Olympics, she placed 15th due to some dirty catches in her ball routine and a disastrous clubs routine where she lost the balance in three very difficult elements (a pencheé pivot of two rotations, a series of passé pivots connected into pencheé rotations and a series of fouette pivots).

Alyabyeva retired after the Olympic season.
