= Tharatip Sridee =

Thai rhythmic gymnast

- Full name: Tharatip Sridee
- Nicknames: Nong Mo, Gymnastics Queen
- Born: February 21, 1987 (age 39) Bangkok, Thailand
- Height: 162 cm (5 ft 4 in)

Gymnastics career
- Discipline: Rhythmic gymnastics
- Country represented: Thailand
- Former coach: Kusumal Prasertsri

Tharatip Sridee (Thai: ธาราทิพย์ ศรีดี; born February 21, 1987) is a Thai former individual rhythmic gymnast who now works as a coach. She was the first Thai rhythmic gymnast to compete at the World Games and won two all-around titles at the SEA Games during her career.

== Career ==
Sridee began gymnastics at age five after her mother enrolled her in weekend classes. She became nicknamed the "Gymnastics Queen" after sweeping all five available gold medals at the Thai national championships. Sridee eventually moved to a school and dormitory near her gym to make training easier.

She was selected to compete at the 2001 SEA Games, before which she intensified her training. There, she won two silver medals. Two years later, she won her first SEA Games gold medal at the 2003 SEA Games, where she won the ribbon final. At the 2005 SEA Games, she placed 4th in the all-around and won the ball final; she also won bronze in the rope final and silver with the ribbon. That year, she also competed at the 2005 World Championships and placed 84th.

At the 2006 Asian Games, Sridee placed 17th. The next year, she competed at the 2007 SEA Games, held in her home country of Thailand, and won the all-around. In the finals, she won an additional gold with hoop and three silvers with the other apparatuses. At the 2007 World Championships, she finished in 89th place, the best result of the Thai team.

By 2009, she had won the Thai national championships nine consecutive years in a row. that year, she became the first Thai gymnast to compete at the World Games. At the 2009 Asian Championships, she placed 10th in the all-around. Later that year, the Thai Gymnastics Association, in hopes of having Sridee qualify for the 2012 Summer Olympics, hired a Russian coach to work with the national team for one year, including eight hours of personal training with Sridee every day. The coach's contract was later extended to three years, and she continued to train and choreograph for Sridee.

At the 2010 Asian Games, Sridee placed 13th in the all-around final. She said she was happy she had improved her score from the qualifying round, but disappointed she had not scored higher with the rope and ball, where she had hoped to rank in the top 8. At the 2010 World Championships, she came in 82nd place.

In 2011, Sridee, then a master's student, received a scholarship for student-athletes from the Sports Authority of Thailand. In June, at the 2011 Asian Championships, she finished 9th in the all-around. She failed to qualify directly for the Olympics at the 2011 World Championships, where she placed 58th, and the Thai Gymnastics Association submitted an application to have her compete as a wildcard entry. The 2011 SEA Games, held in Indonesia, were the last where she competed. She expressed disappointment with her performance on the first day of the all-around competition, though she was provisionally in first place. After the second day, she won the gold medal.

In 2012, she began working with a Bulgarian coach, and she said that while she was considering when to retire, she hoped to compete at the 2013 SEA Games. She was unable to do so, however, as gymnastics and several other sports were not included in that edition of the Games; Sridee spoke of her disappointment over this. Though she initially aimed to win a 12th consecutive national title, she withdrew from the national championships due to hurting her right foot. Instead, she served as a judge for the competition. At the end of the year, she competed at the Thailand National Games and swept all the medals. This was her final competition, and a farewell tribute was organized for her.

== Post-competitive career ==
Sridee earned her bachelor's degree in communication arts at Bangkok University, where she also studied for a master's in business administration. She began coaching and said she hoped to become a sports announcer.
