= Ulyana Trofimova =

Uzbekistani rhythmic gymnast (born 1990)

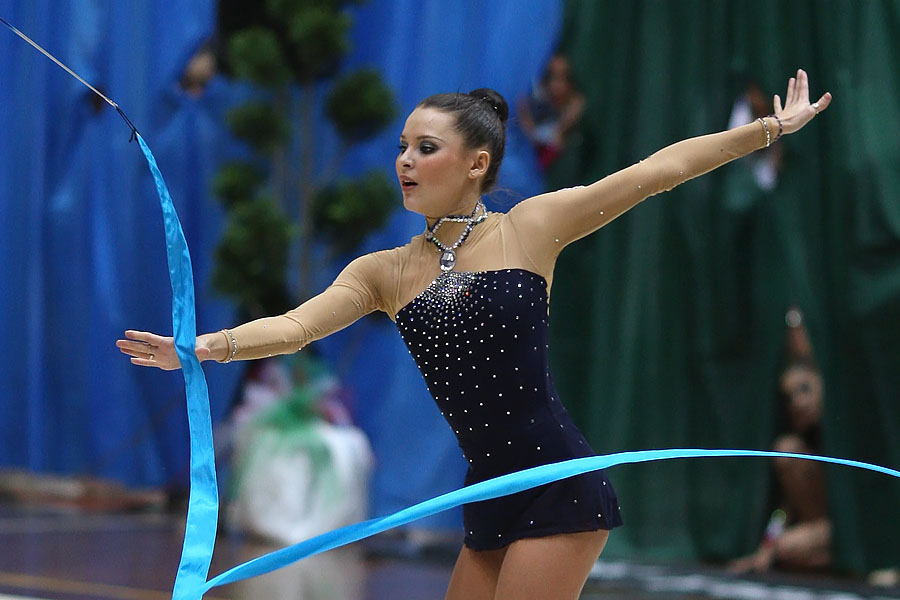
- Trofimova in 2010

Personal information
- Born: 28 February 1990 (age 36) Navoiy Province
- Height: 162 cm (5 ft 4 in)

Gymnastics career
- Discipline: Rhythmic gymnastics
- Country represented: Uzbekistan
- Gym: Novogorsk
- Head coach: Irina Viner
- Assistant coach: Valentina Shevchenko
- Retired: 2012
Medal record
Representing Uzbekistan
Rhythmic Gymnastics
Asian Games
| Silver medal – second place | 2010 Guangzhou | All-around |
| Silver medal – second place | 2010 Guangzhou | Team |
Asian Championships
| Silver medal – second place | 2011 Astana | All-around |
| Silver medal – second place | 2011 Astana | Ribbon |
| Bronze medal – third place | 2009 Astana | Rope |
| Bronze medal – third place | 2009 Astana | Hoop |
| Bronze medal – third place | 2009 Astana | Team |
| Bronze medal – third place | 2011 Astana | Hoop |
| Bronze medal – third place | 2011 Astana | Team |

Ulyana Olyegovna Trofimova (Uzbek: Ульяна Олеговна Трофимова; born 28 February 1990) is an Uzbekistani individual rhythmic gymnast who competed at the 2012 Summer Olympics; she was the first rhythmic gymnast to represent Uzbekistan at the Olympics. She is also the 2010 Asian Games all-around silver medalist and the 2011 Asian silver medalist.

== Career ==
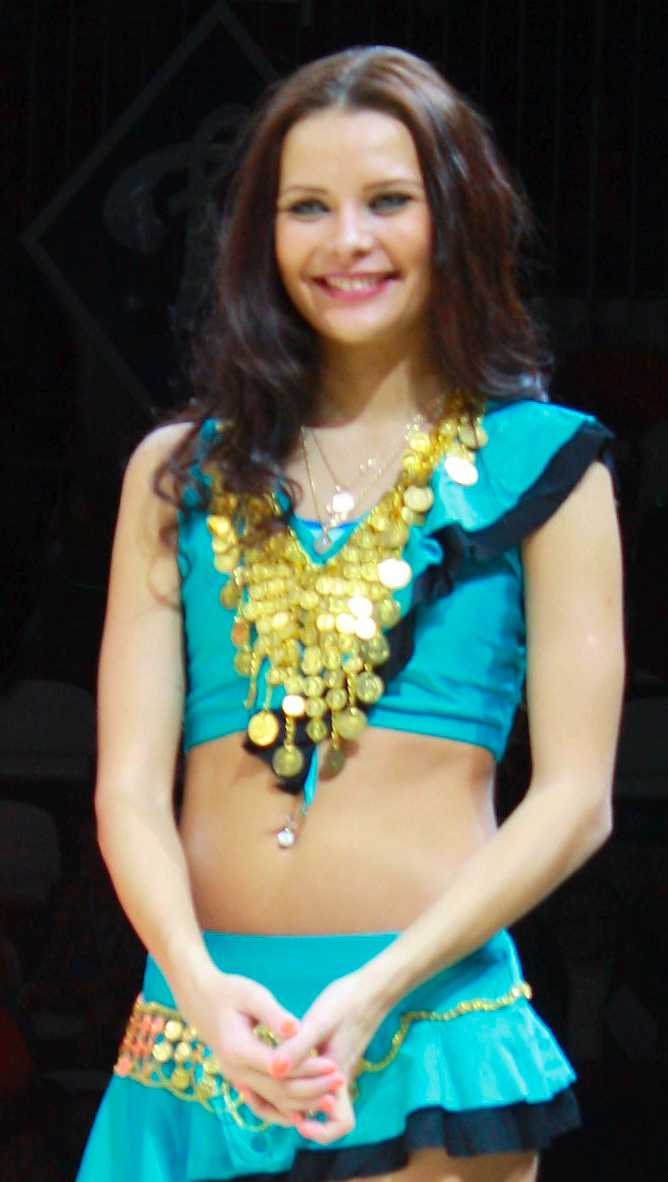
Trofimova at a gala in 2012

Trofimova took up gymnastics at age five in Navoiy, Uzbekistan, when her mother put her in classes. Her parents moved to Moscow in 2004, after which she trained in Novogorsk.

She debuted at the World Championships in 2007, where she finished 21st in the all-around final.

In 2009, Trofimova placed 4th at the 2009 Asian Championships. She also competed at the 2009 World Championships in Mie, Japan, where she placed 12th in the all-around. At the end of the year, she broke her foot and took several months off from competition.

The next year, she won the silver medal in all-around at the 2010 Asian Games. At the 2010 World Championships in Moscow, she again finished 12th in the all-around and was awarded the Alina Kabaeva Prize. Trofimova was presented the award by Kabaeva. She said that she was surprised to receive the award but very pleased, because Kabaeva was her idol.

In 2011, she won the silver medal at the 2011 Asian Championships. In the apparatus finals, she also won silver in ribbon and bronze with hoop. The Uzbekistani team also won bronze in the team event. Later in the year, at the 2011 World Championships, Trofimova placed 9th and qualified to the ribbon and hoop finals. With her placement, she won a quota for the upcoming 2012 Summer Olympics, the first for Uzbekistan.

At the end of 2011, she broke a leg. In early 2012, she ruptured a ligament in her left leg, which caused her to put more training load on her right leg, where she then developed a stress fracture. She went to Germany for treatment, but she was not able to recover in time for the Olympics. At a practice session at the Olympics, she injured herself performing a jump; she was unable to walk and had to be carried off the training mat. The new injury was found to be another stress fracture, and she laid in bed for three days. The day before the competition, her routines were changed to avoid her hurt leg, and she did not have a chance to practice them. Despite her injuries, she competed in the individual all-around event, where she placed 20th in qualifications.

Trofimova retired from competition after the Olympics.

== Personal life ==
Trofimova studied at Moscow Pedagogical State University.

== Routine Music Information ==
| Year | Apparatus | Music title |
|---|---|---|
| 2012 | Hoop | Нанэ цоха (Nane Tsoxa) music from Табор уходит в небо |
| 2012 | Ball | Katjuscha/Mitternacht in Moskau by Studio Tanz Orchester/Klaus Hallen |
| 2012 | Clubs | |
| 2012 | Ribbon | Strauss Jr.(J) : Die Fledermaus Overture by Stanley Black: Mantovani Orchestra |
| 2011 | Hoop (second) | Нанэ цоха (Nane Tsoxa) music from Табор уходит в небо |
| 2011 | Hoop (first) | Vocalise by Lara Fabian & Igor Krutoy |
| 2011 | Ball | Quiero Verte Mal / Carnaval de Paris / Muchachos / Soul Sacrifice by La Mosca Tse Tse / Dario G / La Mosca Tse Tse / Santana |
| 2011 | Clubs | Horizon Part I / Hey Pachuco / My Humps by Safri Duo / DJ Ruslan Nigmatullin / Black Eyed Peas |
| 2011 | Ribbon | Strauss Jr.(J) : Die Fledermaus Overture by Stanley Black: Mantovani Orchestra |
| 2010 | Hoop | Mirage / Snake's Dream / Kirwani (Badmarsh & Shri Remix) music from Salon Oriental 4: Sounds And Sensations / Karma Beats by Night Session / Indiazz / Jolly Mukherjee |
| 2010 | Ball | Quiero Verte Mal / Carnaval de Paris / Muchachos / Soul Sacrifice by La Mosca Tse Tse / Dario G / La Mosca Tse Tse / Santana |
| 2010 | Rope | Hava Nagila |
| 2010 | Ribbon | Flamenco Trip music from One thousand and one nights by Said Mrad |
| 2009 | Hoop | Chase by Bashi-Bazouke |
| 2009 | Ball | Quiero Verte Mal / Carnaval de Paris / Muchachos / Soul Sacrifice by La Mosca Tse Tse / Dario G / La Mosca Tse Tse / Santana |
| 2009 | Rope | Hava Nagila |
| 2009 | Ribbon | Sozalah by Bijan Mortazavi |
| 2007 | Hoop | Symphony No. 25 In G Minor, l. Allegro con brio mix / Flamenco Oriental by Mozart / Dalida |
| 2007 | Clubs | |
| 2007 | Rope | The Whirled You Live by Etherfox |
| 2007 | Ribbon | Paya d'Ora music from Del Tango de la Ciudad de Buenos Aires |
