= Shin Soo-ji =

South Korean rhythmic gymnast

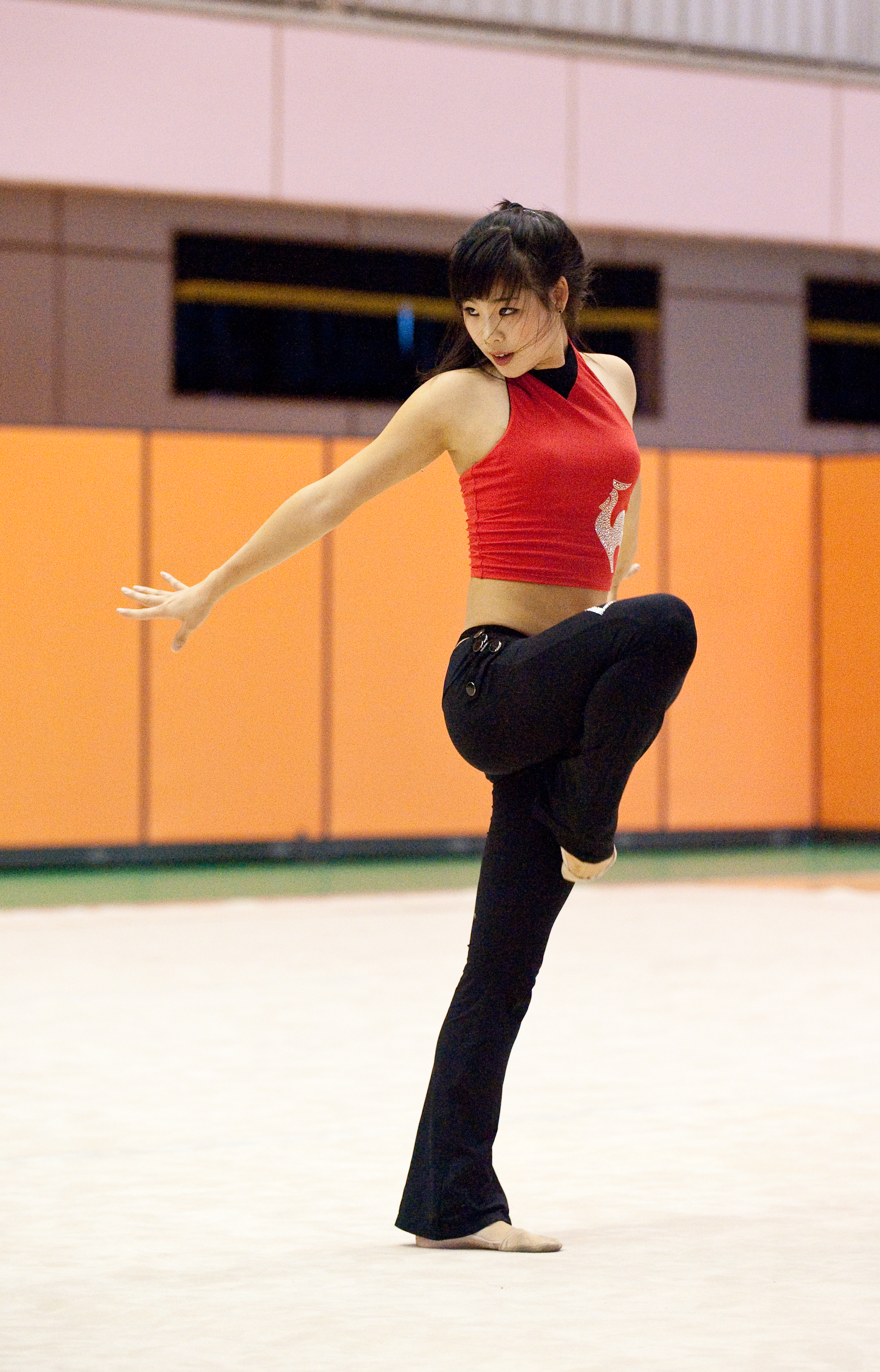
- Shin Soo-ji in 2009

Personal information
- Born: 8 January 1991 (age 35) Songpa-gu, Seoul, South Korea
- Height: 165 cm (5 ft 5 in)

Gymnastics career
- Country represented: South Korea; (South Korea)
- Club: Sejong
- Head coach: Kim Ji-hee
- Assistant coach: Elena Nefedova
- Retired: 2010
Medal record
Rhythmic Gymnastics
Representing South Korea
Asian Championships
Silver medal – second place	2009 Astana	Team
Bronze medal – third place	2009 Astana	All-around
Bronze medal – third place	2009 Astana	Ball

- Shin Soo-ji
- Hangul: 신수지
- Hanja: 申秀智
- RR: Sin Suji
- MR: Sin Suji

Shin Soo-ji (Korean: 신수지 born 8 January 1991) is a South Korean former rhythmic gymnast and bowler. She is the first South Korean rhythmic gymnast to qualify for an all-around final at the World Championships.

== Personal life ==
On January 5, 2018, it was announced that Shin and former Beast member Jang Hyun-seung have been dating for approximately four months.

== Career ==
Shin competed in three World Championships. She had her highest placement finishing 17th in All-around final at the 2007 World Championships. She was a member of the 2008 Korean Olympic squad and qualified for the 2008 Beijing Olympics, but she did not advance into the top 10 finals. Shin ended up finishing 12th at the Beijing Olympics. Shin trained in Russia at a great financial burden to her family, although in 2008 she signed a contract with Sema Sports Marketing.

Shin won the bronze medal in the all-around at the 2009 Asian Championships. She was also a member of the 2010 Korean gymnastics team that took fourth place at the 2010 Asian Games in Guangzhou, China.

After retiring from competitive gymnastics, Shin worked as a commentator at the 2012 London Olympic games. Shin has also appeared on a number of Korean television shows and she has been romantically linked to Korean comedian Heo Kyung Hwan.

In 2013, Shin gained global fame for the gymnastic-style ceremonial first pitch she threw at a baseball match between the Doosan Bears and Samsung Lions at Jamsil Stadium in Seoul, which went viral on YouTube.

In September 2021, Shin entered into a contract with Treasure Hunter, which plans to produce Shin's TikTok, Instagram and YouTube content.

== Filmography ==
=== Television shows ===
Year	Title	Role	Notes	Ref.
2021	Still Alive	Main Cast	Chuseok pilot	
2022	Queen of Ssireum	Participant		

=== Web shows ===
Year	Title	Role	Notes	Ref.
2024	Physical: 100	Contestant	Season 2	
