= Giulia Galtarossa =

Italian rhythmic gymnast

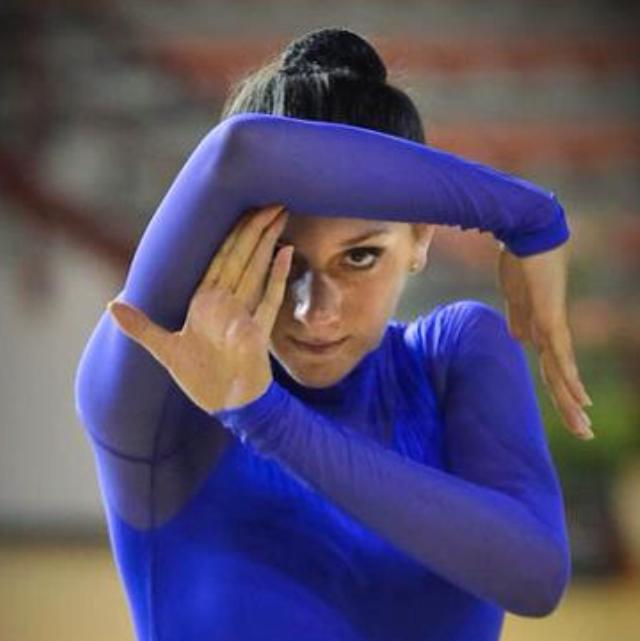

Personal information
- Born: 28 May 1991 (age 35) Padua, Italy

Gymnastics career
- Discipline: Rhythmic gymnastics
- Country represented: Italy; (2009-2010)
- Club: AS Ardor Padova
- Head coach: Emanuela Maccarani
- Retired: yes
Medal record
Representing Italy
World Championships
Gold medal – first place	2009 Mie	Group All-around
Gold medal – first place	2009 Mie	3 Ribbons/ 2 Ropes
Gold medal – first place	2010 Moscow	Group All-around
Silver medal – second place	2009 Mie	5 Hoops
Silver medal – second place	2010 Moscow	5 Hoops
Silver medal – second place	2010 Moscow	3 Ribbons/ 2 Ropes
European Championships
Silver medal – second place	2010 Bremen	Group All-around
Silver medal – second place	2010 Bremen	3 Ribbons/ 2 Ropes
Bronze medal – third place	2010 Bremen	5 Hoops

Giulia Galtarossa (born 28 May 1991) is an Italian retired rhythmic gymnast. She's a multiple gold medallist at the World Championships.

== Career ==
Giulia, as a member of the group, won bronze overall and silver in the two event finals at the 2009 World Cup in Saint Petersburg. Later she won gold in the All-Around and in the two finals in Pesaro. In Minsk the group won two silver and bronze with 3 ribbons and 2 ropes. In September Giulia, Elisa Blanchi, Elisa Santoni, Daniela Masseroni, Romina Laurito and Anzhelika Savrayuk, won gold in the All-Around and with 3 ribbons & 2 ropes as well as silver with 5 hoops at the World Championships in Mie.

In 2010 the group debuted at the World Cup in Portimão taking silver overall and with 5 hoops and gold in the mixed event. In Kalamata they won gold in the All-Around and with 5 hoops, silver with 3 ribbons and 2 ropes. In April she competed at the European Championships in Bremen, winning silve in the All-Around and in the mixed routine, also getting bronze with 5 hoops. In Pesaro the Italian group won all three gold medals. In September Galtarossa, Elisa Blanchi, Romina Laurito, Daniela Masseroni, Elisa Santoni and Anzhelika Savrayuk, retained their All-Around title and got silver in the two finals at the World Championships in Moscow. The following months the group participated in gala events, and helped her club in the Italian club championships.

In early 2011 Giulia and the group were invited to perform at the Sanremo festival. In June she competed in the Italian championships. Being in the reserve group Giulia she went on to participate in events, awards and galas. In September she was an alternate to the World Championships in Montpellier, where the group conquered its third world title. Later she again took part in the club championships.

Giulia performed in the TV show Zelig along Elisa Santoni, Elisa Blanchi, Romina Laurito, Anzhelika Savrayuk, Marta Pagnini, and Andreea Stefanescu. On March 29 she was awarded the "collare d'oro al merito sportivo" for having won two World Championships titles. She retired after Golden Butterfly Gala.

From 2013 to 2016 she was an assistant to the group head coach Emanuela Maccarani. In 2017 and 2018 she performed some galas with other former national group members. In late 2022, along Anna Basta and Nina Corradini, she denounced the abuse she suffered while she was in the national team, saying that the coaching staff was responsible for the development of eating disorders in many girls thanks to a strict diet, daily weight control and harsh comments; also stating that when he was assisting Maccarani she tried to stop the weighting of the gymnasts and the verbal abuse.
