= Centro Sportivo Aeronautica Militare =

- Sport: 12 disciplines
- Jurisdiction: Italy
- Abbreviation: C.S. Aeronautica Militare
- Founded: 1964
- Affiliation: CONI
- Headquarters: Vigna di Valle
- President: Gen. Claudio Salerno

Official website
- www.aeronautica.difesa.it

The Centro Sportivo Aeronautica Militare is the sport section of the Italian Air Force.

== Structure ==
Air Force athletes receive an Air Force rank and salary equivalent to servicemen. They also receive basic military training, although the majority of their training is sport-specific and usually takes place in one of the Air Force sports centers.

== Sports ==
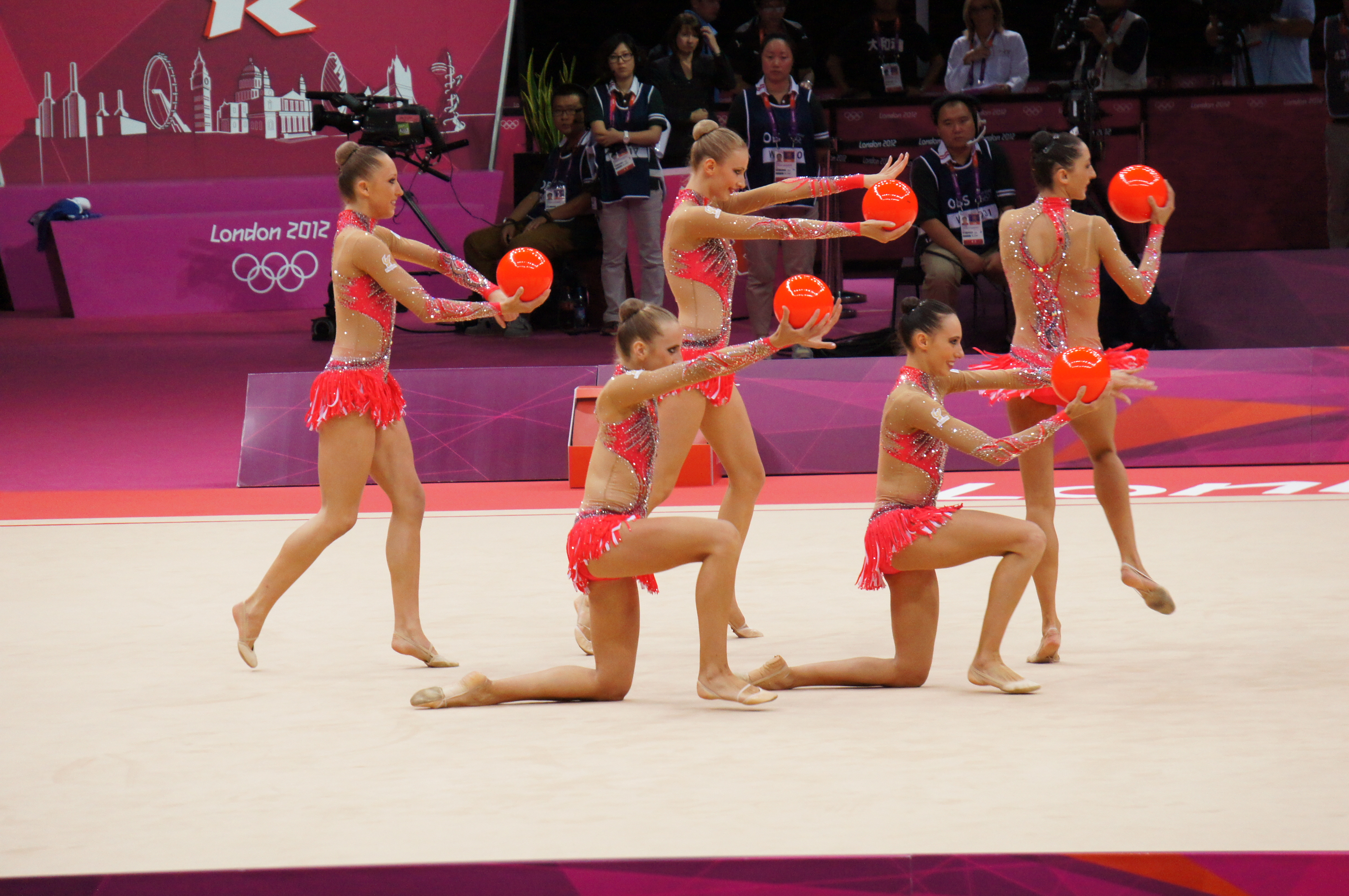
The Aeronautica Militare team of Rhythmic gymnastics bronze medal at London 2012.

There are 12 disciplines of C.S. Aeronnatica Militare.

- Fencing
- Archery
- Athletics
- Artistic gymnastics
- Rhythmic gymnastics
- Equestrianism
- Table Tennis
- Shooting
- Basketball
- Volleyball
- Beach Volleyball
- Sailing

== Notable athletes ==
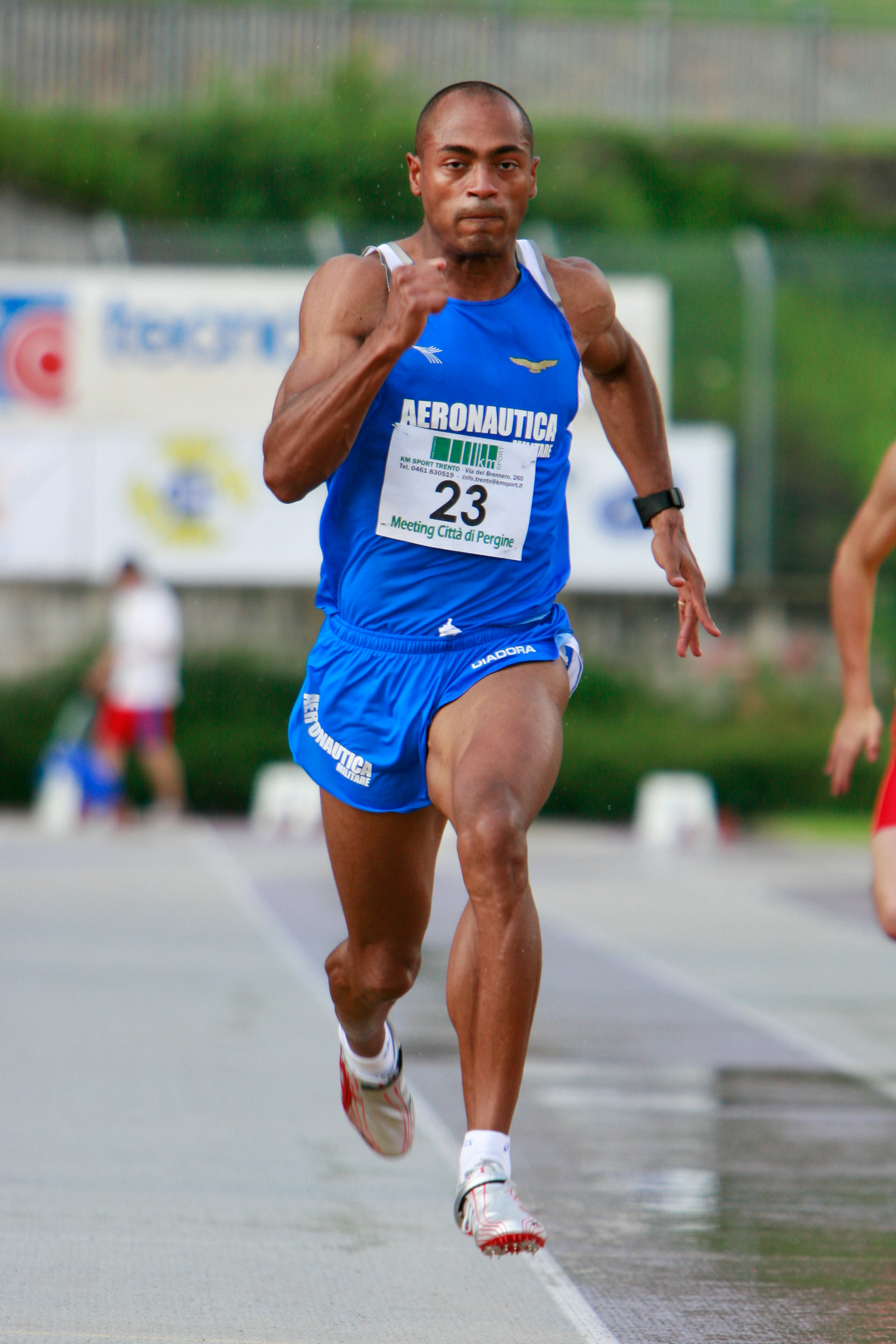
The athlete Jacques Riparelli with the colors of C.S. Aeronautica Militare.

Athletics

- Andrew Howe
- Emanuele Di Gregorio
- Michael Tumi (former, from 2012 pass to G.S. Fiamme Gialle)
- Manuela Levorato

Archery

- Michele Frangilli
- Mauro Nespoli
- Marco Galiazzo

Fencing

- Paolo Pizzo
- Matteo Tagliariol
- Andrea Baldini

=== Athletes at the 2012 Summer Olympics ===
Of the 290 athletes who represented Italy at the 2012 Summer Olympics, 29 were Air Force athletes. These athletes are:

Archery

- Marco Galiazzo
- Michele Frangilli
- Mauro Nespoli
- Pia Lionetti
- Jessica Tomasi

Artistic gymnastics

- Matteo Morandi
- Alberto Busnari
- Enrico Pozzo
- Paolo Ottavi

Athletics

- Jacques Riparelli
- Davide Manenti

Beach volleyball

- Greta Cicolari
- Marta Menegatti

Equestrian

- Vittoria Panizzon

Fencing

- Paolo Pizzo
- Ilaria Salvatori
- Andrea Baldini
- Bianca Del Carretto
- Diego Occhiuzzi
- Nathalie Moellhausen

Rhythmic gymnastics

- Elisa Santoni
- Elisa Blanchi
- Anzhelika Savrayuk
- Romina Laurito
- Andreea Stefanescu
- Marta Pagnini
- Julieta Cantaluppi

Sailing

- Francesca Clapcich

Table tennis

- Mihai Bobocica

== See also ==
- Italian Air Force
- Italian military sports bodies
