= 2010 Rhythmic Gymnastics European Championships =

- Location: Bremen, Germany
- Start date: 16 April 2010
- End date: 18 April 2010

The 26th Rhythmic Gymnastics European Championships was held in Bremen, Germany from 16 to 18 April 2010.

== Medal winners ==
Event	Gold	Silver	Bronze
Senior Individual Finals
All-around	Yevgeniya Kanayeva; Russia	Daria Kondakova; Russia	Aliya Garayeva; Azerbaijan
Senior Groups Finals
All-around	Russia; Daria Shcherbakova; Uliana Donskova; Tatiana Sergeeva; Natalia Pichuzhkina; Anastasia Nazarenko; Ekaterina Malygina	Italy; Elisa Blanchi; Romina Laurito; Giulia Galtarossa; Elisa Santoni; Anzhelika Savrayuk; Daniela Masseroni	Belarus; Maryna Hancharova; Anastasiya Ivankova; Aliaksandra Osipava; Kseniya Sankovich; Alina Tumilovich
5 hoops	Russia; Daria Shcherbakova; Uliana Donskova; Tatiana Sergeeva; Natalia Pichuzhkina; Anastasia Nazarenko; Ekaterina Malygina	Belarus; Maryna Hancharova; Anastasiya Ivankova; Aliaksandra Osipava; Kseniya Sankovich; Alina Tumilovich	Italy; Elisa Blanchi; Romina Laurito; Giulia Galtarossa; Elisa Santoni; Anzhelika Savrayuk; Daniela Masseroni
3 ribbons + 2 ropes	Russia; Daria Shcherbakova; Uliana Donskova; Tatiana Sergeeva; Natalia Pichuzhkina; Anastasia Nazarenko; Ekaterina Malygina	Italy; Elisa Blanchi; Romina Laurito; Giulia Galtarossa; Elisa Santoni; Anzhelika Savrayuk; Daniela Masseroni	Belarus; Maryna Hancharova; Anastasiya Ivankova; Aliaksandra Osipava; Kseniya Sankovich; Alina Tumilovich
Junior Finals
Team	Russia; Alexandra Merkulova; Valeria Tkachenko	Belarus; Arina Charopa; Nataliya Leshchyk	Germany; Jana Berezko-Marggrander; Laura Jung
Rope	Alexandra Merkulova; Russia	Arina Charopa; Belarus	Viktoriia Shynkarenko; Ukraine
Hoop	Valeria Tkachenko; Russia	Nataliya Leshchyk; Belarus	Jana Berezko-Marggrander; Germany
Ball	Alexandra Merkulova; Russia	Lala Yusifova; Azerbaijan	Jana Berezko-Marggrander; Germany
Clubs	Valeria Tkachenko; Russia	Arina Charopa; Belarus	Oleksandra Gridasova; Ukraine

== Results ==
=== Seniors ===
==== Individual all-around ====
Rank	Gymnast	Nation	Rope (rhythmic gymnastics)	Hoop (rhythmic gymnastics)	Ball (rhythmic gymnastics)	Ribbon (rhythmic gymnastics)	Total
1st place, gold medalist(s)	Yevgeniya Kanayeva	Russia	28.950	29.000	29.150	28.800	115.900
2nd place, silver medalist(s)	Daria Kondakova	Russia	28.650	28.400	28.575	28.100	113.725
3rd place, bronze medalist(s)	Aliya Garayeva	Azerbaijan	27.925	27.800	27.900	27.750	111.375
4	Liubov Charkashyna	Belarus	27.000	27.600	27.175	27.150	108.875
5	Neta Rivkin	Israel	26.750	27.350	27.250	27.050	108.400
6	Melitina Staniouta	Belarus	27.600	27.900	24.650	27.850	108.000
7	Silviya Miteva	Bulgaria	27.150	26.625	27.500	26.250	107.525
8	Alina Maksymenko	Ukraine	27.100	26.525	27.400	26.400	107.425
9	Caroline Weber	Austria	26.800	26.775	27.050	26.600	107.225
10	Joanna Mitrosz	Poland	26.900	26.725	26.850	26.200	106.675
11	Irina Risenson	Israel	26.675	26.300	26.500	27.100	106.575
12	Delphine Ledoux	France	26.250	26.350	26.600	26.300	105.500
13	Julieta Cantaluppi	Italy	25.550	25.650	26.100	25.925	103.225
14	Ganna Rizatdinova	Ukraine	26.150	25.450	25.800	25.775	103.175
15	Alexandra Piscupescu	Romania	25.650	25.200	25.650	25.650	102.150
16	Carolina Rodriguez	Spain	25.900	25.050	26.050	25.000	102.000
17	Martina Alicata Terranova	Italy	25.200	25.375	25.400	25.250	101.225
18	Michaela Metallidou	Greece	25.200	24.700	25.700	25.125	100.725
19	Zeynab Javadli	Azerbaijan	24.200	24.750	23.900	24.400	97.250
20	Monika Mincheva	Bulgaria	24.550	24.175	25.450	22.950	97.125

==== Group all-around ====
Rank	Nation	Hoop (rhythmic gymnastics)	Ribbon (rhythmic gymnastics) Rope (rhythmic gymnastics)	Total
1st place, gold medalist(s)	Russia	27.100	27.400	54.500
2nd place, silver medalist(s)	Italy	26.600	27.325	53.925
3rd place, bronze medalist(s)	Belarus	26.600	27.000	53.600
4	Germany	26.025	26.125	52.150
5	Spain	25.975	25.950	51.925
6	Bulgaria	25.900	25.375	51.275
7	Israel	25.950	24.700	50.650
8	Azerbaijan	25.625	24.800	50.425
9	Switzerland	24.700	24.925	49.625
10	Hungary	25.100	23.750	48.850
11	Poland	23.725	24.475	48.200
12	Austria	23.525	23.300	46.825
13	France	22.675	23.975	46.650
14	Greece	22.850	23.000	45.850
15	Finland	22.750	22.850	45.600
16	Czech Republic	22.725	21.800	44.525
17	Georgia	23.150	21.300	44.450
18	Slovakia	22.050	21.000	43.050
19	Lithuania	21.375	19.400	40.775
20	Norway	21.450	19.025	40.475
21	United Kingdom	21.075	15.700	36.775

==== Group 5 hoops ====
Rank	Nation	D Score	A Score	E Score	Pen.	Total
1st place, gold medalist(s)	Russia	9.450	9.500	9.250		28.200
2nd place, silver medalist(s)	Belarus	9.250	9.300	9.100		27.650
3rd place, bronze medalist(s)	Italy	9.175	9.350	9.100		27.625
4	Germany	8.650	9.050	8.750		26.450
5	Israel	8.650	8.900	8.650		26.200
6	Bulgaria	8.500	8.850	8.750		26.100
7	Azerbaijan	8.550	8.850	8.700	0.10	26.000
8	Spain	8.525	8.900	8.500		25.925

==== Group 3 ribbons + 2 ropes ====
Rank	Nation	D Score	A Score	E Score	Pen.	Total
1st place, gold medalist(s)	Russia	9.250	9.350	9.000		27.600
2nd place, silver medalist(s)	Italy	9.100	9.300	8.900		27.300
3rd place, bronze medalist(s)	Belarus	9.075	9.250	8.850		27.175
4	Germany	8.550	9.000	8.650		26.200
5	Azerbaijan	8.475	8.950	8.450		25.875
6	Spain	8.550	8.800	8.450		25.800
7	Bulgaria	8.250	8.900	8.500		25.650
8	Switzerland	8.225	8.500	8.150		24.875

=== Juniors ===
==== Team ====
Rank	Nation	Rope (rhythmic gymnastics)	Hoop (rhythmic gymnastics)	Ball (rhythmic gymnastics)	Clubs (rhythmic gymnastics)	Total
1st place, gold medalist(s)	Russia	26.100	24.850	26.700	25.350	103.000
2nd place, silver medalist(s)	Belarus	25.500	26.025	26.450	24.975	102.950
3rd place, bronze medalist(s)	Germany	23.900	25.500	26.000	23.775	99.175
4	Bulgaria	24.750	23.850	25.050	24.200	97.850
5	Azerbaijan	24.100	24.550	25.500	23.625	97.775
6	Ukraine	25.175	23.700	22.750	24.325	95.950
7	Italy	24.250	23.450	24.200	23.600	95.500
8	Israel	24.700	22.375	22.650	24.575	94.300
9	Greece	22.350	23.550	23.800	24.150	93.850
10	Poland	23.775	22.950	23.050	23.800	93.575
11	Spain	22.850	24.300	22.600	23.625	93.375
12	Romania	22.775	23.250	23.750	22.550	92.325
13	Georgia	23.150	22.900	22.300	22.500	90.850
14	Cyprus	22.575	22.450	22.600	23.175	90.800
15	Austria	22.850	22.650	22.600	22.325	90.425
16	Finland	22.150	22.300	22.800	22.625	89.875
17	Czech Republic	21.950	22.225	23.300	22.125	89.600
18	Estonia	22.750	22.900	21.850	21.975	89.475
19	Slovenia	21.400	22.950	23.000	21.325	88.675
20	Hungary	21.800	21.600	22.900	22.225	88.525
21	Turkey	22.150	22.825	22.250	20.625	87.850
22	Latvia	21.650	21.925	22.100	21.975	87.650
23	Lithuania	21.200	22.100	22.200	21.950	87.450
24	Sweden	21.575	21.700	21.750	22.300	87.325
25	Belgium	22.350	20.125	22.850	21.700	87.025
26	Slovakia	21.125	21.650	22.450	21.725	86.950
27	Croatia	21.550	21.250	22.150	21.750	86.700
28	Portugal	20.550	21.300	22.500	21.600	85.950
29	Great Britain	21.250	21.525	21.700	20.700	85.175
30	Norway	20.075	21.475	20.600	20.000	82.150
31	Armenia	18.900	18.200	21.850	22.300	81.250
32	Andorra	17.550	16.950	17.700	17.900	70.100

==== Rope ====
Rank	Gymnast	Nation	D Score	A Score	E Score	Pen.	Total
1st place, gold medalist(s)	Alexandra Merkulova	Russia	7.900	9.400	9.150	0.05	26.400
2nd place, silver medalist(s)	Arina Charopa	Belarus	7.500	9.050	8.750		25.300
3rd place, bronze medalist(s)	Viktoriia Shynkarenko	Ukraine	7.400	8.900	8.950		25.250
4	Anastasiya Kisse	Bulgaria	7.100	8.950	8.600		24.650
5	Aysha Mustafayeva	Azerbaijan	7.250	8.800	8.500		24.550
6	Victoria Veinberg Filanovsky	Israel	7.100	8.850	8.550		24.500
7	Chiara di Battista	Italy	7.100	8.700	8.500		24.300
8	Laura Jung	Germany	7.225	8.600	8.400		24.225

==== Hoop ====
Rank	Gymnast	Nation	D Score	A Score	E Score	Pen.	Total
1st place, gold medalist(s)	Valeria Tkachenko	Russia	7.700	9.200	9.250		26.150
2nd place, silver medalist(s)	Nataliya Leshchyk	Belarus	7.800	9.100	9.200		26.100
3rd place, bronze medalist(s)	Jana Berezko-Marggrander	Germany	7.650	9.100	9.100		25.850
4	Lala Yusifova	Azerbaijan	7.175	8.950	9.000		25.125
5	Yevgeniya Gomon	Ukraine	7.125	8.800	8.750		24.675
6	Dilyana Botseva	Bulgaria	7.100	8.750	8.700	0.10	24.450
7	Evdokia Loukagou	Greece	6.775	8.550	8.500		23.825
8	Eugenya Onopko	Spain	6.950	8.450	8.250	0.05	23.600

==== Ball ====
Rank	Gymnast	Nation	D Score	A Score	E Score	Pen.	Total
1st place, gold medalist(s)	Alexandra Merkulova	Russia	8.025	9.400	9.300	0.05	26.675
2nd place, silver medalist(s)	Lala Yusifova	Azerbaijan	7.700	9.000	8.950		25.650
3rd place, bronze medalist(s)	Jana Berezko-Marggrander	Germany	7.475	9.050	8.950		25.475
4	Nataliya Leshchyk	Belarus	7.550	9.000	8.800		25.350
5	Anastasiya Kisse	Bulgaria	7.400	8.900	8.800		25.100
6	Veronica Bertolini	Italy	7.250	8.750	8.750		24.750
7	Evdokia Loukagou	Greece	7.075	8.300	8.500		23.875
8	Diana Valeanu	Romania	6.900	8.200	8.150		23.250

==== Clubs ====
Rank	Gymnast	Nation	D Score	A Score	E Score	Pen.	Total
1st place, gold medalist(s)	Valeria Tkachenko	Russia	7.650	9.000	8.750		25.400
2nd place, silver medalist(s)	Arina Charopa	Belarus	7.450	8.950	8.950		25.350
3rd place, bronze medalist(s)	Oleksandra Gridasova	Ukraine	7.500	8.800	8.950		25.250
4	Laura Jung	Germany	7.200	8.600	8.800		24.600
5	Victoria Veinberg Filanovsky	Israel	6.900	8.650	8.700		24.250
6	Dilyana Botseva	Bulgaria	6.750	8.600	8.550		23.900
7	Anna Czarniecka	Poland	7.100	8.400	8.050	0.05	23.500
8	Alexia Kyriazi	Greece	6.425	8.500	8.500		23.425

== Medal count ==
=== Seniors ===
Rank	Nation	Gold	Silver	Bronze	Total
1	Russia	4	1	0	5
2	Italy	0	2	1	3
3	Belarus	0	1	2	3
4	Azerbaijan	0	0	1	1
Totals (4 entries)		4	4	4	12

=== Juniors ===
Rank	Nation	Gold	Silver	Bronze	Total
1	Russia	5	0	0	5
2	Belarus	0	4	0	4
3	Azerbaijan	0	1	0	1
4	Germany	0	0	3	3
5	Ukraine	0	0	2	2
Totals (5 entries)		5	5	5	15
