= 2009 World Rhythmic Gymnastics Championships =

International sports competition held in Japan

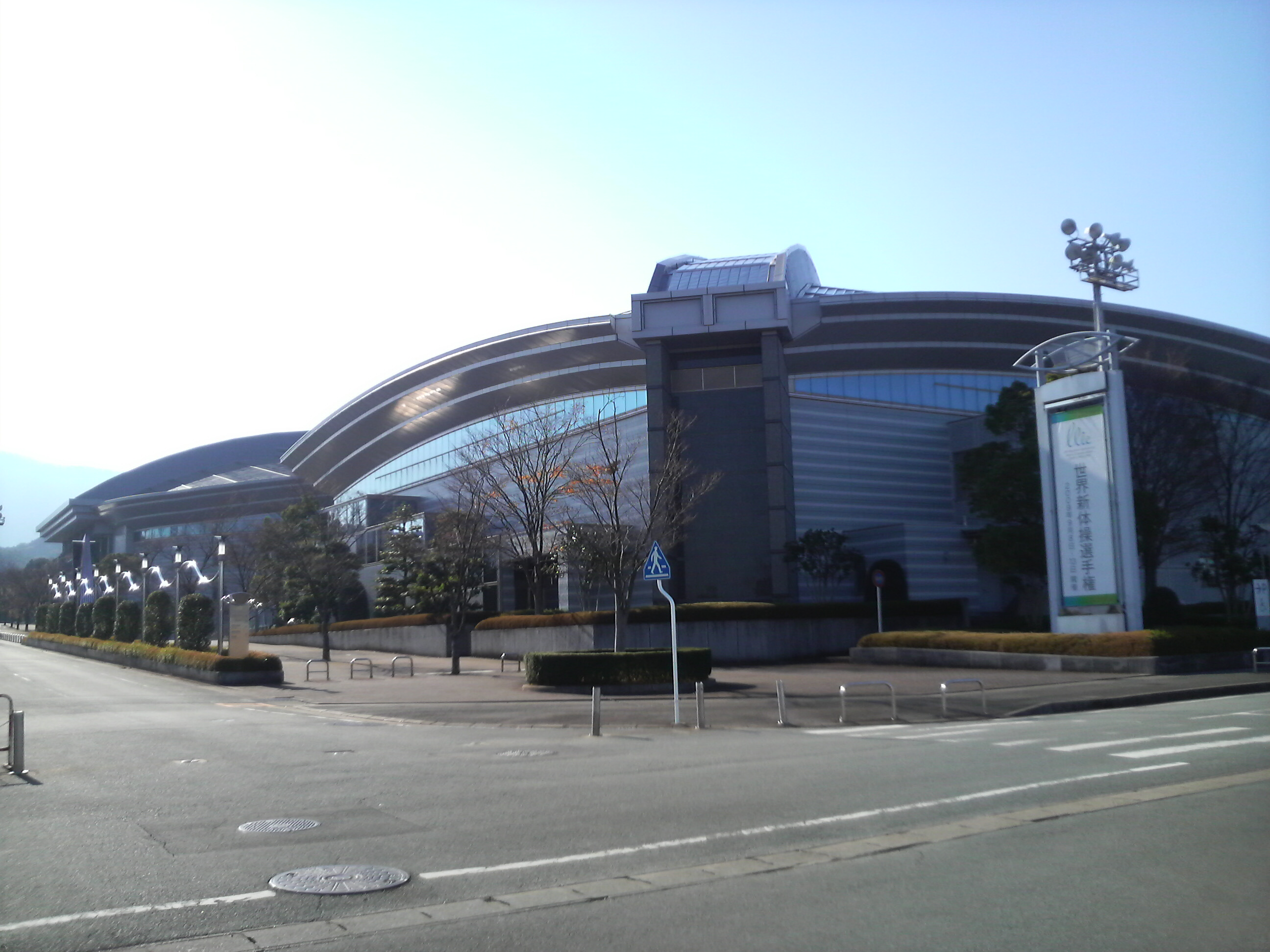
- Sun Arena, where the competition took place
- Venue: Sun Arena
- Location: Ise, Mie, Japan
- Start date: 7 September 2009
- End date: 13 September 2009
- Competitors: 278 from 51 nations

The XXIX World Rhythmic Gymnastics Championships were held in Ise, Mie, Japan, 7–13 September, 2009, at the Sun Arena.

== Overview ==
Six months before the event, a gala was held in the arena with the Japanese national group and individual gymnasts to promote the upcoming Championships.

The event was held in conjunction with a health symposium that focused on the health risks of hyperextension, doping (in particular furosemide, a diuretic drug used by gymnasts to lose weight), and coach education.

=== Background ===
The all-around was expected to be a close competition between Anna Bessonova of Ukraine, the reining World champion from 2007 and the 2004 and 2008 Summer Olympics bronze medalist, and Russian Evgeniya Kanaeva, the 2008 Olympic champion. Bessonova was expected to benefit from a change in the rules at the beginning of the year that put more emphasis on artistry, where she was considered to excel. The two competed against each other at the 2009 Summer Universiade, where Kanaeva won all five individual gold medals, and Bessonova won four of the available silver medals.

Other competitors expected to medal were Olga Kapranova, also from Russia and the 2007 World champion in the hoop and club finals, and Belarussian Melitina Staniouta, who had won silver and bronze medals at multiple events on the 2009 World Cup series.

The Chinese group were the reigning Olympic silver medalists. However, the group withdrew after Sun Dan injured her foot, aggravating an old injury. The reigning Olympic champions were the group from Russia, with the Belarussian group (bronze at the Olympics) expected to challenge for medals as well.

India sent a team for the first time. Due to the poor funding of the sport in India, the team's equipment did not meet international standards, and the team bought a set of equipment at the venue to share. 143 individuals and 24 groups competed, for a total of 278 gymnasts representing 51 countries. One gymnast from Uzbekistan, Kamila Tukhtaeva, competed in both the individual and group events.

=== Format ===
The results of the individual qualification rounds qualified gymnasts to both apparatus finals and the all-around final. 33 countries sent teams, which could consist of three or four gymnasts, who performed a total of 12 routines (three per each of the four apparatuses) in qualifications. The top ten scores in qualifications counted for the team ranking.

=== Event results ===
Kanaeva began the competition by winning the rope and hoop finals; teammate Daria Kondakova won silver in both events. Two days later, she won the ball and ribbon finals as well; Bessonova won silver in the ribbon final and bronze with ball. Aliya Garayeva won silver in the ball final, her first World medal, and Silvia Miteva won bronze in the ribbon final, also her first World medal. The next day, Kanaeva completed her sweep of the event by winning the all-around final. She was the first to win all five individual titles at the World Championships since Oksana Kostina had done so at the 1992 World Championships. Kondakova won silver, and Bessonova was the bronze medalist. Despite finishing in third place, Bessonova put both fists in the air in celebration on the podium; when asked about the gesture's meaning, she said that she was satisfied because she felt as though her performances had reached the audience, which gave her a number of standing ovations.

The Russian gymnasts also won the team event; Kanaeva set a new record by winning six gold medals, which had not been done since the introduction of the team event. The Belarusian team won silver and the Azerbaijani team won bronze.

Bessonova was awarded the Longines Prize for Elegance.

In the group event, Italy won the all-around. Belarus was second, and Russia won bronze. In the event finals, Italy won a second gold in the 3 ribbons + 2 ropes event, followed by Belarus and Russia, while Russia won the 5 hoops final, followed by Italy and Belarus.

== Programme ==
September 7

- Qualifications (Rope, Hoop)

September 8

- Qualifications (Rope, Hoop)
- Opening ceremony
- Rope and hoop finals

September 9

- Qualifications (Ball, Ribbon)

September 10

- Qualifications (Ball, Ribbon)
- Ball and ribbon finals

September 11

- All-around final

September 12

- Group all-around

September 13

- Group event finals
- Closing Ceremony and Gala

== Medal winners ==
Event	Gold	Silver	Bronze
Team Competition
All-Around	Russia; Yevgeniya Kanayeva; Daria Kondakova; Daria Dmitrieva; Olga Kapranova	Belarus; Melitina Staniouta; Svetlana Rudalova; Liubov Charkashyna	Azerbaijan; Zeynab Javadli; Anna Gurbanova; Aliya Garayeva
Individual Finals
Rope	Yevgeniya Kanayeva (RUS)	Daria Kondakova (RUS)	Anna Bessonova (UKR)
Hoop	Yevgeniya Kanayeva (RUS)	Daria Kondakova (RUS)	Melitina Staniouta (BLR)
Ball	Yevgeniya Kanayeva (RUS)	Aliya Garayeva (AZE)	Anna Bessonova (UKR)
Ribbon	Yevgeniya Kanayeva (RUS)	Anna Bessonova (UKR)	Sylvia Miteva (BUL)
All-Around	Yevgeniya Kanayeva (RUS)	Daria Kondakova (RUS)	Anna Bessonova (UKR)
Groups Finals
All-Around	Italy; Elisa Blanchi; Giulia Galtarossa; Elisa Santoni; Daniela Masseroni; Romina Laurito; Anzhelika Savrayuk	Belarus; Alesia Babushkina; Maryna Hancharova; Anastasia Ivankova; Ksenia Sankovich; Alina Tumilovich; Dzina Haitsiukevich	Russia; Uliana Donskova; Daria Koroleva; Anastasia Maksimova; Ekaterina Malygina; Natalia Pichuzhkina; Daria Shcherbakova
5 Hoops	Russia; Uliana Donskova; Daria Koroleva*; Anastasia Maksimova; Ekaterina Malygina; Natalia Pichuzhkina; Daria Shcherbakova	Italy; Elisa Blanchi; Giulia Galtarossa; Elisa Santoni; Daniela Masseroni*; Romina Laurito; Anzhelika Savrayuk	Belarus; Alesia Babushkina; Maryna Hancharova*; Anastasia Ivankova; Ksenia Sankovich; Alina Tumilovich; Dzina Haitsiukevich
3 Ribbons + 2 Ropes	Italy; Elisa Blanchi; Giulia Galtarossa*; Elisa Santoni; Daniela Masseroni; Romina Laurito; Anzhelika Savrayuk	Belarus; Alesia Babushkina*; Maryna Hancharova; Anastasia Ivankova; Ksenia Sankovich; Alina Tumilovich; Dzina Haitsiukevich	Russia; Uliana Donskova; Daria Koroleva; Anastasia Maksimova; Ekaterina Malygina; Natalia Pichuzhkina; Daria Shcherbakova*

* reserve gymnast

== Results ==
=== Individual and team All-Around and Qualifications ===
Nation/Gymnasts	Rope (rhythmic gymnastics)	Hoop (rhythmic gymnastics)	Ball (rhythmic gymnastics)	Ribbon (rhythmic gymnastics)	Total
Russia (1)	85.450	84.950	83.275	82.675	282.175
Yevgeniya Kanayeva	28.900	28.775	28.300	28.425	86.100 (1)
Daria Kondakova	28.350	28.250	27.475	26.700	84.075 (2)
Daria Dmitrieva			27.500		27.500 (138)
Olga Kapranova	28.200	27.925		27.550	83.675 (3)
Belarus (2)	78.575 (2)	79.050 (2)	79.575 (2)	75.775 (3)	262.825
Melitina Staniouta	27.050	26.800	27.400	24.950	81.250 (5)
Svetlana Rudalova	25.850	25.200	25.700	25.200	76.750 (14)
Liubov Charkashyna	25.675	27.050	26.475	25.625	79.200 (9)
Azerbaijan (3)	77.150 (4)	77.600 (3)	74.875 (6)	75.725 (4)	258.525
Zeynab Javadli	24.575	24.175	22.650	24.550	73.300 (29)
Anna Gurbanova	26.300	26.300	24.900	25.750	78.350 (10)
Aliya Garayeva	26.275	27.125	27.325	25.425	80.725 (6)
Ukraine (4)	77.350 (3)	74.900 (7)	77.550 (3)	77.225 (2)	257.750
Anna Bessonova	27.000	25.000	27.325	27.475	81.800 (4)
Alina Maksymenko	25.775	25.200	25.075	24.875	76.050 (18)
Ganna Rizatdinova	24.575	24.700	25.150	24.875	74.725 (23)
Bulgaria (5)	76.375 (5)	76.375 (4)	76.725 (4)	73.750 (7)	255.800
Filipa Simeonova	23.975	24.525	25.200	23.450	73.700 (27)
Monika Mincheva	25.525	25.100	24.950	24.550	75.575 (19)
Sylvia Miteva	26.875	26.750	26.575	25.750	80.200 (7)
Kazakhstan (6)	75.950 (6)	75.975 (5)	76.500 (5)	75.275 (5)	254.775
Anna Alyabyeva	25.100	25.600	25.500	24.375	76.200 (15)
Aliya Yussupova	25.450	25.725	26.125	26.350	78.200 (11)
Marina Petrakova	25.400	24.650	24.875	24.550	74.925 (20)
Israel (7)	73.900 (8)	75.750 (6)	73.900 (7)	73.775 (6)	252.550
Irina Risenson	26.725	26.700	26.625	26.225	80.050 (8)
Neta Rivkin	24.425	26.050	24.675	25.375	76.100 (16)
Coral Kremer	22.750	23.000	22.600		68.350 (64)
Dana Adiv				22.175	22.175 (141)
Italy (8)	74.425 (7)	72.500 (8)	71.850 (11)	72.275 (8)	244.750
Andreea Stefanescu	24.250	23.375			47.625 (124)
Federica Febbo			24.050	24.300	48.350 (123)
Chiara Ianni	24.450	23.800	23.875	22.925	72.125 (36)
Julieta Cantaluppi	25.725	25.325	23.925	25.050	76.100 (17)
Japan (9)	73.625 (9)	69.375 (15)	73.500 (8)	70.100 (10)	242.450
Mai Hidaka	25.150	22.600	24.900	24.550	74.600 (24)
Yuria Onuki	24.600	23.625	24.025	24.000	72.625 (32)
Mimi Inoue	23.875	23.150		21.550	68.575 (61)
Riko Anakubo			24.575		24.575 (139)
Georgia (10)	71.900 (11)	70.100 (13)	73.175 (9)	68.900 (12)	239.750
Mzevinari Samukashvili	24.475	23.950	25.700	24.575	74.750 (22)
Irine Khoperia	23.275	23.475		22.425	69.175 (51)
Tsitsia Mkervali	24.150	22.675	23.600		70.425 (43)
Ketevan Khatiashvili			23.875	21.900	45.775 (125)
Poland (11)	69.875 (15)	70.475 (11)	69.850 (13)	68.050 (17)	237.250
Joanna Narolska	20.850	21.375	20.825	20.175	63.050 (92)
Angelika Paradowska	22.875	23.150	23.175	22.625	69.200 (50)
Joanna Mitrosz	26.150	25.950	25.850	25.250	77.950 (12)
Turkey (11)	71.600 (12)	70.275 (12)	71.925 (10)	68.850 (13)	237.250
Pinar Akilveren	23.750	23.050	24.800	22.950	71.600 (37)
Gozde Ozkebapci	24.250	23.050	23.900	22.450	71.200 (40)
Burcin Neziroglu	23.600	24.175	23.225	23.450	71.225 (39)
China (13)	72.350 (10)	69.025 (16)	69.775 (16)	70.225 (9)	237.075
Hongyang Li	23.950	24.100	24.375	22.100	72.425 (35)
Ding Yidan	23.450	22.725	22.600	24.100	70.275 (46)
Senyue Deng	24.950			24.025	48.975 (122)
Yanan Hou		22.200	22.800		45.000 (127)
Austria (14)	70.800 (14)	71.575 (9)	69.825 (14)	68.125 (16)	236.750
Caroline Weber	24.750	24.775	24.900	24.550	74.425 (25)
Selina Poestinger	23.000	23.300	22.425	22.425	68.725 (57)
Nicol Ruprecht	23.050	23.500	22.500	21.150	69.050 (52)
Uzbekistan (15)	68.950 (17)	70.500 (10)	71.350 (12)	68.575 (14)	236.325
Kamila Tukhtaeva	21.700	21.525	22.350	21.525	65.575 (76)
Djamila Rahmatova	22.550	23.075	22.850	22.300	68.475 (62)
Ulyana Trofimova	24.700	25.900	26.150	24.750	76.800 (13)
Slovenia (16)	68.200 (19)	70.025 (14)	69.800 (15)	67.600 (18)	234.525
Pia Arhar		22.300	21.600	20.450	64.350 (83)
Grusa Kocica	20.650				20.650 (142)
Tjaša Šeme	22.800	23.725	23.575	23.100	70.400 (45)
Mojca Rode	24.750	24.000	24.625	24.050	73.425 (28)
Greece (17)	71.275 (13)	68.400 (18)	68.500 (17)	69.150 (11)	233.775
Michaela Metallidou	24.650	24.150	23.675	24.300	73.100 (31)
Evangelia Gkountroumpi	23.500	22.650	22.875	22.575	69.025 (53)
Ioanna Tacha	23.125	21.600	21.950		66.675 (74)
Aikaterini Giakoumelou				22.275	22.275 (140)
Cyprus (18)	68.850 (18)	67.750 (20)	66.875 (18)	68.375 (15)	228.825
Chrystalleni Trikomiti	23.450	22.700	23.125	22.750	69.325 (49)
Loukia Trikomitou	22.700	22.700	23.075	22.825	68.600 (59)
Katerina Christodoulou	22.700	22.350	20.675	22.800	67.850 (66)
Portugal (19)	68.975 (16)	69.000 (17)	66.800 (19)	67.550 (19)	228.650
Ines Neves Gomes	23.550	23.800	23.025	23.450	70.800 (42)
Sara Rodrigues Caladas	22.125	22.900	22.050	22.150	67.175 (71)
Jessica Figueira Jardim	23.300		21.725		45.025 (126)
Susana Bento Loureiro Abrantes		22.300		21.950	44.250 (128)
Latvia (20)	66.025 (21)	66.275 (22)	66.275 (20)	66.175 (20)	223.500
Diana Kelehsashvili	21.350	20.800	21.000	20.450	63.150 (90)
Yelena Meyerzone	21.775	21.900	22.975	22.425	67.300 (69)
Yana Isakova	22.900	23.575	22.300	23.300	69.775 (47)
Finland (21)	66.525 (20)	68.150 (19)	65.300 (22)	65.250 (22)	223.025
Julia Huuhtanen	21.400	22.125	21.100	21.100	64.625 (81)
Julia Romanjuk	23.000	23.300	22.300	21.925	68.600 (60)
Johanna Vikkula	22.125	22.725	21.900	22.225	67.075 (72)
Australia (22)	65.625 (24)	67.425 (21)	64.725 (24)	65.575 (21)	222.550
Ayiesha Johnston	23.350	23.875	22.550	24.300	71.525 (38)
Chloe Hayes		21.225	21.600	20.225	63.050 (91)
Janine Murray	20.975	22.325		21.050	64.350 (82)
Danielle Prince	21.300		20.575		41.875 (129)
United Kingdom (23)	65.950 (22)	66.250 (23)	66.000 (21)	60.450 (30)	219.725
Jade Faulkner	21.750	21.100	21.325	17.825	64.175 (85)
Francesca Fox	21.200	22.250	21.650	21.250	65.150 (77)
Francesca Jones	23.000	22.900	23.025	21.375	68.925 (55)
Malaysia (24)	65.275 (26)	64.325 (24)	64.025 (25)	65.200 (23)	219.650
Wan Siti Haniza Wan Izahar	20.625	19.450	21.450	21.325	63.400 (89)
Nur Hidayah Abdul Wahid	21.550	22.700	19.725	20.850	65.100 (79)
Elaine Koon	23.100	22.175	22.850	23.025	68.975 (54)
Sweden (25)	64.475 (28)	62.750 (30)	64.775 (23)	64.225 (25)	216.575
Jennifer Pettersson	20.775	19.025	20.925	20.850	62.550 (98)
Mikaela Lindholm	20.650	20.625	21.100	21.075	62.825 (96)
Therese Larsson	23.050	23.100	22.750	22.300	68.900 (56)
Canada (26)	65.900 (23)	63.450 (27)	62.250 (30)	64.300 (24)	216.250
Demetra Mantcheva	22.225	21.500	19.825	21.975	65.700 (75)
Alexandra Martincek	22.875	21.900	20.775	22.500	67.275 (70)
Elena Gouzenkova	20.800	20.050	21.650	19.825	62.500 (99)
Estonia (27)	64.550 (27)	63.325 (28)	63.950 (26)	63.725 (26)	215.175
Carina Kukk	21.450	21.475	20.375	21.925	64.850 (80)
Tatiana Puchkina	20.825	20.000	21.000	20.400	62.225 (100)
Julija Makushina	22.275	21.850	22.575	21.400	66.700 (73)
Mexico (28)	64.325 (29)	63.775 (26)	63.325 (28)	62.875 (27)	214.675
Rut Castillo	22.850	22.375	23.225	21.250	68.450 (63)
Veronica Navarro		21.450	20.300	21.800	63.550 (87)
Alejandra Vazquez	20.375	19.950	19.800		60.125 (110)
Yeraldine Alarcon	21.100			19.825	40.925 (132)
Brazil (29)	62.725 (30)	63.275 (29)	62.575 (29)	61.200 (29)	211.200
Rafaela Pedral Costa	19.225	19.500	20.700	19.400	59.600 (114)
Eliane Rosa Sampaio	20.825	21.375	19.350	20.800	63.000 (95)
Ana Paula Scheffer	22.675	22.400	22.525	21.000	67.600 (68)
Chinese Taipei (30)	62.675 (31)	60.975 (31)	63.425 (27)	58.850 (32)	207.800
Yi-Chieh Wang	20.800	20.100	21.050		61.950 (102)
Pei-Lung Yu	20.625	20.800		20.725	62.150 (101)
Ying-Tzu Lai		20.075	20.175	18.550	58.800 (119)
Li-Ting Lee	21.250		22.200	19.575	63.025 (93)
Norway (31)	60.250 (33)	60.975 (31)	61.175 (31)	62.650 (28)	206.975
Hanna-Kristine Bogetveit	20.725	22.100	21.800	21.225	65.125 (78)
Frida Parnas	19.050		19.325	21.175	59.550 (115)
Josefine Hustoft	20.475	19.025			39.500 (136)
Thea Elise Holte		19.850	20.050	20.250	60.150 (109)
South Africa (32)	60.325 (32)	57.025 (33)	59.725 (32)	59.100 (31)	198.950
Grace Legote	19.800		20.325	19.300	59.425 (117)
Sibongile Mjekula	20.575	18.225	19.600	19.725	59.900 (112)
Yvonne Garland		19.000		20.075	39.075 (137)
Julene Van Rooyen	19.950	19.800	19.800		59.550 (116)
India (33)	38.250 (34)	40.975 (34)	38.100 (34)	44.825 (33)	137.650
Pooja Surve		13.100	13.400	15.275	41.775 (130)
Sadichchha Kulkarni	12.400	13.600		14.700	40.700 (133)
Mitali Dogra	13.100	14.275	12.600		39.975 (134)
Akshata Shete	12.750		12.100	14.850	39.700 (135)

Individual competitors

- (Armenia) Anzhelika Afiyan
- (Armenia) Naira Minasyan
- (Belgium) Lieselotte Diels
- (Chile) Stephanie Belen Estrada
- (Croatia) Nika Roberta Crevatini
- (Croatia) Anamarija Zhelimorski
- (Egypt) Yasmin Rostm
- (Egypt) Marize Shawky Farid
- (Spain) Marina Fernandez
- (Spain) Carolina Rodriguez
- (France) Delphine Ledoux
- (Hungary) Fanni Dalma Forray
- (Hungary) Dora Vass
- (South Korea) Lee Kyung-hwa
- (South Korea) Shin Soo-ji
- (Lithuania) Jurgita Lionginaviciute
- (Lithuania) Egle Sileikyte
- (Namibia) Nicole Bierbach
- (Romania) Andrada Andriana Anton
- (Romania) Stefania Chiriac
- (Serbia) Vojislava Cekerevac
- (Serbia) Snezana Paunic
- (Slovakia) Jana Duchnovska
- (United States) Ava Gehringer
- (United States) Julie Zetlin

=== Individual Finals ===
==== All-Around ====
Place	Name	Rope (rhythmic gymnastics)	Hoop (rhythmic gymnastics)	Ball (rhythmic gymnastics)	Ribbon (rhythmic gymnastics)	Total
1st place, gold medalist(s)	Yevgeniya Kanayeva (RUS)	28.650	28.550	28.150	28.500	113.850
2nd place, silver medalist(s)	Daria Kondakova (RUS)	28.400	28.500	27.950	28.400	113.250
3rd place, bronze medalist(s)	Anna Bessonova (UKR)	26.650	27.900	28.200	27.625	110.375
4	Melitina Staniouta (BLR)	27.225	27.300	27.425	27.100	109.050
5	Sylvia Miteva (BUL)	26.875	27.125	26.850	27.000	107.850
6	Irina Risenson (ISR)	26.850	25.600	26.900	26.950	106.300
7	Liubov Charkashyna (BLR)	26.600	26.650	26.550	26.400	106.200
8	Aliya Garayeva (AZE)	25.550	26.900	26.900	26.325	105.675
9	Anna Gurbanova (AZE)	26.050	26.425	26.300	25.600	104.375
10	Joanna Mitrosz (POL)	25.775	26.700	26.075	25.650	104.200
11	Aliya Yussupova (KAZ)	25.775	25.750	26.225	25.950	103.700
12	Ulyana Trofimova (UZB)	25.675	25.350	26.200	25.550	102.775
13	Julieta Cantaluppi (ITA)	25.650	25.350	25.700	24.675	101.375
14	Neta Rivkin (ISR)	24.950	26.350	24.775	25.050	101.125
15	Mai Hidaka (JPN)	25.075	24.850	25.150	25.000	100.075
16	Alina Maksymenko (UKR)	25.825	23.600	24.775	25.350	99.550
17	Anna Alyabyeva (KAZ)	24.425	24.650	25.600	24.475	99.150
18	Caroline Weber (AUT)	25.175	24.900	24.750	24.225	99.050
19	Delphine Ledoux (FRA)	24.325	25.000	25.075	24.475	98.875
20	Monika Mincheva (BUL)	24.850	24.300	25.375	23.825	98.350
21	Mzevinari Samukashvili (GEO)	23.875	23.950	24.975	24.300	97.100
22	Carolina Rodriguez Ballesteros (ESP)	24.350	24.550	25.025	22.450	96.375
23	Mojca Rode (SLO)	24.175	24.325	24.100	22.475	95.075
24	Dora Vass (HUN)	23.850	21.925	23.800	23.725	93.300

==== Rope ====
Place	Name	Dif.	Art.	Exe.	Pen.	Total
1st place, gold medalist(s)	Yevgeniya Kanayeva (RUS)	9.250	9.700	9.400		28.350
2nd place, silver medalist(s)	Daria Kondakova (RUS)	9.075	9.450	9.350	0.05	27.825
3rd place, bronze medalist(s)	Anna Bessonova (UKR)	8.975	9.400	9.200		27.575
4	Melitina Staniouta (BLR)	8.850	9.150	9.100		27.100
5	Anna Gurbanova (AZE)	8.400	8.950	8.900		26.250
6	Irina Risenson (ISR)	8.300	8.950	9.000	0.05	26.200
7	Aliya Garayeva (AZE)	8.450	9.050	8.700	0.10	26.100
8	Sylvia Miteva (BUL)	8.375	8.900	8.600		25.875

==== Hoop ====
Place	Name	Dif.	Art.	Exe.	Pen.	Total
1st place, gold medalist(s)	Yevgeniya Kanayeva (RUS)	9.425	9.600	9.300		28.325
2nd place, silver medalist(s)	Daria Kondakova (RUS)	9.325	9.450	9.450		28.225
3rd place, bronze medalist(s)	Melitina Staniouta (BLR)	8.950	9.100	9.100		27.150
4	Sylvia Miteva (BUL)	8.725	9.150	9.150		27.025
5	Aliya Garayeva (AZE)	8.875	9.050	8.950		26.875
6	Liubov Charkashyna (BLR)	8.750	9.150	8.800		26.700
7	Irina Risenson (ISR)	8.475	9.050	9.050		26.575
8	Anna Gurbanova (AZE)	8.800	8.850	8.800		26.450

==== Ball ====
Place	Name	Dif.	Art.	Exe.	Pen.	Total
1st place, gold medalist(s)	Yevgeniya Kanayeva (RUS)	9.375	9.550	9.650		28.575
2nd place, silver medalist(s)	Aliya Garayeva (AZE)	8.975	9.200	9.200	0.05	27.325
3rd place, bronze medalist(s)	Anna Bessonova (UKR)	8.550	9.450	9.250		27.250
4	Daria Dmitrieva (RUS)	8.775	9.150	9.300		27.225
5	Melitina Staniouta (BLR)	8.825	9.150	9.200	0.05	27.125
6	Liubov Charkashyna (BLR)	8.700	9.200	9.150		27.050
7	Irina Risenson (ISR)	8.550	9.200	9.200	0.05	26.900
8	Sylvia Miteva (BUL)	8.500	9.100	9.100		26.700

==== Ribbon ====
Place	Name	Dif.	Art.	Exe.	Pen.	Total
1st place, gold medalist(s)	Yevgeniya Kanayeva (RUS)	9.000	9.600	9.400		28.000
2nd place, silver medalist(s)	Anna Bessonova (UKR)	9.000	9.500	9.400		27.900
3rd place, bronze medalist(s)	Sylvia Miteva (BUL)	8.750	9.050	9.050		26.850
4	Liubov Charkashyna (BLR)	8.550	9.150	9.050		26.750
5	Irina Risenson (ISR)	8.350	9.200	9.100		26.650
6	Olga Kapranova (RUS)	8.250	9.350	8.900	0.10	26.400
7	Anna Gurbanova (AZE)	8.450	9.100	8.850	0.05	26.350
8	Aliya Yussupova (KAZ)	8.300	9.100	8.850	0.05	26.200

=== Groups ===
==== Group compositions ====
- (Austria) Nina Elleberger
- (Austria) Stefanie Pikl
- (Austria) Melissa Schmidt
- (Austria) Natascha Strobel
- (Austria) Lena Vertacnik
- (Azerbaijan) Dina Gorina
- (Azerbaijan) Jeyla Guliyeva
- (Azerbaijan) Vafa Huseynova
- (Azerbaijan) Anastasiya Prasolova
- (Azerbaijan) Stefani Trayanova
- (Azerbaijan) Valeriya Yegay
- (Belarus) Alesia Babushkina
- (Belarus) Dzina Haitsiukevich
- (Belarus) Maryna Hancharova
- (Belarus) Nastassia Ivankova
- (Belarus) Kseniya Sankovich
- (Belarus) Alina Tumilovich
- (Brazil) Ana Paula Alencar
- (Brazil) Nathane Cassia Garcia
- (Brazil) Jéssica Terezinha Oliveira
- (Brazil) Natalia Peixinho Sanchez
- (Brazil) Ana Paula Ribeiro
- (Bulgaria) Eleonora Kezhova
- (Bulgaria) Mihaela Maevska
- (Bulgaria) Kristina Rangelova-Yankova
- (Bulgaria) Stela Sultanova
- (Bulgaria) Galina Tancheva
- (Bulgaria) Vladislava Tancheva
- (Canada) Rose Cossar
- (Canada) Rylee Haubrich
- (Canada) Alexandra Lukashova
- (Canada) Kelsey Titmarsh
- (Canada) Stefani Viinamae
- (Czech Republic) Dominika Cervinkova
- (Czech Republic) Aneta Fujdiarova
- (Czech Republic) Nataly Hamrikova
- (Czech Republic) Ludmila Korytova
- (Czech Republic) Olivia Caroline Mala
- (Czech Republic) Vendula Zamorska
- (Spain) Loreto Achaerandio
- (Spain) Sandra Aguilar
- (Spain) Sara Garvin
- (Spain) Ana María Pelaz
- (Spain) Alejandra Quereda
- (Spain) Lidia Redondo
- (Finland) Carita Groenholm
- (Finland) Sirja Kokkonen
- (Finland) Riina Maatta
- (Finland) Vanessa Martins Lopes
- (Finland) Minna Puro
- (France) Florine Dally
- (France) Cecilia Ferrier
- (France) Melanie Haag
- (France) Jeanne Isenmann
- (France) Ketty Martel
- (France) Priscillia Thomas
- (Germany) Maike Deuschle
- (Germany) Johanna Gabor
- (Germany) Camilla Pfeffer
- (Germany) Sara Radman
- (Germany) Karolina Raskina
- (Greece) Afroditi Georgovasili
- (Greece) Alexandra Georgovasili
- (Greece) Vasiliki Maniou
- (Greece) Antonia Papaioannou
- (Greece) Maria Spanoudaki
- (Greece) Despoina Tzimpoula
- (Hungary) Maria Dudinszky
- (Hungary) Judith Hauser
- (Hungary) Noemi Horcher
- (Hungary) Fanni Kohlhoffer
- (Hungary) Anna Tokes
- (Hungary) Daria Topic
- (Israel) Olena Dvornichenko
- (Israel) Maria Savenkov
- (Israel) Rahel Vigdorchick
- (Israel) Veronika Vitenberg
- (Israel) Polina Zakaluzny
- (Italy) Elisa Blanchi
- (Italy) Giulia Galtarossa
- (Italy) Romina Laurito
- (Italy) Daniela Masseroni
- (Italy) Elisa Santoni
- (Italy) Anzhelika Savrayuk
- (Japan) Yuka Endo
- (Japan) Chihana Hara
- (Japan) Saori Inagaki
- (Japan) Nachi Misawa
- (Japan) Kotono Tanaka
- (Japan) Honami Tsuboi
- (Kazakhstan) Madina Iskanderova
- (Kazakhstan) Mizana Ismailova
- (Kazakhstan) Ravilya Rafikova
- (Kazakhstan) Dinara Serikbayeva
- (Kazakhstan) Darya Shevchenko
- (Kazakhstan) Dariya Simonova
- (South Korea) Jiseon Baek
- (South Korea) Gim Yun-hee
- (South Korea) Hyejeang Ha
- (South Korea) Hyejin Kim
- (South Korea) Kyungeun Lee
- (South Korea) Unjin Sin
- (Poland) Inga Buczynska
- (Poland) Anna Gorna
- (Poland) Anna Semmerling
- (Poland) Aleksandra Szutenberg
- (Poland) Agata Tworek
- (Poland) Aleksandra Wojcik
- (Russia) Uliana Donskova
- (Russia) Daria Koroleva
- (Russia) Ekaterina Malygina
- (Russia) Anastasia Maximova
- (Russia) Natalia Pichuzhkina
- (Russia) Daria Shcherbakova
- (Switzerland) Chantal Breitinger
- (Switzerland) Capucine Jelmi
- (Switzerland) Carol Rohatsch
- (Switzerland) Nadine Stucki
- (Switzerland) Lisa Tacchelli
- (Switzerland) Souheila Yacoub
- (Ukraine) Olena Dmytrash
- (Ukraine) Viera Perederiy
- (Ukraine) Oksana Petulko
- (Ukraine) Valeria Shurkhal
- (Ukraine) Olga Tsogla
- (Ukraine) Vita Zubchenko
- (United States) Stephanie Flaksman
- (United States) Kristin Kaye
- (United States) Frohlich Megan
- (United States) Sofya Roytburg
- (United States) Marlee Shape
- (Uzbekistan) Lyubov Dropets
- (Uzbekistan) Veronika Esipova
- (Uzbekistan) Ekaterina Safronova
- (Uzbekistan) Inara Sattarova
- (Uzbekistan) Kamila Tukhtaeva

==== All-Around ====
Place	Nation	5	3 + 2	Total
1st place, gold medalist(s)	Italy	27.275	27.125	54.400
2nd place, silver medalist(s)	Belarus	27.700	26.500	54.200
3rd place, bronze medalist(s)	Russia	24.900	26.450	51.350
4	Azerbaijan	25.600	24.900	50.500
5	Israel	25.450	25.025	50.475
6	Spain	25.750	24.700	50.450
7	Bulgaria	25.350	24.800	50.150
8	Japan	24.475	25.625	50.100
9	France	24.300	24.250	48.550
10	Ukraine	24.550	23.750	48.300
11	Poland	24.550	22.975	47.525
12	Switzerland	23.925	22.775	46.700
13	Germany	23.500	23.100	46.600
14	Hungary	23.850	21.275	45.125
15	Canada	22.625	21.950	44.575
16	United States	22.025	22.300	44.325
17	Greece	20.500	23.100	43.600
18	Uzbekistan	22.025	20.975	43.000
19	Finland	20.800	21.350	42.150
20	South Korea	21.600	20.250	41.850
21	Brazil	21.625	20.050	41.675
22	Kazakhstan	21.700	19.950	41.650
23	Czech Republic	21.600	19.200	40.800
24	Austria	20.100	20.525	40.625

==== 5 Hoops Final ====
Place	Nation/Gymnasts	Dif.	Art.	Exe.	Pen.	Total
1st place, gold medalist(s)	Russia	9.300	9.400	9.000		27.700
2nd place, silver medalist(s)	Italy	9.175	9.250	8.850		27.275
3rd place, bronze medalist(s)	Belarus	9.125	9.300	8.800		27.225
4	Bulgaria	8.725	8.700	8.350		25.775
5	Israel	8.450	8.400	7.700	0.40	24.150
6	Spain	7.950	8.300	7.800	0.40	23.650
7	Azerbaijan	7.725	8.300	7.850	0.40	23.475
8	Ukraine	7.425	8.050	7.350	0.20	22.625

==== 3 Ribbons + 2 Ropes Final ====
Place	Nation/Gymnasts	Dif.	Art.	Exe.	Pen.	Total
1st place, gold medalist(s)	Italy	8.800	9.050	8.800		26.650
2nd place, silver medalist(s)	Belarus	8.750	9.000	8.850		26.600
3rd place, bronze medalist(s)	Russia	8.800	8.800	8.700		26.300
4	Japan	8.475	8.750	8.750		25.975
5	Bulgaria	8.425	8.950	8.250		25.625
6	Azerbaijan	8.175	8.600	8.450		25.225
7	Spain	8.125	8.550	8.200		24.875
8	Israel	7.775	8.300	7.950		24.025

== Medal table ==
Rank	Nation	Gold	Silver	Bronze	Total
1	Russia	7	3	2	12
2	Italy	2	1	0	3
3	Belarus	0	3	2	5
4	Ukraine	0	1	3	4
5	Azerbaijan	0	1	1	2
6	Bulgaria	0	0	1	1
Totals (6 entries)		9	9	9	27
