= Viktoriia Shynkarenko =

Ukrainian rhythmic gymnast (born 1995)

- Born: 6 December 1995 (age 30) Kyiv, Ukraine

Gymnastics career
- Discipline: Rhythmic gymnastics
- Country represented: Ukraine; (2008)
- Retired: 2014
Medal record
Representing Ukraine
Rhythmic Gymnastics
World Championships
Bronze medal – third place	2011 Montpellier	Team
Bronze medal – third place	2013 Kiev	10 Clubs
Junior European Championships
Bronze medal – third place	2010 Bremen	Rope
Gymnasiade
Silver medal – second place	2009 Doha	Team
Silver medal – second place	2009 Doha	Ball

Viktoriia Shynkarenko (Ukrainian: Вікторія Миколаївна Шинкаренко; born 6 December 1995) is a retired Ukrainian individual and group rhythmic gymnast.

== Career ==
She represented her nation at international competitions. She competed at world championships, including at the 2011 World Championships, where Team Ukraine won bronze. She also competed at the 2012 European Championships where she finished 19th in the individual all-around.
