= Arina Charopa =

Belarusian rhythmic gymnast

- Born: 18 October 1995 (age 31) Minsk, Belarus
- Height: 175 cm (5 ft 9 in)

Gymnastics career
- Discipline: Rhythmic gymnastics
- Country represented: Belarus
- Head coach: Irina Leparskaya
- Choreographer: Galina Ryzhaknova
- Retired: 2016
- World ranking: 24 (2015 Season); 17 (2014 Season); 25 (2013 Season); 30 (2012 Season)
Medal record
Rhythmic gymnastics
Representing Belarus
World Championships
Silver medal – second place	2014 Izmir	Team
Silver medal – second place	2015 Stuttgart	Team
European Championships
Bronze medal – third place	2013 Vienna	Team
Junior European Championships
Silver medal – second place	2010 Bremen	Team
Silver medal – second place	2010 Bremen	Rope
Silver medal – second place	2010 Bremen	Clubs
Grand Prix Final
Silver medal – second place	2012 Brno	All-around
Silver medal – second place	2012 Brno	Hoop
Youth Olympic Games
Silver medal – second place	2010 Singapore	All-around

Arina Charopa (Belarusian: Арына Шарапа; Russian: Арина Шарапа; born 18 October 1995) is a Belarusian retired individual rhythmic gymnast. She is the 2012 Grand Prix Final All-around silver medalist and 2010 Youth Olympic silver medalist.

== Gymnastics career ==
=== Junior ===
Charopa, as a junior, won the silver medal at the 2010 Youth Olympic Games in Singapore ahead of German gymnast Jana Berezko-Marggrander, she also won silver in ribbon and rope at the 2010 European Junior Championships.

=== Senior ===
Charopa debuted as a senior in 2011, the absence of most veteran rhythmic gymnasts competing in Grand Prix after the 2012 Summer Olympics she was able to compete at the 2012 Grand Prix Final in Brno where she won silver medal in all-around and hoop behind the reigning Olympic silver medalist Daria Dmitrieva. Charopa started the 2013 season competing at the Valentine World Cup; she finished 5th in all-around at the 2013 Moscow Grand Prix and in 2013 Baltic Hoop. She competed at the 2013 Lisboa World Cup and the 2013 Bucharest World Cup. Charopa competed in her first senior Europeans at the 2013 European Championships together with her teammates ( Katsiaryna Halkina and Melitina Staniouta) where Team Belarus won the bronze medal. She then competed at the 2013 World Games in Cali, Colombia. In 2013, Liubov Charkashyna began coaching Charopa.

In the 2014 Season, Charopa began competing at the 2014 LA Lights and won the all-around bronze medal behind Ganna Rizatdinova. She then competed at the 2014 Thiais Grand Prix and finished 9th in all-around. Charopa then competed at the 2014 Debrecen World Cup, finishing 7th in the all-around and winning bronze in ribbon. Charopa finished 7th in all-around at the 2014 Holon Grand Prix. In her second World Cup event, Charopa finished 7th in all-around at the 2014 Lisboa World Cup. She qualified to all 4 event finals and won silver in ribbon. On 3–5 May, Charopa then competed at the 2014 Kalamata Cup and finished 4th in all-around behind teammate Halkina. Charopa then competed at the 2014 Corbeil-Essonnes World Cup and finished 11th in all-around. On 5–7 September, Charopa competed in the Senor International tournament in Kazan, Russia, where she won the all-around silver behind Russia's Diana Ibragimova. On 22–28 September Charopa (along with teammates Melitina Staniouta and Katsiaryna Halkina) represented Belarus at the 2014 World Championships where they took the Team silver with a total of 136.073 points.

In the 2015 Season, Charopa suffered an injury at the start of the season. On 22–24 May, Charopa competed at the 2015 Tashkent World Cup, finishing 11th in the all-around. In August, Charopa competed at the MTK Budapest Cup, finishing 4th in the all-around behind Russian Arina Averina. In apparatus finals, Charopa won bronze in clubs and ribbon. On 9–13 September, Charopa (together with teammates Melitina Staniouta, Katsiaryna Halkina and Hanna Bazhko) competed at the 2015 World Championships in Stuttgart, with Team Belarus winning the silver. On 2–4 October Charopa, together with teammates Melitina Staniouta and junior Yulia Isachanka, represented Team Dinamo Minsk at the 2015 Aeon Cup in Tokyo Japan, Charopa finished 13th in the individual all-around finals and with team Belarus finishing 3rd in the overall standings.

Charopa completed her career at the end of the 2016 Season.

== Routine music information ==
Year	Apparatus	Music title
2015	Hoop	Rockin Gypsies by Willie & Lobo
2015	Ball	Per Te by Josh Groban
2015	Clubs	
2015	Ribbon	Danse macabre, Op.40 by Philharmonia Orchestra, Charles Dutoit
2014	Hoop	Zorba's Dance by David Garrett
2014	Ball	
2014	Clubs	
2014	Ribbon	Ich Schau In Die Blaue See by Marinechor Der Schwarzmeerflotte
2013	Hoop	
2013	Ball	
2013	Clubs	Perhaps, Perhaps, Perhaps by The Pussycat Dolls
2013	Ribbon	Moment Musicaux In E Minor Op.16 No.4 by Gabriela Montero
