= Ekaterina Malygina =

Russian rhythmic gymnast

- Full name: Ekaterina Olegovna Malygina
- Born: 30 November 1993 (age 32) Perm, Russia
- Height: 178 cm (5 ft 10 in)

Gymnastics career
- Discipline: Rhythmic gymnastics
- Country represented: Russia (2007-2010)
- Head coach: Irina Viner
- Assistant coach: V Ivanitskaya
- Former coaches: Anna Shumilova, Marina Munipova
- Retired: 2010
Medal record
Group rhythmic gymnastics
Representing Russia
World Championships
Bronze medal – third place	2009 Mie	Group All-around
Bronze medal – third place	2009 Mie	3 Ribbons/ 2 Ropes
Gold medal – first place	2009 Mie	5 Hoops
Bronze medal – third place	2010 Moscow	Group All-around
Gold medal – first place	2010 Moscow	5 Balls
Gold medal – first place	2010 Moscow	3 Ribbons/ 2 Ropes
European Championships
Gold medal – first place	2010 Bremen	Group All-around
Gold medal – first place	2010 Bremen	5 hoops
Gold medal – first place	2010 Bremen	3 Ribbons/ 2 Ropes

Ekaterina Makygina (born 30 November 1993) is a Russian rhythmic gymnast.

== Career ==
Since 2001 she was a pupil of SDYUSSHOR 1 in Perm, coached by Marina Munipova. In 3 1/2 years she became the leader of the Perm Region in her age category.

=== Junior ===
Since July 2006, she trained at the Olympic Reserve school in Dmitrov, Moscow Oblast. Since 2007, she has performed in individual exercises under the guidance of Anna Shumilova and was part of Russia's junior team.

In 2007 she won gold at championship of the Moscow region and the Central Federal District. Malygina was the bronze medalist in the ribbon final at the Russian Championship. She won All-Around bronze at the III Student Games as part of the team of the Central Federal District and at the "Hopes of Russia" tournament. Ekaterina also won medals in International competitions in Kyiv and Ljubljana.

Malygina retained her title of champion of the Central Federal District in 2008. She then won gold the Russian Championship, silver in the All-Around and the ball final, bronze in the rope final and in the team competition. She competed in international competitions and won medals in Germany, Romania, Israel, Italy. In the summer she was awarded the title of Master of Sports of International Class. In September 2008, after the team that competed at the Olympic Games in Beijing, Malygina was included in the Russian group.

=== Senior ===
As a member of the group Ekaterina won medals in World Cups and Grand Prixes. She then won All-Around and 3 ribbons + 2 ropes bronze at World Champion in Mie, Japan, becoming world champion in the 5 hoops final. For this Malygina was awarded the title of Honored Master of Sports of Russia.

In 2010, Ekaterina kept winning prizes at World Cup and Grand Prix's stage. At the European Championships in Bremen, Germany, the Russian group won gold in all the events. In September Malygina participated in the World Championships in Moscow, Russia, becoming bronze All-Around medallist and World Champion in both the 5 hoops and 3 ribbons + 2 balls finals.

At the end of 2010, Ekaterina Malygina decided to retire from the sport. She is now a coach at her own club.
