= Sun Arena =

Sporting arena in Ise, Mie, Japan

Coordinates: 34°29′22.4″N 136°46′8.28″E

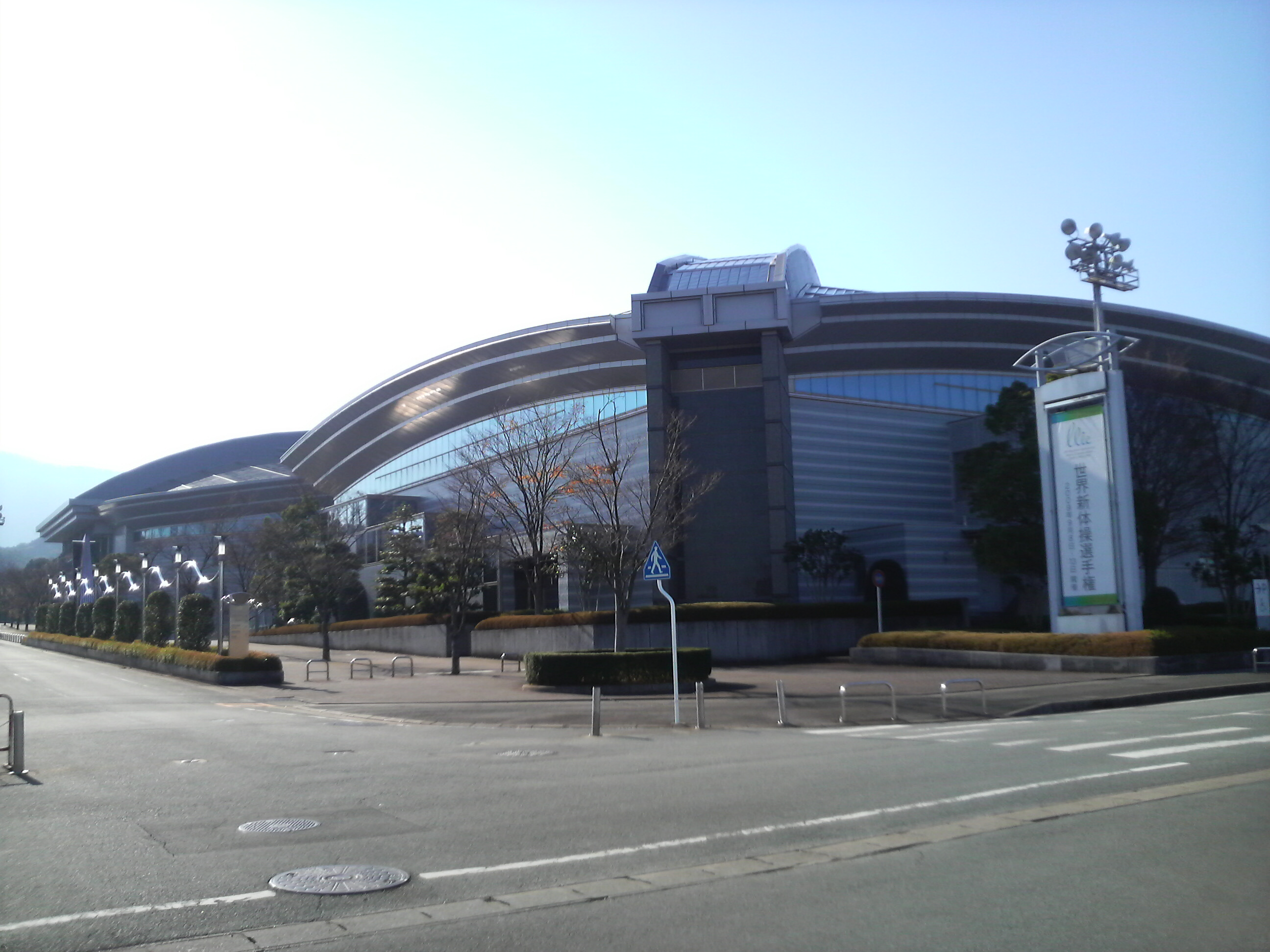
- Interactive map of Sun Arena
- Location: Asamacho Ise, Mie
- Owner: Mie Prefecture
- Operator: Scolture-Mie
- Capacity: 11,000

Construction
- Opened: 5 June 1994
- Cost: 16.2 billion yen

Tenant
- none

Sun Arena is an indoor sporting arena located in the city of Ise, Mie Prefecture, Japan. The capacity of the arena is 11,000. The arena was host to the 2009 World Rhythmic Gymnastics Championships.

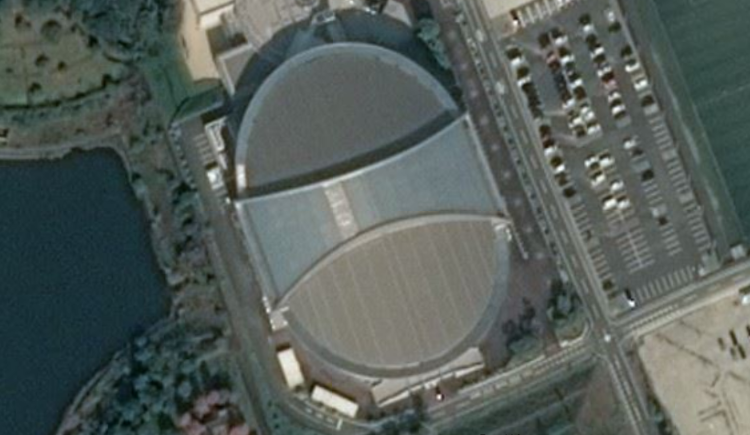
Satellite view
