= Pooja Surve =

Indian rhythmic gymnast

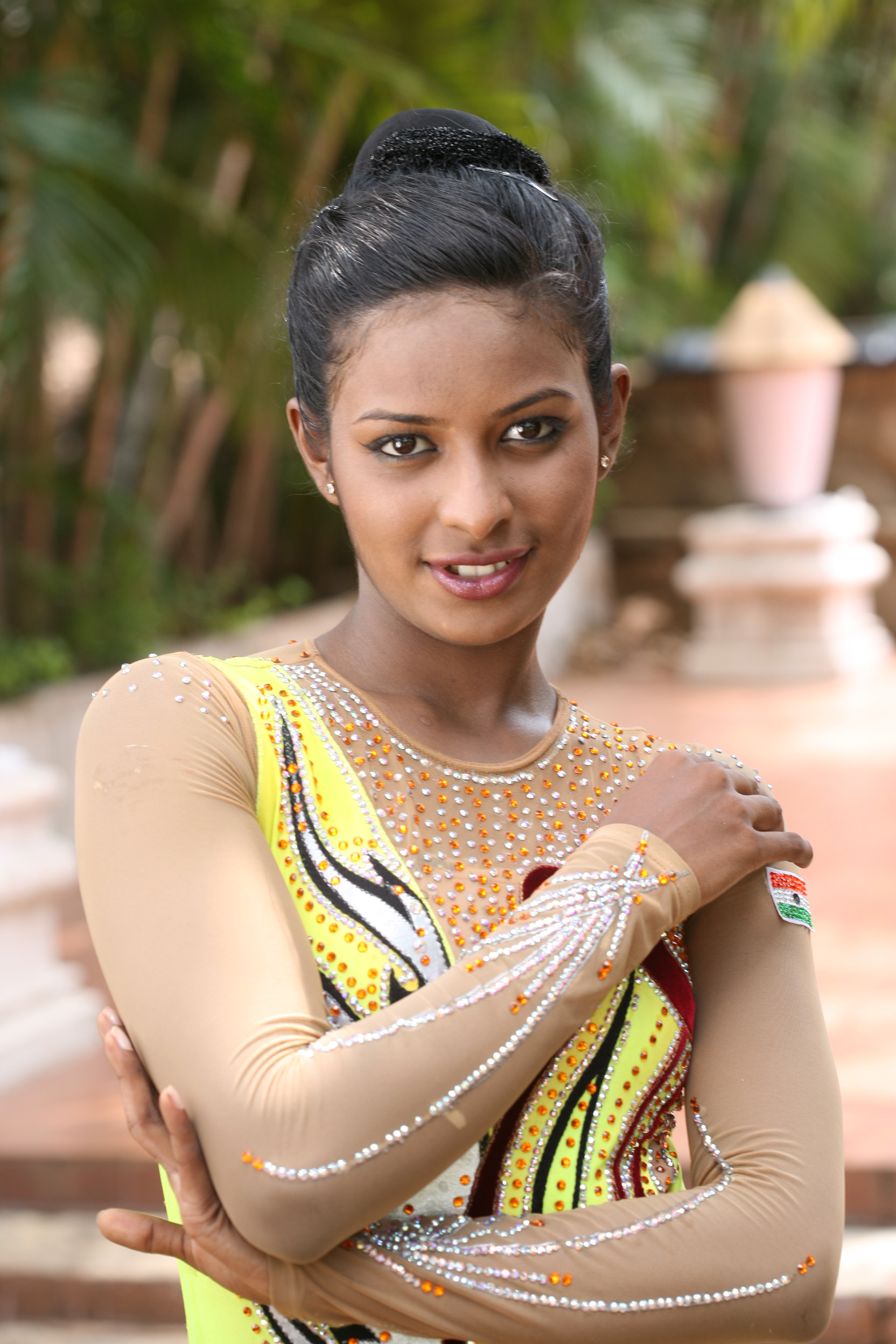
- Surve at the 2010 Commonwealth Games

Personal information
- Full name: Pooja Shriniwas Surve
- Nickname: Champion
- Born: 8 June 1990 (age 36)

Gymnastics career
- Discipline: Rhythmic gymnastics
- Country represented: India (2008–2010)

Pooja Surve is an Indian former rhythmic gymnast. She represented India at international competitions and competed at two World championships, the 2009 World Rhythmic Gymnastics Championships in Japan and the 2010 World Rhythmic Gymnastics Championships in Moscow. In 2010, she was the only rhythmic gymnast from India to qualify for the individual final at the 2010 Commonwealth Games. She is also a recipient of the Shree Shiv Chhatrapati Award from the government of Maharashtra.

After her competitive career, she became a gymnastics coach and judge. In 2016 she was selected as the technical head by Star-sports for the Rio Olympics and did the commentary for all artistic, rhythmic and trampoline gymnastics.

Besides being a gymnast, Surve is a classical Kathak and ballet dancer. She has also been on reality shows; she appeared on the third season of India's Got Talent.

== Early life and education ==
Surve was born in Mumbai on 8 June 1990. She has a sister, Mansi Surve, who is the head coach at her gymnastics academy and is also an international judge.

In 1996, at the age of six, she began learning artistic gymnastics; she later switched to rhythmic gymnastics. Her parents originally enrolled her in gymnastics to strengthen her body after childhood illness.

Later, her mother also enrolled her in classical dance classes. She learnt Kathak under the guidance of Shrimati Radhika Phanse.

Surve enrolled in the D. G. Ruparel College of Arts, Science and Commerce and graduated with a degree in computer science.

== Gymnastics career ==
In 2007, Surve was injured at the National Games; she tore a ligament while performing a pivot element. She required surgery and missed half a year of training.

In 2009, Surve competed at her first World Championships in Mie, Japan as part of the first team of Indian gymnasts to compete at a Rhythmic Gymnastics World Championships. Due to the poor funding of the sport in India, the team's equipment did not meet international standards, and Surve and her teammates bought a set of equipment at the venue to share. Surve placed the highest among her teammates.

In 2010, Surve and several teammates spent a month at a training camp in Moscow ahead of the 2010 World Championships, where she again represented India. The next month, she competed at the 2010 Commonwealth Games in Delhi, India, where she placed 16th in the all-around final.

== Coaching career ==
Surve became a coach in 2012. She is the director of a gymnastics academy in Thane and has spoken about the difficulties of obtaining funding and improving training conditions for gymnasts.

In 2020, she worked with the Sports Authority of India as the director of an online coaching program for rhythmic gymnastics.
