= Elisa Santoni =

Italian rhythmic gymnast (born 1987)

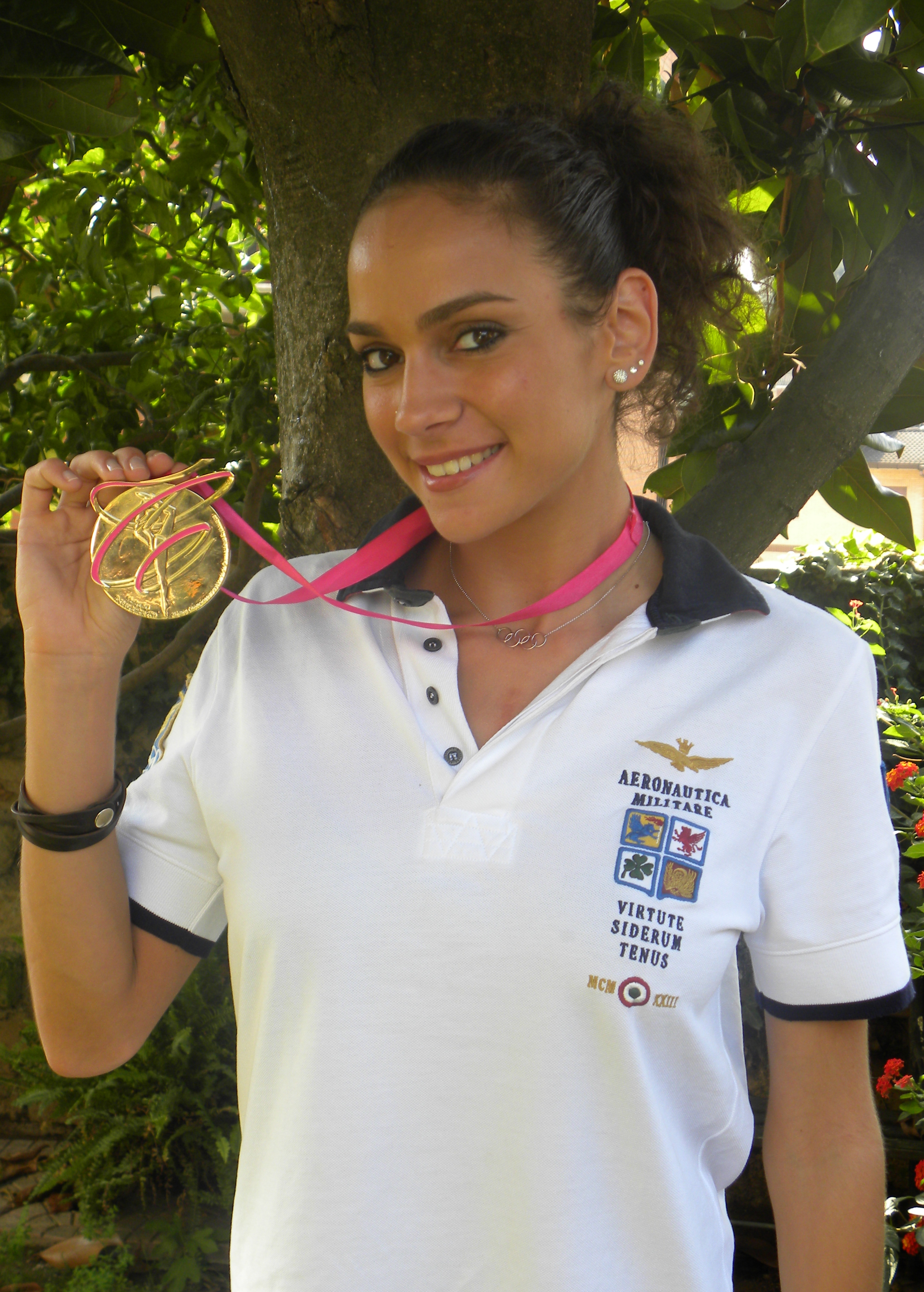

Personal information
- Born: December 10, 1987 (age 38) Rome, Italy
- Height: 1.76 m (5 ft 9 in)

Gymnastics career
- Discipline: Rhythmic gymnastics
- Country represented: Italy
- Club: C.S. Aeronautica Militare
- Head coach: Emanuela Maccarani
- Retired: 2012
Medal record
Olympic Games
Silver medal – second place	2004 Athens	Group All-around
Bronze medal – third place	2012 London	Group All-around
World Championships
Gold medal – first place	2011 Montpellier	Group All-around
Gold medal – first place	2010 Moscow	Group All-around
Gold medal – first place	2009 Mie	Group All-around
Gold medal – first place	2009 Mie	3 Ribbons / 2 Ropes
Gold medal – first place	2005 Baku	3 Hoops / 4 Clubs
Silver medal – second place	2011 Montpellier	5 Balls
Silver medal – second place	2011 Montpellier	3 Ribbons / 2 Hoops
Silver medal – second place	2010 Moscow	5 Hoops
Silver medal – second place	2010 Moscow	3 Ribbons / 2 Ropes
Silver medal – second place	2009 Mie	5 Hoops
Silver medal – second place	2007 Patras	Group All-around
Silver medal – second place	2007 Patras	5 Ropes
Silver medal – second place	2007 Patras	3 Hoops / 4 Clubs
Silver medal – second place	2005 Baku	Group All-around
Silver medal – second place	2005 Baku	5 Ribbons
Bronze medal – third place	2003 Budapest	5 Ribbons
Bronze medal – third place	2003 Budapest	3 Hoops / 2 Balls
European Championships
Gold medal – first place	2008 Torino	5 Ropes
Silver medal – second place	2010 Bremen	Group All-around
Silver medal – second place	2010 Bremen	3 Ribbons / 2 Ropes
Silver medal – second place	2008 Torino	3 Hoops / 4 Clubs
Silver medal – second place	2006 Moscow	Group All-around
Silver medal – second place	2006 Moscow	3 Hoops / 4 Clubs
Bronze medal – third place	2012 Nizhny	Group All-around
Bronze medal – third place	2012 Nizhny	3 Ribbons / 2 Hoops
Bronze medal – third place	2010 Bremen	5 Hoops
Bronze medal – third place	2008 Torino	Group All-around
Bronze medal – third place	2006 Moscow	5 Ribbons
Bronze medal – third place	2003 Riesa	Group All-around
Bronze medal – third place	2003 Riesa	3 Hoops / 2 Balls

Elisa Santoni (born 10 December 1987) is an Italian rhythmic gymnast.

== Biography ==
Elisa joined Italian national team in 2003. At the 2003 European Championships in Riesa, Germany, she took bronze medal in group all-around and 3 hoops + 2 balls alongside Elisa Blanchi, Daniela Masseroni, Pamela Mastroianni, Francesca Pasinetti and Francesca Chugurra. In September, at the 2003 World Championships in Budapest, Hungary, they took 4th place in group all-around, tied with Belarus, who won bronze because of better execution. Then they won bronze medals in both apparatus finals.

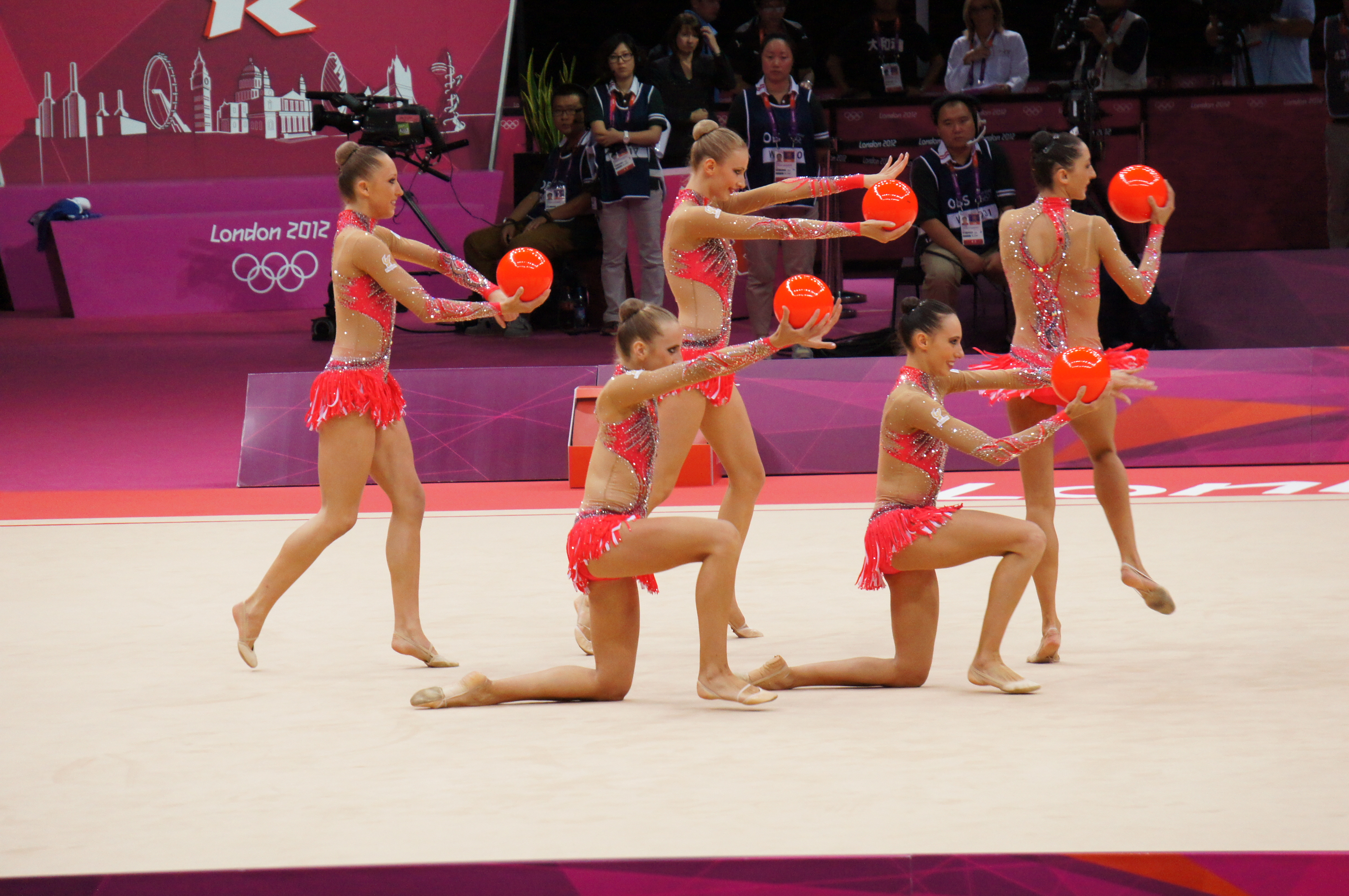
Italian Group in 5 Balls at the 2012 Summer Olympics

One of the veterans of the Italian group, she has competed in 3 Olympic Games, a member of silver medalist group at the 2004 Summer Olympics in Athens and the bronze medal winning group at the 2012 Summer Olympics in London. She also competed in the Italian Group competed at the 2008 Summer Olympics in Beijing which finishing 4th in the Group All-around. She was part of the 2010 and 2011 Italian Group that competed at the World Championships that won the Group All-around gold medal. Her teammates also won a pair of bronze medals at the 2012 World Cup Final in 5 Balls and 3 Ribbons + 2 Hoops.

Her teammates have included Romina Laurito, Marta Pagnini, Elisa Blanchi, Anzhelika Savrayuk, Andreea Stefanescu.

== Achievements ==
- Participated in three consecutive editions of the Olympic Games (Rio 2016, Tokyo 2021, Paris 2024). Record shared with Alessia Maurelli, Elisa Blanchi and Alessia Maurelli.

== Detailed Olympic results ==
Year	Competition Description	Location	Music	Apparatus	Rank	Score-Final	Rank	Score-Qualifying
2012	Olympics	London		All-around	3rd	55.450	2nd	55.800
2012	Olympics	London	Black Gold by Armand Amar	5 Balls	2nd	28.125	2nd	28.100
2012	Olympics	London	William Tell Overture by Gioachino Rossini	3 Ribbons + 2 Hoops	4th	27.325	2nd	27.700
