= Natalia Pichuzhkina =

Russian rhythmic gymnast

- Full name: Natalia Nikolaevna Pichuzhkina
- Nickname: Natasha
- Born: 3 June 1991 (age 35) Zavolzhye, Nizhny Novgorod Oblast, Russia

Gymnastics career
- Discipline: Rhythmic gymnastics
- Country represented: Russia (2006 - 2012)
- Gym: Novogorsk
- Head coach: Irina Viner
- Retired: 2012
Medal record
Group rhythmic gymnastics
Representing Russia
World Championships
Gold medal – first place	2011 Montpellier	5 Balls
Gold medal – first place	2010 Moscow	5 Hoops
Gold medal – first place	2010 Moscow	3 Ribbons + 2 Ropes
Gold medal – first place	2009 Mie	5 Hoops
Silver medal – second place	2011 Montpellier	Group All-around
Bronze medal – third place	2010 Moscow	Group All-around
Bronze medal – third place	2009 Mie	Group All-around
Bronze medal – third place	2009 Mie	3 Ribbons + 2 Ropes
European Championships
Gold medal – first place	2010 Bremen	Group All-around
Gold medal – first place	2010 Bremen	5 Hoops
Gold medal – first place	2010 Bremen	3 Ribbons/ 2 Ropes
Junior European Championships
Gold medal – first place	2006 Moscow	Team
Gold medal – first place	2006 Moscow	Clubs

Natalia Nikolaevna Pichuzhkina (Russian: Наталья Николаевна Пичужкина; born 3 June 1991 in Zavolzhye, Nizhny Novgorod Oblast) is a Russian group rhythmic gymnast.

== Career ==
Pichuzkina debuted in international junior scene in 2004 and competed in international competitions along with teammate Evgenia Kanaeva. She won gold medals in team and clubs at the 2006 European Junior Championships.

In 2009, Pichuzkina switched to group rhythmic gymnastics. She competed in her first Worlds at the 2009 World Championships in Mie, Japan where the Russian group won bronze in group all-around and 3 Ribbons + 2 Ropes, they won gold in 5 hoops. The following year they swept the gold medals at the 2010 European Championships in group all-around, 5 hoops, 3 ribbons/ 2 ropes. They repeated as bronze medalists in group all-around at the 2010 World Championships in Moscow, however they won gold in the 5 hoops, 3 ribbons/ 2 ropes finals.

At the 2011 World Rhythmic Gymnastics Championships, Pichuzkina together with the Russian group won the gold medal in 5 balls event and a silver medal in the group all-around event. In 2012, she suffered a leg injury and was replaced by Russian Group reserve member Karolina Sevastyanova to compete at the 2012 European Championships.

== Personal life ==
Pichuzkina graduated from the Faculty of Physical Education and Sports of Lobachevsky State University of Nizhni Novgorod in 2013.
