= 2009 FIG Rhythmic Gymnastics World Cup series =

The 2009 FIG World Cup circuit in Rhythmic Gymnastics includes six category A events and two category B events. With stopovers in Europe only, the competitions took place on March 6–8 in Budapest (HUN), April 4–5 in Saint Petersburg (RUS), April 16–19 in Portimão (POR), April 25–26 in Maribor (SLO), April 30 – May 2 in Pesaro (ITA), May 8–10 in Corbeil-Essonnes (FRA), August 15–17 in Kyiv (UKR) and August 21–23 in Minsk (BLR). Two events were open only to individual athletes (Maribor and Corbeil-Essonnes), while six were open to both individual athletes and groups. In all of the events, all-around competitions served as qualifications for the finals by apparatus. The world ranking points collected by the competitors at their best four World Cup events added up to a total, and the top scorers in each event were crowned winners of the overall series at the final event in Minsk, Belarus.

== Formats ==
Date	Level	Location	Type	Ref.
March 6–8	Cat. A	(Hungary) Budapest	Individuals and groups	
April 4–5	Cat. B	(Russia) Saint Petersburg	Individuals and groups	
April 16–19	Cat. A	(Portugal) Portimão	Individuals and groups	
April 25–26	Cat. B	(Slovenia) Maribor	Individuals	
April 30 – May 2	Cat. A	(Italy) Pesaro	Individuals and groups	
May 8–10	Cat. A	(France) Corbeil-Essonnes	Individuals	
August 15–17	Cat. A	(Ukraine) Kyiv	Individuals and groups	
August 21–23	Cat. A	(Belarus) Minsk	Individuals and groups	

== Medal winners ==
=== All-around ===
==== Individual ====
Competitions	Gold	Silver	Bronze
Category A
Budapest	(Russia) Yevgeniya Kanayeva	(Russia) Vera Sessina	(Russia) Olga Kapranova
Portimão	(Russia) Yevgeniya Kanayeva	(Russia) Vera Sessina	(Ukraine) Anna Bessonova
Pesaro	(Russia) Yevgeniya Kanayeva	(Russia) Vera Sessina	(Ukraine) Anna Bessonova
Corbeil-Essonnes	(Russia) Yana Lukonina	(Russia) Marina Shpekht	(Russia) Daria Dmitrieva
Kyiv	(Ukraine) Anna Bessonova	(Russia) Olga Kapranova	(Bulgaria) Silvia Miteva
Minsk	(Russia) Yevgeniya Kanayeva	(Russia) Daria Kondakova	(Belarus) Melitina Staniouta
Category B
Saint Petersburg	(Russia) Yevgeniya Kanayeva	(Russia) Vera Sessina	(Russia) Marina Shpekht
Maribor	(Russia) Olga Kapranova	(Belarus) Melitina Staniouta	(Belarus) Liubov Charkashyna

==== Group all-around ====
Competitions	Gold	Silver	Bronze
Category A
Budapest	Belarus	Russia	Bulgaria
Portimão	Belarus	Spain	Russia
Pesaro	Italy	Belarus	Bulgaria
Kyiv	Belarus	Azerbaijan	Ukraine
Minsk	Belarus	Italy	Russia
Category B
Saint Petersburg	Russia	Belarus	Italy

=== Apparatus ===
==== Rope ====
Competitions	Gold	Silver	Bronze
Category A
Budapest	(Russia) Yevgeniya Kanayeva	(Russia) Vera Sessina	(Kazakhstan) Aliya Yussupova
Portimão	(Russia) Yevgeniya Kanayeva	(Ukraine) Anna Bessonova	(Azerbaijan) Aliya Garayeva
Pesaro	(Russia) Yevgeniya Kanayeva	(Russia) Vera Sessina	(Belarus) Melitina Staniouta
Corbeil-Essonnes	(Russia) Daria Dmitrieva	(Russia) Marina Shpekht	(France) Delphine Ledoux
Kyiv	(Ukraine) Anna Bessonova	(Ukraine) Alina Maksymenko	(Russia) Olga Kapranova
Minsk	(Russia) Yevgeniya Kanayeva	(Belarus) Melitina Staniouta	(Russia) Daria Kondakova
Category B
Saint Petersburg	(Russia) Yevgeniya Kanayeva	(Russia) Vera Sessina	(Belarus) Melitina Staniouta
Maribor	(Russia) Olga Kapranova	(Russia) Marina Shpekht	(Belarus) Melitina Staniouta

==== Hoop ====
Competitions	Gold	Silver	Bronze
Category A
Budapest	(Russia) Yevgeniya Kanayeva	(Kazakhstan) Aliya Yussupova	(Russia) Vera Sessina
Portimão	(Ukraine) Anna Bessonova	(Russia) Yevgeniya Kanayeva	(Belarus) Liubov Charkashyna
Pesaro	(Russia) Yevgeniya Kanayeva	(Ukraine) Anna Bessonova	(Russia) Vera Sessina
Corbeil-Essonnes	(Russia) Marina Shpekht	(Russia) Yana Lukonina	(Kazakhstan) Anna Alyabyeva
Kyiv	(Ukraine) Anna Bessonova	(Russia) Olga Kapranova	(Bulgaria) Silvia Miteva
Minsk	(Russia) Yevgeniya Kanayeva	(Russia) Olga Kapranova	(Belarus) Melitina Staniouta
Category B
Saint Petersburg	(Russia) Yevgeniya Kanayeva	(Russia) Vera Sessina	(Belarus) Liubov Charkashyna
Maribor	(Belarus) Liubov Charkashyna	(Russia) Yana Lukonina	(Belarus) Melitina Staniouta

==== Ball ====
Competitions	Gold	Silver	Bronze
Category A
Budapest	(Russia) Yevgeniya Kanayeva	(Russia) Olga Kapranova	(Kazakhstan) Aliya Yussupova
Portimão	(Russia) Yevgeniya Kanayeva	(Russia) Vera Sessina	(Ukraine) Anna Bessonova
Pesaro	(Russia) Yevgeniya Kanayeva	(Ukraine) Anna Bessonova	(Kazakhstan) Aliya Yussupova
Corbeil-Essonnes	(Russia) Daria Dmitrieva	(Bulgaria) Bilyana Prodanova	(Spain) Carolina Rodriguez
Kyiv	(Ukraine) Anna Bessonova	(Bulgaria) Silvia Miteva	(Ukraine) Alina Maksymenko
Minsk	(Russia) Yevgeniya Kanayeva	(Russia) Daria Kondakova	(Belarus) Melitina Staniouta
Category B
Saint Petersburg	(Russia) Yevgeniya Kanayeva	(Russia) Olga Kapranova	(Belarus) Liubov Charkashyna
Maribor	(Russia) Olga Kapranova	(Belarus) Liubov Charkashyna	(Belarus) Melitina Staniouta

==== Ribbon ====
Competitions	Gold	Silver	Bronze
Category A
Budapest	(Russia) Vera Sessina	(Russia) Yevgeniya Kanayeva	(Belarus) Liubov Charkashyna
Portimão	(Russia) Yevgeniya Kanayeva	(Russia) Vera Sessina	(Belarus) Melitina Staniouta
Pesaro	(Russia) Vera Sessina	(Russia) Yevgeniya Kanayeva	(Ukraine) Anna Bessonova
Corbeil-Essonnes	(Russia) Daria Dmitrieva	(Bulgaria) Bilyana Prodanova	(France) Delphine Ledoux
Kyiv	(Ukraine) Anna Bessonova	(Israel) Irina Risenzon	(Kazakhstan) Aliya Yussupova
Minsk	(Russia) Yevgeniya Kanayeva	(Russia) Daria Kondakova	(Belarus) Melitina Staniouta
Category B
Saint Petersburg	(Russia) Vera Sessina	(Russia) Yevgeniya Kanayeva	(Belarus) Melitina Staniouta
Maribor	(Russia) Olga Kapranova	(Belarus) Melitina Staniouta	(Russia) Marina Shpekht

==== 5 hoops ====
Competitions	Gold	Silver	Bronze
Category A
Budapest	Belarus	Bulgaria	Russia
Portimão	Belarus	Bulgaria	Russia
Pesaro	Italy	Belarus	Bulgaria
Kyiv	Belarus	Bulgaria	Azerbaijan
Minsk	Russia	Italy	Belarus
Category B
Saint Petersburg	Belarus	Italy	Russia

==== 2 ropes and 3 ribbons ====
Competitions	Gold	Silver	Bronze
Category A
Budapest	Bulgaria	China	Belarus
Portimão	Japan	Spain	Russia
Pesaro	Italy	Bulgaria	Belarus
Kyiv	Belarus	Ukraine	Azerbaijan
Minsk	Russia	Belarus	Italy
Category B
Saint Petersburg	Belarus	Italy	Russia

== Overall medal table ==
Rank	Nation	Gold	Silver	Bronze	Total
1	Russia (RUS)	36	28	15	79
2	Belarus (BLR)	11	8	19	38
3	Ukraine (UKR)	6	5	6	17
4	Italy (ITA)	3	4	2	9
5	Bulgaria (BUL)	1	7	5	13
6	Japan (JPN)	1	0	0	1
7	Spain (ESP)	0	2	1	3
8	Kazakhstan (KAZ)	0	1	5	6
9	Azerbaijan (AZE)	0	1	3	4
10	China (CHN)	0	1	0	1
10	Israel (ISR)	0	1	0	1
12	France (FRA)	0	0	2	2
Totals (12 entries)		58	58	58	174

== See also ==
- 2009 FIG Artistic Gymnastics World Cup series
- 2009 Rhythmic Gymnastics Grand Prix circuit
