= Zeynab Javadli =

Azerbaijani rhythmic gymnast

- Born: 19 July 1991 (age 35) Baku, Azerbaijan
- Spouse: Saeed bin Maktoum bin Rashid Al Maktoum (m. 2015; div. 2019)

Gymnastics career
- Discipline: Rhythmic gymnastics
Medal record
World Championships
Bronze medal – third place	2007 Patras	Team
Bronze medal – third place	2009 Mie	Team
European Championships
Silver medal – second place	2009 Baku	Team
Bronze medal – third place	2007 Baku	Team

Zeynab Javadli (Azerbaijani: Zeynəb Cavadlı; born 19 July 1991) is an Azerbaijani former rhythmic gymnast. She is a two-time World Championship team bronze medalist and a European Championship team silver medalist.

== Career ==
Javadli was born in Baku. She represented Azerbaijan in rhythmic gymnastics and competed in individual and team events. At the 2007 World Rhythmic Gymnastics Championships in Patras, she was part of the Azerbaijani team that won the bronze medal in the team competition.

At the 2009 World Rhythmic Gymnastics Championships in Mie, Japan, Javadli again won team bronze with Azerbaijan. She also placed 29th in the individual all-around qualification, with apparatus qualification placements of 30th in rope, 28th in hoop, 60th in ball and 25th in ribbon. At the 2009 Rhythmic Gymnastics European Championships in Baku, she was a member of the Azerbaijani team that won the silver medal.

In 2011, Javadli won bronze medals in ball and clubs at the Baltic Hoop tournament in Riga, and placed fourth in the all-around. She was also named "Miss Elegance" and "Miss Sympathy" at the tournament. At the 2011 World Rhythmic Gymnastics Championships in Montpellier, she finished 29th in the individual all-around qualification and was part of the Azerbaijani team that placed fourth.

== Personal life ==
Javadli married Sheikh Saeed bin Maktoum bin Rashid Al Maktoum, a nephew of Dubai ruler Mohammed bin Rashid Al Maktoum, in 2015. The couple divorced in 2019. In October 2022, Javadli appealed to the United Nations Human Rights Council regarding the custody dispute.

In June 2026, Dubai Public Prosecution stated that Javadli had been taken into custody following a complaint filed by Sheikh Saeed in connection with the ongoing custody proceedings. According to Sheikh Saeed's lawyer, custody of the children had been awarded to him in 2022 and the decision was subsequently upheld by a higher court in Dubai. On 7 June 2026, Dubai Public Prosecution stated that Javadli had been released on bail following questioning in connection with the investigation.
