= Irina Risenzon =

Israeli rhythmic gymnast

- אירה ריסנזון
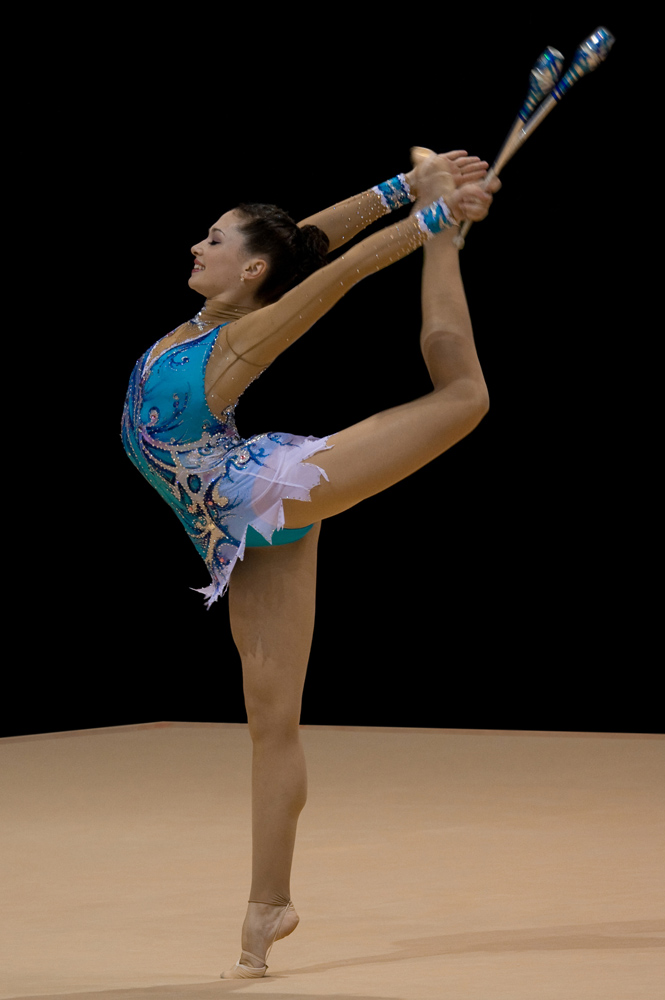
- Risenzon at the World Final Cup, Benidorm, 2008

Personal information
- Full name: Irina Risenzon-Nahmany
- Nickname: Ira
- Born: 14 January 1988 (age 38) Budapest, Hungary
- Height: 1.70 m (5 ft 7 in)
- Spouse: Dave Nahmany

Gymnastics career
- Discipline: Rhythmic gymnastics
- Country represented: Israel
- Head coach: Irina "Ira" Vigdorchik
- Assistant coach: Fira Voronov
- Choreographer: Ayelet Zussman
- Retired: 2010
Medal record
Representing Israel
Rhythmic Gymnastics
Grand Prix Final
Bronze medal – third place	2007 Innsbruck	Hoop
Bronze medal – third place	2007 Innsbruck	Rope
Bronze medal – third place	2008 Bratislava	All-around
Bronze medal – third place	2008 Bratislava	Rope
Bronze medal – third place	2008 Bratislava	Clubs
Bronze medal – third place	2008 Bratislava	Ribbon
Bronze medal – third place	2009 Berlin	Ball
Bronze medal – third place	2009 Berlin	Hoop
Universiade
Silver medal – second place	2009 Belgrade	Hoop

Irina "Ira" Risenzon-Nahmany (née Risenzon, Hebrew: אירה ריסנזון; born 14 January 1988) is a Hungarian-born Israeli retired rhythmic gymnast. She is the 2008 Grand Prix Final all-around bronze medalist.

== Early and personal life ==
Irina Risenzon was born in Hungary, then her parents along with her older brother Yuri moved to Ukraine, and then they immigrated to Israel when she was 9 years old. They resided in Hadera, Israel.

In 2011 she went through a conversion to Judaism.

She married Dave Nahmany on 18 July 2011, and they have 2 daughters, and reside in Hod HaSharon, Israel.

== Career ==
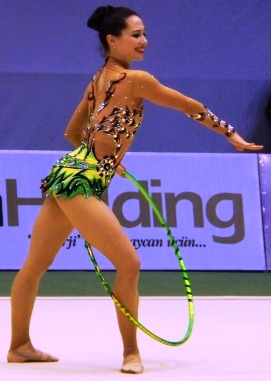
Irina Risenzon in 2009

Risenzon was coached by Ira Vigdorchik of Maccabi Holon.

Risenzon had her highest placement at the 2009 World Championships held in Mie, Japan finishing 6th in All-around and at the 2008 European Championships in Turin, Italy finishing 8th in All-around. She competed on behalf of Israel at the 2008 Summer Olympics in Beijing, China, placing 9th in the individual all-around competition. She won the All-around bronze medal at the 2008 Grand Prix Final in Bratislava, Slovakia.

In 2009, Risenzon won silver medals in the individual hoop event at the Summer Universiade. She has also won a pair of bronze medals at the individual apparatus events in ribbon, rope, ball, hoop and clubs at the FIG World Cup and Grand Prix Series.

Risenzon ended her career in 2010.

== Achievements ==
- first Israeli to advance to the Olympics Final finishing 9th in All-around
- first Israeli to medal at the Grand Prix Final

== Detailed Olympic results ==
Year	Competition Description	Location	Music	Apparatus	Rank	Score-Final	Rank	Score-Qualifying
2008	Olympics	Beijing		All-around	9th	66.775	8th	67.850
2008	Olympics	Beijing	Besame Mucho	Ribbon	9th	16.550	9th	16.825
2008	Olympics	Beijing	Gabbar/Suleiman music from Vicious Delicious by Said Mrad/Infected Mushroom	Rope	9th	16.350	9th	16.800
2008	Olympics	Beijing	Prison Break by Ramin Djawadi	Hoop	8th	17.025	8th	17.100
2008	Olympics	Beijing	Aa Tayar Hoja by Alka Yagnik	Clubs	9th	16.850	8th	17.125

== See also ==
- Sports in Israel
