= Anzhelika Savrayuk =

Italian rhythmic gymnast (born 1989)

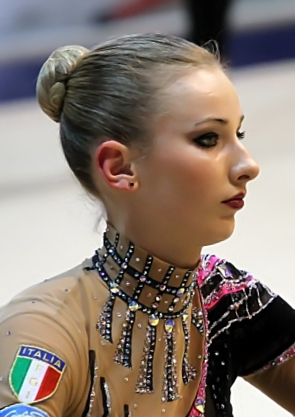
- Anzhelika Savrayuk, in 2012

Personal information
- Born: 23 August 1989 (age 37) Lutsk, Ukrainian SSR, Soviet Union

Gymnastics career
- Discipline: Rhythmic gymnastics
- Country represented: Italy
Medal record
Representing Italy
Olympic Games
Bronze medal – third place	2012 London	Group All-around
World Championships
Gold medal – first place	2009 Mie	Group All-around
Gold medal – first place	2009 Mie	3 Ribbons/ 2 Ropes
Gold medal – first place	2010 Moscow	Group All-around
Gold medal – first place	2011 Montpellier	Group All-around
Silver medal – second place	2009 Mie	5 Hoops
Silver medal – second place	2010 Moscow	5 Hoops
Silver medal – second place	2010 Moscow	3 Ribbons/ 2 Ropes
Silver medal – second place	2011 Montpellier	5 Balls
Silver medal – second place	2011 Montpellier	3 Ribbons/ 2 Hoops
European Championships
Gold medal – first place	2008 Torino	5 Ropes
Silver medal – second place	2008 Torino	3 Hoops / 4 Clubs
Silver medal – second place	2010 Bremen	Group All-around
Silver medal – second place	2010 Bremen	3 Ribbons/ 2 Ropes
Bronze medal – third place	2010 Bremen	5 Hoops
Bronze medal – third place	2012 Nizhny Novgorod	Group All-around
Bronze medal – third place	2012 Nizhny Novgorod	3 Ribbons/ 2 Hoops
Bronze medal – third place	2008 Torino	Group All-around

Anzhelika Savrayuk (Ukrainian: Анжеліка Савраюк; born 23 August 1989 in Lutsk, Ukrainian SSR, Soviet Union) is a Ukrainian-born Italian rhythmic gymnast.

== Career ==
Savrayuk has competed in two Olympic Games. She and the Italian group competed at the 2008 Summer Olympics in Beijing and finished 4th in the group all-around. She was part of the 2010 and 2011 Italian group that competed at the World Championships that won the Group all-around gold medal. Her teammates also won a pair of bronze medals at the 2012 World Cup Final in 5 Balls and 3 Ribbons + 2 Hoops. Savrayuk won a bronze medal at the 2012 Summer Olympics in the group all-around event together with other group members Romina Laurito, Marta Pagnini, Elisa Blanchi, Andreea Stefanescu, Elisa Santoni.

== Detailed Olympic results ==
Year	Competition Description	Location	Music	Apparatus	Rank	Score-Final	Rank	Score-Qualifying
2012	Olympics	London		All-around	3rd	55.450	2nd	55.800
2012	Olympics	London	Black Gold by Armand Amar	5 Balls	2nd	28.125	2nd	28.100
2012	Olympics	London	William Tell Overture by Gioachino Rossini	3 Ribbons + 2 Hoops	4th	27.325	2nd	27.700
