= Romina Laurito =

Italian rhythmic gymnast (born 1987)

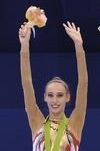

Personal information
- Born: 4 May 1987 (age 39)

Gymnastics career
- Discipline: Rhythmic gymnastics
- Country represented: Italy; (2001–2012)
Medal record
Representing Italy
Olympic Games
| Bronze medal – third place | 2012 London | Group All-around |
World Championships
| Gold medal – first place | 2009 Mie | Group All-around |
| Gold medal – first place | 2009 Mie | 3 Ribbons/ 2 Ropes |
| Gold medal – first place | 2010 Moscow | Group All-around |
| Gold medal – first place | 2011 Montpellier | Group All-around |
| Silver medal – second place | 2009 Mie | 5 Hoops |
| Silver medal – second place | 2010 Moscow | 5 Hoops |
| Silver medal – second place | 2010 Moscow | 3 Ribbons/ 2 Ropes |
| Silver medal – second place | 2011 Montpellier | 5 Balls |
| Silver medal – second place | 2011 Montpellier | 3 Ribbons/ 2 Hoops |
European Championships
| Silver medal – second place | 2010 Bremen | Group All-around |
| Silver medal – second place | 2010 Bremen | 3 Ribbons/ 2 Ropes |
| Bronze medal – third place | 2010 Bremen | 5 Hoops |
| Bronze medal – third place | 2012 Nizhny Novgorod | Group All-around |
| Bronze medal – third place | 2012 Nizhny Novgorod | 3 Ribbons/ 2 Hoops |
World Cup Final
| Bronze medal – third place | 2012 Minsk | 5 Balls |
| Bronze medal – third place | 2012 Minsk | 3 Ribbons/ 2 Hoops |

Romina Laurito (born 4 May 1987 in Gallarate) is an Italian rhythmic gymnast.

== Career ==
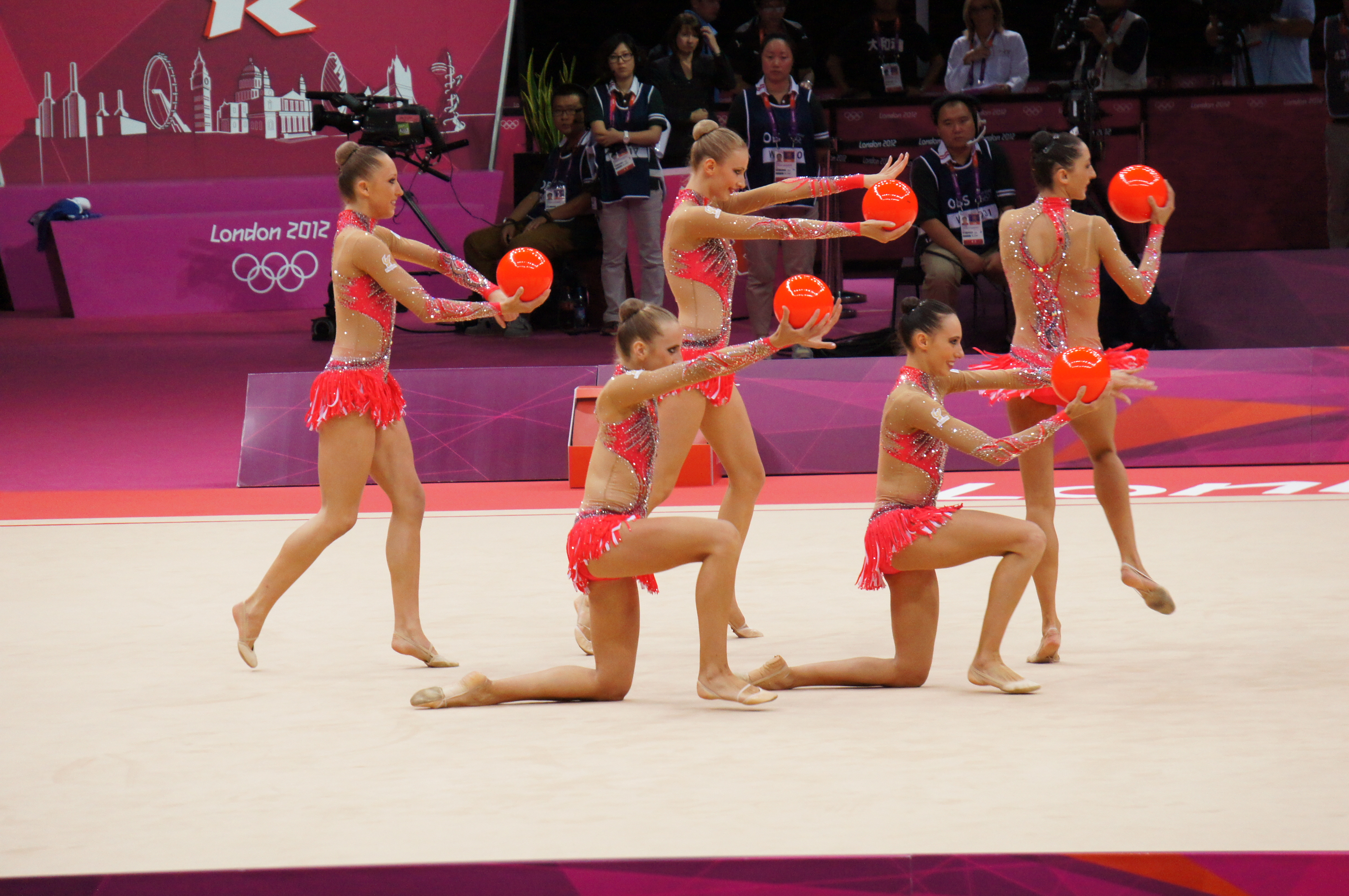
Italian Group in 5 Balls at the 2012 Summer Olympics

Laurito was a member of the Italian national team from 2001 to 2012. She was an individual gymnast until 2007. She was part of the 2010 and 2011 Italian Group that competed at the World Championships that won the Group All-around gold medal. Her teammates also won a pair of bronze medals at the 2012 World Cup Final in 5 Balls and 3 Ribbons + 2 Hoops. She has won a bronze medal at the 2012 Summer Olympics in the group all-around event together with other Group Members (Elisa Blanchi, Marta Pagnini, Elisa Santoni, Anzhelika Savrayuk, Andreea Stefanescu).

== Detailed Olympic results ==
| Year | Competition Description | Location | Music | Apparatus | Rank | Score-Final | Rank | Score-Qualifying |
|---|---|---|---|---|---|---|---|---|
| 2012 | Olympics | London | | All-around | 3rd | 55.450 | 2nd | 55.800 |
| 2012 | Olympics | London | Black Gold by Armand Amar | 5 Balls | 2nd | 28.125 | 2nd | 28.100 |
| 2012 | Olympics | London | William Tell Overture by Gioachino Rossini | 3 Ribbons + 2 Hoops | 4th | 27.325 | 2nd | 27.700 |
