= Daniela Masseroni =

Italian rhythmic gymnast

Personal information
- Nationality: Italian
- Born: February 28, 1985 (age 41) Trescore Balneario, Italy
- Height: 1.67 m (5 ft 5 1/2 in)
- Weight: 50 kg (110 lb)

Sport
- Country: Italy
- Sport: Rhythmic gymnastics
- Club: Orobica Bergamo
- Coached by: Emanuela Maccarani
Medal record
Event	1st	2nd	3rd
Olympic Games	0	1	0
World Championships	4	8	2
European Championships	1	5	5
Olympic Games
Silver medal – second place	2004 Athens	Group all-around
World Championships
Gold medal – first place	2010 Moscow	Group All-around
Gold medal – first place	2009 Mie	Group All-around
Gold medal – first place	2009 Mie	3 Ribbons / 2 Ropes
Gold medal – first place	2005 Baku	3 Hoops / 4 Clubs
Silver medal – second place	2010 Moscow	5 Hoops
Silver medal – second place	2010 Moscow	3 Ribbons / 2 Ropes
Silver medal – second place	2009 Mie	5 Hoops
Silver medal – second place	2007 Patras	Group All-around
Silver medal – second place	2007 Patras	5 Ropes
Silver medal – second place	2007 Patras	3 Hoops / 4 Clubs
Silver medal – second place	2005 Baku	Group All-around
Silver medal – second place	2005 Baku	5 Ribbons
Bronze medal – third place	2003 Budapest	5 Ribbons
Bronze medal – third place	2003 Budapest	3 Hoops / 2 Balls
European Championships
Gold medal – first place	2008 Torino	5 Ropes
Silver medal – second place	2010 Bremen	Group All-around
Silver medal – second place	2010 Bremen	3 Ribbons / 2 Ropes
Silver medal – second place	2008 Torino	3 Hoops / 4 Clubs
Silver medal – second place	2006 Moscow	Group All-around
Silver medal – second place	2006 Moscow	3 Hoops / 4 Clubs
Bronze medal – third place	2010 Bremen	5 Hoops
Bronze medal – third place	2008 Torino	Group All-around
Bronze medal – third place	2006 Moscow	5 Ribbons
Bronze medal – third place	2003 Riesa	Group All-around
Bronze medal – third place	2003 Riesa	3 Hoops / 2 Balls

Daniela Masseroni (born 28 February 1985 in Trescore Balneario) is a former Italian rhythmic gymnast.

== Biography ==
She won the silver medal in the competition of rhythmic gymnastics group at Athens Olympics in 2004. She finished 4th in the same event at the 2008 Summer Olympics. She won also 14 medals at the World Championships (four gold), and 11 at the European Championships (one gold at Turin 2008).

== Olympic results ==
Year	Competition	Venue	Position	Event	Score
2004	Olympic Games	(Greece) Athens	2nd	Group all-around	49.450
2008	Olympic Games	(China) Beijing	4th	Group all-around	34.425

== Honours ==

Officer: Ufficiale Ordine al Merito della Repubblica Italiana: 27 September 2004

== See also ==
- Italy at the 2004 Summer Olympics - Medalists
