= Andreea Stefanescu =

Italian rhythmic gymnast (born 1993)

Andreea Ştefănescu
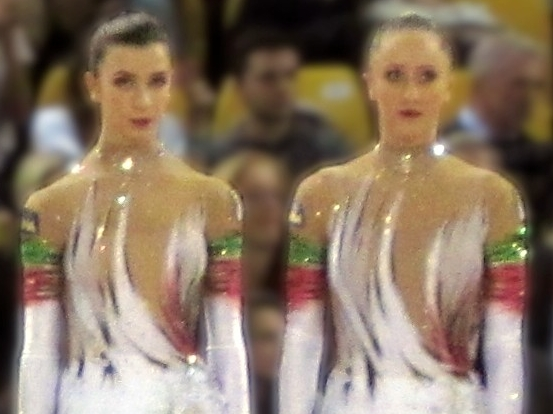
- Born: 13 December 1993 (age 32) Iaşi, Romania

Gymnastics career
- Discipline: Rhythmic gymnastics
- Country represented: Italy
Medal record
Representing Italy
Olympic Games
Bronze medal – third place	2012 London	Group All-around
World Championships
Gold medal – first place	2011 Montpellier	Group All-around
Gold medal – first place	2015 Stuttgart	5 Ribbons
Silver medal – second place	2011 Montpellier	5 Balls
Silver medal – second place	2011 Montpellier	3 Ribbons/ 2 Hoops
Silver medal – second place	2013 Kyiv	Group All-around
Silver medal – second place	2013 Kyiv	10 Clubs
Silver medal – second place	2014 Izmir	Group All-around
Silver medal – second place	2015 Stuttgart	6 Clubs/ 2 Hoops
European Championships
Silver medal – second place	2014 Baku	Group All-around
Bronze medal – third place	2012 N.Novgorod	Group All-around
Bronze medal – third place	2012 N.Novgorod	3 Ribbons/ 2 Hoops

Andreea Ştefănescu (born 13 December 1993 in Iaşi) is a Romanian-born Italian rhythmic gymnast.

== Biography ==
She was part of the 2010 and 2011 Italian team that competed at the World Championships that won the Group All-around gold medal. Her teammates also won a pair of bronze medals at the 2012 World Cup Final in 5 Balls and 3 Ribbons + 2 Hoops. She has won a bronze medal at the 2012 Summer Olympics in the group all-around event together with other team members (Elisa Blanchi, Marta Pagnini, Elisa Santoni, Anzhelika Savrayuk, Romina Laurito).

== Orders ==

CONI: Golden Collar of Sports Merit: Collare d'Oro al Merito Sportivo: 2012

5th Class/Knight: Cavaliere Ordine al Merito della Repubblica Italiana: 2013

== Detailed Olympic results ==
Year	Competition Description	Location	Music	Apparatus	Rank	Score-Final	Rank	Score-Qualifying
2012	Olympics	London		All-around	3rd	55.450	2nd	55.800
2012	Olympics	London	Black Gold by Armand Amar	5 Balls	2nd	28.125	2nd	28.100
2012	Olympics	London	William Tell Overture by Gioachino Rossini	3 Ribbons + 2 Hoops	4th	27.325	2nd	27.700
