= Valeriya Davidova =

Uzbekistani rhythmic gymnast (born 1997)

- Full name: Валерия Давыдова
- Alternative name: Valeriya Davydova
- Born: 15 December 1997 (age 28) Tashkent, Uzbekistan
- Height: 168 cm (5 ft 6 in)

Gymnastics career
- Discipline: Rhythmic gymnastics
- Country represented: Uzbekistan
- Head coach: Rogovaya T. Polivanova L.
- Choreographer: Ildar Kolesyanov
Medal record
Rhythmic gymnastics
Representing Uzbekistan
Asian Games
Gold medal – first place	2014 Incheon	Team
Asian Championships
Gold medal – first place	2013 Tashkent	Team

Valeriya Davidova (Russian: Валерия Давыдова; born 15 December 1997 in Tashkent) is an Uzbekistani former rhythmic gymnast who competed both as an individual and group member. She won gold in the team event at the 2013 Asian Championships and the 2014 Asian Games and a bronze medal in the group all-around at the 2015 Asian Championships. She competed at the 2016 Summer Olympics.

== Career ==
Davidova began gymnastics in 2001 at age 3. Her idols were Evgeniya Kanaeva and Anna Bessonova.

As a junior, Davidova competed at the 2011 Asian Championships, where she won silver in the all-around behind Aliya Assymova. In the apparatus finals, she won four more medals: gold with ball and clubs, silver with hoop, and bronze with ribbon.

As a senior, she competed at the 2013 Asian Championships, where she and her teammates won gold in the team event.

In 2014, she won the national championships. At the 2014 Asian Games, Davidova, along with her teammates Djamila Rakhmatova, Anastasiya Serdyukova, and Ravilya Farkhutdinova, won the gold medal in the team event.

Davidova began competing as a group member in 2015. At the 2015 Asian Championships, she won bronze in the group all-around. They placed 10th in the all-around at the 2015 World Championships.

Davidova and her teammates at the 2016 Gymnastics Olympic Test Event

The next year, they won silver at the 2016 Gymnastics Olympic Test Event. Ahead of the 2016 Summer Olympics in Rio de Janeiro, Davidova and the rest of the national team trained in Houston to acclimatize to the time zone and a similar climate. At the Olympics, they finished in 12th place in the qualifying round.

== Post-competitive career ==
Davidova now coaches in Colorado in the United States.
