= Ekaterina Khilko =

Uzbekistani trampoline gymnast (born 1982)

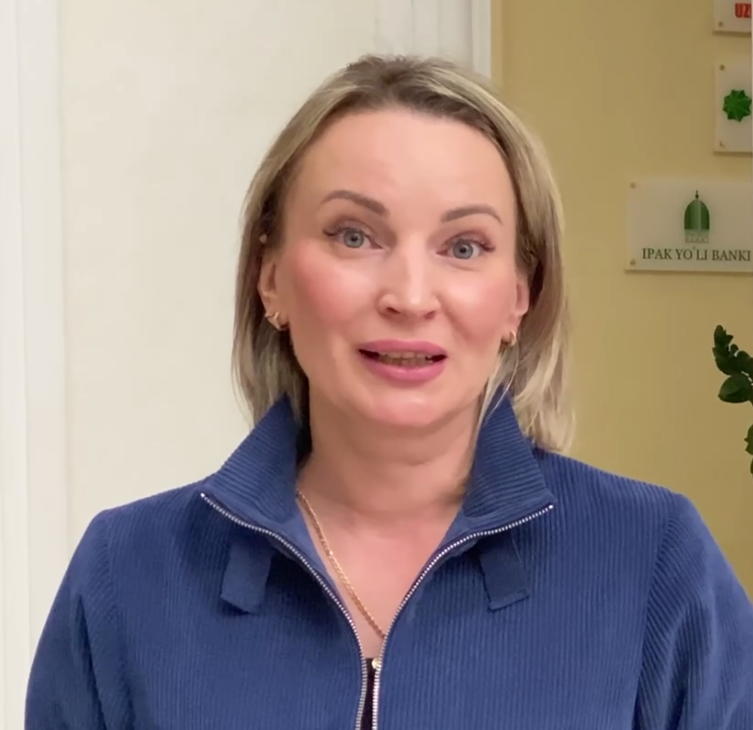
- Khilko in 2023

Personal information
- Full name: Ekaterina Viktorovna Khilko
- Alternative name: Yekaterina Xilko
- Born: 25 March 1982 (age 44) Tashkent, Uzbek SSR, Soviet Union
- Height: 163 cm (5 ft 4 in)

Gymnastics career
- Discipline: Trampoline gymnastics
- Country represented: Uzbekistan
- Club: RUDR Tashkent
- Head coach: Artem Yakubov
Medal record
Women's trampoline gymnastics
Representing Uzbekistan
Olympic Games
Bronze medal – third place	2008 Beijing	Individual
World Championships
Bronze medal – third place	2009 Saint Petersburg	Synchro
Asian Games
Bronze medal – third place	2006 Doha	Individual
Bronze medal – third place	2010 Guangzhou	Individual
Asian Championships
Gold medal – first place	2014 Chiba	Individual
Gold medal – first place	2018 Manila	Individual

Ekaterina Viktorovna Khilko (born 25 March 1982) is a former trampoline gymnast from Uzbekistan. She won a bronze medal at the 2008 Summer Olympics, having previously finished in fourth place at the 2000 Summer Olympics. She also competed at the 2004 and 2012 Summer Olympics. She is a two-time Asian Games bronze medalist in the individual event and the 2009 World bronze medalist in the synchro event.

== Gymnastics career ==
Khilko began trampoline gymnastics when she was eight years old and began competing internationally in 1995. She placed eighth in the individual final at the 1999 World Championships. At the 2000 Summer Olympics, she finished fourth in the individual final, less than a point away from the bronze medalist Karen Cockburn. She finished sixth in the individual final at the 2001 Goodwill Games.

Khilko represented Uzbekistan at the 2004 Summer Olympics but was injured during training. She still competed and finished 11th in the qualifications, missing the final by one point. She stopped training after the Olympics due to the injury and did not return until 2005. At the 2006 Asian Games, she won the individual bronze medal, behind China's Huang Shanshan and Zhong Xingping. She represented Uzbekistan at the 2008 Summer Olympics and qualified for the individual final in eighth place. In the final, she improved her score and won the bronze medal, behind He Wenna and Karen Cockburn.

Khilko competed with Anna Savkina at the 2009 World Championships, and they won the bronze medal in the synchro event. She won the individual title at the 2010 Ghent World Cup. At the 2010 Asian Games, she won the individual bronze medal, behind Huang and He. She represented Uzbekistan at the 2012 Summer Olympics and finished 12th in the qualification round and did not advance into the final.

Khilko won a silver medal in the synchro event at the 2013 Valladolid World Cup with Anna Kasparyan. She did not qualify for the individual final at the 2013 World Championships, finishing 15th.

At the 2014 Asian Championships, she won the individual title after qualifying for the final in fourth place. She then won the silver medal in the synchro event with Kasparyan at the Arosa World Cup. At the 2014 Asian Games, she finished fourth in the individual final. Then at the 2014 World Championships, she finished 53rd in the individual qualification round and did not advance into the final.

By finishing eighth at the 2016 Olympic Test Event, Khilko earned a berth to the 2016 Summer Olympics. She became the first trampoline gymnast to compete at five Olympic Games. She placed 12th in the qualifications and did not advance into the final.
