= 2015 Asian Acrobatic Gymnastics Championships =

International gymnastics competition

The 2015 Asian Acrobatic Gymnastics Championships were the 9th edition of the Asian Acrobatic Gymnastics Championships, and were held in Linan, Xianyou, China from September 17 to September 19, 2015.

== Medal summary ==
=== Senior ===
Event	Gold	Silver	Bronze
Women's pair	North Korea	China	China
Men's pair	Kazakhstan	North Korea	China
Mixed pair	Kazakhstan	North Korea	Uzbekistan
Women's group	China	North Korea	China
Men's group	China	North Korea	—N/a
Team	China	North Korea	—N/a

=== Junior ===
Event	Gold	Silver	Bronze
Women's pair	China	North Korea	Japan
Men's pair	Kazakhstan	China	Turkmenistan
Mixed pair	Kazakhstan	China	Kazakhstan
Women's group	Kazakhstan	Uzbekistan	China
Men's group	Kazakhstan	China	—N/a
Team	Kazakhstan	China	—N/a

== Medal table ==
=== Senior ===
Rank	Nation	Gold	Silver	Bronze	Total
1	China (CHN)	3	1	3	7
2	Kazakhstan (KAZ)	2	0	0	2
3	North Korea (PRK)	1	5	0	6
4	Uzbekistan (UZB)	0	0	1	1
Totals (4 entries)		6	6	4	16

=== Junior ===
Rank	Nation	Gold	Silver	Bronze	Total
1	Kazakhstan (KAZ)	5	0	1	6
2	China (CHN)	1	4	1	6
3	North Korea (PRK)	0	1	0	1
3	Uzbekistan (UZB)	0	1	0	1
5	Japan (JPN)	0	0	1	1
5	Turkmenistan (TKM)	0	0	1	1
Totals (6 entries)		6	6	4	16
