= Deng Senyue =

Chinese rhythmic gymnast

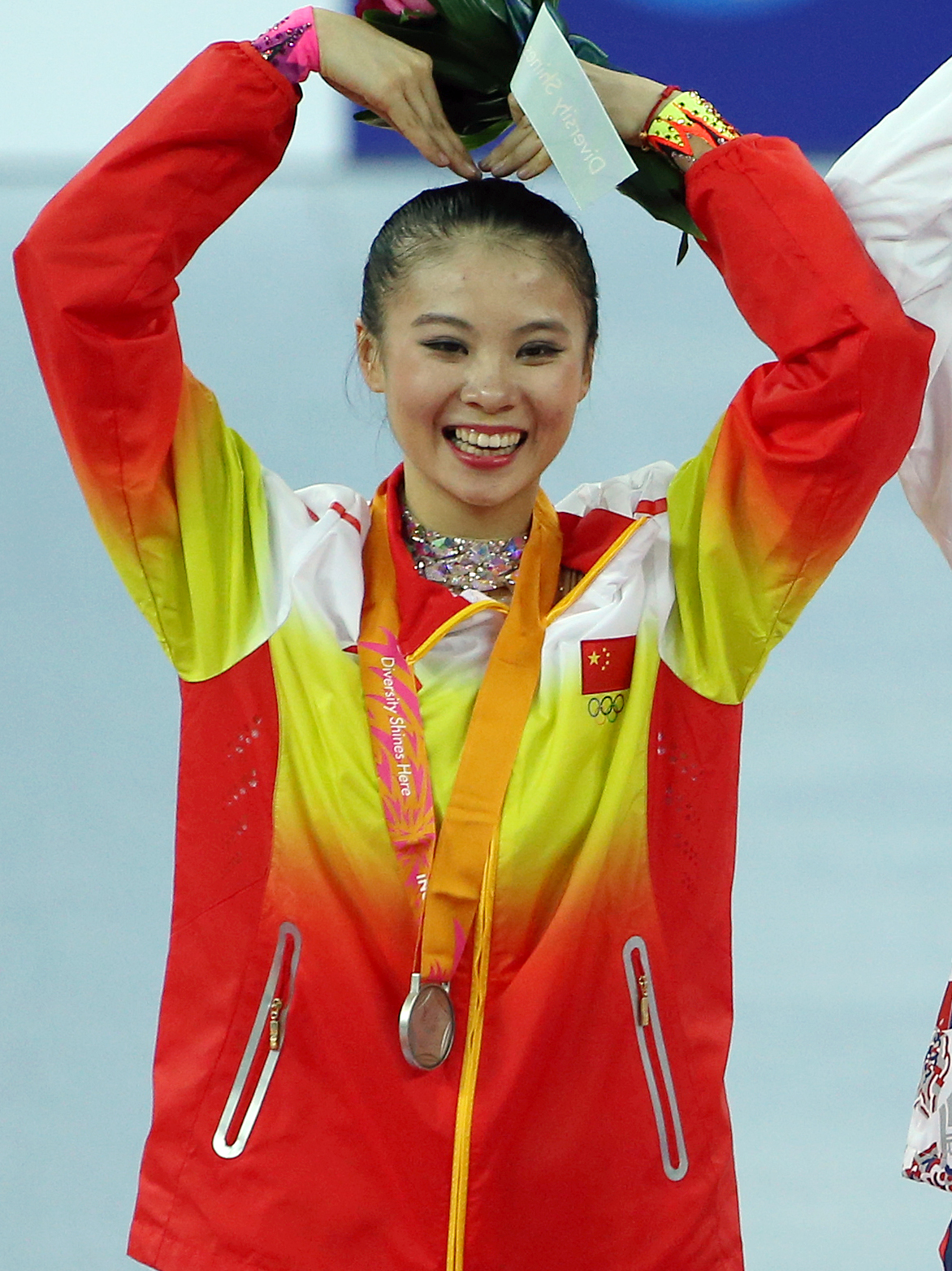

Personal information
- Nickname: Yueyue
- Born: 5 February 1992 (age 34) Liuzhou, Guangxi Province
- Height: 160 cm (5 ft 3 in)

Gymnastics career
- Discipline: Rhythmic gymnastics
- Country represented: China
- Head coach: Yan Yunwen
- Assistant coach: Liu Chang
- Retired: 2014
- World ranking: 21 (2014 Season); 29 (2013 Season); 18 (2012 Season); 52 (2011 Season)
Medal record
Rhythmic Gymnastics
Representing China
Summer Universiade
Bronze medal – third place	2011 Shenzhen	Hoop
Asian Games
Silver medal – second place	2014 Incheon	All-around
Asian Championships
Gold medal – first place	2013 Tashkent	Ball
Gold medal – first place	2013 Tashkent	Ribbon
Silver medal – second place	2011 Astana	Ball
Silver medal – second place	2011 Astana	Hoop
Silver medal – second place	2013 Tashkent	Hoop
Silver medal – second place	2013 Tashkent	Clubs
Bronze medal – third place	2011 Astana	All-around
Bronze medal – third place	2013 Tashkent	All-around
Bronze medal – third place	2013 Tashkent	Team

Deng Senyue (Chinese: 邓森悦; born 5 February 1992 in Liuzhou, Guangxi Province China) is a retired Chinese individual rhythmic gymnast. She finished 4th in All-around at the 2013 World Championships. She is the first Chinese rhythmic gymnast to qualify for apparatus final in the World Championships. She is the first Chinese rhythmic gymnast to win a medal in the World Cup series.

== Career ==
Deng started rhythmic gymnastics at 6 years old, In 1999, she went to Beijing to pursue gymnastics and was recruited by the China Rhythmic Gymnastics Team. She made her senior international debut at the 2007 Aeon Cup.

In 2009, Deng won the gold medal at the 11th National Games, raising her national ranking to first. She finished 21st in the All-around final and 16th in Team at the 2010 World Championships in Moscow, Russia. Deng won a bronze medal in Hoop at the 2011 Summer Universiade and won the bronze medal in all-around at the 2011 Asian Championships. She then represented China at the 2011 World Championships where she finished 13th in the All-around.

She competed in the individual all-around event at the 2012 Summer Olympics, she narrowly missed the finals placing 11th in the qualifications and did not advance into the Top 10 finals.

Deng won her first World Cup series medal at the 2013 World Cup in Lisbon, Portugal, a bronze in the ribbon final (she became the first individual rhythmic gymnast from China to medal at the World Cup series). Deng competed at the 2013 Asian Championships in Tashkent, Uzbekistan where she won the all-around bronze medal with Team China winning the bronze medal. At the finals, Deng became the first Chinese rhythmic gymnast to win 2 gold medals, in ball and in ribbon final ahead of Korean Son Yeon-Jae, she also won silver in clubs and hoop. Deng competed at the 2013 Summer Universiade where she finished 8th in all-around and qualified in all 4 event apparatus finals. Deng competed at the 2013 World Games in Cali where she finished 4th in clubs final behind Alina Maksymenko. She then competed at the 2013 World Championships in Kyiv, Ukraine where she qualified to 2 event finals, she finished 8th in hoop and 5th in clubs ahead of Son Yeon-Jae. Deng became the first Chinese rhythmic gymnast to place in the Top 5 at the World Championships by finishing 4th in the All-around at the 2013 World Championships scoring a total of 70.374 points putting her ahead of Korean Son Yeon-Jae. Deng won her second Nationals Games title in Liaoning.

In 2014, Early in the season Deng was recovering from a foot injury, her first international competition was at the 2014 Corbeil-Essonnes World Cup where she finished 8th in all-around. She qualified to 3 event finals and won her second World Cup medal, a bronze in clubs. On August 8–10, Deng competed at the 2014 Sofia World Cup finishing 7th in all-around. She qualified to 2 event finals placing 5th in hoop and 4th in ball behind Son Yeon-Jae. On September 22–27, Deng represented China at the 2014 World Championships where she qualified to 3 event finals, finishing 5th in hoop, 5th in clubs and 6th in ribbon. In the all-around, Deng finished 5th with a total score of 69.766 points, just behind Korean Son Yeon-Jae who finished 4th. Deng then flew to Incheon, Korea for the 2014 Asian Games where she won the all-around silver medal again behind Korean Son Yeon-Jae.

Deng completed her career at the end of the 2014 Season.

== Achievements ==
- First Asian rhythmic gymnast to place in Top 4 in All-around at the World Championships.
- Second Asian rhythmic gymnast to place in Top 5 at Worlds finishing 4th in All-around at the 2013 World Championships. (Yoko Morino finished 5th in all-around at the 1975 World Championships.)
- First Chinese rhythmic gymnast to qualify for event apparatus final in the World Championships. (hoop, clubs and ribbon in 2013, 2014 Worlds)
- First Chinese rhythmic gymnast to qualify for All-around final in 4 World Championships in a row. (2010, 2011, 2013, 2014 Worlds)
- First Chinese rhythmic gymnast to win a medal in the World Cup series.
- First Chinese rhythmic gymnast to qualify for all 4 event apparatus finals in 2 Universiade in a row. (2011, 2013 Universiade)
- First Chinese rhythmic gymnast to become 2 time All-around champion in National Games. (2009, 2013)
- Highest Chinese individual rhythmic gymnast finishing 11th at the 2012 London Olympic Games. (Currently, Highest Chinese individual rhythmic gymnast finishing an Olympics where the traditionally-dominant post-Soviet republic participated.)

== Competitive history ==
Year	Event	Team	AA	Hoop	Ball	Clubs	Ribbon
2009	National Games		1st				
2009	World Championships	13th					
2010	2010 Asian Games	5th	5th	NH	NH	NH	NH
2010	World Championships	16th	21st				
2011	Asian Championships	4th	3rd	2nd	2nd	4th	5th
2011	Universiade	NH	6th	3rd	5th	6th	5th
2011	World Championships	13th	13th				
2012	Olympic Games	NH	11th	NH	NH	NH	NH
2013	National Games		1st				
2013	Asian Championships	3rd	3rd	2nd	1st	2nd	1st
2013	Universiade	NH	8th	6th	6th	6th	8th
2013	World Championships	NH	4th	8th		5th	
2014	2014 Asian Games	5th	2nd	NH	NH	NH	NH
2014	World Championships	13th	5th	5th		5th	6th

Year	Competition Description	Location	Apparatus	Rank-Final	Score-Final	Rank-Qualifying	Score-Qualifying
2009	World Championships	Ise	Team	13	237.075		
2010	Asian Games	Guangzhou	Team	5	252.300		
2010	Asian Games	Guangzhou	All-around	5	105.350	6	77.700
2010	World Championships	Moscow	Team	16	237.600		
2010	World Championships	Moscow	All-around	21	100.250		
2011	Asian Championships	Astana	Team	4	254.725		
2011	Asian Championships	Astana	All-around	3	105.650	2	106.600
2011	Asian Championships	Astana	Hoop	2	27.500	6	26.450
2011	Asian Championships	Astana	Ball	2	27.700	2	26.925
2011	Asian Championships	Astana	Clubs	4	26.400	2	26.850
2011	Asian Championships	Astana	Ribbon	5	26.900	5	26.375
2011	World Championships	Montpellier	Team	13	252.950		
2011	World Championships	Montpellier	All-around	13	105.900	17	79.250
2012	Olympic Games	London	All-around			11	108.825
2013	Asian Championships	Tashkent	Team	3	163.450		
2013	Asian Championships	Tashkent	All-around	3	70.250	2	53.817
2013	Asian Championships	Tashkent	Hoop	2	18.067		
2013	Asian Championships	Tashkent	Ball	1	18.333		
2013	Asian Championships	Tashkent	Clubs	2	18.133		
2013	Asian Championships	Tashkent	Ribbon	1	18.533		
2013	World Championships	Kyiv	All-around	4	70.374		
2013	World Championships	Kyiv	Hoop	8	16.933	4	17.900
2013	World Championships	Kyiv	Clubs	5	17.816	4	17.916
2014	World Championships	Izmir	Team	13	126.189		
2014	World Championships	Izmir	All-around	5	69.766	7	51.599
2014	World Championships	Izmir	Hoop	5	17.583	4	17.383
2014	World Championships	Izmir	Clubs	5	17.700	5	17.341
2014	World Championships	Izmir	Ribbon	6	16.950	7	16.875
2014	Asian Games	Incheon	Team	5	157.698		
2014	Asian Games	Incheon	All-around	2	70.332	2	52.883

== Routine Music Information ==
Year	Apparatus	Music title
2014	Hoop	The Red Detachment of Women: Act IV by You-Sheng Lin
2014	Ball	Je Suis Malade by Lara Fabian
2014	Clubs	Gopak by Igor Kornelyuk
2014	Ribbon	Shear Plum by Lu Siqing
2013	Hoop	The Red Detachment of Women: Act IV by You-Sheng Lin
2013	Ball	Summertime by David Garrett
2013	Clubs	Gopak by Igor Kornelyuk
2013	Ribbon	Shear Plum by Lu Siqing
2012	Hoop	Kan Yang Ge by Lu Xiaobin
2012	Ball	O mio babbino caro music from Gianni Schicchi by Giacomo Puccini
2012	Clubs	Smooth criminal by David Garrett
2012	Ribbon	Perturbed "Uneasy" by Gong Lin-Na
2011	Hoop	Boléro by Maurice Ravel
2011	Ball	O mio babbino caro music from Gianni Schicchi by Giacomo Puccini
2011	Clubs	Smooth criminal by David Garrett
2011	Ribbon	Perturbed "Uneasy" by Gong Lin-Na
2010	Hoop	Boléro by Maurice Ravel
2010	Ball	Bombay Dreams' (Album Version) music from Bombay Dreams by Ensemble
2010	Rope	Smooth criminal by David Garrett
2010	Ribbon	La Flamenca by Canteca De Macao
2009	Hoop	Boléro by Maurice Ravel
2009	Ball	Bombay Dreams' (Album Version) music from Bombay Dreams by Ensemble
2009	Rope	Smooth criminal by David Garrett
2009	Ribbon	La Flamenca by Canteca De Macao
