= Chongyang cake =

Traditional Chinese cake

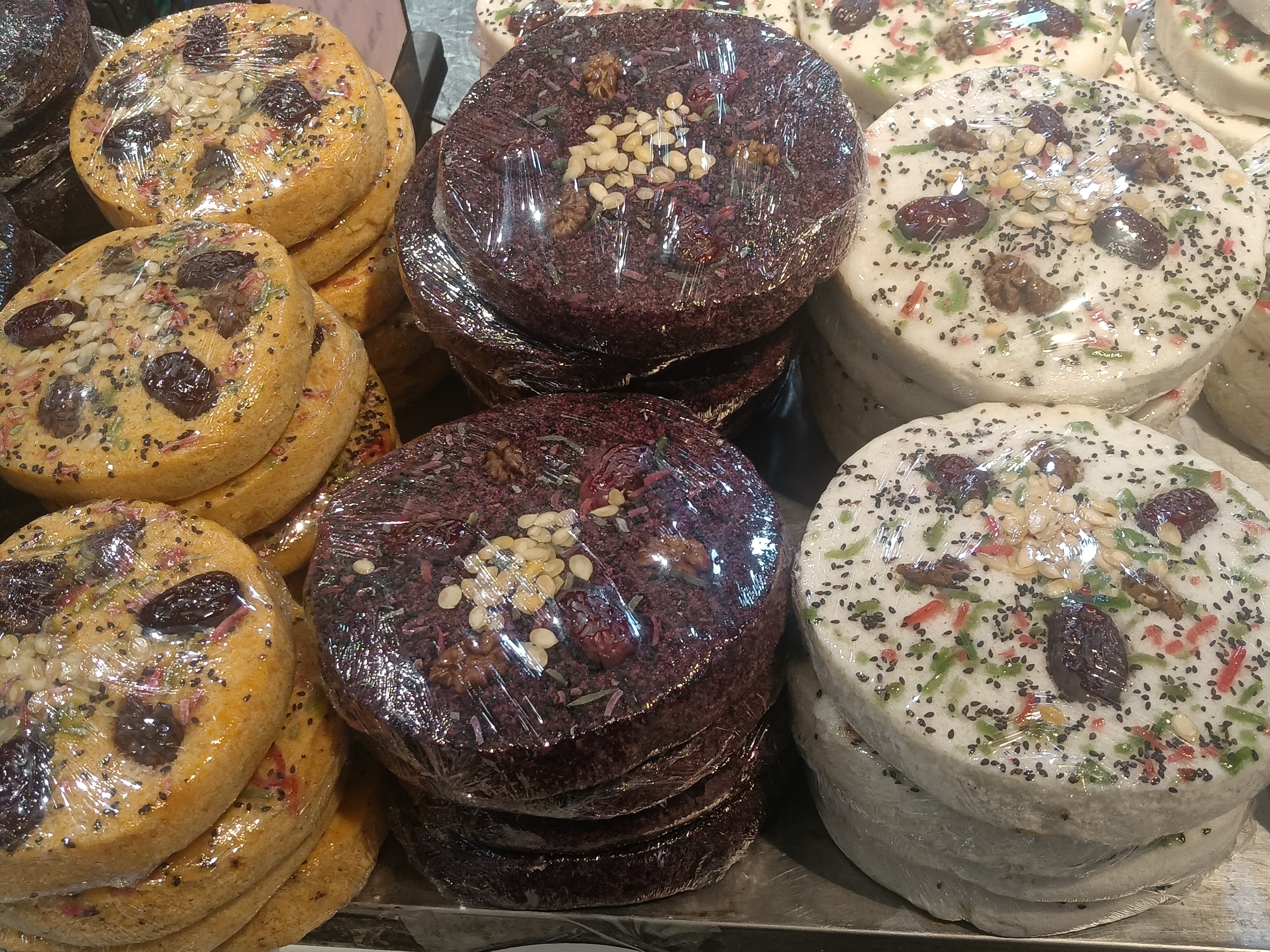
- Type: Cake
- Place of origin: China
- Main ingredients: Rice flour, pulse flour, jujube, chestnuts, almonds

Chongyang cake (Chinese: 重陽糕; pinyin: Chóngyáng gāo) is a traditional cake eaten on the Chongyang Festival. A mixture mainly made up of rice flour and sugar is baked and steamed, then decorated with jujube, chestnuts, and almonds. As the word for "cake" (糕) sounds like the one for "height" (高) in Chinese, people regard it as a lucky food.

== History ==
Chongyang cake's popularity began in the Tang dynasty. In the Song dynasty, the cakes became popular in Bianjing (now called Kaifeng), in Linan (now Zhejiang), Hangzhou and other major cities. To this day, the sweet remains popular throughout China. The food symbolizes the appreciation and memory of families and friends who have passed, while also reminding people to value and highlight the importance of family relationships.

== Legends of the origin ==
The first version of the story of the origins of the cake says that before Liu Yu became an emperor, he was in the Chongyang Festival in Pengcheng. When he became the emperor, he made a law that allowed people to ride, shoot, and review the troops every year on the ninth day of the ninth lunar month. The Chongyang cakes were given out to the soldiers. The other version says that Kang Hai (the Zhuangyuan of the Ming dynasty, from Shanxi, attended the imperial ranking examination in August. However, he became ill and got stuck in Chang'an. He was not at home when a reporter went to his hometown to tell him the good news, but Kang Hai was still in Chang'an, and the reporter was unwilling to leave without a reward. When he came back, it was the ninth day of the ninth lunar month, the day of the Chongyang Festival. As a reward, he gave the reporter money and some cakes to celebrate his success. Because the cakes were used to celebrate his success, families who had children who were going to take school exams would give out cakes to them and the neighborhood as a symbol of good luck, and as such the custom of eating Chongyang cakes spread.

== See also ==
- List of cakes
