= 2022 Asian Aerobic Gymnastics Championships =

The 2022 Asian Aerobic Gymnastics Championships were the seventh edition of the Asian Aerobic Gymnastics Championships, and were held in Pattaya, Thailand from September 3 to 5, 2022.

== Medal summary ==
| Event | Gold | Silver | Bronze |
|---|---|---|---|
| Men's individual | Kim Hanjin; South Korea | Phan The Gia Hien; Vietnam | Chanokpon Jiumsukjai; Thailand |
| Women's individual | Chawisa Intakul; Thailand | Tran Ha Vi; Vietnam | Kim Hyeonji; South Korea |
| Mixed pair | Vietnam | Vietnam | South Korea |
| Trio | Vietnam | Vietnam | South Korea |
| Group | Vietnam | South Korea | Thailand |
| Dance | South Korea | Thailand | Mongolia |

== Medal table ==
| Rank | Nation | Gold | Silver | Bronze | Total |
|---|---|---|---|---|---|
| 1 | Vietnam (VIE) | 3 | 4 | 0 | 7 |
| 2 | South Korea (KOR) | 2 | 1 | 3 | 6 |
| 3 | Thailand (THA) | 1 | 1 | 2 | 4 |
| 4 | Mongolia (MGL) | 0 | 0 | 1 | 1 |
| Totals (4 entries) | | 6 | 6 | 6 | 18 |
