= 2023 Asian Acrobatic Gymnastics Championships =

The 2023 Asian Acrobatic Gymnastics Championships were held in Tashkent, Uzbekistan from October 18 to 20, 2023.

== Medal summary ==
=== Senior ===
Event	Gold	Silver	Bronze
Men's pairs	Kazakhstan	Hong Kong	India
Women's pairs	Kazakhstan	India	None awarded
Mixed pairs	Uzbekistan	India	None awarded
Men's group	Uzbekistan	India	None awarded
Women's group	India	None awarded	None awarded

=== Junior ===
Event	Gold	Silver	Bronze
Men's pair	Kazakhstan	None awarded	None awarded
Women's pair	Uzbekistan	Kazakhstan	None awarded
Mixed pair	Kazakhstan	Uzbekistan	None awarded
Men's group	Kazakhstan	Uzbekistan	None awarded
Women's group	Kazakhstan	Uzbekistan	Hong Kong

== Medal table ==
Rank	Nation	Gold	Silver	Bronze	Total
1	Kazakhstan (KAZ)	6	1	0	7
2	Uzbekistan (UZB)	3	3	0	6
3	India (IND)	1	3	1	5
4	Hong Kong (HKG)	0	1	1	2
Totals (4 entries)		10	8	2	20
