= 2017 Asian Aerobic Gymnastics Championships =

Gymnastics championship in Ulaanbaatar, Mongolia

The 2017 Asian Aerobic Gymnastics Championships were the sixth edition of the Asian Aerobic Gymnastics Championships, and were held in Ulaanbaatar, Mongolia from September 13 to 18, 2017.

== Medal summary ==
Event	Gold	Silver	Bronze
Men's individual	Pan Lixi; China	Lai Quang Anh; Vietnam	Nguyen Viet Anh; Vietnam
Women's individual	Riri Kitazume; Japan	Ton Nu Thanh Thanh; Vietnam	Cha Yurim; South Korea
Mixed pair	China	Vietnam	South Korea
Trio	Vietnam	China	Mongolia
Group	Vietnam	China	Mongolia

== Medal table ==
Rank	Nation	Gold	Silver	Bronze	Total
1	Vietnam (VIE)	2	3	1	6
2	China (CHN)	2	2	0	4
3	Japan (JPN)	1	0	0	1
4	Mongolia (MGL)	0	0	2	2
4	South Korea (KOR)	0	0	2	2
Totals (5 entries)		5	5	5	15
