= 2022 Asian Acrobatic Gymnastics Championships =

The 2022 Asian Acrobatic Gymnastics Championships were the 12th edition of the Asian Acrobatic Gymnastics Championships, and were held in Pavlodar, Kazakhstan from September 23 to 28, 2022. The competition was approved by the International Gymnastics Federation.

== Medal summary ==
=== Senior ===
Event	Gold	Silver	Bronze
Men's pair	Kazakhstan	India	None awarded
Women's pair	India	None awarded	None awarded
Mixed pair	Uzbekistan	Kazakhstan	India
Men's group	Uzbekistan	Kazakhstan	India
Women's group	India	None awarded	None awarded

=== Junior ===
Event	Gold	Silver	Bronze
Men's pair	Uzbekistan	Kazakhstan	None awarded
Women's pair	Kazakhstan	Uzbekistan	None awarded
Mixed pair	Kazakhstan	Uzbekistan	None awarded
Men's group	Kazakhstan	None awarded	None awarded
Women's group	Kazakhstan	Uzbekistan	None awarded

== Medal table ==
Rank	Nation	Gold	Silver	Bronze	Total
1	Kazakhstan (KAZ)	5	3	0	8
2	Uzbekistan (UZB)	3	3	0	6
3	India (IND)	2	1	2	5
Totals (3 entries)		10	7	2	19
