= 2019 Asian Acrobatic Gymnastics Championships =

International gymnastics competition

The 2019 Asian Acrobatic Gymnastics Championships were the 11th edition of the Asian Acrobatic Gymnastics Championships, and were held in Tashkent, Uzbekistan from October 10 to 12, 2019.

== Medal summary ==
=== Senior ===
Event	Gold	Silver	Bronze
Women's pair	North Korea	Kazakhstan	Uzbekistan
Men's pair	Kazakhstan Uzbekistan	—N/a	Iran
Mixed pair	Kazakhstan	North Korea	Uzbekistan
Women's group	China	Uzbekistan	India
Men's group	Kazakhstan	Uzbekistan	India

=== Age group (12–18) ===
Event	Gold	Silver	Bronze
Women's pair	Kazakhstan	Uzbekistan	Hong Kong
Men's pair	Kazakhstan	Uzbekistan	Iran
Mixed pair	Kazakhstan	Uzbekistan	India
Women's group	Kazakhstan	Uzbekistan	India
Men's group	Uzbekistan	Kazakhstan	Iran

== Medal table ==
Rank	Nation	Gold	Silver	Bronze	Total
1	Kazakhstan (KAZ)	7	2	0	9
2	Uzbekistan (UZB)	2	6	2	10
3	North Korea (PRK)	1	1	0	2
4	China (CHN)	1	0	0	1
5	India (IND)	0	0	4	4
6	Iran (IRI)	0	0	3	3
7	Hong Kong (HKG)	0	0	1	1
Totals (7 entries)		11	9	10	30
