= 2009 Asian Aerobic Gymnastics Championships =

International gymnastics competition

The 2009 Asian Aerobic Gymnastics Championships were the first edition of the Asian Aerobic Gymnastics Championships, and were held in Bangkok, Thailand from March 27 to March 29, 2009.

== Medal summary ==
| Event | Gold | Silver | Bronze |
|---|---|---|---|
| Men's individual | Ao Jinping; China | Jong-Kun Song; South Korea | Kyung-Ho Lee; South Korea |
| Women's individual | Jinxuan Huang; China | Asami Takeuchi; Japan | Qin Zou; China |
| Mixed pair | China; Shinjian He; Jinxuan Huang | South Korea; Mi-Hyun Shim; Won-Ho Cho | China; Zhenhua Ni; Qin Zou |
| Trio | China; Le Tao; Wei Yu; Peng Zhang | South Korea; Jong-Kun Song; In-Chan Hwang; Chang-Il Yoon | South Korea; Tai-Jin Park; Shung-Hwa Lee; Shung-Kyu Song] |

== Medal table ==
| Rank | Nation | Gold | Silver | Bronze | Total |
|---|---|---|---|---|---|
| 1 | China (CHN) | 4 | 0 | 2 | 6 |
| 2 | South Korea (KOR) | 0 | 3 | 2 | 5 |
| 3 | Japan (JPN) | 0 | 1 | 0 | 1 |
| Totals (3 entries) | | 4 | 4 | 4 | 12 |
