= 2013 Asian Acrobatic Gymnastics Championships =

International gymnastics competition

The 2013 Asian Acrobatic Gymnastics Championships were the 8th edition of the Asian Acrobatic Gymnastics Championships, and were held in Pavlodar, Kazakhstan from April 25 to April 30, 2013.

== Medal summary ==
Event	Gold	Silver	Bronze
Women's pair	North Korea	Kazakhstan	China
Men's pair	Kazakhstan Uzbekistan	None awarded	Iran
Mixed pair	Kazakhstan	North Korea	China
Women's group	China	Kazakhstan	Uzbekistan
Men's group	China	Kazakhstan	Uzbekistan

== Medal table ==
Rank	Nation	Gold	Silver	Bronze	Total
1	Kazakhstan (KAZ)	2	3	0	5
2	China (CHN)	2	0	2	4
3	North Korea (PRK)	1	1	0	2
4	Uzbekistan (UZB)	1	0	2	3
5	Iran (IRI)	0	0	1	1
Totals (5 entries)		6	4	5	15
