= 2007 Asian Acrobatic Gymnastics Championships =

International gymnastics competition

The 2007 Asian Acrobatic Gymnastics Championships were the sixth edition of the Asian Acrobatic Gymnastics Championships, and were held in Almaty, Kazakhstan, from July 4 to July 9, 2007.

== Participating nations ==
- China
- Kazakhstan
- Kyrgyzstan
- Tajikistan
- Uzbekistan

== Medal summary ==
Event	Gold	Silver	Bronze
Men's pair	China	Kazakhstan	Unknown
Team	China	Kazakhstan	Uzbekistan
