= Xianyou County =

Xianyou 仙游县 Sienyu; Hsienyu
- County
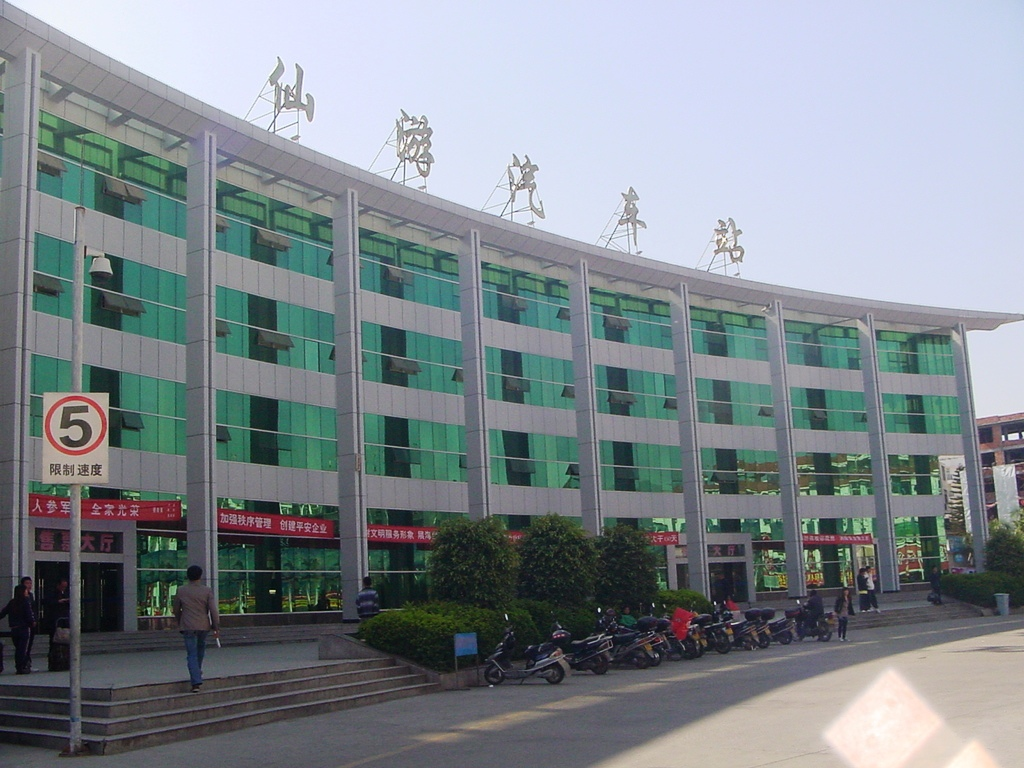
- Xianyou County Bus Station

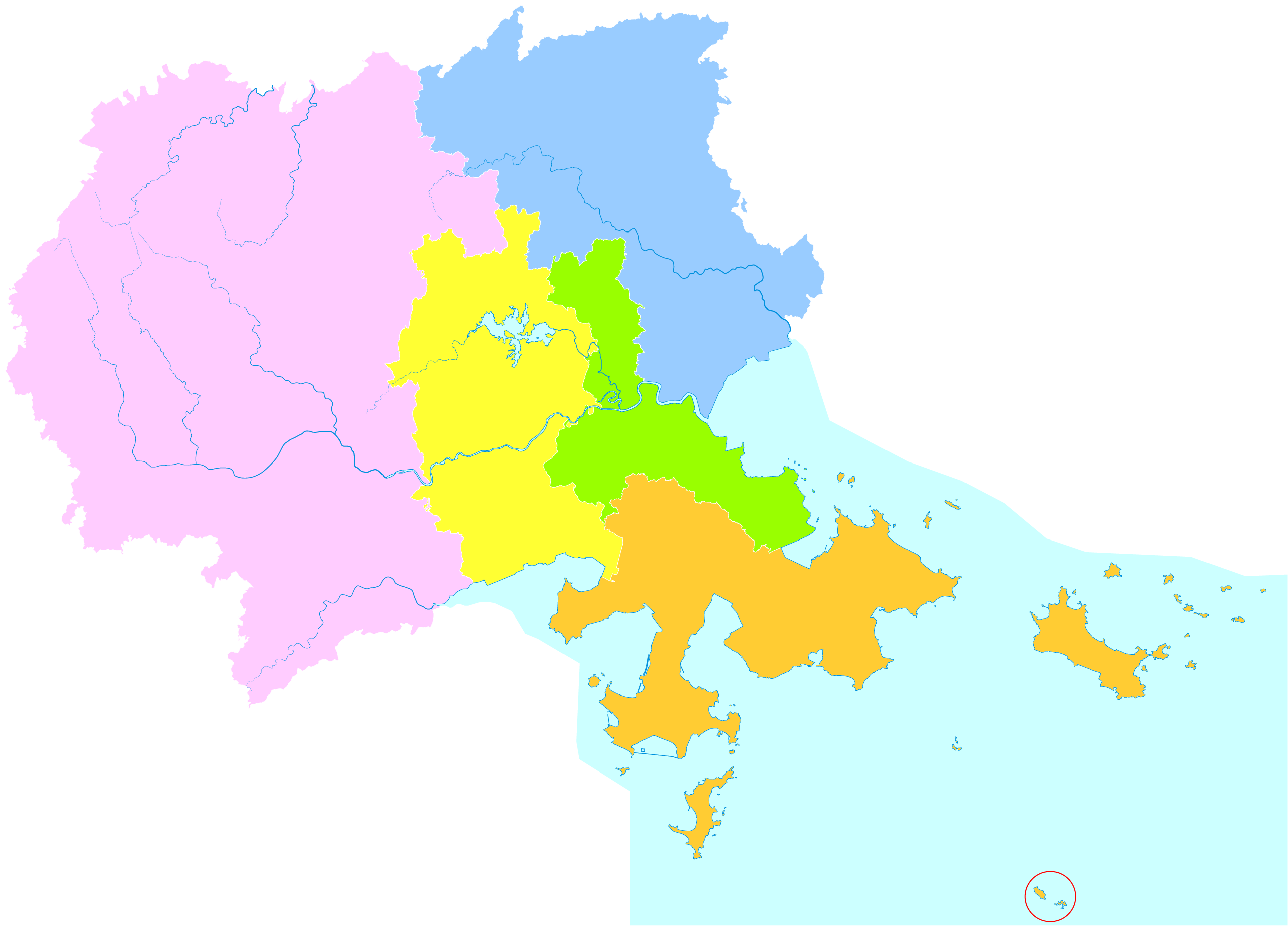
- Xianyou (westernmost division) in Putian

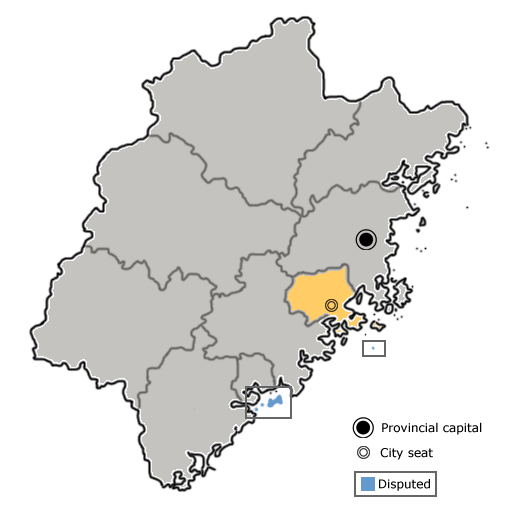
- Putian in Fujian
- Coordinates: 25°21′43″N 118°41′31″E
- Country: People's Republic of China
- Province: Fujian
- Prefecture-level city: Putian

Area
  - Total: 1,815 km^{2} (701 sq mi)

Population (2020 census)
  - Total: 905,068
  - Density: 498.7/km^{2} (1,292/sq mi)
- Time zone: UTC+8 (China Standard)
- Postal code: 351200
- Area code: (0)594
- Licence plates: 闽B
- Website: www.xianyou.gov.cn

Xianyou (simplified Chinese: 仙游县; traditional Chinese: 仙遊縣; pinyin: Xiānyóu Xiàn; Puxian Min: Sing-iú gā̤ⁿ) is a county in the municipal region of Putian, in eastern Fujian province, People's Republic of China.

== Administration ==
The county seat is in Licheng Subdistrict (鲤城街道).

=== Towns (镇, zhen) ===
- Linan (鲤南镇)
- Laidian (赖店)
- Youyang (游洋)
- Zhongshan (钟山)
- Duwei (度尾)
- Bangtou (榜头)
- Daji (大济)
- Longhua (龙华)
- Gaiwei (盖尾)
- Jiaowei (郊尾)
- Fengting (枫亭)
- Yuanzhuang (园庄)

=== Townships (乡, xiang) ===
- Shicang (石苍)
- Xiangxi (象溪)
- Xiyuan (西苑)
- Shexing (社硎)
- Shufeng (书峰)

== Climate ==
Climate data for Xianyou, elevation 78 m (256 ft), (1991–2020 normals, extremes 1991–present)
Month	Jan	Feb	Mar	Apr	May	Jun	Jul	Aug	Sep	Oct	Nov	Dec	Year
Record high °C (°F)	28.7 (83.7)	33.2 (91.8)	33.2 (91.8)	34.9 (94.8)	37.1 (98.8)	38.4 (101.1)	39.6 (103.3)	39.9 (103.8)	40.0 (104.0)	37.1 (98.8)	33.7 (92.7)	29.7 (85.5)	40.0 (104.0)
Mean daily maximum °C (°F)	17.5 (63.5)	18.2 (64.8)	20.6 (69.1)	25.1 (77.2)	28.5 (83.3)	31.4 (88.5)	34.3 (93.7)	33.6 (92.5)	31.6 (88.9)	27.9 (82.2)	24.2 (75.6)	19.7 (67.5)	26.1 (78.9)
Daily mean °C (°F)	12.5 (54.5)	13.2 (55.8)	15.5 (59.9)	20.0 (68.0)	23.7 (74.7)	26.9 (80.4)	29.1 (84.4)	28.5 (83.3)	26.8 (80.2)	23.0 (73.4)	19.2 (66.6)	14.6 (58.3)	21.1 (70.0)
Mean daily minimum °C (°F)	9.3 (48.7)	10.0 (50.0)	12.2 (54.0)	16.5 (61.7)	20.4 (68.7)	23.7 (74.7)	25.3 (77.5)	25.1 (77.2)	23.3 (73.9)	19.4 (66.9)	15.8 (60.4)	11.2 (52.2)	17.7 (63.8)
Record low °C (°F)	−1.0 (30.2)	−0.2 (31.6)	1.4 (34.5)	7.3 (45.1)	12.7 (54.9)	15.3 (59.5)	20.8 (69.4)	21.2 (70.2)	15.6 (60.1)	9.3 (48.7)	3.4 (38.1)	−2.2 (28.0)	−2.2 (28.0)
Average precipitation mm (inches)	51.0 (2.01)	77.5 (3.05)	124.7 (4.91)	135.5 (5.33)	230.7 (9.08)	280.6 (11.05)	194.4 (7.65)	266 (10.5)	151.5 (5.96)	54.1 (2.13)	38.7 (1.52)	38.4 (1.51)	1,643.1 (64.7)
Average precipitation days (≥ 0.1 mm)	8.5	10.9	15.4	14.6	16.3	16.6	11.8	15.5	10.1	5.0	6.0	7.0	137.7
Average snowy days	0.1	0	0	0	0	0	0	0	0	0	0	0	0.1
Average relative humidity (%)	74	76	78	77	79	81	75	78	75	69	71	71	75
Mean monthly sunshine hours	126.1	102.6	112.9	131.3	139.2	155.4	238.4	209.2	183.3	179.7	147.2	142.8	1,868.1
Percentage possible sunshine	38	32	30	34	34	38	57	52	50	51	45	44	42
Source: China Meteorological Administration
