= 2015 Asian Aerobic Gymnastics Championships =

5th edition of the Asian Aerobics Gymnastics Champions

The 2015 Asian Aerobic Gymnastics Championships were the fifth edition of the Asian Aerobic Gymnastics Championships, and were held in Ho Chi Minh City, Vietnam from December 11 to December 13, 2015.

== Medal summary ==
Event	Gold	Silver	Bronze
Men's individual	Han-Jin Kim; South Korea	Mizuki Saito; Japan	Chanawit Thongdee; Thailand
Women's individual	Yu Yangyang; China	Mana Kodama; Japan	Chao Ma; China
Mixed pair	China	China	South Korea
Trio	South Korea	China	Japan
Group	China	South Korea	South Korea
Dance	South Korea	Mongolia	Vietnam
Step	Mongolia	South Korea	Vietnam

== Medal table ==
Rank	Nation	Gold	Silver	Bronze	Total
1	South Korea (KOR)	3	2	2	7
2	China (CHN)	3	2	1	6
3	Mongolia (MGL)	1	1	0	2
4	Japan (JPN)	0	2	1	3
5	Vietnam (VIE)	0	0	2	2
6	Thailand (THA)	0	0	1	1
Totals (6 entries)		7	7	7	21
