= Gymnastics at the 2008 Summer Olympics – Women's trampoline =

Women's trampoline at the Games of the XXIX Olympiad

Medalists
1st place, gold medalist(s)		He Wenna	China
2nd place, silver medalist(s)		Karen Cockburn	Canada
3rd place, bronze medalist(s)		Ekaterina Khilko	Uzbekistan

Women's trampoline competition at the 2008 Summer Olympics was held on August 18 at the Beijing National Indoor Stadium.

The competition consisted of two rounds. In the first, each gymnast performed two routines on the trampoline. One routine included required elements, while the other was a voluntary routine. Scores were given for both execution and difficulty in each routine, summed to give a routine score. The two routine scores in the first round determined qualification for the second; the eight top finishers moved on to the final. The final consisted entirely of a single voluntary routine, with no preliminary scores being carried over.

== Qualification round ==
Position	Gymnast	Country	Compulsory	Voluntary	Penalty	Total	Notes
1	He Wenna	China	30.1	37.1		67.2	Q
2	Irina Karavaeva	Russia	29.7	36.7		66.4	Q
3	Rosannagh MacLennan	Canada	29.9	36.1		66.0	Q
4	Karen Cockburn	Canada	28.6	37.0		65.6	Q
5	Luba Golovina	Georgia	28.7	36.2		64.9	Q
6	Olena Movchan	Ukraine	28.1	36.7		64.8	Q
7	Anna Dogonadze	Germany	29.7	34.6		64.3	Q
8	Ekaterina Khilko	Uzbekistan	29.1	34.8		63.9	Q
9	Tatsiana Piatrenia	Belarus	28.6	35.2		63.8	R
10	Claire Wright	Great Britain	29.1	34.0		63.1	R
11	Natalia Chernova	Russia	29.0	34.0		63.0	
12	Haruka Hirota	Japan	28.5	34.1		62.6	
13	Erin Blanchard	United States	27.1	33.8		60.9	
14	Shanshan Huang	China	30.0	29.0		59.0	
15	Lenka Popkin	Czech Republic	25.8	31.8		57.6	
16	Ana Rente	Portugal	27.1	4.5		31.6	

- Q = Qualified for Finals
- R = Reserve

== Final ==
Position	Gymnast	Execution					Difficulty	Penalty	Total
Position	Gymnast	J1	J2	J3	J4	J5	Difficulty	Penalty	Total
Gold medal	He Wenna (CHN)	7.8	7.6	7.8	7.9	7.7	14.5	0	37.8
Silver medal	Karen Cockburn (CAN)	7.5	7.3	7.5	7.6	7.5	14.4	0	37.0
Bronze medal	Ekaterina Khilko (UZB)	7.5	7.6	7.4	7.5	7.5	14.4	0	36.9
4	Olena Movchan (UKR)	7.7	7.6	7.7	7.3	7.4	13.9	0	36.6
5	Irina Karavaeva (RUS)	7.1	7.1	7.2	7.2	7.4	14.7	0	36.2
6	Luba Golovina (GEO)	7.4	7.5	7.7	7.6	7.7	13.3	0	36.1
7	Rosannagh MacLennan (CAN)	7.0	6.7	6.8	7.3	7.3	14.4	0	35.5
8	Anna Dogonadze (GER)	3.6	3.5	3.6	4.0	3.5	8.2	0	18.9
