= 2014 Asian Trampoline Gymnastics Championships =

International gymnastics competition

The 2014 Asian Trampoline Gymnastics Championships was held in Chiba, Japan, June 2–4, 2014. It was the third edition of the Junior Asian Trampoline Gymnastics Championships, but the first one to also feature a senior competition.

== Participating nations ==
- Japan
- Kazakhstan
- Qatar
- Thailand
- Uzbekistan

== Medal winners ==
Event	Gold	Silver	Bronze
Senior men	Masaki Ito; Japan	Tetsuya Sotomura; Japan	Yernur Syzdyk; Kazakhstan
Senior women	Ekaterina Khilko; Uzbekistan	Anna Kasparyan; Uzbekistan	Megu Uyama; Japan
