= 2011 Asian Rhythmic Gymnastics Championships =

International rhythmic gymnastics competition

The 5th Rhythmic Gymnastics Asian Championships was held in Astana, Kazakhstan from 16 – 18 June 2011.

== Medal winners ==
=== Senior ===
Event	Gold	Silver	Bronze
Team
All-around	Kazakhstan; Anna Alyabyeva; Mizana Ismailova; Madina Mukanova; Marina Petrakova	Japan; Riko Anakubo; Hiromi Nakatsu; Yuria Onuki; Runa Yamaguchi	Uzbekistan; Djamila Rakhmatova; Zamirajon Sanokulova; Ulyana Trofimova
Individual
All-around	Anna Alyabyeva; Kazakhstan	Ulyana Trofimova; Uzbekistan	Deng Senyue; China
Hoop	Anna Alyabyeva; Kazakhstan	Deng Senyue; China	Ulyana Trofimova; Uzbekistan
Ball	Anna Alyabyeva; Kazakhstan	Deng Senyue; China	Runa Yamaguchi; Japan
Clubs	Marina Petrakova; Kazakhstan	Djamila Rakhmatova; Uzbekistan	Anna Alyabyeva; Kazakhstan
Ribbon	Anna Alyabyeva; Kazakhstan	Ulyana Trofimova; Uzbekistan	Marina Petrakova; Kazakhstan
Group
All-around	Japan	China	Uzbekistan
5 balls	China	Japan	Uzbekistan
3 ribbons and 2 hoops	China	Kazakhstan	Japan

=== Junior ===
Event	Gold	Silver	Bronze
All-around	Aliya Assymova; Kazakhstan	Valeriya Davidova; Uzbekistan	Mayya Filippova; Uzbekistan
Hoop	Aliya Assymova; Kazakhstan	Valeriya Davidova; Uzbekistan	Ikegaya Haruka; Japan
Ball	Valeriya Davidova; Uzbekistan	Hayakawa Sakura; Japan	Aliya Assymova; Kazakhstan
Clubs	Valeriya Davidova; Uzbekistan	Aliya Assymova; Kazakhstan	Wong Poh San; Malaysia
Ribbon	Aliya Assymova; Kazakhstan	Wong Poh San; Malaysia	Valeriya Davidova; Uzbekistan

== Medal table ==
Rank	Nation	Gold	Silver	Bronze	Total
1	Kazakhstan (KAZ)	9	2	3	14
2	Uzbekistan (UZB)	2	5	6	13
3	China (CHN)	2	3	1	6
4	Japan (JPN)	1	3	3	7
5	Malaysia (MYS)	0	1	1	2
Totals (5 entries)		14	14	14	42

== Results ==
=== Team ===
The team final was held on 16 October 2010. The team final score was the total of top 10 scores.

Rank	Nation	Hoop (rhythmic gymnastics)	Ball (rhythmic gymnastics)	Clubs (rhythmic gymnastics)	Ribbon (rhythmic gymnastics)	Final Total
1st place, gold medalist(s)	Kazakhstan	80.050	80.975	78.400	79.325	269.975
2nd place, silver medalist(s)	Japan	79.400	77.575	76.150	77.975	261.850
3rd place, bronze medalist(s)	Uzbekistan	77.575	77.300	76.645	75.900	258.575
4	China	75.175	76.725	75.450	75.300	254.725
5	Chinese Taipei	70.900	69.100	68.300	66.700	232.775
6	Indonesia	63.475	63.225	61.025	58.675	208.700

==== Details ====
Rank	Nation	Gymnast	Hoop (rhythmic gymnastics)	Ball (rhythmic gymnastics)	Clubs (rhythmic gymnastics)	Ribbon (rhythmic gymnastics)	Total
1st place, gold medalist(s)	Kazakhstan	Anna Alyabyeva	27.925	28.200	27.900	28.150	269.675
1st place, gold medalist(s)	Kazakhstan	Marina Petrakova	26.825	26.875	25.950	26.650	269.675
1st place, gold medalist(s)	Kazakhstan	Mizana Ismailova	-	25.900	~~24.550~~	~~24.525~~	269.675
1st place, gold medalist(s)	Kazakhstan	Madina Mukanova	25.300	-	-	-	269.675
2nd place, silver medalist(s)	Japan	Runa Yamaguchi	26.900	26.075	26.150	26.825	261.850
2nd place, silver medalist(s)	Japan	Yuria Onuki	26.500	25.900	25.400	26.500	261.850
2nd place, silver medalist(s)	Japan	Hiromi Nakatsu	26.000	25.600	-	-	261.850
2nd place, silver medalist(s)	Japan	Riko Anakubo	-	-	~~24.600~~	~~24.650~~	261.850
3rd place, bronze medalist(s)	Uzbekistan	Ulyana Trofimova	26.900	25.950	26.450	25.350	258.575
3rd place, bronze medalist(s)	Uzbekistan	Djamila Rahmatova	25.200	25.900	25.750	26.150	258.575
3rd place, bronze medalist(s)	Uzbekistan	Zamirajon Sanokulova	25.475	25.450	~~24.445~~	~~24.400~~	258.575
4	China	Deng Senyue	26.450	26.925	26.850	26.375	254.725
4	China	Peng Linyi	24.575	25.150	24.825	24.650	254.725
4	China	Hou Yanan	~~24.150~~	24.650	~~23.775~~	-	254.725
4	China	Yang Yuqing	-	-	-	24.275	254.725
5	Chinese Taipei	Kung Yun	24.150	22.750	23.550	22.700	232.775
5	Chinese Taipei	Ku Ni-chen	24.125	23.925	~~21.450~~	23.225	232.775
5	Chinese Taipei	Hsu Tzu-chi	22.625	22.425	-	~~20.775~~	232.775
5	Chinese Taipei	Wang Yi-chieh	-	-	23.300	-	232.775
6	Indonesia	Dinda Defriana	20.025	22.250	20.700	20.350	208.700
6	Indonesia	Carlin Agustia	22.050	21.875	20.000	~~18.600~~	208.700
6	Indonesia	Sinta Ernawati	21.400	~~19.100~~	-	19.725	208.700
6	Indonesia	Nabila Evandestiera	12.475	~~11.800~~	13.400	-	208.700
Individuals
-	Thailand	Tharatip Sridee	23.825	25.375	23.550	24.350	
-	Thailand	Temfah Krisanayuth	23.950	23.175	22.500	23.500	
-	Kyrgyzstan	Ainura Sharhembieva	24.000	25.400	23.600	23.325	
-	Mongolia	Erdenezaya Baatarjav	22.250	19.325	19.600	17.650	

=== Individual All-around ===
Rank	Gymnast	Nation	Hoop (rhythmic gymnastics)	Ball (rhythmic gymnastics)	Clubs (rhythmic gymnastics)	Ribbon (rhythmic gymnastics)	Total
1st place, gold medalist(s)	Anna Alyabyeva	Kazakhstan	28.250	27.550	28.600	28.400	112.800
2nd place, silver medalist(s)	Ulyana Trofimova	Uzbekistan	26.900	27.650	26.550	27.750	108.850
3rd place, bronze medalist(s)	Deng Senyue	China	27.550	26.350	26.300	25.450	105.650
4	Runa Yamaguchi	Japan	26.700	26.500	26.300	25.800	105.300
5	Djamila Rahmatova	Uzbekistan	26.000	26.400	26.650	25.650	104.700
6	Marina Petrakova	Kazakhstan	25.500	26.950	26.725	25.100	104.275
7	Yuria Onuki	Japan	25.950	25.050	25.950	25.950	102.900
8	Peng Linyi	China	25.500	25.450	26.200	25.250	102.400
9	Tharatip Sridee	Thailand	24.950	25.425	24.250	24.150	98.775
10	Ainura Sharhembieva	Kyrgyzstan	23.750	23.800	24.250	24.300	96.100
11	Ku Ni-chen	Chinese Taipei	24.800	23.700	23.850	23.500	95.850
12	Temfah Krisanayuth	Thailand	23.300	23.350	23.250	22.900	92.800
13	Kung Yun	Chinese Taipei	22.650	22.600	23.950	21.550	90.750
14	Dinda Defriana	Indonesia	20.500	19.250	19.950	20.050	79.750
15	Carlin Agustia	Indonesia	19.350	20.000	18.625	18.800	76.775

=== Individual Hoop ===
Rank	Gymnast	Nation	Score
1st place, gold medalist(s)	Anna Alyabyeva	Kazakhstan	28.300
2nd place, silver medalist(s)	Deng Senyue	China	27.500
3rd place, bronze medalist(s)	Ulyana Trofimova	Uzbekistan	27.375
4	Yuria Onuki	Japan	26.250
5	Marina Petrakova	Kazakhstan	26.000
6	Zamirajon Sanokulova	Uzbekistan	25.700
7	Peng Linyi	China	25.300
8	Runa Yamaguchi	Japan	25.000

=== Individual Ball ===
Rank	Gymnast	Nation	Score
1st place, gold medalist(s)	Anna Alyabyeva	Kazakhstan	28.550
2nd place, silver medalist(s)	Deng Senyue	China	27.700
3rd place, bronze medalist(s)	Runa Yamaguchi	Japan	27.050
4	Marina Petrakova	Kazakhstan	26.600
5	Djamila Rahmatova	Uzbekistan	26.450
6	Ulyana Trofimova	Uzbekistan	26.100
7	Yuria Onuki	Japan	26.050
8	Ainura Sharhembieva	Kyrgyzstan	25.350

=== Individual Clubs ===
Rank	Gymnast	Nation	Score
1st place, gold medalist(s)	Marina Petrakova	Kazakhstan	27.450
2nd place, silver medalist(s)	Djamila Rahmatova	Uzbekistan	26.575
3rd place, bronze medalist(s)	Anna Alyabyeva	Kazakhstan	26.500
4	Deng Senyue	China	26.400
5	Runa Yamaguchi	Japan	26.150
6	Yuria Onuki	Japan	25.800
7	Peng Linyi	China	25.800
8	Ulyana Trofimova	Uzbekistan	25.600

=== Individual Ribbon ===
Rank	Gymnast	Nation	Score
1st place, gold medalist(s)	Anna Alyabyeva	Kazakhstan	28.800
2nd place, silver medalist(s)	Ulyana Trofimova	Uzbekistan	28.100
3rd place, bronze medalist(s)	Marina Petrakova	Kazakhstan	27.300
4	Runa Yamaguchi	Japan	27.050
5	Deng Senyue	China	26.900
6	Yuria Onuki	Japan	26.100
7	Djamila Rahmatova	Uzbekistan	25.500
8	Peng Linyi	China	25.050
