= 1994 Asian Acrobatic Gymnastics Championships =

International gymnastics competition

The 1994 Asian Acrobatic Gymnastics Championships were the second edition of the Asian Acrobatic Gymnastics Championships, and were held in Shenzhen, China, in April 1994.

== Medal summary ==
Event	Gold	Silver	Bronze
Women's group	China	Unknown	Unknown
