= 1998 Asian Acrobatic Gymnastics Championships =

International gymnastics competition

The 1998 Asian Acrobatic Gymnastics Championships were the fourth edition of the Asian Acrobatic Gymnastics Championships, and were held in Kazakhstan, in June 1998.

== Medal summary ==
Event	Gold	Silver	Bronze
Women's group	China	Unknown	Unknown
