= 1992 Asian Acrobatic Gymnastics Championships =

International gymnastics competition

The 1992 Asian Acrobatic Gymnastics Championships were the first edition of the Asian Acrobatic Gymnastics Championships, and were held in Hong Kong, from December 11 to 13, 1992.

== Participant nations ==
- China
- Hong Kong
- Japan
- South Korea

== Medal summary ==
Event	Gold	Silver	Bronze
Women's tumbling	Unknown	Hong Kong	Unknown
Mixed pair	China	Unknown	Unknown
