= Double Ninth Festival =

Traditional Chinese holiday

Double Ninth Festival Chung Yeung Festival
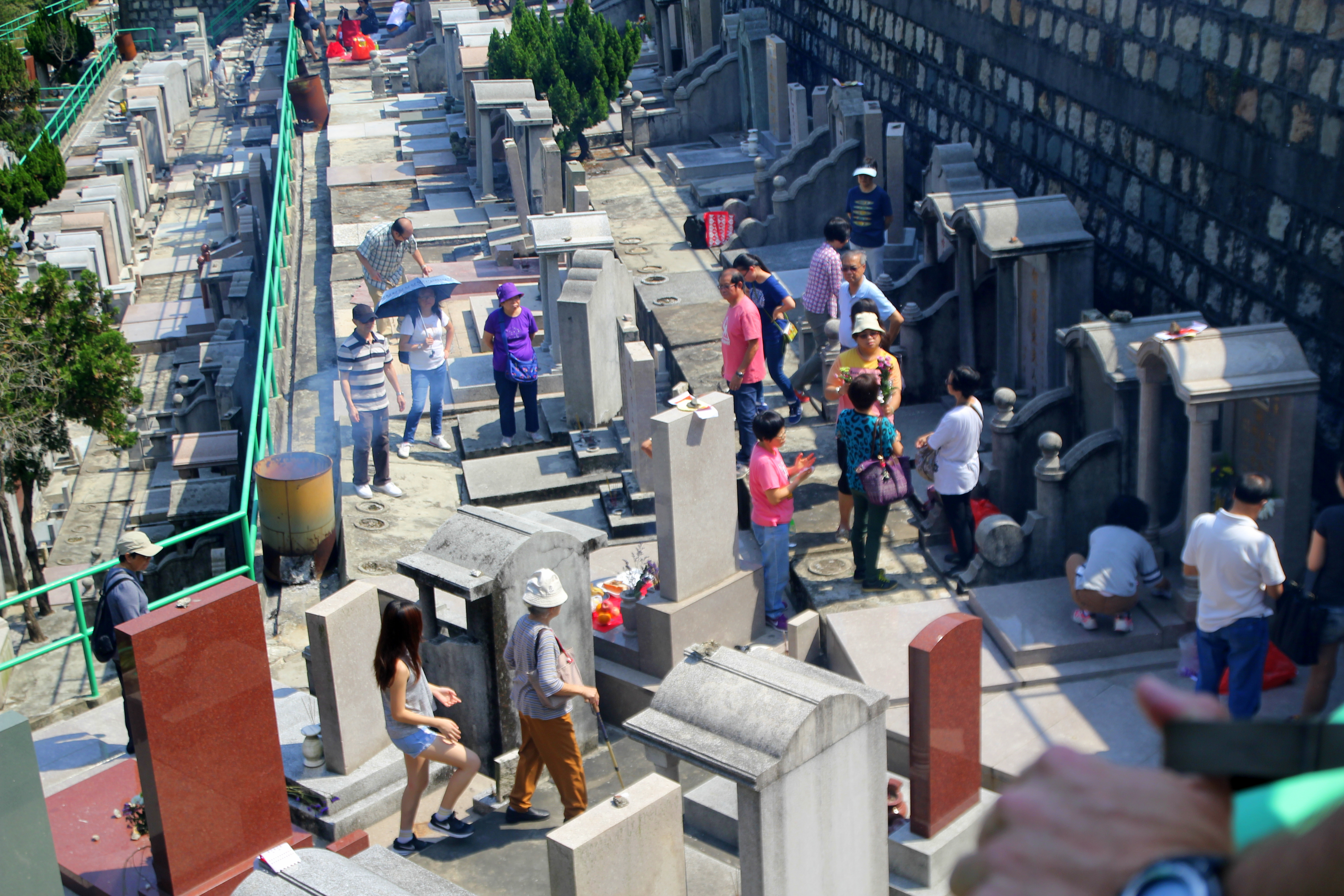
- Chai Wan Cemetery, Hong Kong, 2015
- Observed by: Chinese, Japanese, Koreans
- Date: 9th day of the 9th lunisolar month
- 2025 date: 29 October
- 2026 date: 18 October
- 2027 date: 8 October
- 2028 date: 26 October
- Frequency: Annual

Double Ninth Festival

Chinese name
- Traditional Chinese: 重陽節
- Simplified Chinese: 重阳节
Transcriptions
Standard Mandarin
- Hanyu Pinyin: Chóngyáng jié
- Wade–Giles: Ch'ung^{2}-yang^{2} chieh^{2}
- IPA: [ʈʂʰʊ̌ŋ.jǎŋ tɕjě]
Wu
- Suzhounese: Zon^{2} yan^{2} tsiq^{7}
Yue: Cantonese
- Yale Romanization: Chùhng-yèuhng jit
- Jyutping: Cung^{4}-joeng^{4} zit^{3}
Southern Min
- Hokkien POJ: Tiông-iông-choeh/cheh

Korean name
- Hangul: 중양절
- Hanja: 重陽節
Transcriptions
- Revised Romanization: Jungyangjeol

Japanese name
- Kanji: 重陽の節句
Transcriptions
- Revised Hepburn: Chōyō no Sekku

Chrysanthemum Festival

Japanese name
- Kanji: 菊の節句
Transcriptions
- Revised Hepburn: Kiku no Sekku

The Double Ninth Festival is a traditional Chinese holiday observed on the ninth day of the ninth month in the Chinese calendar. It is a statutory public holiday in Hong Kong (as Chung Yeung Festival) and Macau, and is observed in several East Asian countries. According to historian Wu Jun, it dates back to the Eastern Han dynasty (25–220 AD).

According to the I Ching, nine is a yang number; the ninth day of the ninth month in the Chinese calendar (or double nine) has extra yang (a traditional Chinese spiritual concept) and is thus an auspicious date. Hence, the day is also called Double Yang Festival (重陽節). It is customary to climb a mountain, drink chrysanthemum liquor, and wear the zhuyu (茱萸) plant (Cornus officinalis). Both chrysanthemum and zhuyu are considered to have cleansing qualities and are used on other occasions to air out houses and cure illnesses.

On this holiday, some Chinese also visit the graves of their ancestors to pay their respects. In Hong Kong and Macau, whole extended families head to ancestral graves to clean them, repaint inscriptions and lay out food offerings such as roast suckling pig and fruit, which are then eaten (after the spirits have consumed the spiritual element of the food). Chongyang cake is also popular and incense sticks are burned during the holiday.

== Origin ==
The origins of the festival date back as early as the Warring States period.

According to legend, the traditions of hiking and drinking chrysanthemum wine on this day began with the Han dynasty man Fei Changfang and his disciple Huan Jing. One year, Fei advised Huan to bring chrysanthemum wine and food and climb a mountain with his family on the ninth day of the ninth month. Huan followed his master's instructions, and when he returned home he found that his livestock had all suddenly died; if he had not climbed the mountain as instructed, the same would have happened to him and his family.

An alternative origin story involves intrigue in the imperial court of Emperor Gaozu of Han. As part of Empress Lü's jealous plot against Consort Qi, the latter's maid was forced out of the imperial palace. The maid, surnamed Jia (賈; 贾), told the common people that in the palace it was customary to wear dogwood and drink chrysanthemum wine on the ninth day of the ninth month, and these customs spread more widely.

Double Ninth may have originated as a day to drive away danger, but like the Chinese New Year, over time, it became a day of celebration. In contemporary times, it is an occasion for hiking and chrysanthemum appreciation. Other activities include flying kites, making flower cakes, and welcoming married daughters back home for visiting.

The festival is also an opportunity to care for and appreciate the elderly, and to that end, Taiwan has rededicated the holiday as Senior Citizens' Day.

Stores sell rice cakes (糕 "gāo", a homophone for height 高) with mini colorful flags to represent zhuyu. Most people drink chrysanthemum tea, while a few traditionalists drink homemade chrysanthemum wine. Children learn poems about chrysanthemums and many localities host chrysanthemum exhibits. Mountain climbing races are also popular; winners get to wear a wreath made of zhuyu.

== Outside China ==
=== Japan ===
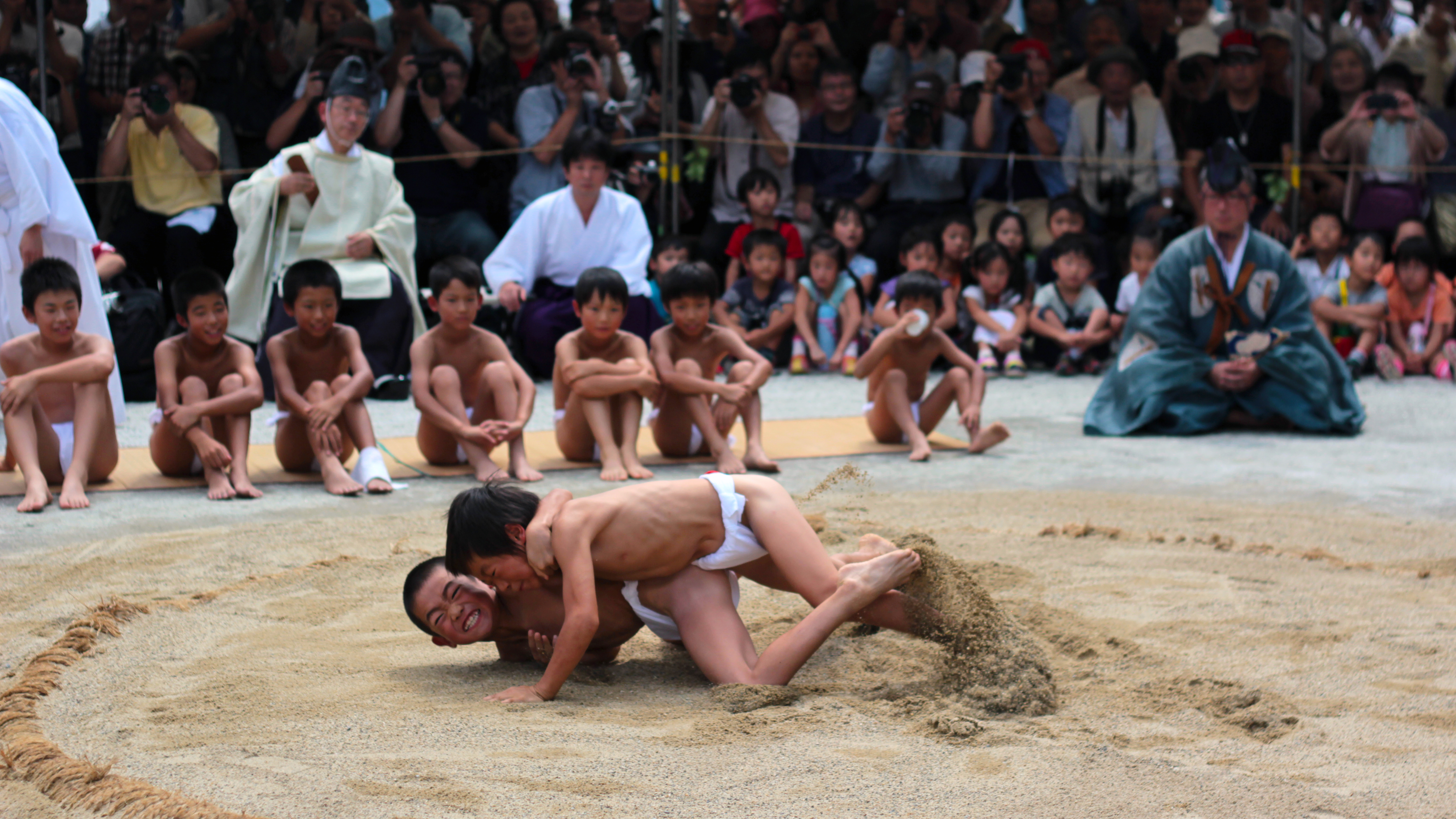
Karasu-zumo (literally 'crow sumo'), is a part of the festivities held on September 9 at Kamigamo Shrine in Kyoto

In Japan, the festival is known as Chōyō but also as the Chrysanthemum Festival (菊の節句, Kiku no Sekku) and it is one of Japan's five sacred ancient festivals (sekku). It is most commonly celebrated on the 9th day of the 9th month according to the Gregorian calendar rather than the lunisolar calendar, i.e. on September 9. It is celebrated at both Shinto shrines and Buddhist temples. The festival is celebrated in the wish for the longevity of one's life and is observed by drinking chrysanthemum sake and eating dishes such as chestnut rice (kuri-gohan) and chestnuts with glutinous rice (kuri-mochi).

=== Korea ===
In Korea, the festival is known as Jungyangjeol (중양절; 重陽節), and it is celebrated on the 9th day of the 9th month. Koreans would consume chrysanthemum leaves in pancakes. As the festival is meant to celebrate and cultivate good health, outdoor activities such as carrying dogwood, climbing hills or mountains for picnics, and gazing at chrysanthemum blossoms are carried out.

=== Taiwan ===
Double Ninth Day is not a major festival in Taiwan, but the country retains some of the Double Ninth Day practices once found in China. For some families, the day (like New Year's Eve and Qingming Festival) offers the opportunity to venerate distant ancestors who are not otherwise honoured on their birthdays, but this is often done on the weekend before if Double Ninth falls on a weekday. In 1966, Taiwan rededicated the holiday as Senior Citizens' Day, and local governments often make small cash payments to senior citizens (Chinese: 敬老禮金; pinyin: jìnglǎo lǐjīn) for the occasion, but the holiday is otherwise not widely observed.

== Gallery ==
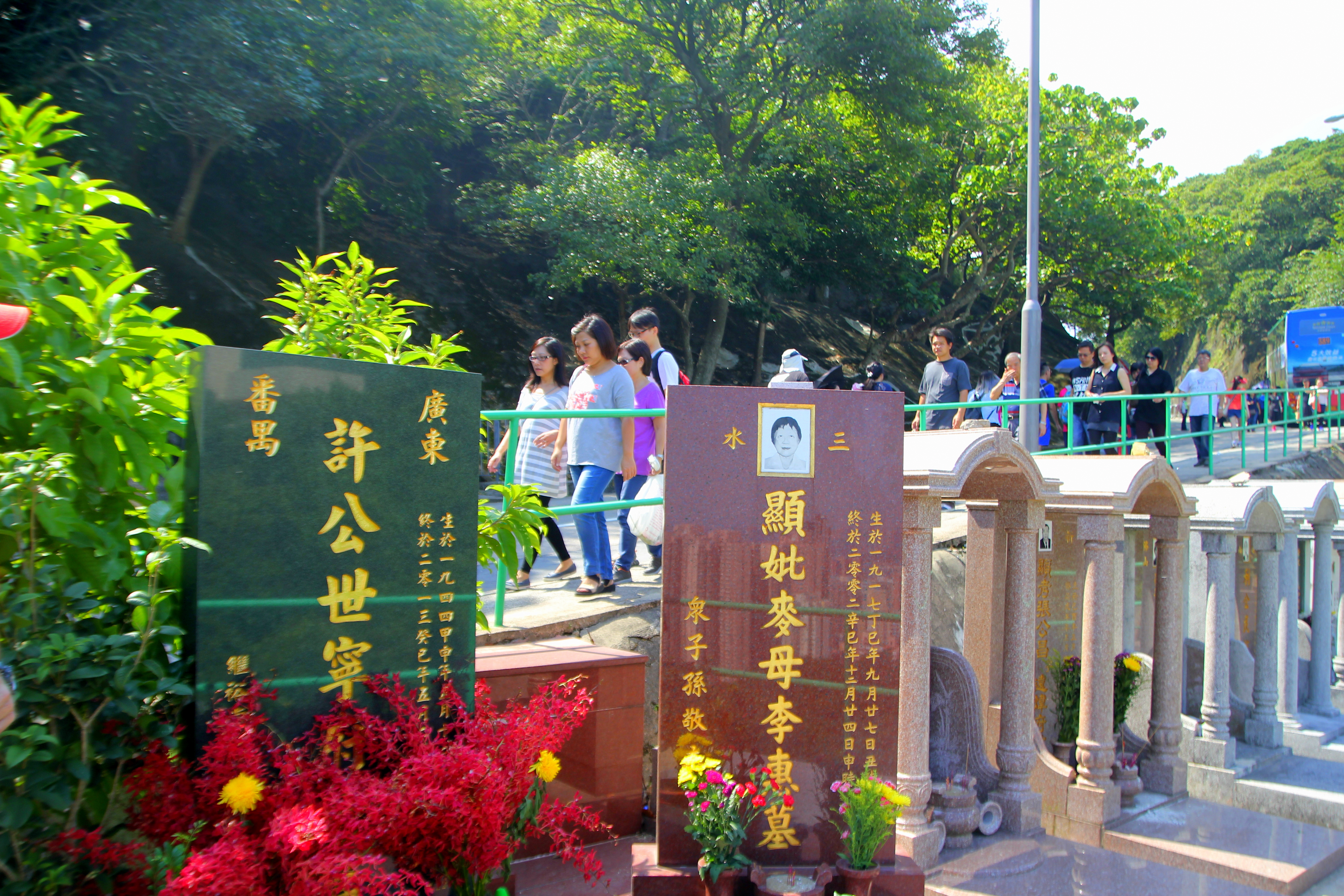
Participants arrive at the Chai Wan Cemetery, Hong Kong, 2015

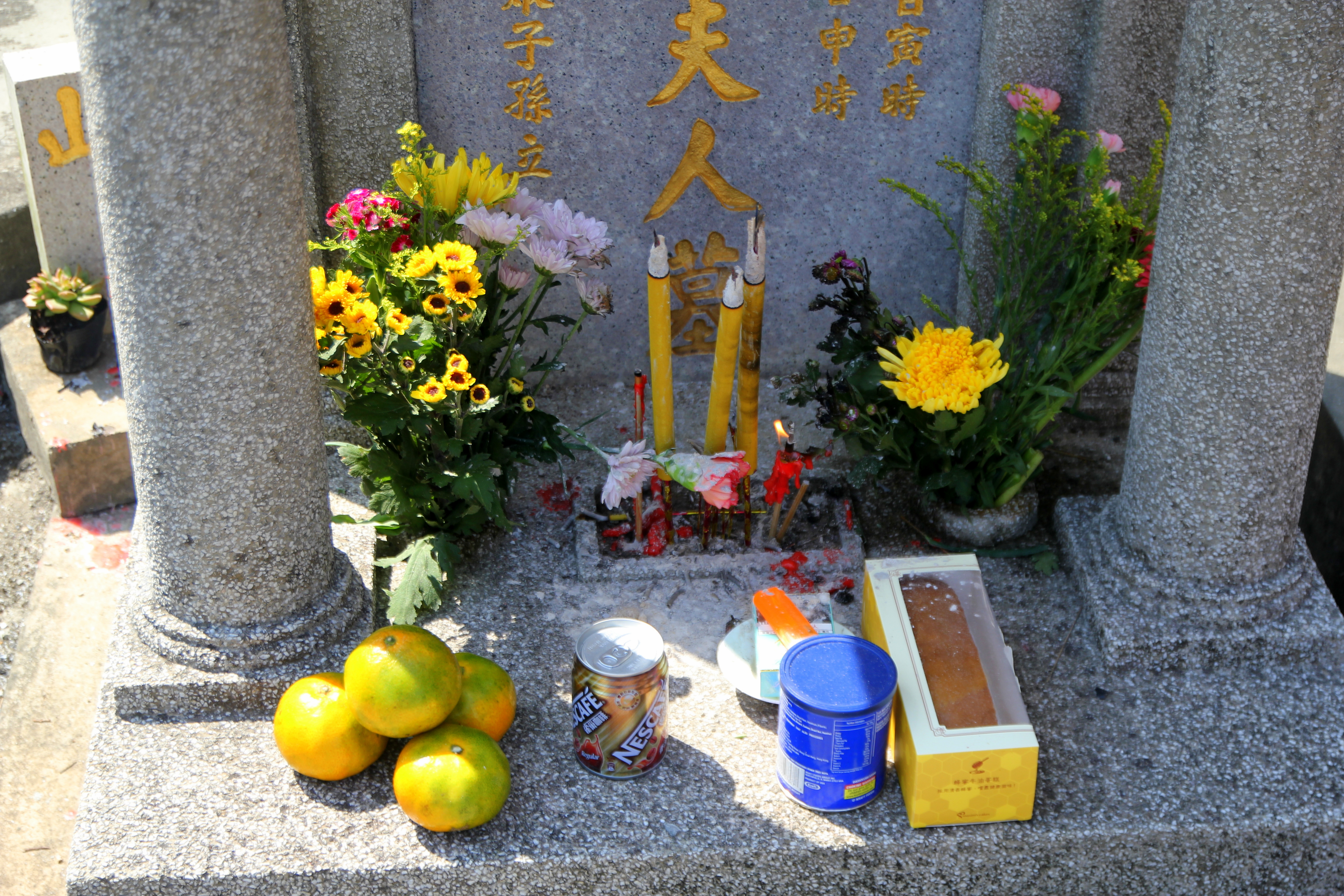
Chai Wan Cemetery Hong Kong, 2015

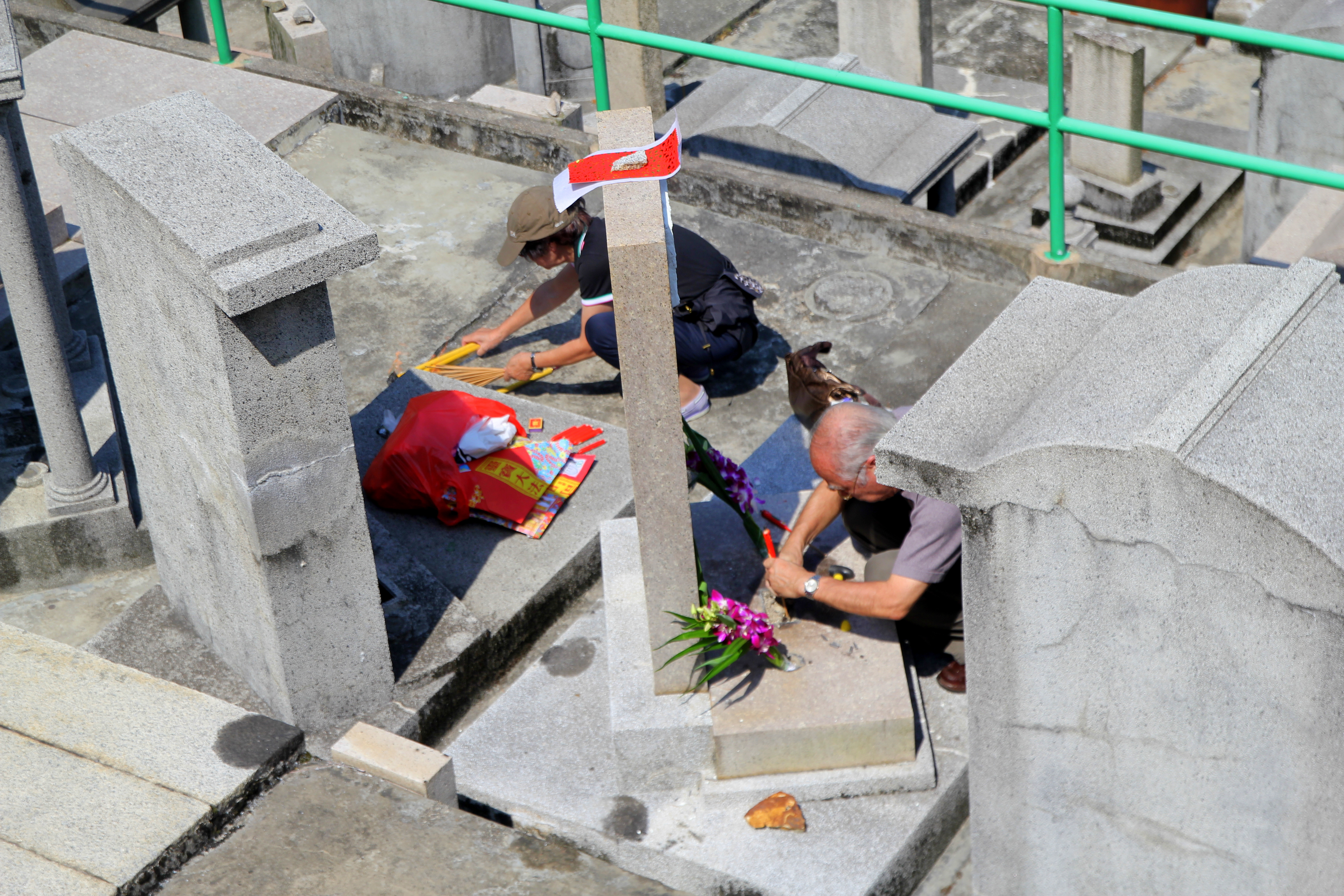
Chai Wan Cemetery, Hong Kong, 2015

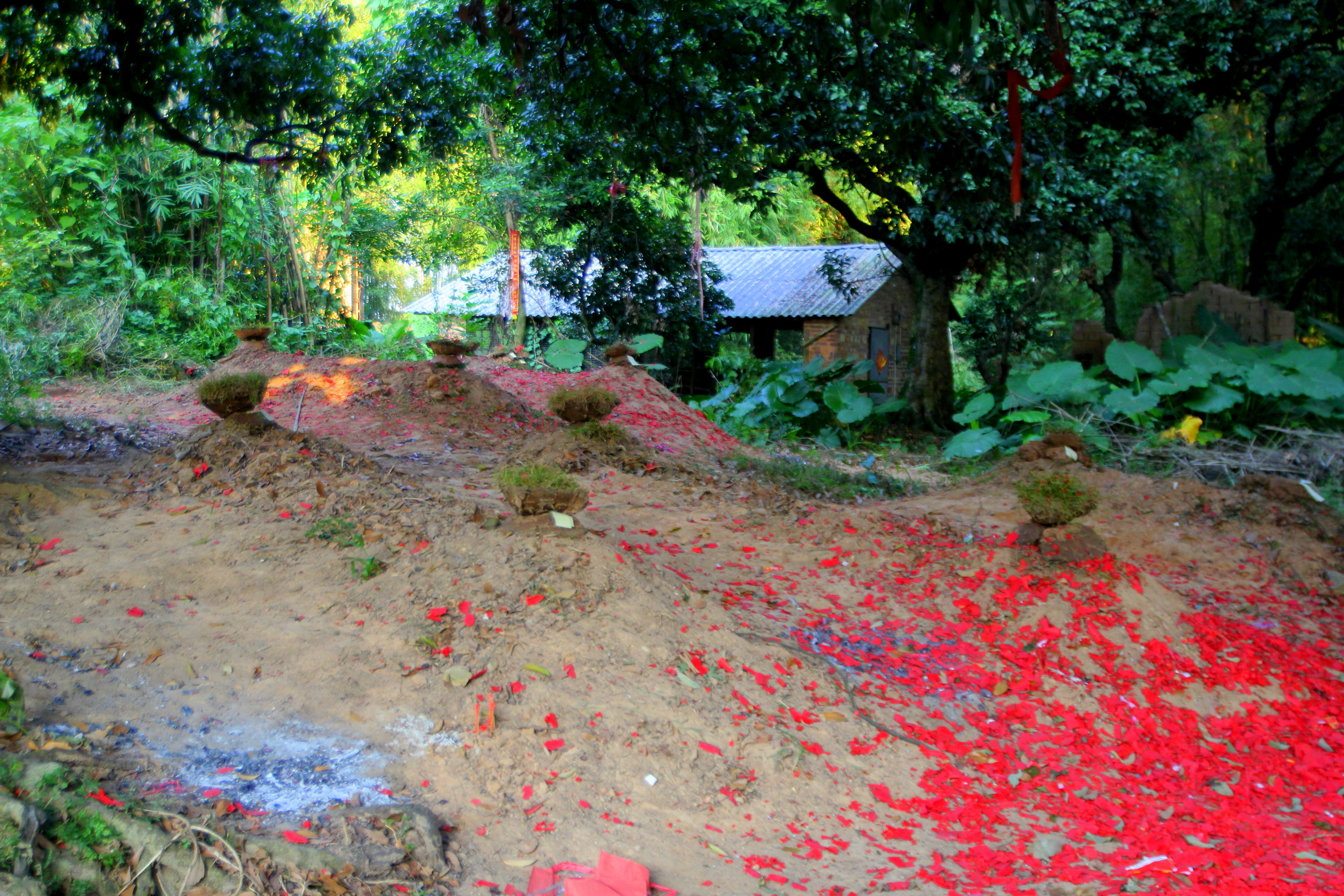
Xian Tang Village, Dongguan, China, 2015

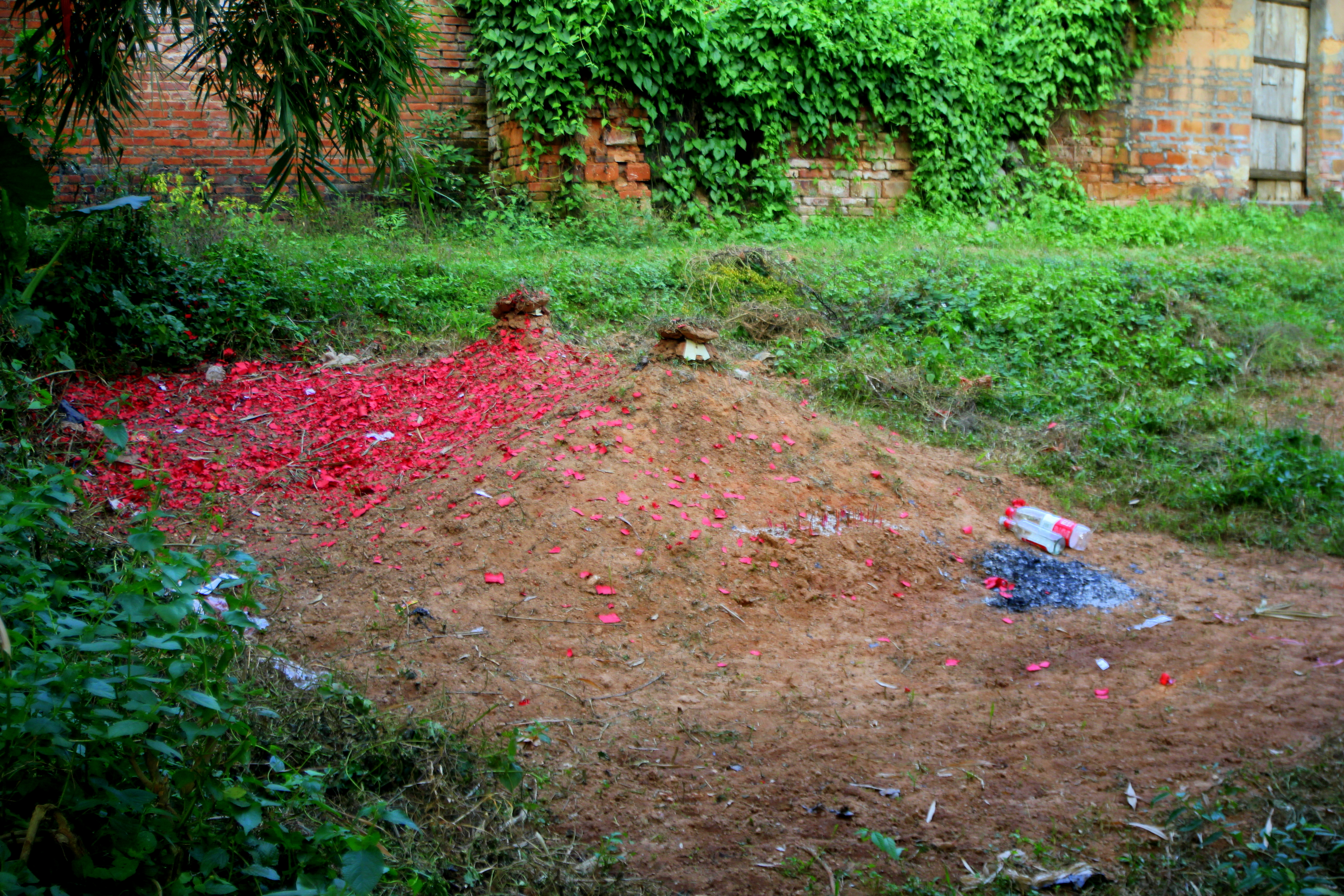
Xian Tang Village, Dongguan, China, 2015

== See also ==
- Double Seventh Festival
- Qingming Festival, a day to visit and clean up the cemeteries
- Curse of the Golden Flower, a Chinese film in which the plot takes place around the Chrysanthemum Festival.
