= 2024 Asian Trampoline Gymnastics Championships =

International gymnastics competition

The 2024 Asian Trampoline Gymnastics Championships were held in Hong Kong, China, from May 11 to 12, 2024.

== Participating nations ==
- China
- Chinese Taipei
- Hong Kong
- India
- Iran
- Japan
- Jordan
- Kazakhstan
- Philippines
- Tajikistan
- Uzbekistan

== Medal winners ==
Event	Gold	Silver	Bronze
Senior men	Li Yuming; China	Yasufumi Mita; Japan	Fu Weijian; China
Senior women	Zhang Xinxin; China	Cao Yunzhu; China	Amane Katsumori; Japan
Junior men	Yu Weijie; China	Jumpei Takagi; Japan	Sardor Mukhammadiev; Uzbekistan
Junior women	Zhang Yu; China	Mo Huixi; China	Yuki Masutani; Japan
