= 2012 Asian Aerobic Gymnastics Championships =

International gymnastics competition

The 2012 Asian Aerobic Gymnastics Championships were the 3rd edition of the Asian Aerobic Gymnastics Championships, and were held in Palembang Sport and Convention Center, Palembang, Indonesia from October 18 to October 19, 2012.

== Medal summary ==
Event	Gold	Silver	Bronze
Men's individual	Han Mingzhe; China	Yang Guang; China	Nguyễn Tiến Phương; Vietnam
Women's individual	Ma Chao; China	Ai Takahashi; Japan	Maho Ueda; Japan
Mixed pair	Vietnam; Vũ Bá Đông; Trần Thị Thu Hà	China; Yang Guang; Ma Chao	Indonesia; Windra Lesmana; Veronika Sibuea
Mixed pair	Vietnam; Vũ Bá Đông; Trần Thị Thu Hà	China; Yang Guang; Ma Chao	Mongolia; Ganboldyn Narankhüü; Batboldyn Gandulam
Trio	Vietnam; Nguyễn Tiến Phương; Vũ Bá Đông; Trần Thị Thu Hà	Iran; Amin Arbab; Alireza Farrokh; Reza Farrokhian	Indonesia; Tubagus Herlambang; Nur Wakhid; Sigit Budi Prasetyo

== Medal table ==
Rank	Nation	Gold	Silver	Bronze	Total
1	China (CHN)	2	2	0	4
2	Vietnam (VIE)	2	0	1	3
3	Japan (JPN)	0	1	1	2
4	Iran (IRI)	0	1	0	1
5	Indonesia (INA)	0	0	2	2
6	Mongolia (MGL)	0	0	1	1
Totals (6 entries)		4	4	5	13

== Participating nations ==
36 athletes from 9 nations competed.

- China (3)
- Hong Kong (3)
- India (8)
- Indonesia (7)
- Iran (3)
- Japan (3)
- Mongolia (3)
- Philippines (3)
- Vietnam (3)
