= 1996 Asian Acrobatic Gymnastics Championships =

International gymnastics competition

The 1996 Asian Acrobatic Gymnastics Championships were the third edition of the Asian Acrobatic Gymnastics Championships, and were held in Kawasaki, Japan, in December 1996.

== Medal summary ==
Event	Gold	Silver	Bronze
Men's group	China	Unknown	Unknown
