= Aliya Assymova =

Kazakhstani rhythmic gymnast (born 1997)

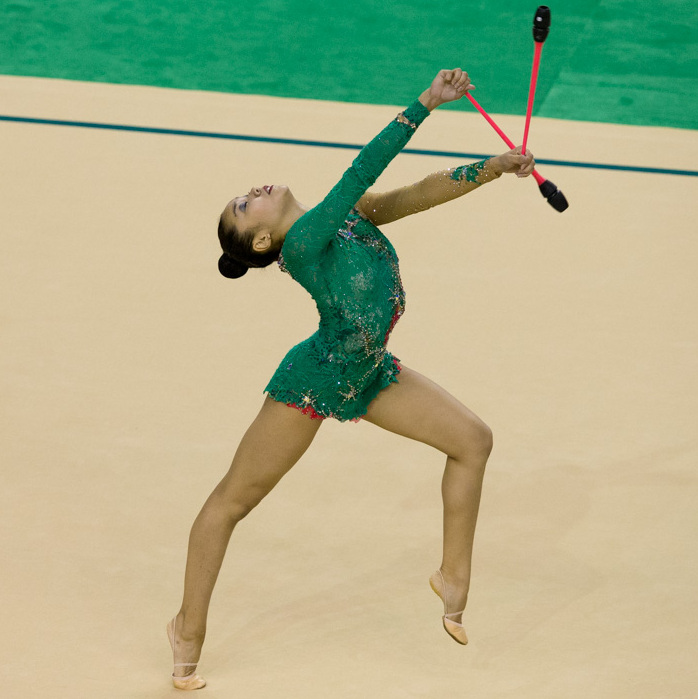

Personal information
- Born: 16 December 1997 (age 28) Taldykorgan, Kazakhstan

Gymnastics career
- Discipline: Rhythmic gymnastics
- Country represented: Kazakhstan (2011)
- Gym: School of Olympic Reserve
- Head coach: Aliya Yusupova
- Assistant coach: Svetlana Krasnikova
Medal record
Rhythmic Gymnastics
Representing Kazakhstan
Asian Games
Bronze medal – third place	2014 Incheon	Team
Asian Championships
Bronze medal – third place	2015 Jecheon	Team

Aliya Assymova (Kazakh: Әлия Асымова, Äliia Asymova; Russian: Алия Асымова, born 16 December 1997) is a Kazakhstani former individual rhythmic gymnast.

== Career ==
On the junior level, Assymova was the 2011 Asian Championships all-around champion. She also won medals in all four event finals, including two golds in hoop and ribbon. In 2012, she came in first place in her age group at the Kazakhstan National Championships.

Assymova debuted as a senior in the 2013 season and represented her nation at international competitions. She competed in three World Championships (2013 in Kyiv, 2014 in İzmir and 2015 in Stuttgart). Assymova won a bronze in team event at the 2014 Asian Games and at the 2015 Asian Championships.

She won a bronze medal in the ball final at the 2014 Grand Prix Berlin.

In 2016, she competed at three World Cup stages before competing at the 2016 Gymnastics Olympic Test Event; she placed 18th in the qualification round and did not qualify for the Olympics. This was her last international competition. She later became a coach.
