= 2014 Asian Aerobic Gymnastics Championships =

International gymnastics competition

The 2014 Asian Aerobic Gymnastics Championships were the fourth edition of the Asian Aerobic Gymnastics Championships, and were held in Gangwon, South Korea from November 19 to November 21, 2014.

== Medal summary ==
Event	Gold	Silver	Bronze
Men's individual	Bangda Hu; China	Han-Jin Kim; South Korea	Phatcharapong Photjanakosri; Thailand
Women's individual	Yu Yangyang; China	Yeon-Sun Park; South Korea	Mana Kodama; Japan
Women's individual	Yu Yangyang; China	Yeon-Sun Park; South Korea	Sang-A Choi; South Korea
Mixed pair	China	South Korea	South Korea
Trio	South Korea	China	South Korea
Group	China	South Korea	South Korea
Dance	South Korea	South Korea	Mongolia
Step	Mongolia	South Korea	South Korea

== Medal table ==
Rank	Nation	Gold	Silver	Bronze	Total
1	China (CHN)	4	1	0	5
2	South Korea (KOR)	2	6	5	13
3	Mongolia (MGL)	1	0	1	2
4	Japan (JPN)	0	0	1	1
4	Thailand (THA)	0	0	1	1
Totals (5 entries)		7	7	8	22
