= 2017 Asian Acrobatic Gymnastics Championships =

The 2017 Asian Acrobatic Gymnastics Championships were the 10th edition of the Asian Acrobatic Gymnastics Championships, and were held in Almaty, Kazakhstan from September 17 to 19, 2017.

== Medal summary ==
Event	Gold	Silver	Bronze
Women's pair	North Korea	Uzbekistan	—
Men's pair	North Korea	Kazakhstan	Uzbekistan
Mixed pair	Kazakhstan	China	Hong Kong
Women's group	Kazakhstan	—	—
Men's group	China	Uzbekistan	India

== Medal table ==
Rank	Nation	Gold	Silver	Bronze	Total
1	Kazakhstan (KAZ)	2	1	0	3
2	North Korea (PRK)	2	0	0	2
3	China (CHN)	1	1	0	2
4	Uzbekistan (UZB)	0	2	1	3
5	Hong Kong (HKG)	0	0	1	1
5	India (IND)	0	0	1	1
Totals (6 entries)		5	4	3	12
