= 2023 Asian Aerobic Gymnastics Championships =

Gymnastics championship in Ulaanbaatar, Mongolia

The 2023 Asian Aerobic Gymnastics Championships were held in Ulaanbaatar, Mongolia from September 14 to 19, 2023.

== Medal summary ==
Event	Gold	Silver	Bronze
Men's individual	Wei Lian-Jun; Chinese Taipei	The Gia Nam Phan; Vietnam	Shin Jin-ho; South Korea
Women's individual	Koh Eun-byeol; South Korea	Sous Sreypov; Cambodia	Batchuluun Enkhtugs; Mongolia
Mixed pair	Vietnam	Vietnam	South Korea
Trio	Cambodia	South Korea	Vietnam
Group	Vietnam	South Korea	Mongolia
Dance	Mongolia	Vietnam	India

== Medal table ==
Rank	Nation	Gold	Silver	Bronze	Total
1	Vietnam (VIE)	2	3	1	6
2	Cambodia (CAM)	1	1	0	2
3	Mongolia (MGL)	1	0	2	3
4	Chinese Taipei (TPE)	1	0	0	1
5	South Korea (KOR)	0	3	2	5
6	India (IND)	0	0	1	1
Totals (6 entries)		5	7	6	18
