= 2010 Asian Acrobatic Gymnastics Championships =

The 2010 Asian Acrobatic Gymnastics Championships were the seventh edition of the Asian Acrobatic Gymnastics Championships, and were held in Almaty, Kazakhstan from May 25 to May 30, 2010.

== Medal summary ==
Event	Gold	Silver	Bronze
Women's pair	Kazakhstan	Kyrgyzstan	Kazakhstan
Men's pair	Kazakhstan	Uzbekistan	Tajikistan
Mixed pair	Kazakhstan	Uzbekistan	Kazakhstan
Women's group	Kazakhstan	Uzbekistan	Kazakhstan
Men's group	Kazakhstan	Kyrgyzstan	Kazakhstan

== Medal table ==
Rank	Nation	Gold	Silver	Bronze	Total
1	Kazakhstan (KAZ)	5	0	4	9
2	Uzbekistan (UZB)	0	3	0	3
3	Kyrgyzstan (KGZ)	0	2	0	2
4	Tajikistan (TJK)	0	0	1	1
Totals (4 entries)		5	5	5	15
