= 2000 Asian Acrobatic Gymnastics Championships =

International gymnastics competition

The 2000 Asian Acrobatic Gymnastics Championships were the fifth edition of the Asian Acrobatic Gymnastics Championships, and were held in Kazakhstan, in September 2000.

== Medal summary ==
Event	Gold	Silver	Bronze
Women's pair	China	Unknown	Unknown
