= 2010 Asian Aerobic Gymnastics Championships =

International gymnastics competition

The 2010 Asian Aerobic Gymnastics Championships were the second edition of the Asian Aerobic Gymnastics Championships, and were held in Ho Chi Minh City, Vietnam from December 16 to December 18, 2010.

== Participating nations ==
- Cambodia
- China
- Hong Kong
- India
- Iran
- Japan
- South Korea
- Mongolia
- Philippines
- Sri Lanka
- Vietnam

== Senior events ==
- Men's individual
- Women's individual
- Mixed pair
- Trio
- Group

== Medal table ==
Rank	Nation	Gold	Silver	Bronze	Total
1	China (CHN)	3	0	0	3
2	South Korea (KOR)	2	3	2	7
3	Vietnam (VIE)	0	1	3	4
4	Japan (JPN)	0	1	0	1
Totals (4 entries)		5	5	5	15
