= 2024 Asian Aerobic Gymnastics Championships =

Gymnastics championship in Hanoi, Vietnam

The 2024 Asian Aerobic Gymnastics Championships were held in Hanoi, Vietnam, from June 8 to 10, 2024.

== Medal summary ==
Event	Gold	Silver	Bronze
Men's individual	Nguyễn Chế Thanh; Vietnam	Chanokpon Jiumsukjai; Thailand	Phan Thế Gia Hiển; Vietnam
Women's individual	Kishibe Mahiro; Japan	Chawisa Intakul; Thailand	Trương Ngọc Diễm Hằng; Vietnam
Mixed pair	Thailand	Vietnam	Japan
Trio	Vietnam	Japan	Vietnam
Group	Vietnam	Japan	Cambodia
Dance	Vietnam	Mongolia	Thailand

== Medal table ==
Rank	Nation	Gold	Silver	Bronze	Total
1	Vietnam (VIE)	4	1	3	8
2	Japan (JPN)	1	2	1	4
2	Thailand (THA)	1	2	1	4
4	Mongolia (MGL)	0	1	0	1
5	Cambodia (CAM)	0	0	1	1
Totals (5 entries)		6	6	6	18
