= Linan, Fujian =

Linan 鲤南镇
- Town
- Location in Fujian Linan (China)
- Coordinates: 25°20′58″N 118°41′51″E
- Country: People's Republic of China
- Province: Fujian
- Prefecture-level city: Putian
- County: Xianyou
- Time zone: UTC+8 (China Standard)

Linan (simplified Chinese: 鲤南; traditional Chinese: 鯉南; pinyin: Lǐnán) is a town in Putian, southern Fujian Province, China. It is under the administration of Xianyou County, and controls 2 neighbourhood committees and 16 villages.
