= Asian Gymnastics Championships =

Biennial international sporting event

The Asian Gymnastic Union (AGU) organizes Asian Gymnastics Championships for each of the FIG gymnastic disciplines: men's and women's artistic gymnastics, rhythmic gymnastics, acrobatic gymnastics, aerobic gymnastics and trampoline gymnastics. This article lists only the senior editions of the Asian Gymnastics Championships, in which competitors must be over 16 years of age. Specific editions of the Asian Championships also exist for junior athletes; for example, the first edition of the Junior Asian Artistic Gymnastics Championships was held in 1971, but the first senior edition of the tournament was only held in 1996. Similarly, Junior Asian Trampoline Championships were held in 2010 and 2012, but only in 2014 the Asian Gymnastics Union held a senior tournament in conjunction with the junior championships for the first time.

== Disciplines ==
=== Acrobatic ===
Edition	Year	Venue	Date	Ref.
1	1992	Hong Kong	December 11–13, 1992	
2	1994	Shenzhen, China	April 1994	
3	1996	Kawasaki, Japan	December 1996	
4	1998	Kazakhstan	June 1998	
5	2000	Kazakhstan	September 2000	
6	2007	Almaty, Kazakhstan	July 4–9, 2007	
7	2010	Almaty, Kazakhstan	May 27–29, 2010	
8	2013	Pavlodar, Kazakhstan	April 27–29, 2013	
9	2015	Linan, China	September 17–19, 2015	
10	2017	Almaty, Kazakhstan	September 17–19, 2017	
11	2019	Tashkent, Uzbekistan	October 10–12, 2019	
12	2022	Pavlodar, Kazakhstan	September 23–28, 2022	
13	2023	Tashkent, Uzbekistan	October 18–20, 2023	

=== Aerobic ===
Edition	Year	Venue	Date	Ref.
1	2009	Bangkok, Thailand	March 27–29, 2009	
2	2010	Ho Chi Minh City, Vietnam	December 16–18, 2010	
3	2012	Palembang, Indonesia	October 18–19, 2012	
4	2014	Hoengseong, South Korea	November 19–21, 2014	
5	2015	Ho Chi Minh City, Vietnam	December 11–13, 2015	
6	2017	Ulaanbaatar, Mongolia	September 13–18, 2017	
7	2022	Pattaya, Thailand	September 3–5, 2022	
8	2023	Ulaanbaatar, Mongolia	September 14–19, 2023	
9	2024	Hanoi, Vietnam	June 8–10, 2024	

=== Artistic ===
==== Editions ====
Edition	Year	Venue	Date	Ref.
1	1996	Changsha, China	September 1996	
2	2003	Guangzhou, China	November 22–25, 2003	
3	2006	Surat, India	July 30–August 3, 2006	
4	2008	Doha, Qatar	November 15–18, 2008	
5	2012	Putian, China	November 11–14, 2012	
6	2015	Hiroshima, Japan	July 31–August 2, 2015	
7	2017	Bangkok, Thailand	May 18–21, 2017	
8	2019	Ulaanbaatar, Mongolia	June 19–22, 2019	
9	2022	Doha, Qatar	June 15–18, 2022	
10	2023	Singapore	June 10–18, 2023	
11	2024 (Men)	Tashkent, Uzbekistan	May 16–19, 2024	
11	2024 (Women)	Tashkent, Uzbekistan	May 24–26, 2024	
12	2025 (Men)	Jecheon, South Korea	June 5–8, 2025	
12	2025 (Women)	Jecheon, South Korea	June 12–15, 2025	
13	2026 (Men)	Zunyi, China	June 18–21, 2026	
13	2026 (Women)	Zunyi, China	June 25–28, 2026	

==== All-time medal table ====
1996–2025; Senior events
Rank	Nation	Gold	Silver	Bronze	Total
1	China (CHN)	93	54	33	180
2	Japan (JPN)	25	36	25	86
3	Philippines (PHI)	12	3	8	23
4	Kazakhstan (KAZ)	10	8	9	27
5	North Korea (PRK)	9	19	17	45
6	South Korea (KOR)	7	17	29	53
7	Chinese Taipei (TPE)	4	4	11	19
8	Vietnam (VIE)	2	3	6	11
9	Jordan (JOR)	2	1	2	5
10	Hong Kong (HKG)	1	4	2	7
11	Iran (IRI)	1	2	5	8
12	India (IND)	1	0	4	5
13	Uzbekistan (UZB)	0	6	5	11
14	Indonesia (INA)	0	1	0	1
15	Yemen (YEM)	0	0	2	2
16	Malaysia (MAS)	0	0	1	1
16	Singapore (SGP)	0	0	1	1
16	Syria (SYR)	0	0	1	1
16	Thailand (THA)	0	0	1	1
Totals (19 entries)		167	158	162	487

==== Best results by event and nation ====
Event		(China) CHN	(Hong Kong) HKG	(Indonesia) INA	(India) IND	(Iran) IRI	(Jordan) JOR	(Japan) JPN	(Kazakhstan) KAZ	(South Korea) KOR	(Malaysia) MAS	(Philippines) PHI	(North Korea) PRK	(Singapore) SGP	(Syria) SYR	(Thailand) THA	(Chinese Taipei) TPE	(Uzbekistan) UZB	(Vietnam) VIE	(Yemen) YEM
M A G
M A G	Team	1st place, gold medalist(s)						1st place, gold medalist(s)	3rd place, bronze medalist(s)	2nd place, silver medalist(s)			3rd place, bronze medalist(s)				3rd place, bronze medalist(s)	2nd place, silver medalist(s)		
M A G	Individual all-around	1st place, gold medalist(s)						1st place, gold medalist(s)	2nd place, silver medalist(s)	3rd place, bronze medalist(s)		1st place, gold medalist(s)					1st place, gold medalist(s)	3rd place, bronze medalist(s)		
M A G	Floor exercise	1st place, gold medalist(s)			3rd place, bronze medalist(s)			1st place, gold medalist(s)	1st place, gold medalist(s)	1st place, gold medalist(s)		1st place, gold medalist(s)	1st place, gold medalist(s)		3rd place, bronze medalist(s)			3rd place, bronze medalist(s)		3rd place, bronze medalist(s)
M A G	Pommel horse	1st place, gold medalist(s)				2nd place, silver medalist(s)	1st place, gold medalist(s)	1st place, gold medalist(s)	1st place, gold medalist(s)	1st place, gold medalist(s)			1st place, gold medalist(s)				1st place, gold medalist(s)	2nd place, silver medalist(s)		
M A G	Still rings	1st place, gold medalist(s)	2nd place, silver medalist(s)			2nd place, silver medalist(s)	3rd place, bronze medalist(s)	1st place, gold medalist(s)	1st place, gold medalist(s)				1st place, gold medalist(s)			3rd place, bronze medalist(s)	2nd place, silver medalist(s)		2nd place, silver medalist(s)	
M A G	Vault	1st place, gold medalist(s)	1st place, gold medalist(s)	2nd place, silver medalist(s)				2nd place, silver medalist(s)	1st place, gold medalist(s)	2nd place, silver medalist(s)	3rd place, bronze medalist(s)	1st place, gold medalist(s)	1st place, gold medalist(s)				3rd place, bronze medalist(s)	2nd place, silver medalist(s)	1st place, gold medalist(s)	3rd place, bronze medalist(s)
M A G	Parallel bars	1st place, gold medalist(s)						1st place, gold medalist(s)	1st place, gold medalist(s)	2nd place, silver medalist(s)		1st place, gold medalist(s)	2nd place, silver medalist(s)					3rd place, bronze medalist(s)	2nd place, silver medalist(s)	
M A G	Horizontal bar	1st place, gold medalist(s)	2nd place, silver medalist(s)					1st place, gold medalist(s)	1st place, gold medalist(s)	1st place, gold medalist(s)		3rd place, bronze medalist(s)	3rd place, bronze medalist(s)				2nd place, silver medalist(s)		3rd place, bronze medalist(s)	
W A G
W A G	Team	1st place, gold medalist(s)						1st place, gold medalist(s)		2nd place, silver medalist(s)			2nd place, silver medalist(s)	3rd place, bronze medalist(s)			3rd place, bronze medalist(s)	3rd place, bronze medalist(s)		
W A G	Individual all-around	1st place, gold medalist(s)						1st place, gold medalist(s)		3rd place, bronze medalist(s)		3rd place, bronze medalist(s)	2nd place, silver medalist(s)					3rd place, bronze medalist(s)		
W A G	Vault	1st place, gold medalist(s)	2nd place, silver medalist(s)		1st place, gold medalist(s)			2nd place, silver medalist(s)		1st place, gold medalist(s)		3rd place, bronze medalist(s)	1st place, gold medalist(s)				3rd place, bronze medalist(s)	2nd place, silver medalist(s)	1st place, gold medalist(s)	
W A G	Uneven bars	1st place, gold medalist(s)						1st place, gold medalist(s)		3rd place, bronze medalist(s)		3rd place, bronze medalist(s)	2nd place, silver medalist(s)					2nd place, silver medalist(s)		
W A G	Balance beam	1st place, gold medalist(s)						2nd place, silver medalist(s)		1st place, gold medalist(s)		3rd place, bronze medalist(s)	1st place, gold medalist(s)				1st place, gold medalist(s)			
W A G	Floor exercise	1st place, gold medalist(s)						1st place, gold medalist(s)	3rd place, bronze medalist(s)	2nd place, silver medalist(s)		1st place, gold medalist(s)	1st place, gold medalist(s)					2nd place, silver medalist(s)		

=== Rhythmic ===
Edition	Year	Venue	Date	Ref.
1	1996	Changsha, China	September 1996	
2	2004	Yangzhou, China	June 10–13, 2004	
3	2006	Surat, India	July 30–August 3, 2006	
4	2009	Astana, Kazakhstan	October 15–18, 2009	
5	2011	Astana, Kazakhstan	June 15–17, 2011	
6	2013	Tashkent, Uzbekistan	June 5–8, 2013	
7	2015	Jecheon, South Korea	June 10–13, 2015	
8	2016	Tashkent, Uzbekistan	May 8–10, 2016	
9	2017	Astana, Kazakhstan	June 24–26, 2017	
10	2018	Kuala Lumpur, Malaysia	April 29–May 2, 2018	
11	2019	Pattaya, Thailand	June 20–23, 2019	
12	2021	Tashkent, Uzbekistan	June 8–10, 2021	
13	2022	Pattaya, Thailand	June 23–26, 2022	
14	2023	Manila, Philippines	May 31–June 3, 2023	
15	2024	Tashkent, Uzbekistan	May 2-4, 2024	
16	2025	Singapore	May 16-18, 2025	
17	2026	Bishkek, Kyrgyzstan	May 23-26, 2026	

==== All-time medal table ====
1996–2026; Senior events
Rank	Nation	Gold	Silver	Bronze	Total
1	Uzbekistan (UZB)	49	35	31	115
2	Kazakhstan (KAZ)	31	34	34	99
3	China (CHN)	31	27	24	82
4	Japan (JPN)	19	31	33	83
5	South Korea (KOR)	11	11	14	36
6	Malaysia (MAS)	1	0	4	5
7	North Korea (PRK)	0	1	1	2
8	Thailand (THA)	0	0	3	3
9	Chinese Taipei (TPE)	0	0	2	2
Totals (9 entries)		142	139	146	427

Note
Complete results of the 1996 edition are not currently available. 3 gold medals, 3 silver medals and 3 bronze medals distributed at the 1996 championships are unknown at the moment.

=== Trampoline ===
Edition	Year	Location	Date	Ref.
1	2014	Chiba, Japan	June 2–4, 2014	
2	2018	Makati, Philippines	May 19–20, 2018	
3	2024	Hong Kong, China	May 11–12, 2024	

== Asian Cup ==
Since 2018, the Asian Gymnastics Union organizes Asian Gymnastics Cups in gymnastics. Similar events have been organized in different continents, such as the Americas and Europe.

Event	Year	Location	Date	Ref.
1st Aerobic Gymnastics Asian Cup	2018	Ulaanbaatar, Mongolia	September 13–16, 2018	
1st Rhythmic Gymnastics Asian Cup	2018	Ulaanbaatar, Mongolia	October 25–28, 2018	
1st Junior Artistic Gymnastics Asian Cup	2019	Ulaanbaatar, Mongolia	June 12–15, 2019	

== See also ==
- Aerobic gymnastics at the Asian Indoor and Martial Arts Games
- Gymnastics at the Asian Games
